= Rafael Barišić =

Roman Catholic bishop (1796–1863)

The Most Reverend Rafael Barišić O.F.M.
- Apostolic Vicar of Herzegovina Titular Bishop of Ashdod
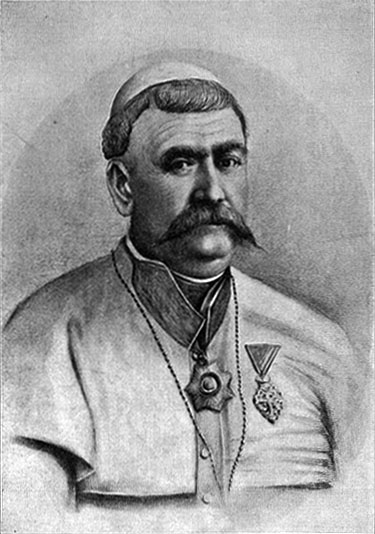
- Church: Catholic Church
- Diocese: Herzegovina
- Appointed: 24 September 1847
- Term ended: 14 August 1863
- Predecessor: Office established
- Successor: Anđeo Kraljević
- Other post: Apostolic Vicar of Bosnia (1832–47) Parson of Zovik (1830–32)

Orders
- Consecration: 30 September 1832

Personal details
- Born: 24 June 1796 Oćevija, Vareš, Bosnia, Ottoman Empire
- Died: 14 August 1863 (aged 67) Mostar, Bosnia, Ottoman Empire
- Denomination: Catholic

Rafael Barišić, O.F.M. (24 June 1796 – 14 August 1863) was a Bosnian-Herzegovinian Croat prelate of the Catholic Church who served as the apostolic vicar of Herzegovina from 1847 to his death in 1863 and apostolic vicar of Bosnia from 1832 to 1847.

== Early life ==
Barišić was born in Oćevija, a small village near Vareš, at the time part of Bosnia Eyalet of the Ottoman Empire. His father was named Marijan, and his mother was Mara née Pejčinović. His cousin Gabrijel Barešić was also a Franciscan who served as the bishop of Lezhë (in present-day Albania) in Rumelia Eyalet. On 16 April 1817, Barišić entered a novitiate at the Franciscan friary in Kraljeva Sutjeska. A year later, he gave his vows. At the time, the Franciscan Province of Bosnia sent its friars for education in Italy or Hungary, since there were no established institutions for the education of clergy in Bosnia at the time. Thus, Barišić was sent for education in Turin, where he successfully finished his studies. In Turin, he held a public discussion on philosophy, which served as a condition for licentiate for the professorship and the so-called rigorous exams. His thesis was titled in Latin as Conclusiones selectae ex universa philosophia. In 1823, he held a public discussion on theology titled Theses ex Theologia selectae. After successfully defending both his theses and finishing the rigorous exams, he gained the title of general lector. He lectured on philosophy in Turin, and theology in Bologna. Because of the lack of priests in Bosnia, the Province requested Barišić to return in 1827, and there he was appointed the Province's secretary and director of education. In 1830, Barišić was appointed a parson in Zovik in northern Bosnia.

== Apostolic Vicar of Bosnia ==
On 27 March 1832, Barišić was appointed Apostolic Vicar of Bosnia and the titular bishop of Ashdod (in present-day Israel). He was consecrated on 30 September 1832 in Đakovo in Austrian Empire. Immediately after his consecration, Barišić travelled to the capital, Vienna, to gain permission from Ferdinand I of Austria for the establishment of a seminary for the education of the Bosnian Franciscans, which the Franciscan Province of Bosnia would govern. At the same time, he asked the emperor to help the Catholics in Bosnia and Herzegovina, especially with gaining a ferman from the sultan for the improvement of the lives of Catholics and to prevent qadis (the Muslim judges) from officiating Catholic weddings. Barišić returned to Bosnia in December 1832, and was officially installed as apostolic vicar on 5 December 1832 in Kraljeva Sutjeska.

Barišić believed that he, as a bishop, had the exclusive right to establish parishes and appoint parish priests. He tried to establish the church hierarchy in Bosnia, which the Bosnian Franciscans opposed, seeing that as a threat to their privileges. The issue became known as the Barišić Affair, and it split the Bosnian Franciscans into those who supported the new bishop and those who opposed him. Barišić was endorsed by the Franciscans educated in Italy, while those educated in Austria opposed him. The Barišić Affair became internationalised, gaining interest from the Pope, the Austrian Emperor, the Ottoman Sultan, and the Ottoman regional government in Travnik. The dispute reached its peak during the tenure of the two Bosnian Provincials – Andrija Kujundžić and Stipe Marijanović. During the visitation of Friar Šimun Milanović, the dispute was somewhat mitigated, and the agreement between the bishop and the Bosnian Franciscans was signed on 9 October 1839. Barišić publicly pronounced it on 13 January 1840.

On 1 May 1838, Barišić wrote to Ferdinand about the hardships of Catholics in Bosnia and Herzegovina. In 1840, Barišić sent his emissary to Ferdinand, so the Viennese diplomacy could gain another ferman from the sultan that would approve free activity of the bishop in Bosnia, to prevent qadis from officiating Catholic weddings, and to get the protection of Catholics from the Austrian Empire. In December 1840, Abdulmejid I granted him the ferman, fulfilling all his requests. Encouraged by the ferman, Barišić intended to construct the episcopal residence, a chapel, and a seminary near Travnik. However, the dispute with the Bosnian Franciscans resurged once again, and Barišić was recalled to Rome.

While in Rome, Barišić published a prayer book titled Paša duhovna (the Spiritual Pasture). In 1842, he was sent to the Diocese of Bar in Albania to resolve a dispute between the faithful and the clergy, and between the clergy themselves. His mission was successful and he was thus sometimes called "the angel of peace."

== Apostolic Vicar of Herzegovina ==
Herzegovinian Franciscans, mostly from the friary in Kreševo, who took pastoral care over Herzegovina, decided to establish their friary in Herzegovina in Široki Brijeg in 1840. Leaders of this initiative were Nikola Kordić, Anđeo Kraljević and Ilija Vidošević. At the time, Barišić had an uneasy relationship with the Bosnian Franciscans. The Herzegovinian Franciscans established contact with Vizier Ali Pasha Rizvanbegović, who was granted his own Herzegovina Eyalet by the Ottoman sultan for his loyalty during the Bosnian uprising. The Franciscans considered that they would build their friary faster if Barišić came to Herzegovina.

The parson of Čerigaj friar Ilija Vidošević wrote to Barišić about the idea of establishing a separate Herzegovinian apostolic vicariate, an idea also supported by Ali Pasha. In 1843, Barišić returned from a trip in Albania and stayed in Čerigaj, where Vidošević helped him to establish a connection with Ali Pasha. In 1844, the Church authorities allowed the Franciscans to build a friary in Široki Brijeg, so the Herzegovinian Franciscans left their former friaries to create a new one. In 1845, Barišić wrote to the Propaganda to allow him to move to Herzegovina, stating that from there, he would also serve the Diocese of Trebinje-Mrkan and that Catholics and Muslims there "all love him and want him, including the Vizier".

The main argument of the Herzegovinian Franciscans for establishing a special vicariate was the number of parishes and the faithful Catholics in Herzegovina. According to a report from Bishop Augustin Miletić from 1818–19, Herzegovina had eight parishes and 3,100 Catholic families, with 20,223 Catholics. Ten years later, the same bishop reported that there were 51,744 Catholics, a third of the total number of Catholics in Bosnia and Herzegovina.

On 29 October 1845, Barišić informed the Propaganda that he would renounce his office as the apostolic vicar of Bosnia. Rome and Istanbul entered the negotiations about the seat of Barišić, and both were compliant about his transfer to Herzegovina. The Church's negotiator was Anthony Petros IX Hassun. The secretary of the Propaganda wrote to Barišić on 13 March 1846, informing him about the success in the negotiations and calling him to resign from the office of the Apostolic Vicar of Bosnia "as soon as possible", which he did.

On 29 April 1846, the Propaganda informed Barišić that he should move to Herzegovina immediately after he receives a ferman of approval from the Sultan. The next day the Rome established an independent vicariate for Herzegovina, and named Barišić the apostolic vicar. Around that time, Barišić, at the time in Istanbul, received the ferman and two letters of approval from Ali Pasha. Barišić was granted several privileges, including the guarantee of freedom of religion. He informed the Propaganda about the approval on 26 May 1846. He left Istanbul for Trieste two days later and arrived in Herzegovina on 18 June 1846. The episcopal residence was being built in Vukodol near Mostar, while Barišić resided in Seonica near Županjac (Duvno, present-day Tomislavgrad), where he established his curia. Seonica served as his seat from 18 June 1846 until 2 June 1851. As the existing land parcel in Vukodol was too small for a residence, Ali Pasha bought privately owned land from a local Muslim and granted it to the vicariate, with strong opposition from the Muslim locals. Ali Pasha also protected the construction. The construction was completed at the beginning of 1851, and Barišić moved there on 2 June 1851. After Barišić moved to Mostar, the religious life of the local Catholics flourished. The Catholics from the neighbouring hills around Mostar returned to the city and became involved in the public, cultural, and political life of the city.

In June 1861, Barišić became seriously ill. His health deteriorated in 1862, so he moved from Mostar to the Franciscan monastery in Široki Brijeg. Nevertheless, made efforts to build a cathedral church. On 27 May 1862, with the help of Omar Pasha, Barišić was granted land in the centre of Mostar, previously a garden owned by Ali Pasha. The Governor of Mostar reluctantly gave Barišić the approval to build the church on 13 March 1863. However, Barišić never managed to lay the new church's cornerstone, as he died soon afterwards on 14 August 1863.
