= Božidar Bralo =

Croatian fascist official

Poglavnik's deputy for Sarajevo
- In office 20 April 1941 – 7 August 1941
- Preceded by: Office established
- Succeeded by: Office abolished

Personal details
- Born: 28 December 1907 Brina, Livno, Condominium of Bosnia and Herzegovina, Austria-Hungary
- Died: 6 November 1945 (aged 37) Sarajevo, PR Bosnia and Herzegovina, FPR Yugoslavia
- Party: Ustaše
- Education: Archdiocesan Theological Seminary, Zagreb
- Profession: Catholic priest

Božidar Bralo (28 December 1907 – 6 November 1945) was a Croatian Catholic priest who served as the Ustaše commissioner for Sarajevo from April to August 1941, in the World War II Axis puppet state known as the Independent State of Croatia (NDH).

A member of the Franciscan Order and a prominent face in interwar Sarajevo's Catholic life, Bralo was appointed as the first vicar of Saint Joseph's Church by Archbishop Ivan Šarić in 1939. He was noted for his anti-Serb views and his opposition to the Kingdom of Yugoslavia, which he viewed as an extension of Serbia and an obstacle to Croatian national aspirations. Following the Axis invasion and occupation of Yugoslavia in April 1941, Bralo joined a delegation welcoming the Wehrmacht into Sarajevo and was later named as one of two deputies overseeing the city's political transition on behalf of NDH leader Ante Pavelić. His immediate superior was the Ustaše commissioner for Bosnia and Herzegovina, Jure Francetić.

During his tenure, Bralo established a pervasive cult of personality, and was reviled by Sarajevo's political elite for interfering in municipal matters and harassing local officials. He implemented a number of anti-Serb and anti-Semitic measures, overseeing the processing and redistribution of confiscated Jewish property and the killing of 180 Serbs at Alipašin Most, in modern-day Novi Grad. Increasingly unpopular, he was dismissed from his post in August 1941, but was made a deputy in the Croatian Parliament the following year. As the Yugoslav Partisans surrounded Sarajevo in April 1945, Bralo raised an ad hoc force of 145 insurgents to resist them, which managed to hold out for several months before most of its members were captured. Bralo was put on trial by the communists in the fall of 1945. In September, he was sentenced to death by firing squad, and executed two months later. The historian Emily Greble has described him as "one of the most infamous Catholic figures from wartime Sarajevo".

== Early life ==
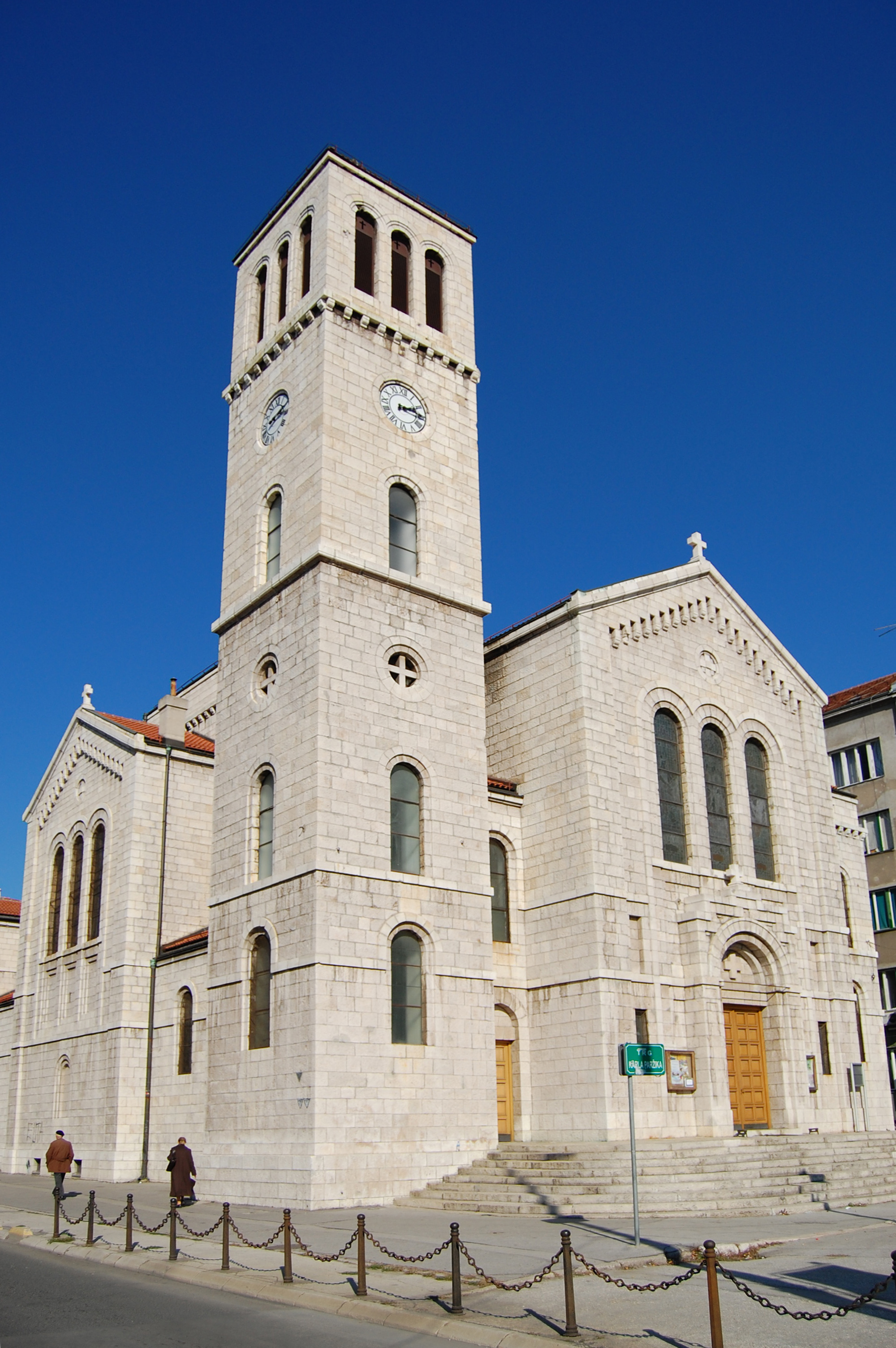
St. Joseph's Church in Sarajevo

Božidar Bralo was born in the village of Brina, near Livno, on 28 December 1907, to parents Mihovil and Mara Bralo (née Čondrić). A graduate of the Archdiocesan Theological Seminary in Zagreb, he later became a member of the Franciscan Order. As a close associate of the Archbishop of Sarajevo, Ivan Šarić, Bralo was a prominent fixture within Sarajevo's Catholic community during the interwar period, serving as the editor of the publication Katolički svijet ("Catholic World") and the president of the Trebević choral society. He was known for his youth work and his promotion of Catholic religious life, advocating for Sunday school to be made mandatory for all Catholic schoolchildren from the first to the eighth grade. In 1939, Šarić appointed Bralo as the first vicar of Saint Joseph's Church, which both men hoped to one day turn into Sarajevo's second Catholic cathedral.

== World War II ==
=== Prelude ===
Although Sarajevo's Muslim and Croat political elites entered into an uneasy alliance following the Cvetković–Maček Agreement of 1939, many Muslims feared Bralo's Croatian nationalism. According to the historian Emily Greble, Bralo "passionately despised" the Kingdom of Yugoslavia, which he viewed as a thinly veiled Greater Serbia, as well as the Yugoslav national idea itself on the grounds that it suppressed Croatian national aspirations. She further describes him as "one of the most radical Croat nationalists and Ustasha supporters in the city". His vehemently anti-Serb pronouncements were well known to the rest of the Catholic clergy, many of whom fostered Croatian nationalist views themselves. Bralo believed that fascism would save the Bosnian Croats from secularization, liberal immorality and Serbianization, and considered Catholicism inseparable from Croatian ethnic identity. Prior to the Axis invasion of Yugoslavia in April 1941, he participated in secret meetings with other Axis sympathizers.

=== Establishment of the NDH ===
On 15 April, German troops entered Sarajevo. Two days later, Bralo was among five city delegates—three Catholic and two Muslim—who welcomed the Wehrmacht into the city. The German commander told them that Yugoslavia had been routed and that Sarajevo would come under the administration of the newly established Axis puppet state known as the Independent State of Croatia (Croatian: Nezavisna država Hrvatska; NDH), which was to be ruled by the Ustaše movement. He gave the delegates permission to travel to Zagreb to meet with representatives of this puppet government, providing them with vehicles, firearms and travel documents. Upon arriving in Zagreb, they met with Ustaše official Mile Budak and gave him a letter describing how Sarajevo's Muslim and Catholic elites had been "caught unprepared" by the NDH's creation and felt "disoriented" by the events of the previous few weeks. They also complained that the city's handful of self-proclaimed Ustaše representatives were more interested in looting and vandalism than overseeing a political transition.

=== Tenure as Poglavnik's deputy ===
NDH leader (Poglavnik) Ante Pavelić soon appointed Bralo as one of two deputies (Croatian: poglavnikovi povjerenici) to oversee the transition in Sarajevo, the other being Hakija Hadžić, a prominent Bosnian Muslim professor. They were directly subordinated to the Ustaše commissioner for Bosnia and Herzegovina, Jure Francetić. According to Greble, although both Bralo and Hadžić "considered themselves supreme authorities in Sarajevo, they essentially served as middlemen and mouthpieces for Zagreb." They announced national laws, delivered public speeches, appointed commissioners to oversee institutions and businesses, and disseminated propaganda, foremost through the new newspaper Sarajevski Novi List ("Sarajevo's New Daily"). The first two weeks of Ustaše rule in Sarajevo were marked by a profound sense of confusion and political uncertainty, and many of those appointed by Pavelić lacked the knowledge and skills needed to run a government bureaucracy.

On 7 May, Bralo and Hadžić authorized exemptions for "our local Serbs", a loosely defined category applied to Sarajevans of Orthodox background who posed "no discernable threat to the goals of the NDH." These included lower-level bureaucrats, women, children, and the elderly. Some Sarajevan Serbs applied for this exemption on the grounds that their families had resided in the city before 1918. Others sent detailed genealogical records to the mayor's office to prove they were "one hundred percent Aryan Serb". Nevertheless, Bralo and the other Ustaše unilaterally excluded certain Serbs from being considered "local", among them those who arrived in the interwar period, as well as Serbian Orthodox priests and their families. Some of these were later summarily executed. During his tenure, Bralo was reported to have overseen the massacre of 180 Serbs at Alipašin Most, in what is now the district of Novi Grad. According to the historian Frederick Bernard Singleton, he is then said to have "danced a macabre dance round their bodies in his soutane, with the Ustaše militiamen."

By late May, local civic leaders came to view Bralo and Hadžić as "completely useless". Bralo repeatedly asked Pavelić to be transferred to another city, complaining that his position "lacked substance and authority". Bralo and Hadžić attempted to compensate for their lack of real authority by interfering in municipal matters and harassing local officials, Catholics and Muslims alike. For example, when local Croatian Peasant Party members declined to join the Ustaše, Bralo and Hadžić either jailed them or banned them from participating in public life, a move which alienated many of the city's Croats. Concurrently, Bralo and Hadžić both attempted to foster their own cults of personality, arranging for local newspapers to print articles glorifying them and their role in state matters. Despite repeated complaints from city officials, who spoke of cronyism and bad governance, Pavelić was initially hesitant to transfer Bralo and Hadžić elsewhere.

In June 1941, Bralo and Hadžić were appointed as trustees to administer the plundered assets of Sarajevo's Sephardic and Ashkenazi communities. Bralo later became one of the main driving forces behind the deportation of Sarajevo's Jews. Although it used anti-Semitic language, the Catholic Church in Sarajevo rejected the existence of a Jewish race, believing that Jews who converted to Catholicism should be saved. Bralo personally oversaw the conversion of more than 1,000 Sarajevan Jews to Catholicism. However, this earned him the enmity of some Bosnian Muslim autonomists, who on 1 November 1942 authored a memorandum to Adolf Hitler complaining about Bralo's actions. (Note: Calling themselves the People's Committee, the authors of the memorandum denounced Bralo for allowing Jews to convert to Catholicism to escape persecution: "He thwarted your intentions and order regarding the Jews, beginning immediately to accept many Jews in Bosnia into the Catholic Church, particularly in Sarajevo, where they are very numerous and very rich. In that way he attempted to protect them from what, after the victory and occupation of this country, had to happen." The authors further accused Jews of financing the Partisans and Chetniks, and claimed that Bralo had overseen the conversion of 3,800 Jews. "Although this number appears to be an exaggeration," Greble writes, "...it is indicative of a citywide trend that the church made no attempt to deny.") Although conversion alone was not enough to spare Jews from being deported, it usually bought them time to flee to the Italian zone or join resistance groups in the surrounding mountains. Yet, on other occasions, Bralo cynically used the prospect of conversion as a means of assuring Jews of their safety before they were killed. When a group of Jews inquired about members of their family who had agreed to undergo conversion, Bralo replied: "Do not worry about them, I saved their soul," before adding, "I did not guarantee that they would be left alive." Bralo's tenure as Poglavnik's deputy ended on 7 August 1941. Afterwards, the position Bralo and Hadžić had once occupied was abolished.

=== Capture and death ===
In 1942, Bralo was named as a deputy in the Croatian Parliament (Sabor). As the Yugoslav Partisans surrounded Sarajevo in April 1945, he refused to evacuate from the city and assembled a small "Catholic reactionary force", as Greble describes it, consisting of about 145 armed men who hid in the mountains and fought the Partisans for several months before most of them were captured. Bralo himself was among those captured and was put on trial by Yugoslavia's new communist government in the fall of 1945. On 5 September 1945, he was sentenced to death by firing squad, which led to his being defrocked by the Archdiocese of Vrhbosna. His execution took place in Sarajevo's military prison at 5:00 a.m. on the morning of 6 November 1945. What little was left of the insurgents he mustered remained active around the city for the next several years. Greble has described Bralo as "one of the most infamous Catholic figures from wartime Sarajevo".
