= Zovik =

Zovik may refer to:

- Zovik, Bosnia and Herzegovina
- Zovik, Iran
