= Slabinja (disambiguation) =

Slabinja is a toponym used for two villages divided by the state border at the Una river:

- Donja and Gornja Slabinja, on the right bank, in Bosnia and Herzegovina
- Slabinja, on the left bank, in Croatia
