= Anna Grzymala =

American political scientist

Anna Maria Grzymala-Busse is an American political scientist. She is the Michelle and Kevin Douglas Professor of International Studies in the department of political science at Stanford University. She is also a senior fellow at Freeman Spogli Institute for International Studies and director of The Europe Center at Stanford University. Grzymala-Busse is known for her research on state development and transformation, religion and politics, political parties, informal political institutions, and post-communist politics. Previously, she was the Ronald Eileen Weiser Professor at University of Michigan.

Grzymala-Busse received a doctorate in government from Harvard University in 2000. Grzymala attended Princeton University (AB, Public and International Affairs, 1992) and Cambridge University (M.Phil., 1993).

In 2017, she was elected to the American Academy of Arts and Sciences.

== Books ==
- Sacred Foundations: The Religious and Medieval Roots of the European State. Princeton University Press. Princeton 2023.
- Nations under God. How Churches Use Moral Authority to Influence Policy. Princeton University Press. Princeton 2015.
- Rebuilding Leviathan. Party Competition and State Exploitation in Post-Communist Democracies. Cambridge University Press, Cambridge 2007.
- Redeeming the Communist Past. The Regeneration of the Communist Successor Parties in East Central Europe. Cambridge University Press, Cambridge 2002.

== Awards ==
- 2020 Guggenheim Fellowship, Field: Political Science
- 2017 Laura Shannon Prize in Contemporary European Studies, Nanovic Institute, Nations under God
- 2017 Luebbert Best Book Award, Comparative Politics Section APSA, Nations under God
- 2016 Andrew Carnegie Fellow
- 2016 Giovanni Sartori Book Award, Honorable Mention, APSA, Nations under God
- 2016 Best Book Award, European Politics and Society Section APSA, Nations under God
- 2012 Alexander George Award for Best Article, Qualitative Methods Section APSA
- 2008 Ed A. Hewett Prize for Best Publication on the Political Economy of the Former Soviet Union and East Central Europe
- 2000 Gabriel Amond Award for Best Dissertation in Comparative Politics; American Political Science Association (APSA)
