= Franciscan Friary and the Church of Saint Anthony of Padua, Sarajevo =

Franciscan church and friary in Sarajevo, Bosnia and Herzegovina

Franciscan Friary and Church of Saint Anthony of Padua
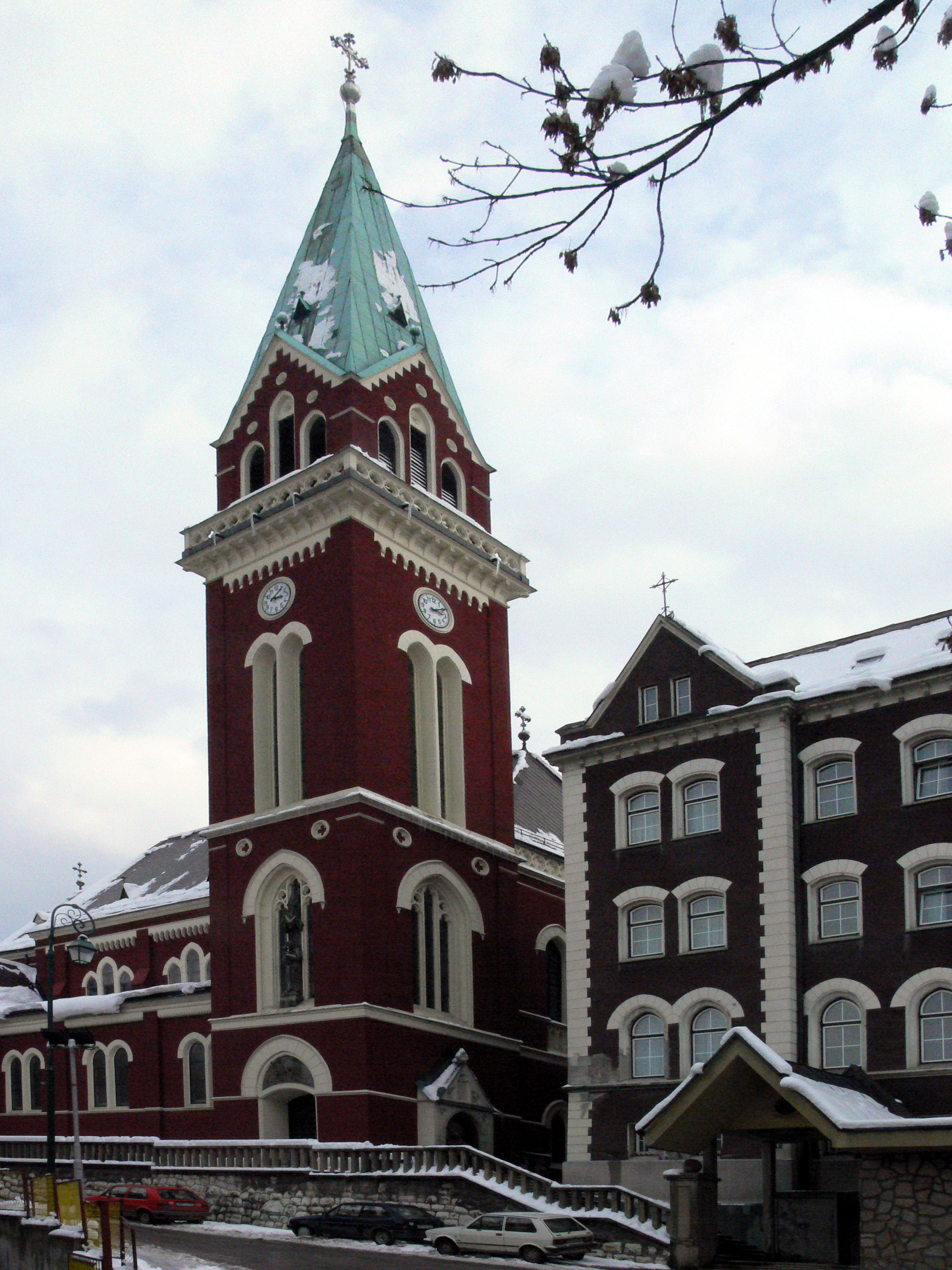
- The church and the adjacent monastery in 2006

- Franciscan Friary and Church of Saint Anthony of Padua
- 43°51′21″N 18°25′53″E
- Location: Sarajevo
- Country: Bosnia and Herzegovina
- Denomination: Roman Catholic
- Website: http://svantosarajevo.org/

History
- Dedication: Anthony of Padua
- Consecrated: 20 September 1914

Architecture
- Functional status: Active
- Heritage designation

KONS of Bosnia and Herzegovina
- Official name: Franciscan monastery and church of St. Anthony in Sarajevo together with its movable property, the architectural ensemble
- Type: Category I cultural property
- Designated: 8 November 2006 (Sarajevo, - th session; decision No.06.1-2-191/06-8)
- Reference no.: 2898
- Criteria for friary: A, B, C i.ii.iii.iv.v.vi., D i.ii.iii.iv.v., E i.ii.iii.iv.v., F i.ii.iii., G i.ii.iii.iv.v.vi.vii., H i.iii., I i.ii.iii.iv.
- Criteria for church: A, B, E i.ii.iii.iv.v., F i.ii.iii., G iii.iv.vi.vii., I i.ii.
- Architect(s): Josip Vancaš; Carlo Panek
- Style: Gothic Revival
- Groundbreaking: 1912
- Completed: 1913

Administration
- Archdiocese: Archdiocese of Vrhbosna
- Archdeaconry: Archdeaconry of Fojnica
- Deanery: Deanery of Sarajevo

Clergy
- Archbishop: Vinko Puljić
- Dean: Msgr. Ante Meštrović
- Priest: Ivan Šarčević O.F.M.

The Franciscan Friary and the Church of Saint Anthony of Padua (Serbo-Croatian: Franjevački samostan i crkva Svetog Ante Padovanskog/Црква светог Анте Падованског), an architectural ensemble consisting of the Franciscan friary of Saint Anthony on Bistrik and the Church of Saint Anthony of Padua, is a Roman Catholic place of worship and one of the houses of Franjevačka provincija Bosna Srebrena (transl. Franciscan Province of Bosnia Argentina). It is dedicated to the Franciscan friar Anthony of Padua. The complex of buildings is inscribed into the list of National Monuments of Bosnia and Herzegovina by the KONS. The friary and church are located in Sarajevo, in the Stari Grad municipality, Bosnia and Herzegovina.

== Location ==
The part of the Bistrik, large neighborhood in the Stari Grad municipality, which spread on the left bank of the Miljacka river on the slopes of Trebević mountain, where the Franciscan friary and the votive church of St. Anthony of Padua are located, used to be called Latinluk (transl. Latin quarter), implying a presence of the Roman Catholic faithful in that part of the Bistrik neighborhood. The Latinluk or Latin quarter had about 200 Catholic families in 1652.

== Historical background ==
The present Church of Saint Anthony of Padua was preceded by two places of worship dedicated to the same saint and built on the same site. The former was constructed in 1853 as the first Catholic church in Sarajevo since 1697, when the church dedicated to the Blessed Virgin Mary, in the same neighbourhood, burned down during the Sack of Sarajevo by Prince Eugene of Savoy. The newly built church received crosses, a canopy, an altar, a chalice and other eucharistic objects from the French empress Eugénie de Montijo in 1864. The church burned down in a great fire of Sarajevo in 1879. Another building was constructed in 1881, but it was small and humble, made almost entirely of wood and adobe. As the only Catholic church in the city, it was ceded by the Bosnian Franciscans to the first Archbishop of Vrhbosna Josip Štadler, who used it as his residence from 1881 until the consecration of the Sacred Heart Cathedral in 1889. The old church was returned to the Franciscan friars. It was not, however, built to endure for long. By 1905, it had deteriorated to the point where it had to be closed.

== Architecture and art ==
The Franciscans of Sarajevo built the friary next to the church of St. Antony in 1894 based on a design by architect, Carlo Panek in Neo-Gothic style. The church itself was designed by Josip Vancaš, in Gothic style.

The demolition of the old church took place in 1912. A new building, an example of Gothic Revival architecture, was designed by Josip Vancaš and erected in its place by the end of the same year. The tower took two more years, however, and the church was not consecrated until September 1914.

The adjacent friary, built in 1894, houses the main archive of the Franciscan Province of Bosna Srebrena, as well as a rich pinakothek with more than a hundred works of mostly contemporary fine art by the most famous Bosnia and Herzegovinian painters. The present interior of the church dates from the 1960s. Featuring works of the sculptors Frano Kršinić and Iva Despić-Simonović, and painters Gabrijel Jurkić, Đuro Seder, Ivan Meštrović Edo Murtić, Nada Pivac, and Oton Gliha, among others, the Church of Saint Anthony of Padua is one of artistically most important churches in Bosnia and Herzegovina.

The friary housed the Franciscan seminary from 1909 until 1968, with a short break between 1942 and 1947 when the seminary was located in Kovačići neighborhood. From 1896 to 1963, the provincialate of the Bosnian Franciscan province was also located here, as well as its novitiate from 1985 to 1992.

The church survived the shelling during the 1992–1995 Siege of Sarajevo remarkably unscathed, with significant damage being done only to the façade and the stained glass windows. The restoration was completed in the autumn of 2006.

Catholic students from the city of Sarajevo gather in the friary every Tuesday. Through joint prayer, lectures and socializing, they build and strengthen their Christian community.

== Civic and religious contribution to city ==
Both the Franciscan friary and the church of St. Antony affirmed its presence and leading role, especially during and after the Bosnian war and the Siege of Sarajevo of 1990's, both in civic and religious sense, as the center of the Franciscan presence in the city of Sarajevo, and a place of numerous spiritual initiatives, ecumenical and interfaith dialog, cooperation and reconciliation, as well as practical contribution in providing humanitarian aid during the war of the 90's.

== Present status ==
While the monastery church is not presently a parish church, it is significant as a shrine of Saint Anthony. Unique among the numerous churches in Sarajevo, the Church of Saint Anthony of Padua claims to be the "church of all Sarajevans", boasting regular Muslim and Eastern Orthodox attendees.

The complex of buildings, the Church of Saint Anthony of Padua and the adjacent Franciscan friary, is inscribed into the list of National Monuments of Bosnia and Herzegovina by the KONS, on 8 November 2006.

== Gallery ==
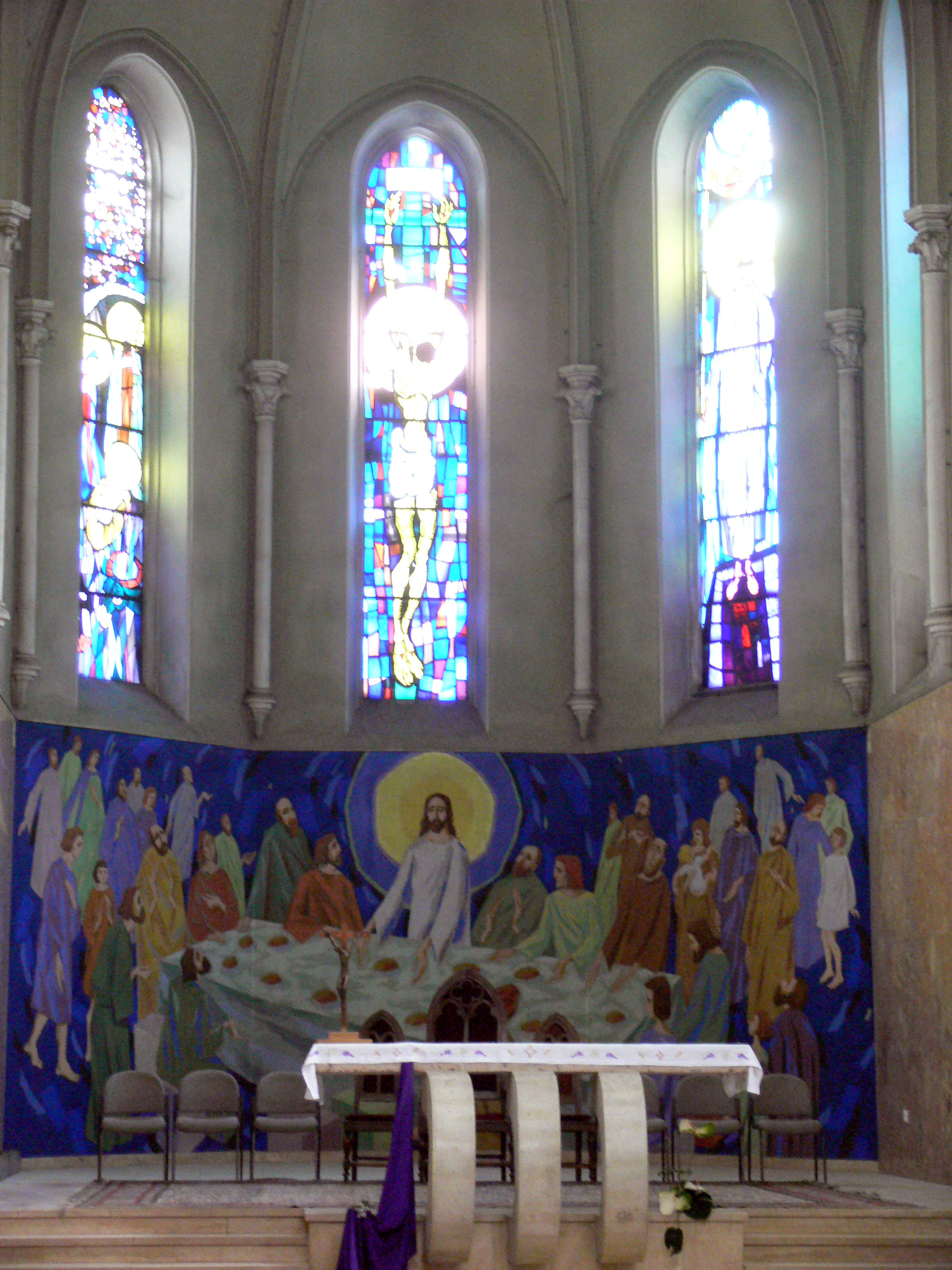
A depiction of the Last Supper

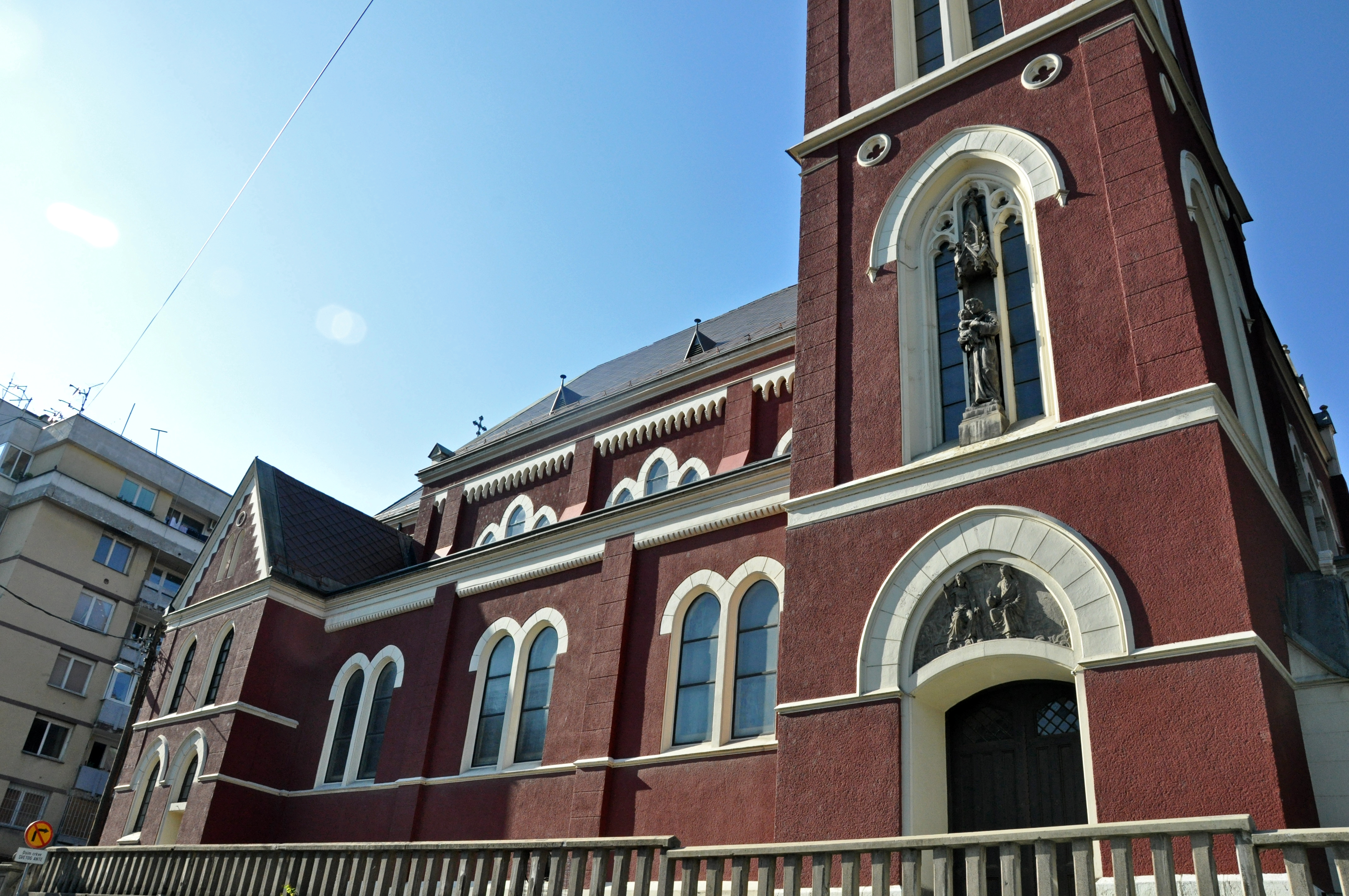
Front view of the exterior

== See also ==
- St. Joseph's Church, Sarajevo – another Gothic Revival-style church
