= Pobrđani, Kostajnica =

Pobrđani Побрђани
- Village
- Location within Bosnia and Herzegovina
- Coordinates: 45°7′59″N 16°34′54″E
- Country: Bosnia and Herzegovina
- Entity: Republika Srpska
- Municipality: Kostajnica

Area
  - Total: 1,007 km^{2} (389 sq mi)

Population
  - Total: 144
  - Density: 14/km^{2} (36/sq mi)
- Time zone: UTC+1 (CET)
  - Summer (DST): UTC+2 (CEST)

Pobrđani (Serbian: Побрђани) is a village in the municipality of Kostajnica, Republika Srpska, Bosnia and Herzegovina.
