= Kalenderi =

Kalenderi Календери
- Village
- Location within Bosnia and Herzegovina
- Coordinates: 45°10′00″N 16°34′22″E
- Country: Bosnia and Herzegovina
- Entity: Republika Srpska
- Municipality: Kostajnica

Area
  - Total: 727 km^{2} (281 sq mi)

Population (2013)
  - Total: 176
  - Density: 24/km^{2} (62/sq mi)
- Time zone: UTC+1 (CET)
  - Summer (DST): UTC+2 (CEST)

Kalenderi (Cyrillic: Календери) is a village in the municipality of Kostajnica, Republika Srpska, Bosnia and Herzegovina.
