= Tara Zahra =

American historian (born 1976)

- Born: August 3, 1976 (age 50)

Academic background
- Education: Swarthmore College; University of Michigan

Academic work
- Discipline: East European History
- Institutions: University of Chicago

Tara Elizabeth Zahra (born August 3, 1976) is an American academic who is the Hanna Holborn Gray Professor of East European History at the University of Chicago.

A graduate of Swarthmore College, Zahra received her PhD from the University of Michigan. She has concentrated her studies on sociohistorical models and archival research on family, nation, and ethnicity in the twentieth century leading to an integrative approach across national borders.

Zahra was awarded a MacArthur Fellowship in 2014. In 2017, she was elected to the American Academy of Arts and Sciences.

== Other awards ==
- 2009 Czechoslovak Studies Association Prize
- 2009 Barbara Jelavich Book Prize
- 2009 Hans Rosenberg Book Prize
- 2011 Laura Shannon Prize, Kidnapped Souls
- 2012 Radomír Luža Prize
- 2012 George Louis Beer Prize, The Lost Children

== Publications ==
- Zahra, Tara (2008). Kidnapped Souls: National Indifference and the Battle for Children in the Bohemian Lands, 1900-1948. Cornell University Press. ISBN 9780801446283. OCLC 164802970.
- Zahra, Tara (2011). The Lost Children: Reconstructing Europe's Families After World War II. Harvard University Press. ISBN 9780674048249. OCLC 676725391.
- Zahra, Tara (2016). Great Departure: Mass Migration from Eastern Europe and the Making of the Free World. W. W. Norton. ISBN 978-0393078015. OCLC 909974344.
- Zahra, Tara and Leora Auslander, eds. (2018), Objects of War: The Material Culture of Conflict and Displacement. Cornell University Press, 2018. ISBN 9781501720093.
- Zahra, Tara (2023). Against the World : Anti-Globalism and Mass Politics Between the World Wars. W. W. Norton. ISBN 978-0-393-65196-6. OCLC 1320809289.
