= Gumnjani =

Gumnjani Гумњани
- Village
- Location within Bosnia and Herzegovina
- Coordinates: 45°10′11″N 16°32′45″E
- Country: Bosnia and Herzegovina
- Entity: Republika Srpska
- Municipality: Kostajnica

Area
  - Total: 4.24 km^{2} (1.64 sq mi)

Population (2013)
  - Total: 51
  - Density: 12/km^{2} (31/sq mi)
- Time zone: UTC+1 (CET)
  - Summer (DST): UTC+2 (CEST)

Gumnjani (Cyrillic: Гумњани) is a village in the municipality of Kostajnica, Republika Srpska, Bosnia and Herzegovina.
