= Mraovo Polje =

Mraovo Polje Мраово Поље
- Village
- Location within Bosnia and Herzegovina
- Coordinates: 45°09′N 16°33′E
- Country: Bosnia and Herzegovina
- Entity: Republika Srpska
- Municipality: Kostajnica

Area
  - Total: 3.54 km^{2} (1.37 sq mi)

Population (2013)
  - Total: 49
  - Density: 14/km^{2} (36/sq mi)
- Time zone: UTC+1 (CET)
  - Summer (DST): UTC+2 (CEST)

Mraovo Polje (Cyrillic: Мраово Поље) is a village in the municipality of Kostajnica, Republika Srpska, Bosnia and Herzegovina.
