= Petrinja (Kostajnica) =

Petrinja Петриња
- Village
- Location within Bosnia and Herzegovina
- Coordinates: 45°12′54″N 16°37′02″E
- Country: Bosnia and Herzegovina
- Entity: Republika Srpska
- Municipality: Kostajnica

Area
  - Land: 11.58 km^{2} (4.47 sq mi)

Population (2013)
  - Total: 581
  - Density: 50/km^{2} (130/sq mi)
- Time zone: UTC+1 (CET)
  - Summer (DST): UTC+2 (CEST)

Petrinja (Cyrillic: Петриња) is a village in the municipality of Kostajnica, Republika Srpska, Bosnia and Herzegovina.

== Geography ==
The territory of the settlement of Petrinja, as well as the territory of the town of Kostajnica, extends into two geographic-pedological zones: the alluvial plain and the hilly area. The area of the alluvial plain along the Una river forms the so-called Petrinja plain (in Serbian Petrinjsko Polje), which represents the highest quality soil of this settlement. In the Petrinja field, agricultural varieties such as corn, wheat are grown.

== Settlement physiognomy ==
This settlement is a rural type settlement, which means that most of its inhabitants are engaged in some form of agricultural production. Due to the two types of land and geographical elements of the area, mixed agriculture is represented, namely by the animal husbandry and the crop farming. The settlement type is a compact settlement or a settlement with urban elements. The direction of the settlement is roughly east–west, and follow the direction of the main road Novi Grad - Kostajnica - Kozarska Dubica and the parallel local road, which runs through the settlement Petrinja. The distance to Kostajnica proper is 6.5 km. A typical form of housing in the settlement is a house with a yard. You can also see small houses of stones, bricks or wood.

== History ==
There are several archeological sites in the Kostajnica municipality, of which the remains of the medieval fort "Drenovac" in Petrinja can be found in the settlement of Petrinja. This means that the settlement of Petrinja has existed autonomously since the Middle Ages. The site itself is not clearly marked, and no significant effort has been made to protect this area.

== Education ==
On the territory of Petrinja there is an elementary school building, which operates within the central elementary school "Petar Mećava" in Kostajnica. The school educates pupils in the lower group of elementary education classes. The number of students ranges from 10 to 20 and teaching is conducted in the so-called combined classes.

== Culture ==
Next to the Primary School building in the village of Petrinja, there is a community center, which serves as the main gathering place for locals, as well as for the other citizens of Kostajnica municipality and beyond.
