= Jerrold Seigel =

American historian

Jerrold Seigel is an American historian who is professor emeritus at New York University. He taught for twenty-five years at Princeton University. His book Modernity and Bourgeois Life: Society, Politics and Culture in England, France, and Germany since 1750 (2012), won the 2014 Laura Shannon Prize for "the best book in European studies that transcends a focus on any one country, state, or people to stimulate new ways of thinking about contemporary Europe as a whole." He has been called "one of the greatest practitioners of intellectual history in our time" and sits on the editorial board of the Journal of the History of Ideas.

== Bibliography ==
- Marx's Fate: The Shape of a Life (Princeton University Press, 1978)
- Bohemian Paris: Culture, Politics, and the Boundaries of Bourgeois Life, 1830-1930 (Viking, 1986)
- The Private Worlds of Marcel Duchamp: Desire, Liberation, and the Self in Modern Culture (University of California Press, 1995)
- The Idea of the Self: Thought and Experience in Western Europe since the Seventeenth Century (Cambridge University Press, 2005).
- Modernity and Bourgeois Life: Society, Politics and Culture in England, France, and Germany since 1750 (Cambridge University Press, 2012)
- Between Cultures: Europe and Its Others in Five Exemplary Lives (Penn Press, 2015)
- Remaking the World: European Distinctiveness and the Transformation of Politics, Culture, and the Economy (Cambridge University Press, 2024)
