= Doris Bergen =

Canadian academic and Holocaust researcher

Doris Bergen FRSC
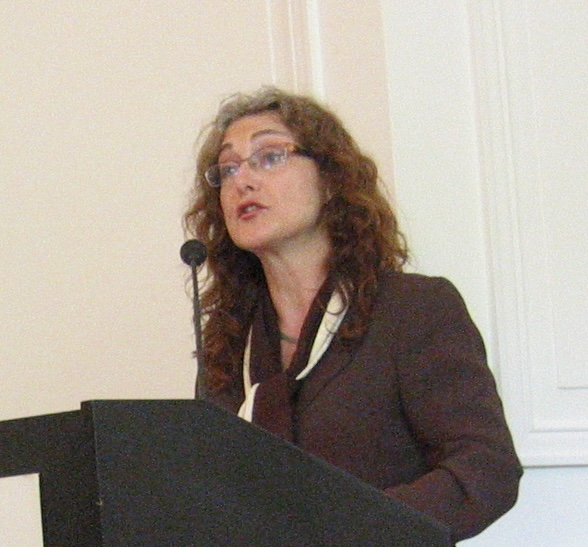
- Born: October 19, 1960 (age 66); Saskatoon, Saskatchewan, Canada

Academic background
- Education: B.A., 1982, University of Saskatchewan; M.A., Modern European History, 1984, University of Alberta; PhD., University of North Carolina at Chapel Hill
- Thesis: One Reich, one people, one church: the German Christian movement and the People's Church, 1932–1945 (1995)
- Academic advisor: Gerhard Weinberg

Academic work
- Discipline: History
- Sub-discipline: The Holocaust
- Institutions: University of Vermont; University of Notre Dame; University of Toronto
- Main interests: Religion, gender and ethnicity in the Holocaust

Doris Leanna Bergen (born October 19, 1960) FRSC is a Canadian academic and Holocaust historian. She is the Chancellor Rose and Ray Wolfe Professor of Holocaust Studies at the University of Toronto, the only endowed chair in Canada in Holocaust history. Bergen is also a member of the Academic Advisory Committee of the Center for Advanced Holocaust Studies at the United States Holocaust Memorial Museum. She was elected a Fellow of the Royal Society of Canada in 2018.

== Early life and education ==
Bergen is of German and Ukrainian descent and was raised a Mennonite in Saskatchewan. While her parents fled Ukraine in the early 1920s, Bergen had family in Europe who witnessed the Holocaust. After earning her Bachelor of Arts from the University of Saskatchewan, Bergen was educated at the University of Alberta and University of North Carolina at Chapel Hill. While writing her PhD dissertation in North Carolina, Bergen studied under the direction of Gerhard Weinberg, a professor with a focus on World War II.

== Career ==
Bergen began her academic career at the University of Vermont in 1991. While teaching there, Bergen was also a visiting instructor at the Universities of Warsaw, Tuzla, and Pristina. In 1996, Bergen was hired by the University of Notre Dame in their history department. She specialized in 20th century German history, with an emphasis on the Nazi era and the Holocaust, and European women's history. During this time, Bergen published Twisted cross: the German Christian movement in the Third Reich which focused on the Protestant Church's response to Nazism.

A year later, in 1997, Bergen held a Fellowship for Archival Research at the United States Holocaust Memorial Museum. In 1999, Bergen was a fellow at the Institute on the Holocaust and Jewish Civilization at Northwestern University. Bergen would later note that her interest in Holocaust studies grew from her personal connection to Mennonite communities. While keeping a strong focus on the stories of Jews during the Holocaust, Bergen was also interested in the oft-forgotten Holocaust victim groups such as the disabled, the Roma, Soviet prisoners of war, and Polish civilians. After returning to Notre Dame, Bergen published War and Genocide: A Concise History of the Holocaust in 2003. This book analyzed the varying experiences of violence of different groups of perpetrators, victims, and other participants during the Holocaust. She later edited a book on military chaplains, published by University of Notre Dame Press. In 2006, before taking a leave of absence, Bergen was elected Chair of the University Committee on Women Faculty and Students. In 2007, Bergen was named a full professor at the University of Toronto. She also replaced Michael Marrus as the Chancellor Rose and Ray Wolfe Professor of Holocaust Studies at the University of Toronto. This is the only endowed chair in Canada in Holocaust history. The following year, she was awarded the Graduate History Society Distinguished Service Award. After the 2009–10 academic year, Bergen was elected a senior fellow at Massey College, Toronto.

In 2012, Bergen was awarded U of T's Ludwik and Estelle Jus Memorial Human Rights Prize and named a member of the Academic Advisory Committee of the Center for Advanced Holocaust Studies at the United States Holocaust Memorial Museum. While assuming this role, she was also selected by Jason Kenney as an Advisory Council Members for the International Task Force on Holocaust Education, Remembrance and Research. Two years later, in 2014, Bergen was named to the National Holocaust Monument design team. This monument in Ottawa was recognized with the 2018 American Institute of Architects New York Design Award.

In 2015, Bergen was selected as a final juror for the Laura Shannon Prize. Two years later, Bergen collaborated with photographer Edward Burtynsky to produce Chai, a book featuring images from various Holocaust sites in Germany, Austria, the Czech Republic, Poland, Lithuania, and Hungary. Following this, Bergen was one of eleven U of T professors elected to the Royal Society of Canada and sat on U of T's 2018–19 Policy Committee. She also serves on the Editorial Advisory Board for the University of Toronto Press' Genocide Studies International.

== Selected publications ==
- Women, Gender, and the Church Struggle: The German Christian Movement's Quest for a Manly Church (1992).
- Twisted Cross: The German Christian Movement in the Third Reich (University of North Carolina Press, 1996).
- War and Genocide: A Concise History of the Holocaust (Rowman & Littlefield Publishers, 2002).
- The Sword of the Lord: Military Chaplains from the First to the Twenty-First Centuries (University of Notre Dame Press, 2004).
- (ed.), From Generation to Generation (Lessons and Legacies v. 8) (Northwestern University Press, 2008).
- The Holocaust: A New History (History Press Ltd, 2009).
- Alltag im Holocaust: Jüdisches Leben im Großdeutschen Reich 1941–1945 (Oldenbourg Wissenschaftsverlag: 2013).
- Between God and Hitler: Military Chaplains in Nazi Germany (Cambridge University Press, 2023).
