= Gorica Monastery =

Franciscan monastery in Bosnia and Herzegovina

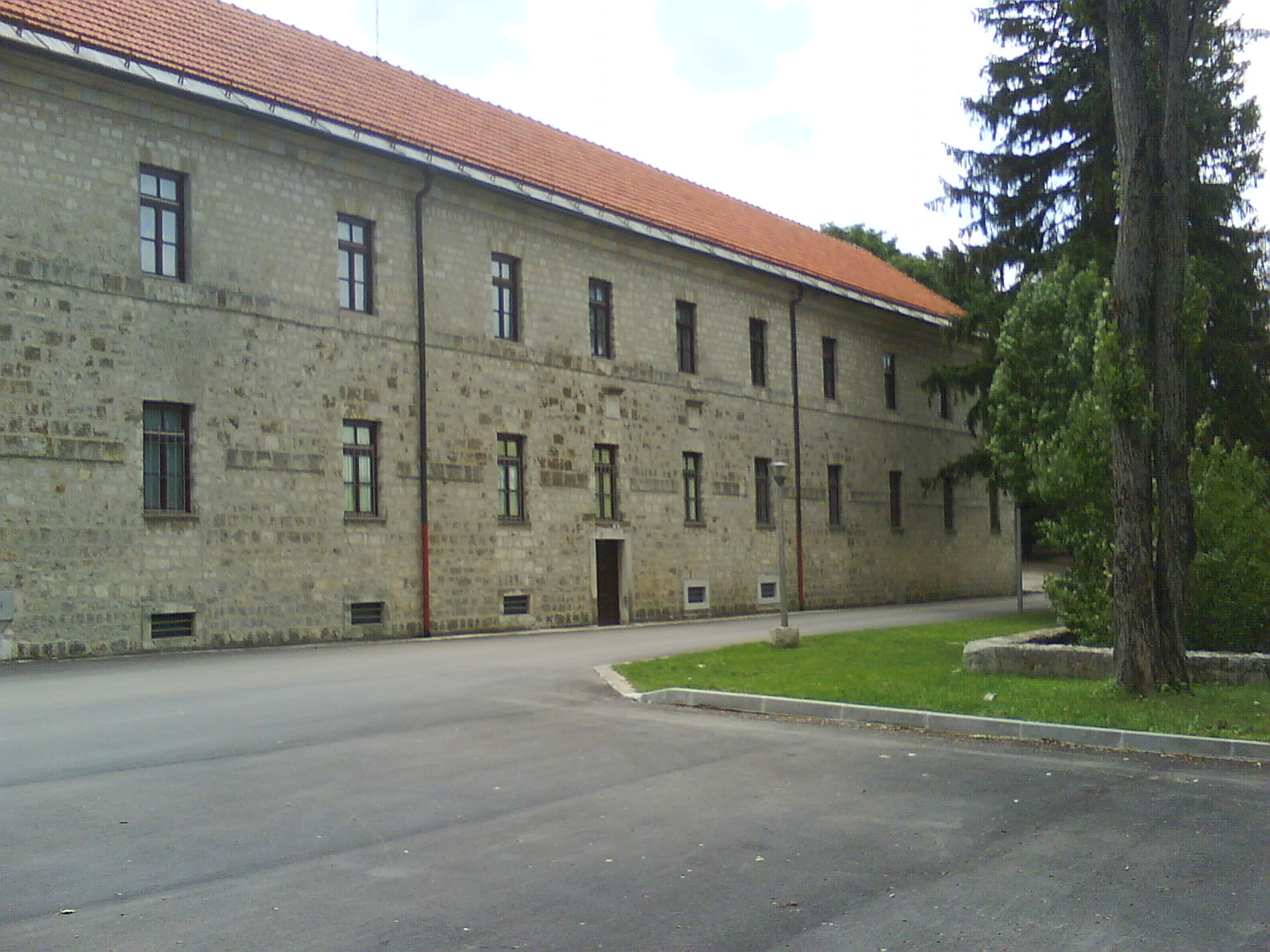

- Location within Bosnia and Herzegovina
- Interactive map of Gorica Monastery

Monastery information
- Other name: Samostan Gorica
- Order: Franciscan
- Established: 1859
- Diocese: Diocese of Banja Luka
- Controlled churches: Saints Peter and Paul Church

People
- Abbot: Miroslav Ištuk O.F.M.

Site
- Coordinates: 43.81906°N 17.01562°E

Gorica Monastery (Croatian: Samostan Gorica) is a Franciscan monastery in Gorica near Livno, Bosnia and Herzegovina.
