= Podoška =

Podoška Подошка
- Village
- Location within Bosnia and Herzegovina
- Coordinates: 45°10′N 16°37′E
- Country: Bosnia and Herzegovina
- Entity: Republika Srpska
- Municipality: Kostajnica

Area
  - Total: 373 km^{2} (144 sq mi)

Population (2013)
  - Total: 95
  - Density: 25/km^{2} (65/sq mi)
- Time zone: UTC+1 (CET)
  - Summer (DST): UTC+2 (CEST)

Podoška (Cyrillic: Подошка) is a village in the municipality of Kostajnica, Republika Srpska, Bosnia and Herzegovina
