= Kostajnica, Bosnia and Herzegovina =

Kostajnica Костајница
- Town and municipality
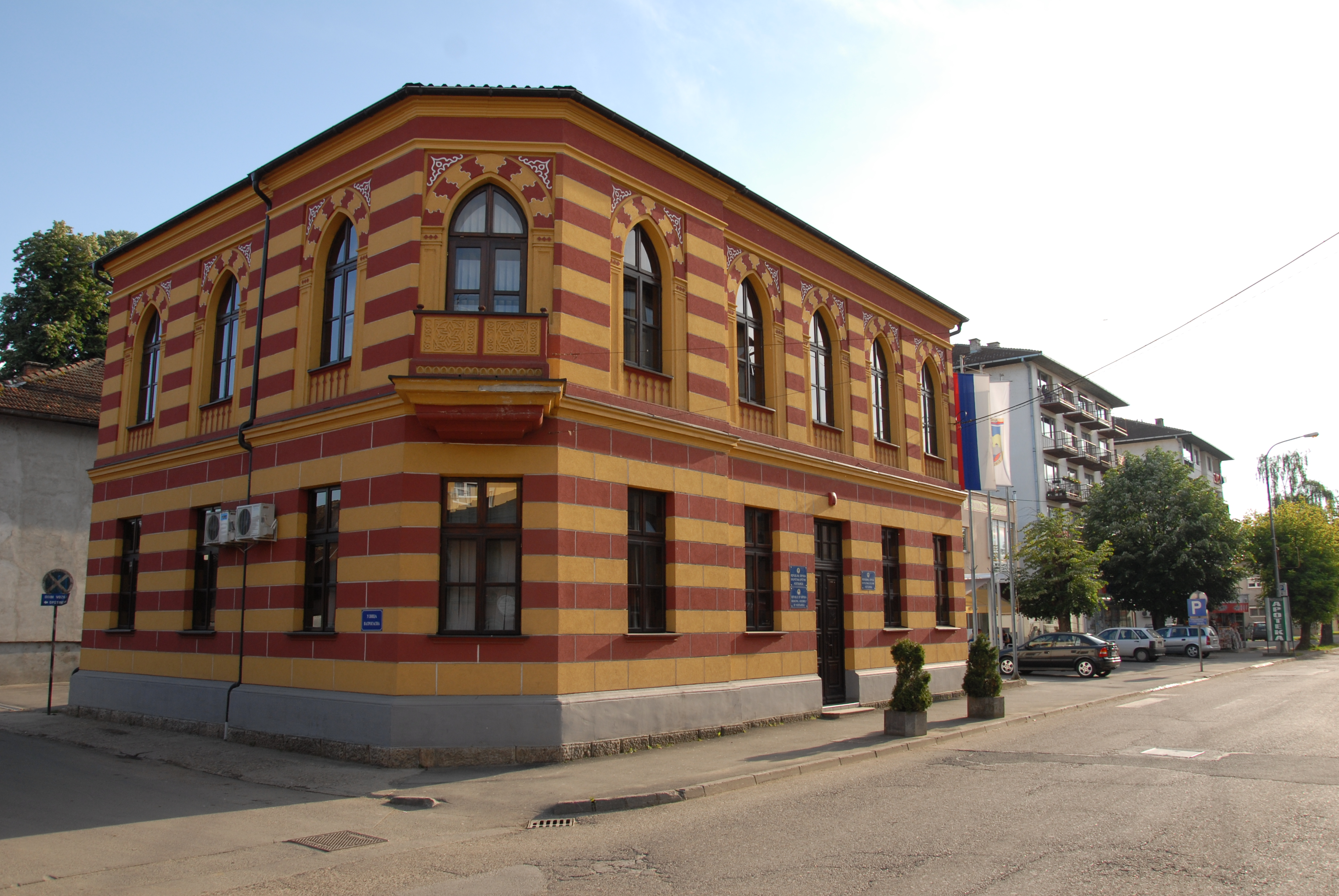
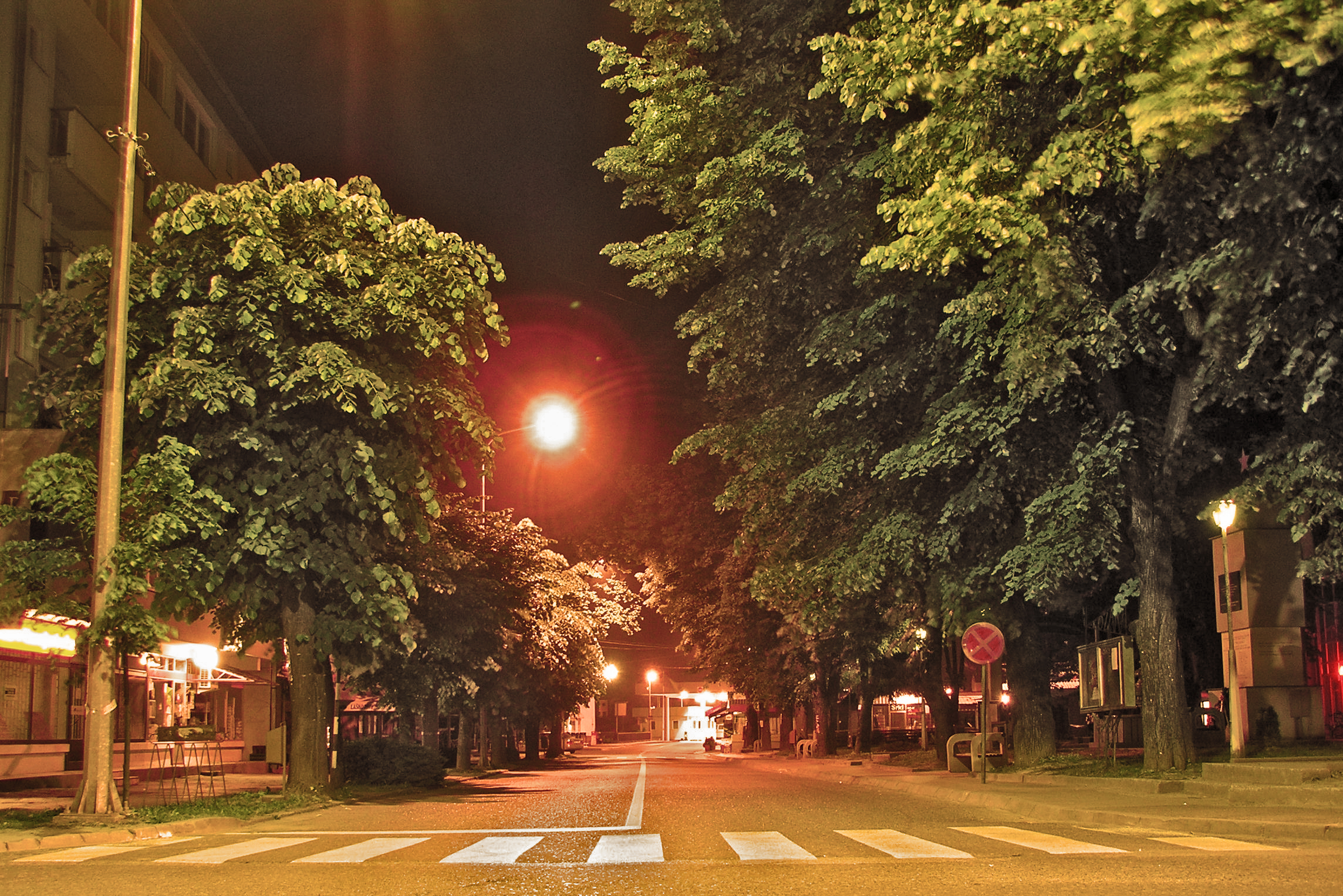
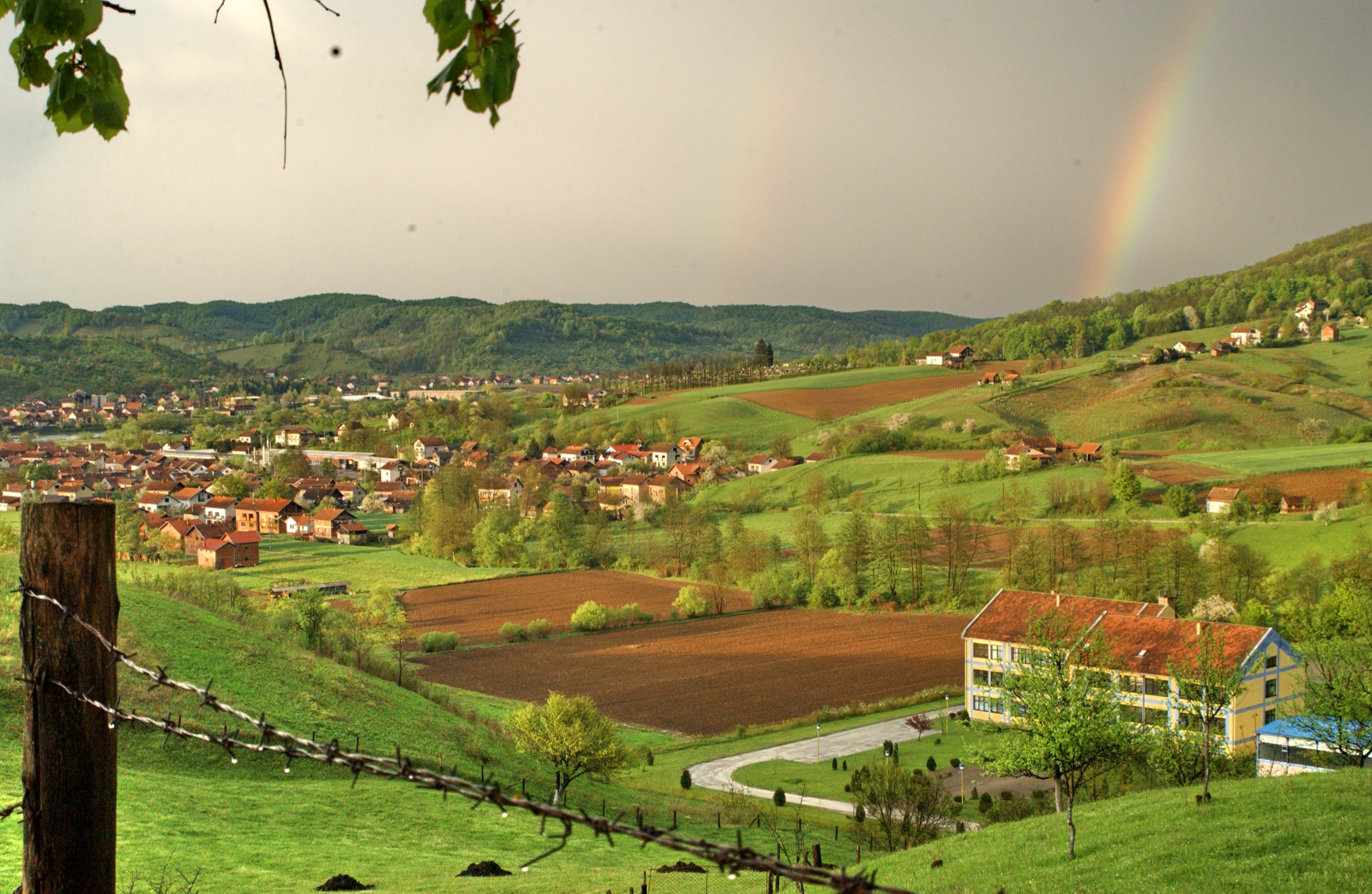
- Kostajnica

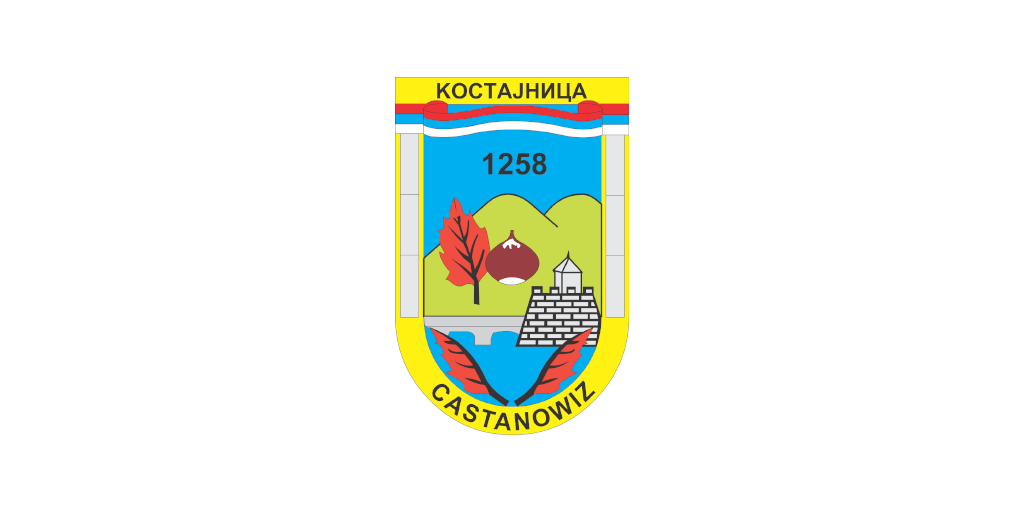
- Flag Coat of arms
- Nickname: The town of chestnuts

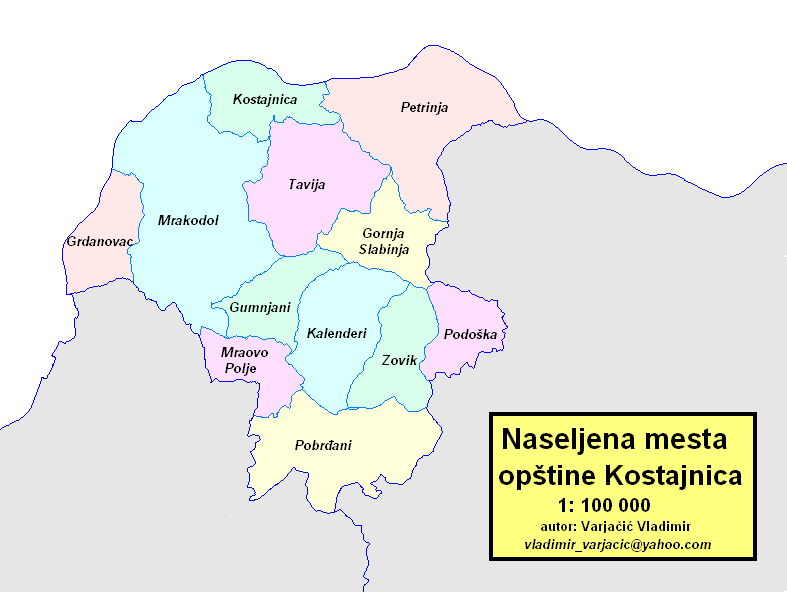

- Location within Republika Srpska Location within Bosnia and Herzegovina
- Coordinates: 45°13′N 16°32′E
- Country: Bosnia and Herzegovina
- Entity: Republika Srpska
- Geographical region: Bosanska Krajina

Government
  - Municipal mayor: Nikola Janjetović (SNSD)

Area
  - Total: 8,512 km^{2} (3,287 sq mi)
- Elevation: 109 m (358 ft)

Population (2013 census)
  - Total: 5,977
  - Density: 70/km^{2} (180/sq mi)
- Time zone: UTC+1 (CET)
  - Summer (DST): UTC+2 (CEST)
- Postal code: 79224
- Area code: +387 (052)
- Website: opstina-kostajnica.com

Kostajnica (Serbian Cyrillic: Костајница), formerly Bosanska Kostajnica (Serbian Cyrillic: Босанска Костајница), German: Castanowitz, is a town and municipality located in Republika Srpska, Bosnia and Herzegovina. It is situated in the Кrajina region. As of 2013, the municipality had a population of 5,977 inhabitants, while the town of Kostajnica has a population of 4,047 inhabitants.

The municipality was created from a part of the pre-war municipality of Novi Grad. It is located across the Una river from Hrvatska Kostajnica, Croatia.

== Etymology ==
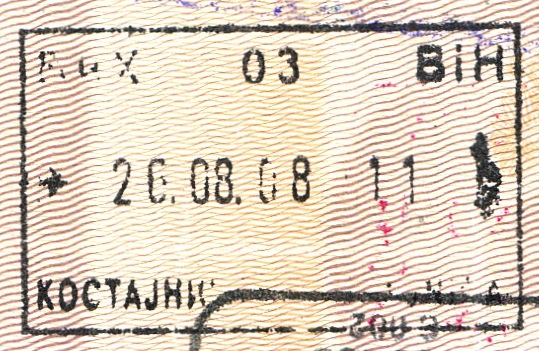
Passport stamp bearing the name Kostajnica.

It is believed that the name of the town and municipality of Kostajnica originates from the old Slavic word for sweet chestnut (kostanj). Therefore, the name Kostajnica means the land of chestnuts. Indeed, that is true, as the forests of the Kostajnica municipality grow this particular tree. The name of this settlement was first recorded in 1258. The name Kostajnica is used for both settlements in the Una valley (Kostajnica-Bosnia and Herzegovina and Hrvatska Kostajnica-Croatia) which surround the Kostajnica castle.

== Coat of arms ==
The coat of arms of the Kostajnica municipality contains a form of a medieval shield. In the middle there is a chestnut with a leaf that represent the origin of the name of this municipality and of the rare plant that grows in this area. In the lower part of the coat of arms there are two leaves that together make a lower frame. Above these two leaves are the river Una (represented with a blue colour), on the left side is the bridge, that connects two towns, and on the right side is the medieval Castle. Behind the chestnut and the leaf there are two curves that represent the hill of Balj, where one could find these precious fruits — chestnuts. On the top is the flag of the Republic of Srpska. Stone blocks represent the will to build and to be strong. In the upper middle of the coat of arms the number 1258 is written, which represents the year when name Kostajnica was first recorded.

== Name ==
During the Bosnian War, when the municipality of Kostajnica was created (formerly being a part of the Novi Grad municipality), the name of the town was renamed to Srpska Kostajnica (Српска Костајница). After that the name of the town was changed to Bosanska Kostajnica. The final name of the town and municipality is only Kostajnica, according to the decision of the Constitutional Court of Republika Srpska. Meanwhile, the residents of the municipality never had an opportunity to decide on the official name.

== Settlements ==
The Kostajnica municipality encompasses a very small area in comparison to the other municipalities in Bosnia and Herzegovina. The municipality has an area of 85.12 km^{2} and it was formed in the year 1995, therefore it is one of the youngest municipalities in the Republic of Srpska. On the area of the whole municipality there are 11 rural settlements and only one urban settlement (Kostajnica – the municipality seat). The settlements that make up the territory of this municipality are: Gornja Slabinja, Grdanovac, Gumnjani, Kalenderi, Kostajnica, Mrakodol, Mraovo Polje, Petrinja, Pobrđani, Podoška, Tavija and Zovik.

== History ==
Human settlement in the area of Kostajnica municipality was first recorded since the so-called "Vučedol Culture" period. According to the found remains and preserved documents, it is known that in the era of Ancient Rome, there was trade across the Una River in the territory of the present municipality of Kostajnica. Owing to its location, Kostajnica was already a significant settlement within the Roman water supply system. The name Kostajnica was first mentioned as a toponym in the year 1258. During the Middle Ages Kostajnica, as a significant trading settlement and fortress, was part of the Hungarian Kingdom, i.e. in possession of a nobleman who recognized the Hungarian crown. After 1513 (the defeat of the Turks at Dubica), the following masters changed in constant warfare: the Ottoman Empire and the Habsburg monarchy, later the Austro-Hungarian Monarchy.

Upon the conclusion of the Treaty of Passarowitz in 1718, Kostajnica was to be transferred to the Habsburg monarchy.

As an integral part of the Kingdom of Illyria, in 1809 the area of Kostajnica came under the rule of Napoleon, and remained so until 1814. During the French rule, a wooden bridge was built between the two "Kostajnicas" (the two towns that are situated on both banks of the Una river) to facilitate the flow of goods and people. That was at the time the only bridge on the Una river that served to transport goods from the Middle East to Europe and vice versa. After a brief French administration, Kostajnica again came under Turkish rule in 1814. During the period of Turkish rule, the population of this region raised numerous uprisings. The most famous is Pecija's uprising in 1858, that was led by the hajduks Petar Popović Pecija and Petar Garača. In 1878 Kostajnica again came under Austrian rule and remained until the end of World War I. During the Austro-Hungarian period Kostajnica was first a district, and later a part of the Bosanski Novi district. During the Kingdom of Yugoslavia Kostajnica was a trade and crafts center. During World War II, the population of this region participated massively in the fight against fascism. This is evidenced by the legendary Balj Company (named after the hill above Kostajnica), which was made up of fighters mostly recruited from the area. In addition to the fallen fighters, as many as 1,848 inhabitants of the municipality lost their lives as victims of the fascist terror war. Their execution sites were Jasenovac, Zemun, Bajića Jame and Zečevo Brdo. After World War II, Kostajnica, under the name Bosanska Kostajnica, existed as a municipality within the Bosanski Novi and later Prijedor district.

== Geographical position ==
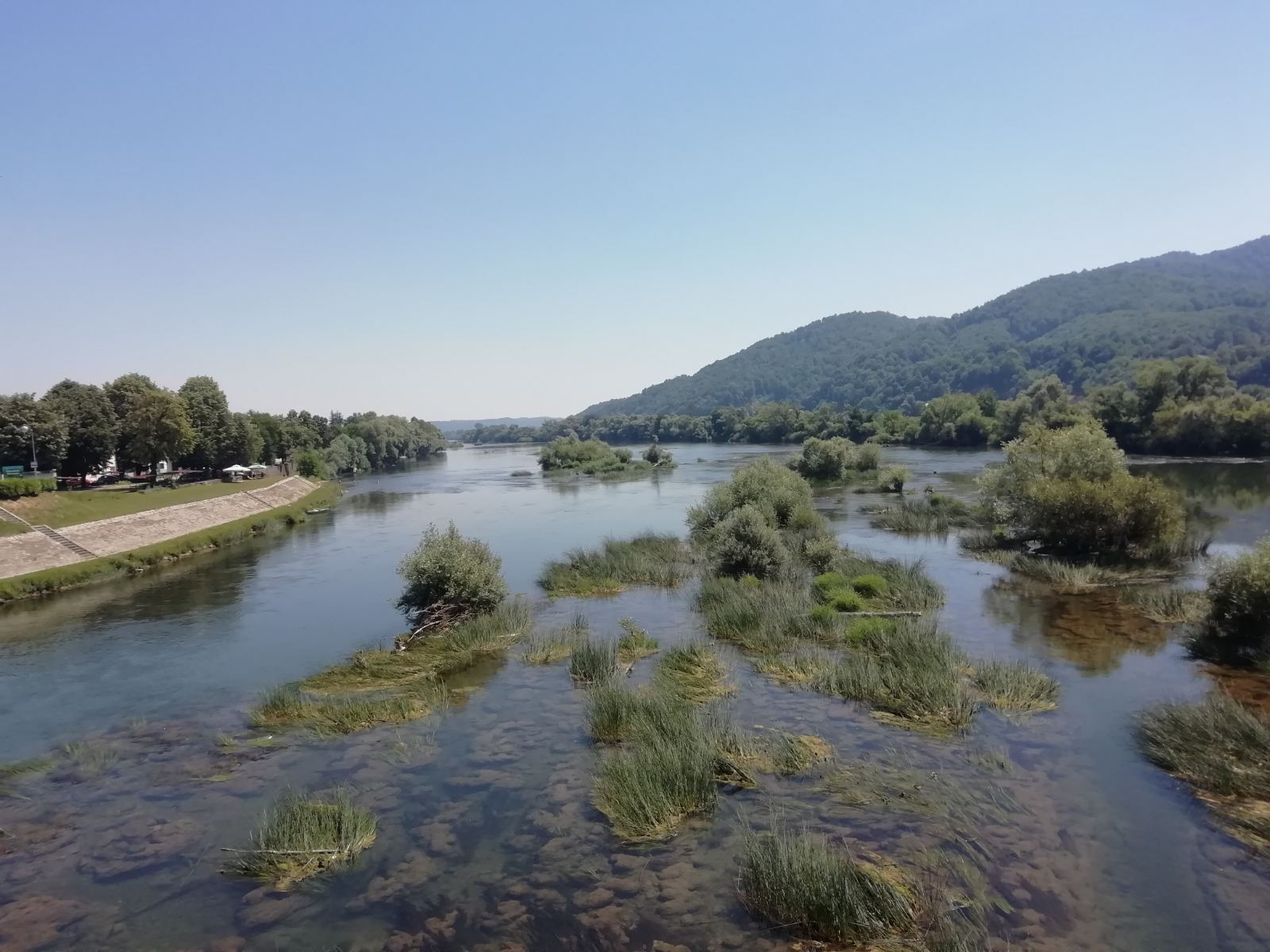
Una in Kostajnica

The Kostajnica municipality is situated in the northwestern part of the Republic of Srpska, Bosnia and Herzegovina and lies at one of the ends of the Republika Srpska territory (The other is Trebinje in the southeast). The area of Kostajnica municipality lies on the right river bank of the Una river. The river is located to the north and northwestern border, which is also the border between Croatia and Bosnia and Herzegovina, while the southern border is the border with the Novi Grad municipality. The Kostajnica municipality is a relatively small municipality, having a land area of only 85 km^{2}.

The highway of the most importance that traverse this municipality is the highway M-14 (Bihać – Bosanska Krupa – Novi Grad – Kostajnica - Kozarska Dubica – Gradiška) and regional highway R-475 (Kostajnica – Prijedor). For this town the border checkpoint between Bosnia and Herzegovina and Croatia has a large importance for the local economy and it is located at the very centre of the town. Through the territory of this municipality runs the railway Zagreb – Banja Luka, specifically through the settlement of Grdanovac, but there is currently no railway station, nor is one being planned. The regional position of Kostajnica offers many opportunities its municipality, especially towards Western Europe. This municipality is situated about 100 km from Banja Luka, 90 km from Zagreb and 50 km from Prijedor. This municipality is an integral part of the Prijedor region. Historically speaking Kostajnica is also part of Knešpolje (the small region between the towns of Kostajnica and Kozarska Dubica), Pounje (the valley of the river Una from Novi Grad to Kozarska Dubica) and Krajina (a greater region of Republika Srpska that incorporates the Prijedor and Banja Luka region).

== Demographics ==
=== Population ===
Population of settlements – Kostajnica municipality
| | Settlement | 1948. | 1953. | 1961. | 1971. | 1981. | 1991. | 2013. |
| | Total | | | | | | 6,231 | 5,977 |
| 1 | Gornja Slabinja | | | | | | | |
| 2 | Grdanovac | | | | | | | |
| 3 | Gumnjani | | | | | | | |
| 4 | Kalenderi | | | | | | | |
| 5 | Kostajnica | 1,848 | 1,851 | 2,034 | 2,500 | 3,382 | 3,768 | 4,047 |
| 6 | Mrakodol | | | | | | 359 | 326 |
| 7 | Mraovo Polje | | | | | | | |
| 8 | Petrinja | | | | | | 581 | 481 |
| 9 | Pobrđani | | | | | | | |
| 10 | Podoška | | | | | | | |
| 11 | Tavija | | | | | | 575 | 705 |
| 12 | Zovik | | | | | | | |

=== Ethnic composition ===
Ethnic composition – Kostajnica town
| | 2013. | 1991. | 1981. | 1971. |
| Total | 4,047 (100.0%) | 3,768 (100.0%) | 3,382 (100.0%) | 2,500 (100.0%) |
| Serbs | | 1,715 (45.51%) | 1,089 (32.20%) | 892 (35.68%) |
| Bosniaks | | 1,659 (44.03%) | 1,253 (37.05%) | 1,343 (53.72%) |
| Yugoslavs | | 182 (4,830%) | 864 (25.55%) | 38 (1,520%) |
| Croats | | 126 (3,344%) | 146 (4,317%) | 209 (8,360%) |
| Others | | 86 (2,282%) | 15 (0,444%) | 8 (0,320%) |
| Albanians | | | 7 (0,207%) | 4 (0,160%) |
| Roma | | | 6 (0,177%) | |
| Montenegrins | | | 2 (0,059%) | 4 (0,160%) |
| Macedonians | | | | 1 (0,040%) |
| Slovenes | | | | 1 (0,040%) |

Ethnic composition – Kostajnica municipality
| | 2013. | 1991. |
| Total | 5,977 (100.0%) | 6,231 (100.0%) |
| Serbs | 4,315 (72.19%) | 4,041 (64.85%) |
| Bosniaks | 1,460 (24.43%) | 1,707 (27.40%) |
| Others | 116 (1,941%) | 104 (1,669%) |
| Croats | 86 (1,439%) | 166 (2,664%) |
| Yugoslavs | | 213 (3,418%) |

== See also ==
- Municipalities of Republika Srpska

== Bibliography ==
- Roksandić, Drago (1 October 2007). "Posavska krajina/granica od 1718. do 1739. godine". Ekonomska i ekohistorija: časopis za gospodarsku povijest i povijest okoliša (in Serbo-Croatian) (3): 62–82. eISSN 1849-0190.
- Pelidija, Enes (1989). Bosanski ejalet od Karlovačkog do Požarevačkog mira 1699 - 1718 (in Serbo-Croatian). Sarajevo. pp. 237–259.
