= Grdanovac =

Grdanovac Грдановац
- Village
- Location within Bosnia and Herzegovina
- Coordinates: 45°11′16″N 16°29′1″E
- Country: Bosnia and Herzegovina
- Entity: Republika Srpska
- Municipality: Kostajnica

Area
  - Total: 444 km^{2} (171 sq mi)
- Elevation: 218 m (715 ft)

Population (2013)
  - Total: 205
  - Density: 46/km^{2} (120/sq mi)
- Time zone: UTC+1 (CET)
  - Summer (DST): UTC+2 (CEST)

Grdanovac (Cyrillic: Грдановац) is a village in the municipality of Kostajnica, Republika Srpska, Bosnia and Herzegovina.
