= Mrakodol =

Mrakodol Мракодол
- Village
- Location within Bosnia and Herzegovina
- Coordinates: 45°12′23″N 16°31′43″E
- Country: Bosnia and Herzegovina
- Entity: Republika Srpska
- Municipality: Kostajnica

Area
  - Total: 1,785 km^{2} (689 sq mi)

Population (2013)
  - Total: 359
  - Density: 20/km^{2} (52/sq mi)
- Time zone: UTC+1 (CET)
  - Summer (DST): UTC+2 (CEST)

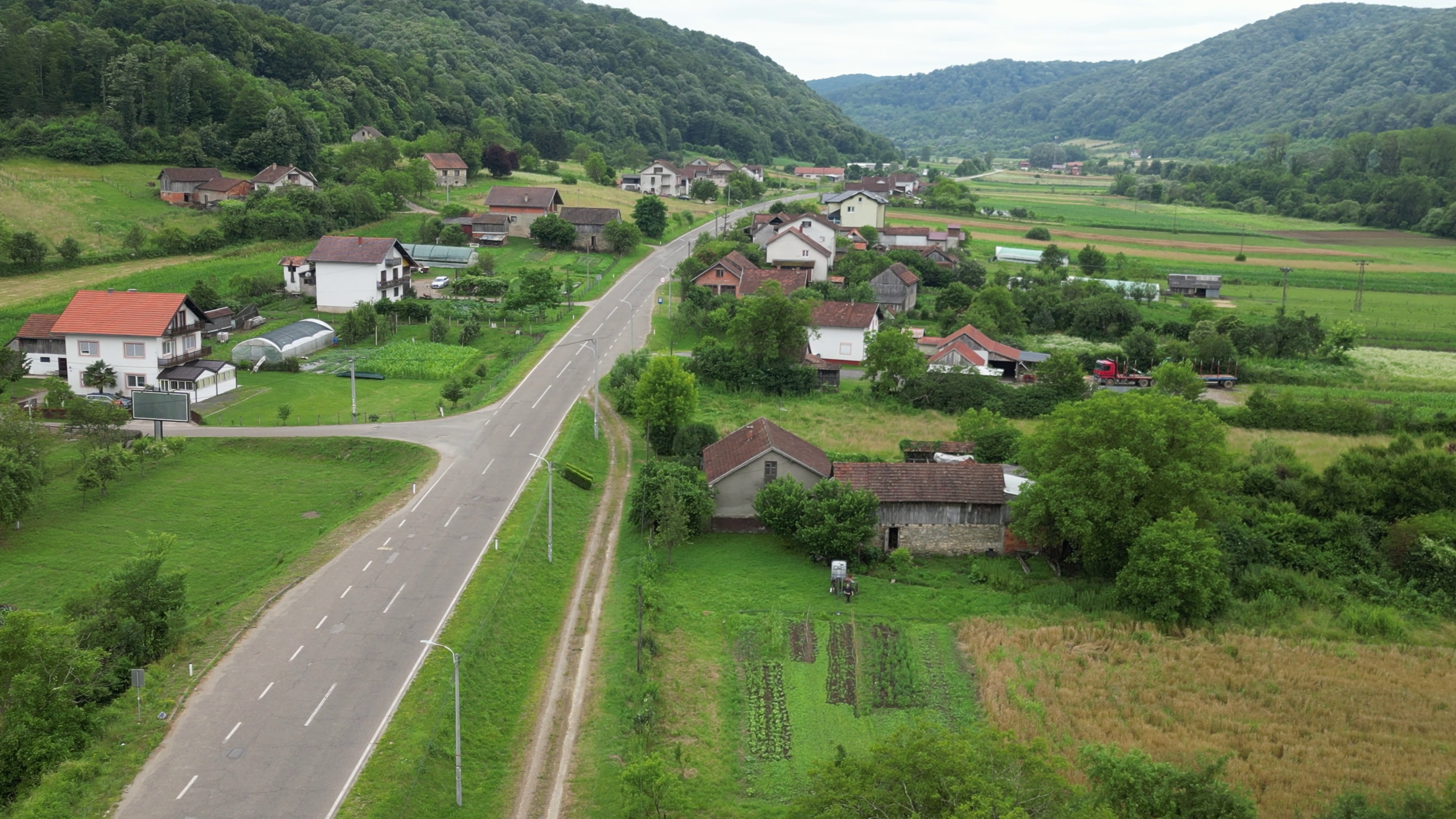

Mrakodol (Cyrillic: Мракодол) is a village in the municipality of Kostajnica, Republika Srpska, Bosnia and Herzegovina.
