= Laura Shannon Prize =

Annual European studies book prize

The Laura Shannon Prize in Contemporary European Studies is a $10,000 book prize sponsored by the Nanovic Institute for European Studies at the University of Notre Dame. The Laura Shannon Prize is awarded annually to the author of the "best book in European studies that transcends a focus on any one country, state, or people to stimulate new ways of thinking about contemporary Europe as a whole." "Contemporary" is construed broadly, and books about particular countries or regions have done well in the process so long as there are implications for the remainder of Europe. The prize alternates between the humanities and history/social sciences. Nominations are typically due at the end of January each year and may be made by either authors or publishers. The final jury selects one book as the winner each year and has the discretion to award honorable mentions.

== Winners ==
- 2026 Winner of the Humanities cycle for a book published in 2023: On Earth or in Poems: The Many Lives of al-Andalus by Eric Calderwood (Harvard University Press)
- 2025 Winner of the History & Social Sciences cycle for a book published in 2022: The Seventh Member State: Algeria, France, and the European Community by Megan Brown (Harvard University Press)
- 2024 Winner of the Humanities cycle for a book published in 2022: Blood of Others: Stalin's Crimean Atrocity and the Poetics of Solidarity by Rory Finnin (University of Toronto Press)
- 2023 Winner of the History & Social Sciences cycle for a book published in 2021: Conquering Peace: From the Enlightenment to the European Union by Stella Ghervas (Harvard University Press)
- 2022 Winner of the Humanities cycle for a book published in 2019: Heroines and Local Girls: The Transnational Emergence of Women’s Writing in the Long Eighteenth Century by Pamela L. Cheek
- 2021 Winner of the History/Social Sciences cycle for a book published in 2019: The Unsettling of Europe: How Migration Reshaped a Continent by Peter Gatrell
- 2020 Winner of the Humanities cycle for a book published in 2018: To See Paris and Die: The Soviet Lives of Western Culture by Eleonory Gilburd
- 2019 Winner of the History/Social Sciences cycle for a book published in 2016: Violence as a Generative Force: Identity, Nationalism, and Memory in a Balkan Community by Max Bergholz
- 2018 Winner of the Humanities cycle for books published in 2015 and 2016: The Work of the Dead: A Cultural History of Mortal Remains by Thomas W. Laqueur (Princeton University Press)
- 2017 Winner of the History/Social Sciences cycle for books published in 2013 and 2014: Nations Under God: How Churches Use Moral Authority to Influence Policy by Anna Grzymala-Busse (Princeton University Press)
- 2016 Winner of the Humanities cycle for books published in 2013 and 2014: Birth Certificate: The Story of Danilo Kiš by Mark Thompson (Cornell University Press).
- 2015 Winner of the History/Social Sciences cycle for books published in 2012 and 2013: The Sleepwalkers: How Europe Went to War in 1914 by Christopher Clark (Harper)
- 2014 Winner of the Humanities cycle for books published in 2011 and 2012: Modernity and Bourgeois Life: Society, Politics, and Culture in England, France, and Germany since 1750 by Jerrold Seigel (Cambridge University Press)
- 2013 Winner of the History/Social Sciences cycle for books published in 2010 and 2011: Shattered Spaces: Encountering Jewish Ruins in Postwar Germany and Poland by Michael Meng (Harvard University Press)
- 2012 Winner of the Humanities cycle for books published in 2009 and 2010: The Hebrew Republic: Jewish Sources and the Transformation of European Political Thought by Eric M. Nelson (Harvard University Press)
- 2011 Winner of the History/Social Sciences cycle for books published in 2008 and 2009: Kidnapped Souls: National Indifference and the Battle for Children in the Bohemian Lands 1900-1948 by Tara Zahra (Cornell University Press)
- 2010 Winner of the Humanities cycle for books published in 2007 and 2008: Europe (in Theory) by Robert M. Dainotto. (Duke University Press)

== Honorable mentions ==
- 2024: The Best Weapon for Peace: Maria Montessori, Education, and Children's Rights by Erica Moretti (University of Wisconsin Press)
- 2022: Women at Work in Twenty-First Century European Cinema by Barbara Mennel (University of Illinois Press)
- 2019: The House of Government: A Saga of Russian Revolution by Yuri Slezkine (Princeton University Press)
- 2019: On British Islam: Religion, Law, and Everyday Practice in Shari'a Councils by John R. Bowen (Princeton University Press)
- 2018: Empire & Revolution: The Political Life of Edmund Burke by Richard Bourke (Princeton University Press)
- 2017: The Guardians: The League of Nations and the Crisis of Empire by Susan Pederson (Oxford University Press)
- 2016: Arnold Schoenberg's "A Survivor from Warsaw" in Postwar Europe by Joy H. Calico (University of California Press)
- 2016: Politics in Color and Concrete: Socialist Materialities and the Middle Class in Hungary by Krisztina Fehérváry's (Indiana University Press)
- 2014: Beyond the Mother Tongue: The Postmonolingual Condition by Yasemin Yildiz (Fordham University Press)
- 2011: 1989: The Struggle to Create Post-Cold War Europe by Mary Elise Sarotte (Princeton University Press)
- 2010: Cultural Capitals: Early Modern London and Paris by Karen Newman (Princeton University Press)
- 2010: Cosmopolitical Claims: Turkish-German Literatures from Nadolny to Pamuk by Venkat Mani (University of Iowa Press)

== Silver medalists ==
- 2024: Eurasia without Borders: The Dream of a Leftist Literary Commons by Katerina Clark (Harvard University Press)
- 2023: Muslims and the Making of Modern Europe by Emily Greble (Oxford University Press)
- 2023: Statelessness: A Modern History by Mira L. Siegelberg (Harvard University Press)
- 2022: The Ruins Lesson: Meaning and Material in Western Culture by Susan Stewart (University of Chicago Press)
- 2021: Manual for Survival: A Chernobyl Guide to the Future by Kate Brown (W. W. Norton & Company)
- 2021: From Triumph to Crisis: Neoliberal Economic Reform in Post-communist Countries by Hilary Appel & Mitchell A. Orenstein (Cambridge University Press)
- 2020: Colonial al-Andalus: Spain and the Making of Modern Moroccan Culture by Eric Calderwood (The Belknap Press of Harvard University Press)
- 2020: Restoration: The Fall of Napolean in the Course of European Art, 1812-1820 by Thomas Crow (Princeton University Press)

== Past jurors ==
Past final jurors have included international scholars holding a number of significant academic positions, including the following:

- Laura Lee Downs, Professor of History, European University Institute, 2023 Prize
- Brad S. Gregory, Henkels Family College Professor of History, University of Notre Dame, 2023 Prize
- Katy Hayward, Professor of Political Sociology, Queen’s University, Belfast, 2023 Prize
- Eileen M. Hunt, Professor of Political Science, University of Notre Dame, 2023 Prize
- Helmut Walser Smith, Martha Rivers Ingram Professor of History, Vanderbilt University, 2023 Prize
- Edyta Bojanowska, Professor of Slavic Languages and Literatures and chair of the European Studies Council at the MacMillan Center, Yale University, 2022 Prize
- Stephen M. Fallon, The Rev. John J. Cavanaugh, C.S.C., Professor of the Humanities, University of Notre Dame, 2022 Prize
- Robin Jensen, The Patrick O’Brien Professor of Theology, University of Notre Dame, 2022 Prize
- Siobhán McIlvanney, Professor of French and Francophone Women’s Writing, King’s College London, 2022 Prize
- Lenart Škof, Professor of Philosophy and Religion and Head of the Institute for Philosophical Studies, Science and Research Center Koper (ZRS Koper), Slovenia, 2022 Prize
- Pamela Ballinger, Professor of History and Fred Cuny Chair in the History of Human Rights, University of Michigan, 2021 Prize
- Semion Lyandres, Professor of History, University of Notre Dame, 2021 Prize
- A. James McAdams, William M. Scholl Professor of International Affairs, University of Notre Dame, 2021 Prize
- Jan Palmowski, Secretary-General of the Guild of European Research-Intensive Universities and Professor of Modern History, University of Warwick, 2021 Prize
- Sonja Puntscher Riekmann, Professor Emerita of Political Theory and European Politics at the University of Salzburg and Research Fellow at the Salzburg Centre of European Union Studies, 2021 Prize
- Dudley Andrew, R. Selden Rose Professor of Film and Comparative Literature, Yale University, 2020 Prize
- JoAnn DellaNeva, Professor of Romance Languages and Literatures and Academic Director of Notre Dame’s London Global Gateway, University of Notre Dame, 2020 Prize
- Lydia Goehr, Professor of Philosophy, Columbia University, 2020 Prize
- Michael Jennings, Class of 1900 Professor of Modern Languages and Professor of German, Princeton University, 2020 Prize
- Declan Kiberd, Donald and Marilyn Keough Professor Emeritus of Irish Studies, University of Notre Dame, 2020 Prize
- Ruth Abbey, Professor of Political Science, University of Notre Dame, 2019 Prize
- Jeffrey J. Anderson, Graf Goltz Professor and Director of the BMW Center for German and European Studies, Georgetown University, 2019 Prize
- Alexander Martin, Professor of History, University of Notre Dame, 2019 Prize
- John Merriman, Charles Seymour Professor of History, Yale University, 2019 Prize
- Susan G. Pedersen, Gouverneur Morris Professor of History, Columbia University, 2019 Prize
- James Chandler, Barbara E. & Richard J. Franke Distinguished Service Professor and director of the Franke Institute for the Humanities, University of Chicago, 2018 Prize
- William Donahue, John J. Cavanaugh, C.S.C. Professor of the Humanities, University of Notre Dame, 2018 Prize
- Dennis Doordan, Professor of Architecture and Design and Associate Dean of Research, Scholarship, and Creative Work in the School of Architecture, 2018 Prize
- Heather Dubrow, John D. Boyd, S.J. Chair in the Poetic Imagination, Fordham University, 2018 Prize
- Mark Lilla, professor of humanities, Columbia University, 2018 Prize
- George W. Breslauer, faculty director of the Magnes Collection of Jewish Art and Life and executive vice chancellor and provost, Emeritus, University of California, Berkeley, 2017 Prize
- E. Mark Cummings, professor and Notre Dame Chair in Psychology, University of Notre Dame, 2017 Prize
- Geoff Eley, Karl Pohrt Distinguished University Professor of Contemporary History, University of Michigan, 2017 Prize
- Patrick Griffen, Madden-Hennebry Professor of History, University of Notre Dame, 2017 Prize
- Adele Lindenmeyr, dean of the College of Liberal Arts and Sciences and professor of history, Villanova University, 2017 Prize
- Karl Ameriks, McMahon-Hank Professor of Philosophy, College of Arts and Letters, University of Notre Dame, 2016 Prize
- Doris Bergen, Chancellor Rose and Ray Wolfe Professor of Holocaust Studies, University of Toronto, 2015 Prize
- Archie Brown, emeritus professor of politics, St Antony's College, University of Oxford, 2015 Prize
- Anna Grzymala-Busse, Ronald and Eileen Weiser Professor of Political Science, University of Michigan, 2015 Prize
- John Van Engen, Andrew V. Tackes Professor of Medieval History, University of Notre Dame, 2015 Prize
- Russell Berman, Walter A. Haas Professor in the Humanities, Stanford University, 2014 Prize
- Nancy Bermeo, Nuffield Professor of Comparative Politics, Nuffield College, University of Oxford, 2011 Prize
- Piero Boitani, professor of comparative literature, University of Rome, La Sapienza, 2010 Prize
- Theodore J. Cachey, Jr., Albert J. Ravarino Family Director of Dante and Italian Studies, professor and chair of the Department of Romance Languages and Literatures, University of Notre Dame, 2010 Prize
- Paolo Carozza, professor of law and director of the Kellogg Institute for International Studies, University of Notre Dame, 2013 Prize
- Donald Crafton, professor and chair, Department of Film, Television & Theatre, University of Notre Dame, 2010 Prize
- Thomas Elsaesser, professor of film and television studies emeritus, University of Amsterdam, 2014 Prize
- Caryl Emerson, A. Watson Armour III University Professor of Slavic Languages and Literatures, Princeton University, 2012 Prize
- Laura Engelstein, Henry S. McNeil Professor of History, Yale University, 2011 Prize
- Felipe Fernández-Armesto, William P. Reynolds Professor of History, University of Notre Dame, 2011 Prize
- Margaret W. Ferguson, professor of English, University of California, Davis, 2010 Prize
- Christopher B. Fox, professor of English and director of the Keough-Naughton Institute for Irish Studies, University of Notre Dame, 2010 Prize
- John E. Hare, Noah Porter Professor of Philosophical Theology, Yale Divinity School, Yale University, 2016 Prize
- Jennifer Herdt, Gilbert L. Stark Professor of Christian Ethics, Yale Divinity School, 2014 Prize
- Peter Holland, McMeel Family Chair in Shakespeare Studies, University of Notre Dame, 2014 Prize
- Don Howard, professor of philosophy and director of the Reilly Center for Science, Technology, and Values, University of Notre Dame, 2012 Prize
- Harold James, Claude and Lore Kelly Professor in European Studies and director, Program in Contemporary European Politics and Society, Princeton University, 2013 Prize
- Jytte Klausen, Lawrence A. Wien Professor of International Cooperation, Brandeis University, 2013 Prize
- Alasdair MacIntyre, professor of philosophy emeritus, University of Note Dame, 2014 Prize
- Suzanne L. Marchand, professor of history, Louisiana State University, 2012 Prize
- Norman M. Naimark, Robert and Florence McDonnell Professor of Eastern European Studies and director of the Division of International, Comparative, and Area Studies, Stanford University, 2013 Prize
- Thomas F. X. Noble, professor of history, University of Notre Dame, 2013 Prize
- Anne Lake Prescott, senior scholar and Emerita Helen Goodhart Altschul Professor of English, Barnard College, Columbia University, 2016 Prize
- Mark W. Roche, Rev. Edmund P. Joyce, C.S.C. Professor of German Language and Literature, University of Notre Dame, 2012 Prize
- Ingrid Rowland, professor of architecture, University of Notre Dame Rome Global Gateway, School of Architecture, University of Notre Dame, 2016 Prize
- Roger Scruton, senior fellow, Ethics & Public Policy Center in Washington, D.C., 2016 Prize
- James Sheehan, Dickason Professor in the Humanities, Emeritus, Stanford University, 2011 Prize
- Paul Woodruff, professor of philosophy and inaugural dean of the School of Undergraduate Studies, University of Texas at Austin, 2012 Prize
- Catherine Zuckert, Nancy Reeves Dreux Professor of Political Science, University of Notre Dame, 2011 Prize
- Michael Zuckert, Nancy R. Dreux Professor of Political Science, University of Notre Dame, 2015 Prize
