= Tavija =

Tavija Тавија
- Village
- Location within Bosnia and Herzegovina
- Coordinates: 45°11′49″N 16°33′02″E
- Country: Bosnia and Herzegovina
- Entity: Republika Srpska
- Municipality: Kostajnica

Area
  - Total: 8.64 km^{2} (3.34 sq mi)

Population (2013)
  - Total: 575
  - Density: 67/km^{2} (170/sq mi)
- Time zone: UTC+1 (CET)
  - Summer (DST): UTC+2 (CEST)

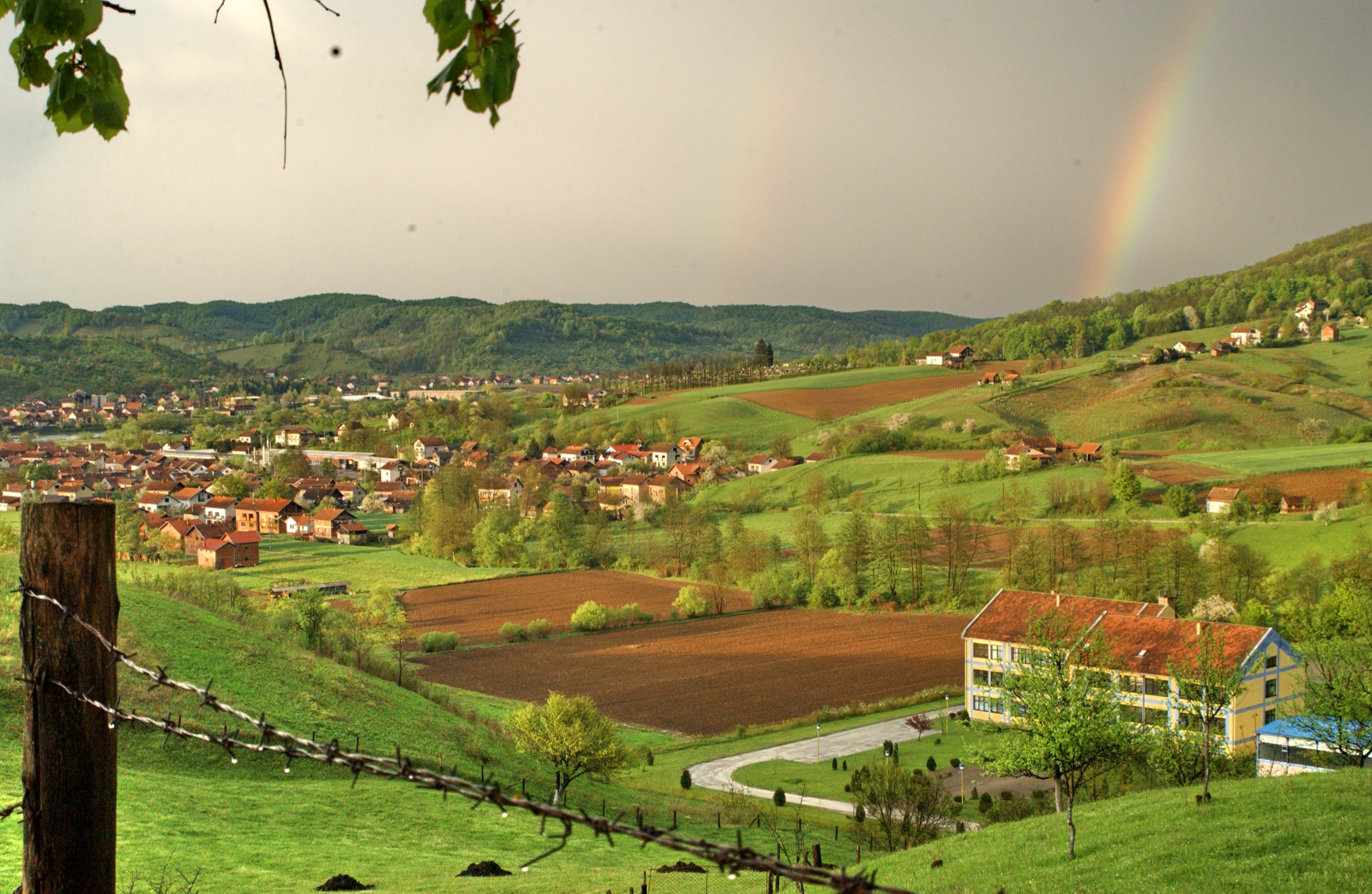
Kostajnica landscape photo near a local high school

Tavija (Cyrillic: Тавија) is a village in the municipality of Kostajnica, Republika Srpska, Bosnia and Herzegovina.
