= Oćevija =

Village in Vareš, Bosnia and Herzegovina

- Village
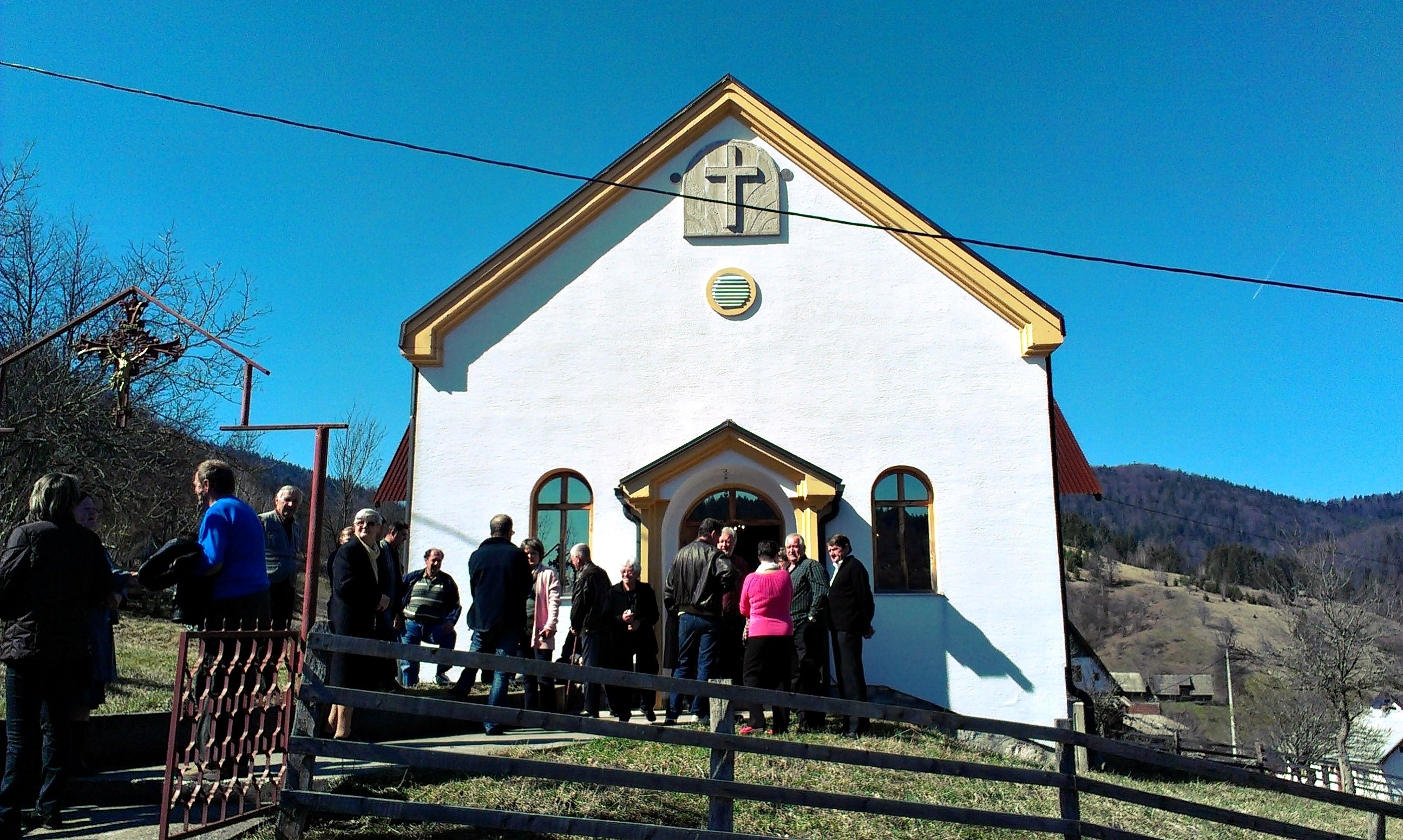

- Location within Bosnia and Herzegovina
- Coordinates: 44.1671972°N 18.4585787°E
- Country: Bosnia and Herzegovina
- Entity: Federation of Bosnia and Herzegovina
- Canton: Zenica-Doboj
- Municipality: Vareš

Area
  - Total: 5.08 sq mi (13.16 km^{2})

Population (2013)
  - Total: 79
  - Density: 16/sq mi (6.0/km^{2})
- Time zone: UTC+1 (CET)
  - Summer (DST): UTC+2 (CEST)

Oćevija is a village in the municipality of Vareš, Bosnia and Herzegovina. It was formerly known as Očevlje Gornje.

== Demographics ==
According to the 2013 census, its population was 79.

Ethnicity in 2013
Ethnicity	Number	Percentage
Croats	68	86.1%
Bosniaks	1	1.3%
other/undeclared	10	12.7%
Total	79	100%
