= Gornja Slabinja =

Gornja Slabinja Горња Слабиња
- Village
- Location within Bosnia and Herzegovina
- Coordinates: 45°10′12″N 16°35′55″E
- Country: Bosnia and Herzegovina
- Entity: Republika Srpska
- Municipality: Kostajnica

Area
  - Land: 4.94 km^{2} (1.91 sq mi)

Population (2013)
  - Total: 154
  - Density: 31/km^{2} (80/sq mi)
- Time zone: UTC+1 (CET)
  - Summer (DST): UTC+2 (CEST)

Gornja Slabinja (Cyrillic: Горња Слабиња) is a village in the municipality of Kostajnica, Republika Srpska, Bosnia and Herzegovina.

== See also ==
- Donja Slabinja
