= Nanovic Institute for European Studies =

Institute at the University of Notre Dame

Nanovic Institute for European Forum, the Keeley Vatican Lecture, European film series, lecture series, conferences, symposium, special guest speakers, lunches and others. The institute offers grants and fellowships, as well as a minor in European Studies for undergraduates at the University of Notre Dame, Indiana, USA.

The Nanovic Institute consists of a director, staff, advisory board, faculty committee, fellows, visiting scholars and students.

== History ==
The Nanovic Institute was established in 1993 as a Center for European studies offering lectures, seminars, and conferences, for undergraduate students at the University of Notre Dame. The idea for the Nanovic Institute began in the early 1990s, when Robert and Elizabeth Nanovic participated in a Notre Dame-sponsored tour through Central and Eastern Europe, which included history lectures by Robert Wegs. The tour inspired the Nanovics to financially support the academic enrichment of the students at the University of Notre Dame: In 2007, thanks to a $10 million donation from the Nanovic family, the Center became an Institute. This donation was part of the "Spirit of Notre Dame" fund-raising campaign, which was, "the largest fund-raising effort in the history of Catholic higher education."

In October 2013, the university announced plans to construct a new academic home for its economics, political science, and sociology departments, bringing together under one roof the Nanovic Institute for European Studies, the Kroc Institute for International Peace Studies, and the Kellogg Institute for International Studies. Construction of the new building, Nanovic Hall, is scheduled for completion in 2017.

Robert Nanovic is a 1954 graduate of Notre Dame, and has served on the Advisory Council of the College of Arts since 1993.

== Major events ==
The Nanovic Institute coordinates a variety of events including: the presentation of the Laura Shannon Prize, the Nanovic Forum, the Keeley Vatican Lecture, viewings of European film series, lectures, conferences, symposia, the hosting of special guest speakers, and lunches and among others.

=== Nanovic Forum ===
"The goal of the Nanovic Forum is to bring distinguished European leaders from a variety of fields — including academia, the arts, politics, and business — to Notre Dame to stimulate student and faculty interest in contemporary Europe."

In 2012, Chris Patten presented Europe, America, and the Changing World Order.

Dr. Horst Köhler, former President of the Federal Republic of Germany, gave the lecture titled The World is at stake in 2011, which focused on, "learning essential lessons from the international financial crisis with a particular emphasis on ethical questions and the German and European experiences." Bernhard Schlink's lecture in 2011, Proportionality in Constitutional Law: Why Everywhere but Here?, compared, "the different ways proportionality is being used, the reasons for its popularity, and the benefits and problems of its use."

=== Terrence R. Keeley Vatican Lecture ===
The Nanovic Institute sponsors the Terrence R. Keeley Vatican lecture (founded by Terrence R. Keeley of the Nanovic Institute Advisory Board) in an effort to promote the continued presence of European Studies at the university. This annual lecture provides students and faculty the opportunity to explore questions involving Notre Dame's Catholic mission with distinguished representatives from the Holy See. Past lecturers:

- Walter Cardinal Kasper, President Emeritus of the Pontifical Council for Promoting Christian Unity
- Archbishop Jean-Louis Bruguès, O.P., Secretary of the Congregation for Catholic Education
- Reinhard Cardinal Marx, Cardinal-Priest of S. Corbiniano, Archbishop of Munich and Freising
- Angelo Cardinal Amato, S.D.B., Prefect of the Congregation for the Causes of Saints, Cardinal-Deacon of S. Maria in Aquiro
- H.E. Archbishop Celestino Migliore, Apostolic Nuncio to Poland, Titular Archbishop of Canosa
- Dr. Francisco Buranelli, Director of the Vatican Museums, Appointed by Pope John Paul II
- Archbishop J. Michael Miller, C.S.B., Archbishop of Vancouver, British Columbia, Canada
- Archbishop Charles John Brown, Apostolic Nuncio to Ireland, Titular Archbishop of Aquileia

=== Film Series ===
Every semester, the Nanovic Institute sponsors a European film series to showcase the best films of European cinema. An introduction to the film series is followed by a discussion or lecture by directors, producers, actors, and/or scholars. Themes of the film series are as follows:

- Contemporary European Cinema (Spring 2013)
- Power and Fragility (Fall 2012)
- Contemporary European Cinema (Spring 2012)
- Europe Beyond Borders (Fall 2011)
- The Best of Recent European Film (2010–11)
- European Shakespeare (2009–10)
- Contemporary European Animation (2008–09)
- Humor in Recent European Film (2007–08)
- Terrorism: Perspectives from European Cinema (2006–07)
- Diaspora: Integration and Fragmentation (2005–06)

== Grants and Fellowships ==
The Nanovic Institute offers grants to undergraduate and graduate students, university faculty, and European language club members. Research grants, Christmas Break grants, Spring Break grants, Summer Travel and Research grants, and Undergraduate Initiative grants are available to undergraduate students. Graduate students are eligible for Graduate dissertation Fellowships, Graduate Travel and Research Grants, Graduate Initiative Grants, and Graduate Student Conference Grants. In addition to awarding grants and fellowships, the Nanovic Institute also welcomes visiting scholars from European universities in Poland, Slovakia, Spain, and many others, to conduct research and/or teach at the University of Notre Dame.
