= Zovik, Iran =

Zovik زویک
- Village
- Location within Iran
- Coordinates: 37°24′41″N 45°11′06″E
- Country: Iran
- Province: West Azerbaijan
- County: Urmia
- Bakhsh: Central
- Rural District: Baranduzchay-ye Jonubi

Population (2006)
  - Total: 96
- Time zone: UTC+3:30 (IRST)
  - Summer (DST): UTC+4:30 (IRDT)

Zovik (Persian: زویک, romanized: Zovīk; Syriac: Zīwik) is a village in Baranduzchay-ye Jonubi Rural District, in the Central District of Urmia County, West Azerbaijan Province, Iran. At the 2006 census, its population was 96, in 27 families.

== History ==
In 1862, Zīwik (today called Zovik) was inhabited by 20 Church of the East Christian families who did not have a church or a priest, according to the Russian archimandrite Sophoniah. There were 16 Church of the East Christian families at Zīwik with no priest or church in 1877, as per Edward Lewes Cutts. It was located in the Baranduz District.

== Bibliography ==
- Wilmshurst, David (2000). The Ecclesiastical Organisation of the Church of the East, 1318–1913 (PDF). Peeters Publishers.
