= Franciscan Province of Bosnia =

Province of the Franciscan order of the Catholic Church

Coordinates: 43.8514°N 18.4013°E

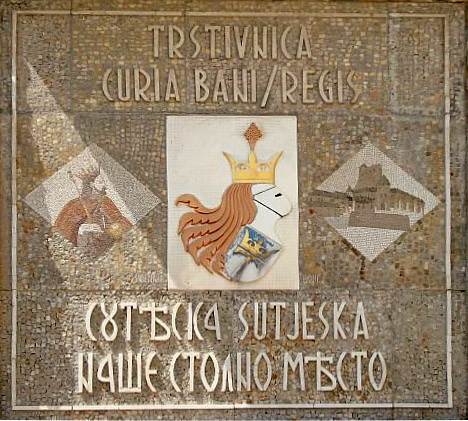
Kraljeva Sutjeska (Curia bani)

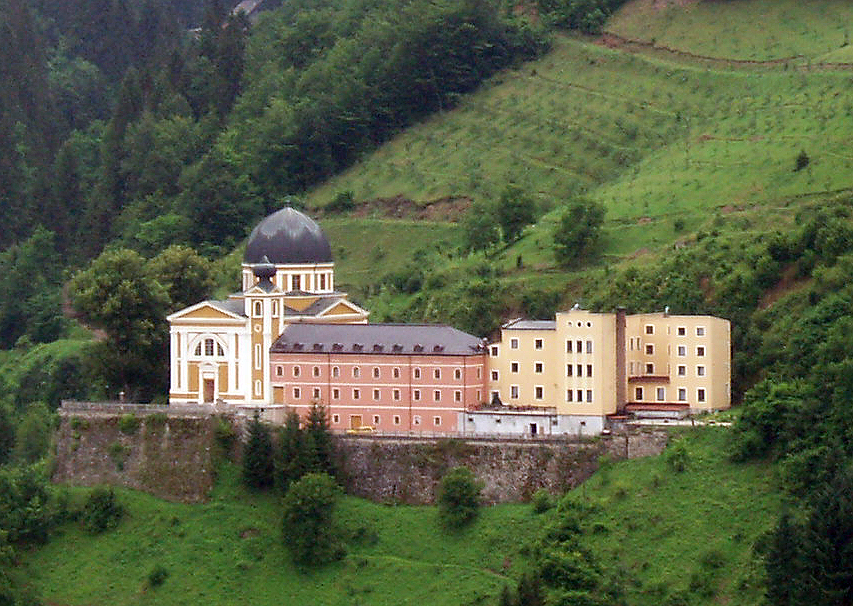
Franciscan monastery in Fojnica

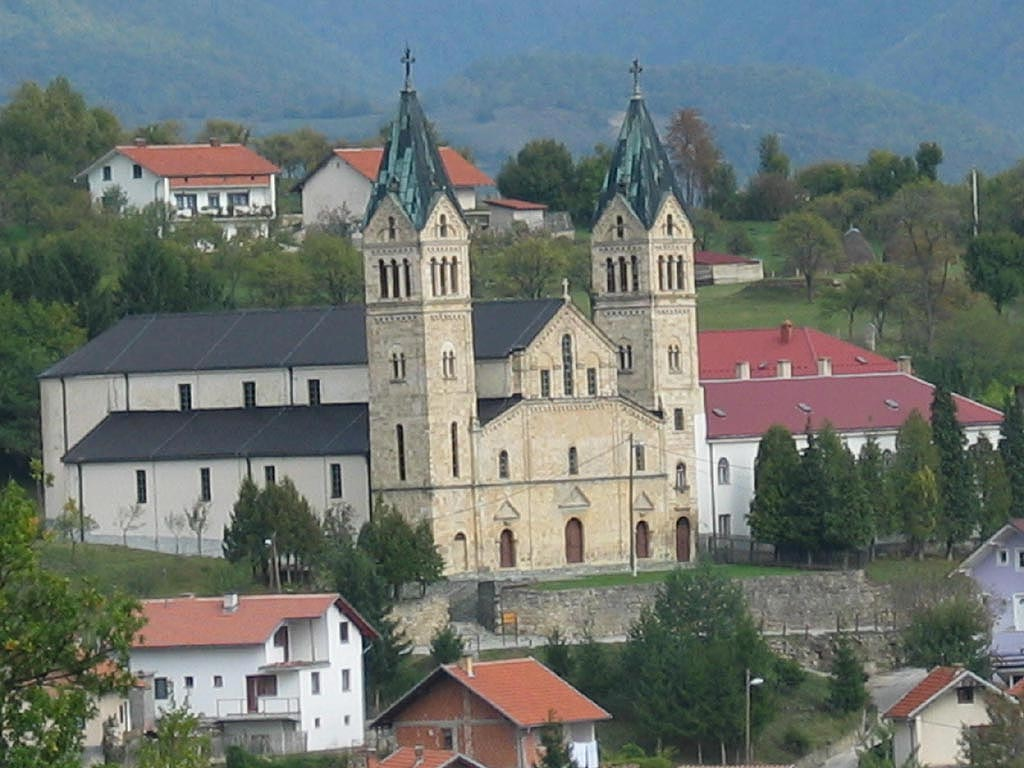
Guča Gora Monastery

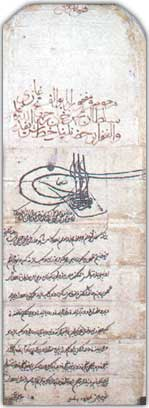
The Firman given to the Bosnian Franciscans

Franciscan Province of Bosna Srebrena (also Bosna Argentina; officially Latin: Provincia OFM Exaltationis S. Crucis – Bosna Argentina) is a province of the Franciscan order of the Catholic Church in Bosnia and Herzegovina, active in Croatia, Serbia and Kosovo as well. Their headquarters are currently in Sarajevo.

== Monasteries and locations ==
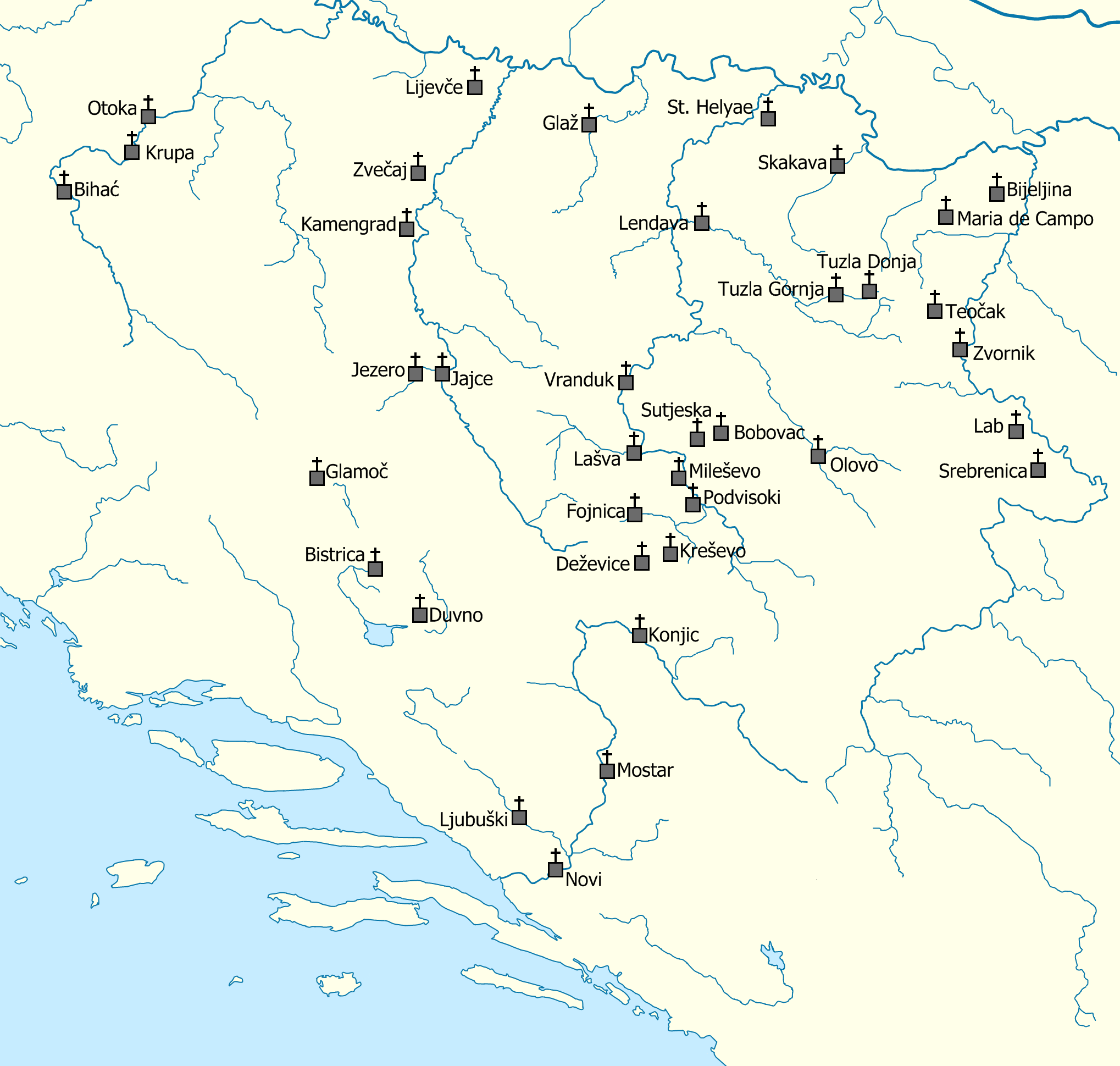
Monasteries in Bosnia in the 15th century

The Province of Bosna Srebrena includes the monasteries in:

- Bosnia and Herzegovina at:
  - Sarajevo:

Sarajevo / Bistrik – samostan sv. Ante,

Sarajevo / Kovačići – samostan sv. Križa,

Sarajevo / Butmir – samostan sv. Pavla Franjevačka teologija;

  - Rest of Bosnia and Herzegovina:

Visoko – samostan sv. Bonaventure,

Franciscan monastery in Kraljeva Sutjeska – samostan i župa sv. Ivana Krstitelja,

Franciscan monastery in Fojnica – samostan i župa Svetoga Duha,

Guča Gora Monastery – samostan i župa sv. Franje Asiškog,

Dubrave (Brčko) – samostan sv. Ante i župa Bezgrešnog Začeća,

Gorica Monastery – samostan sv. Petra i Pavla,

Franciscan monastery of Saint Luke, Jajce – samostan sv. Luke i župa Uznesenja BDM,

Franciscan friary, Kreševo – samostan sv. Katarine i župa Uznesenja BDM,

Petrićevac – samostan Presvetog Trojstva i župa sv. Ante Padovanskog,

Plehan – samostan i župa sv. Marka,

Šćit, Prozor – samostan i župa Uznesenja Marijina,

Tolisa, Orašje – samostan i župa Uznesenja Marijina,

Tuzla – samostan i župa sv. Petra apostola;

- Croatia:

Zagreb – samostan sv. Ilije i župa Marije Anđeoske,

Cavtat – samostan Gospe Snježne,

Pridvorje, Dubrovnik-Neretva County – samostan sv. Vlaha;

- Serbia:

Belgrade – samostan i župa sv. Ante Padovanskog;

- Kosovo:

Gjakova – samostan sv. Ante Padovanskog i župa sv. Petra i Pavla.

== History ==
=== Medieval period ===
The Franciscans order arrived in Bosnia in the later half of the 13th century, aiming to eradicate the teachings of the Bosnian Church. The first Franciscan vicariate in Bosnia was founded in 1339/40. The province itself is the only institution in Bosnia and Herzegovina which has operated uninterruptedly since the Middle Ages.

=== Ottoman era ===
The Franciscan order was allowed by Sultan Mehmed II the Conqueror in the Ottoman Empire in 1463, after the Ottoman conquest of Bosnia and Herzegovina. Friar Anđeo Zvizdović of the Monastery in Fojnica received the oath on May 28 of 1463 at the camp of Milodraž.

The Ahdname of Milodraž stated:

"I, the Sultan Khan the Conqueror, hereby declare the whole world that, the Bosnian Franciscans granted with this sultanate ferman are under my protection. And I command that:

No one shall disturb or give harm to these people and their churches! They shall live in peace in my state. These people who have become emigrants, shall have security and liberty. They may return to their monasteries which are located in the borders of my state. No one from my empire notable, viziers, clerks or my maids will break their honour or give any harm to them!

No one shall insult, put in danger or attack these lives, properties, and churches of these people! Also, what and those these people have brought from their own countries have the same rights...

By declaring this ferman, I swear by a great oath; by the Creator (Allah), Who has created the Heavens and the Earth and Who feeds all of his creatures, by seven of his Holy Books, Allah's Great Prophet Mohammed and 124.000 former prophets, and by my sword that no one from my citizens will react or behave the opposite of this ferman!"

The original edict is still kept in the Franciscan monastery in Fojnica. It is one of the oldest surviving documents on religious freedom. In 1971, the United Nations published a translation of the document in all the official U.N. languages. The ferman was republished by the Ministry of Culture of Turkey for the 700th anniversary of the foundation of the Ottoman State.

Without a regular hierarchy of bishops in place, the diocesan clergy fell into decline and disappeared by the mid-19th century. To support the local church which was functioning without resident bishops, the Holy See founded an Apostolic Vicariate for Bosnia in 1735, and assigned Franciscans as apostolic vicars to direct it. The Franciscan Province of Bosna Srebrena was restructured to correspond to the borders of Ottoman rule in 1757; it split in 1846, when friars from the Kresevo monastery broke off to found the monastery at Siroki Brijeg. A separate Franciscan jurisdiction (a "custody") was established for Herzegovina in 1852. Pope Leo XIII raised it to the status of a province (the Province of the Assumption of the Blessed Virgin Mary) in 1892.

=== World War II ===
With the outbreak of World War II in Yugoslavia and the installation of the Nazi-backed Independent State of Croatia puppet state led by the Ustaše, the Bosnian Franciscans' relationship with the regime became complicated. Some Franciscans, such as Alojzije Mišić and others, opposed the Ustaše's genocide policies. Others such as Archbishop Šarić enthusiastically supported the regime, while some monks like Miroslav Filipović participated in the atrocities themselves. Several key Ustaše officials, like Andrija Artuković were educated at Franciscan parochial schools, mainly in Široki Brijeg. Instructions of the Superiors of the Franciscan order based in Rome issued in the summer of 1941 forbade Franciscan friars to participate in Ustaše activities, and the heads of the Bosnian sector believed in following these instructions. Still, the Franciscans of Bosnia and Herzegovina would play a leading role in the genocide and forced conversions of Serbs with Sarajevo becoming a center of the Catholic conversion campaign.

After the war, contrary to their Herzegovinian counterparts, the Bosnian Franciscans held open dialogues with the communists despite them killing 47 of their members. The Franciscan Province of Bosnia organized a service at the Church of Saint Anthony in Sarajevo on 15 May 1945 as a gratitude for the Partisan victory.

== See also ==
- Franciscan Province of the Assumption of the Blessed Virgin Mary, the other Franciscan province in Bosnia and Herzegovina
