= Emily Greble =

American historian of the Balkans and Eastern Europe

Emily Greble Chair of the History Department
- Occupation: Professor of history
- Awards: Rothschild Harriman Book Prize, George Louis Beer Prize, Laura Shannon silver medal, the inaugural Fikret Karčić Book Prize

Academic background
- Education: Stanford University

Academic work
- Discipline: Balkan and Yugoslav history
- Sub-discipline: Minorities in Europe, Islam in Europe, civil conflict
- Institutions: Vanderbilt University

Emily Joan Greble, married Balić, is a historian of the Balkans and Eastern Europe and a specialist on the history of Muslims in Europe. She is currently chair of the Department of History and Professor of History and of German, Russian, and East European Studies at Vanderbilt University. She was awarded a Guggenheim Fellowship in 2021.

== Early life and education ==
Greble received her BA degree in 1999 at the College of William and Mary. From here she moved to Stanford University, where she received her MA in 2004, and eventually her PhD in 2007.

== Career and academic interests ==
Greble is a historian of the Balkans and Eastern Europe and a specialist on the history of Muslims in Europe and civil conflicts. She is currently chair of the Department of History Before joining the Vanderbilt faculty in 2017, Greble was assistant professor of History at the City College of New York.

Greble's first book, Sarajevo, 1941-1945: Muslims, Christians, and Jews in Hitler's Europe (Cornell University Press, 2011) examines the history of Sarajevo under Nazi Occupation during the Second World War.

Her second book, Muslims and the Making of Modern Europe challenges the common belief that Muslims are outsiders or foreigners to Europe whose recent arrival creates new cultural and political challenges. Instead, Greble shows that Muslims were central participants in the intricate processes of European nation-building and that the development of norms around European equality, secularism, and law in the nineteenth and twentieth centuries were profoundly affected by the theoretical and practical confrontations with Muslims within European territory and states.

Muslims and the Making of Modern Europe has been both praised and criticized for treating Muslims as an integral part of European history. The book was selected as one of the Financial Times' "Best Summer Books of 2022" for the category history. It was awarded the 2022 Harriman Rothschild Book Prize by the Association for the Study of Nationalities and the 2002 George Louis Beer Prize "in recognition of outstanding historical writing in European international history since 1895" from the American Historical Association.

== Fellowships ==
Greble’s work has been supported by numerous fellowships and grants, including Fulbright, Fulbright-Hays, ACLS, the Mellon Foundation, IREX, and the National Endowment for the Humanities. She has held residential fellowships at the Remarque Institute at New York University, the Belfer Center for Science and International Affairs, part of the Kennedy School of Government at Harvard University, and the Center for Advanced Holocaust Studies in Washington, D.C. She was the William S. Vaughn Fellow at the Robert Penn Warren Center for the Humanities at Vanderbilt in 2019–2020. In 2021, she was awarded a Guggenheim Fellowship.

== Awards ==
For her second book, Muslims and the Making of Modern Europe (Oxford 2021), which was translated into Bosnian and Arabic, Greble was awarded the Rothschild Harriman Book Prize, the George Louis Beer Prize, the Laura Shannon Prize silver medal, an honorable mention from the Southern Conference for Slavic Studies, and the inaugural Fikret Karčić Book Prize, was named a best book in History by the Financial Times for 2022.

== See also ==
- Dubravko Lovrenović
- Ivo Banac
- Florin Curta
- Tibor Živković
