= Zovik, Bosnia and Herzegovina =

Zovik Зовик
- Village
- Location within Bosnia and Herzegovina
- Coordinates: 45°09′58″N 16°35′36″E
- Country: Bosnia and Herzegovina
- Entity: Republika Srpska
- Municipality: Kostajnica

Area
  - Total: 485 km^{2} (187 sq mi)

Population (2013)
  - Total: 74
  - Density: 15/km^{2} (39/sq mi)
- Time zone: UTC+1 (CET)
  - Summer (DST): UTC+2 (CEST)

Zovik (Cyrillic: Зовик) is a village in the municipality of Kostajnica, Republika Srpska, Bosnia and Herzegovina.
