= St. Joseph's Church, Sarajevo =

Coordinates: 43.8561°N 18.4070°E

St. Joseph's Church
- Crkva svetog Josipa
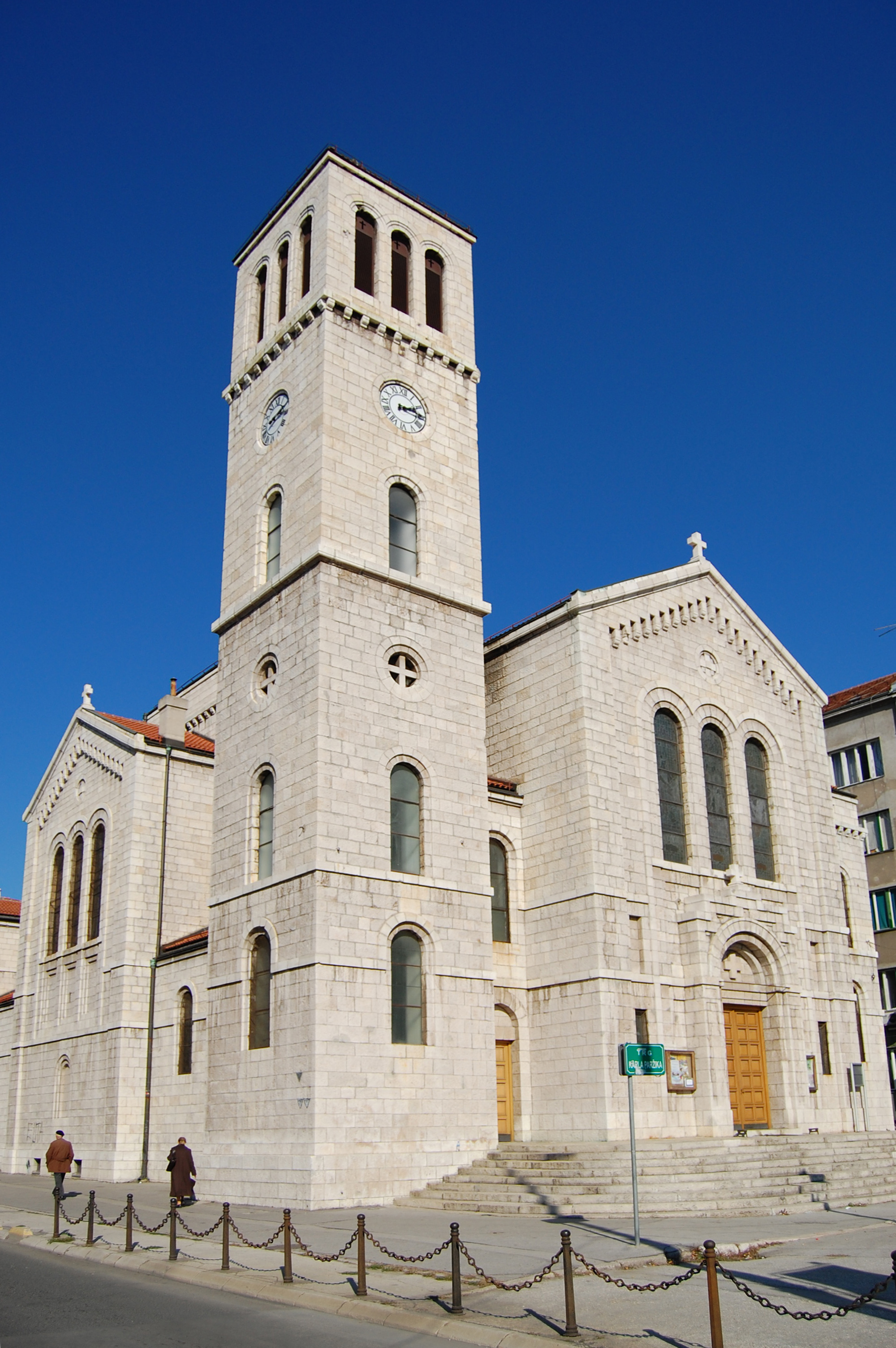
- St. Joseph's Church
- Location: Sarajevo
- Country: Bosnia and Herzegovina
- Denomination: Roman Catholic

History
- Status: Parish church
- Dedication: Saint Joseph
- Consecrated: 31 March 1940

Architecture
- Functional status: Active
- Architect: Karel Pařík
- Style: Neo-romanticism
- Groundbreaking: 16 August 1936
- Completed: 1939

Specifications
- Length: 49 m (161 ft)
- Width: 22 m (72 ft)

Administration
- Archdiocese: Archdiocese of Vrhbosna
- Archdeaconry: Archdeaconry of Fojnica
- Deanery: Deanery of Sarajevo
- Parish: Parish of Saint Joseph – Marijin Dvor

Clergy
- Archbishop: Tomo Vukšić
- Dean: Msgr. Ante Meštrović
- Priest: Rev. Luka Brković

St. Joseph's Church (Crkva svetog Josipa) is a Roman Catholic church in Sarajevo, Bosnia and Herzegovina. It was proclaimed a National Monument of Bosnia and Herzegovina in 2008.

The initial design of St. Joseph's Church by Karel Pařík was based on the design for a neo-Romanesque church given to Archbishop Ivan Šarić by Pope Pius XI. Work began on the construction of the church in 1936, and the building was consecrated on 31 March 1940.

In plan, the church is a triple-aisled basilica with a transept. Below the sanctuary is a crypt containing the tomb of Archbishop Ivan Šarić. There are an additional fifteen tombs in the south, west, and east walls of the church. The church was painted by Josip Podolski in 1939, and the original stained glass windows were designed by Ivan Marinković. The stained glass at the west end and in the apse was destroyed by an explosion in 1945, but was later restored. The high altar of St. Joseph and the terracotta Stations of the Cross were a gift from Pope Pius XII. The sculptor Franjo Rebhan carved the side altars and the tombs in the crypts.

The church was damaged during the 1992–1995 war, after which it underwent structural repairs, with conservation and restoration work being carried out on the murals and stained glass.
