= Serbian hajduks =

Serbian brigands and freedom fighters

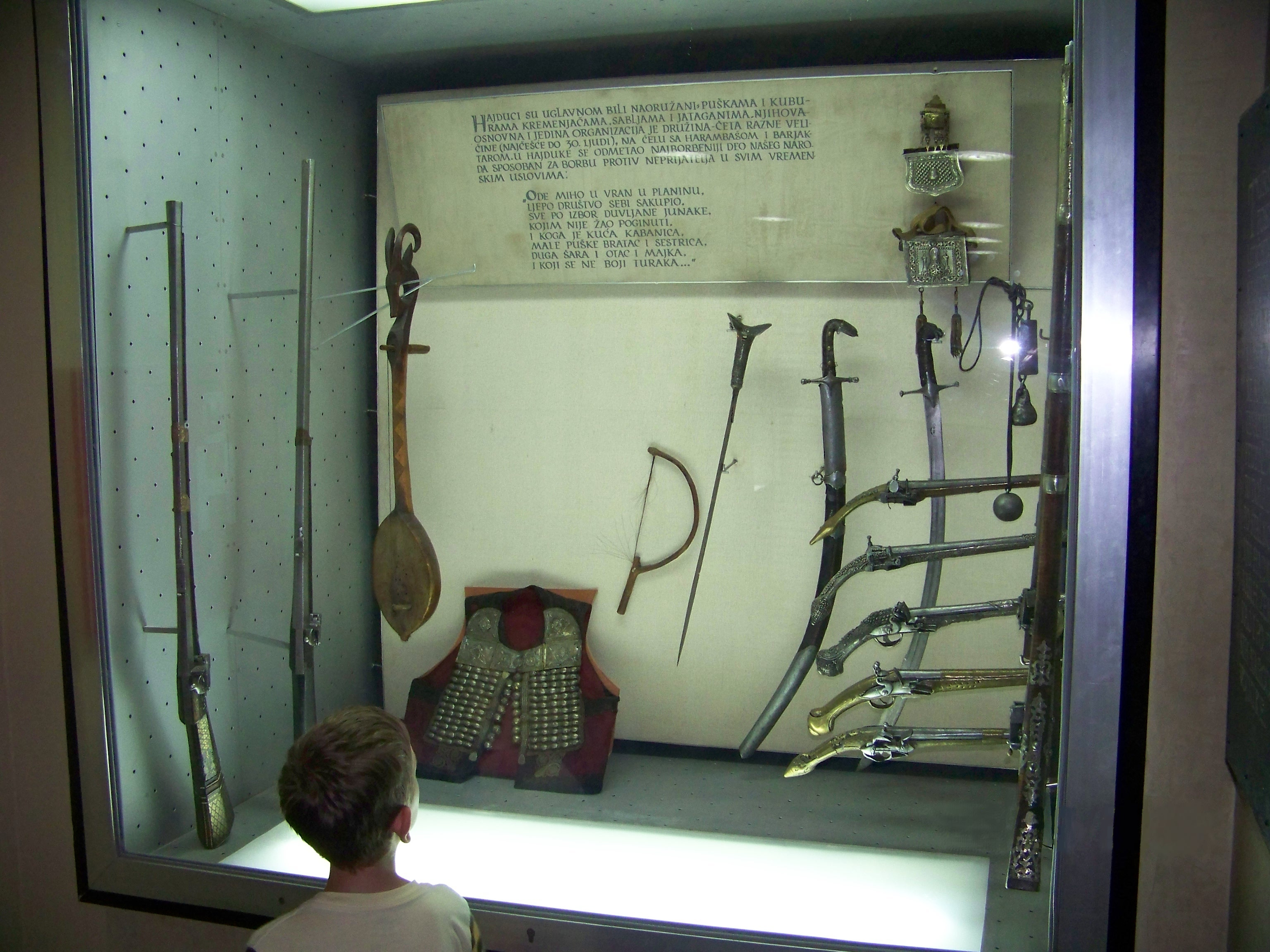
Hajduk weapons, Belgrade Military Museum.

The Serbian hajduks (Serbian: хајдуци / hajduci) were brigands (bandits) and guerrilla freedom fighters (rebels) throughout Ottoman-held Balkans, mainly in Serbia, organized into bands headed by a harambaša ("bandit leader"), who descended from the mountains and forests and robbed and attacked the Ottomans. They were often aided by foreign powers, such as the Republic of Venice and Habsburg monarchy, during greater conflicts.

The hajduks are seen as part of the Serbian national identity. In stories, the hajduks were described as heroes; they had played the role of the Serbian elite during Ottoman rule, they had defended the Serbs against Ottoman oppression, and prepared for the national liberation and contributed to it in the Serbian Revolution. The Chetniks also saw themselves as hajduks, freedom fighters.

The hajduk movement is known as hajdučija (хајдучија) or hajdukovanje (хајдуковање). Ranks included buljubaša and harambaša, adopted from the Ottomans.

People who helped hajduks were called jataks. Jataks lived in villages and towns and provided food and shelter for hajduks. In return, hajduks would give them part of the loot.

== 16th century ==
Starina Novak (~1530–1601), a military commander in Wallachian service, is said to have been the oldest hajduk.

Deli-Marko (fl. 1596–1619), hajduk and military commander in Habsburg service.

== 18th century ==
On 26 November 1716, Austrian general Nastić with 400 soldiers and c. 500 hajduks attacked Trebinje, but did not take it over. A combined Austro-Venetian-Hajduk force of 7,000 stood before the Trebinje walls, defended by 1,000 Ottomans. The Ottomans were busy near Belgrade and with hajduk attacks towards Mostar, and were thus unable to reinforce Trebinje. The conquest of Trebinje and Popovo field were given up to fight in Montenegro. The Venetians took over Hutovo and Popovo, where they immediately recruited militarily from the population.

=== Kingdom of Serbia (1718–39) ===
The Serbs established a Hajduk army that supported the Austrians. The army was divided into 18 companies, in four groups. In this period, the most notable obor-kapetans were Vuk Isaković from Crna Bara, Mlatišuma from Kragujevac and Kosta Dimitrijević from Paraćin.

The most notable obor-kapetans were Vuk Isaković from Crna Bara, Mlatišuma and Kosta Dimitrijević from Paraćin. Apart from the obor-kapetans, other notable commanders were kapetans Keza Radivojević from Grocka and Sima Vitković from Valjevo. In Kragujevac, there were two companies of 500 soldiers each. He conquered Kruševac with his militia, and carried much cattle.

== 19th century ==
=== Great Eastern Crisis ===
During the Great Eastern Crisis, set off by a Serb uprising against the Ottoman Empire in 1875 in Bosnia and Herzegovina (the Herzegovina Uprising), Prince Peter adopted the nom de guerre of hajduk Petar Mrkonjić of Ragusa, and joined the Bosnian Serb insurgents as a leader of a guerilla unit.

=== Serbian Revolution ===
Among Serbian revolutionaries that had been active hajduks prior to the Revolution, were Stanoje Glavaš, Hajduk-Veljko, Stojan Čupić, Lazar Dobrić, and others.

== List of notable hajduks ==
This is a list of notable people, in chronological manner. Hajduks who participated in the Serbian Revolution (1804–1815) are also found in Category:People of the Serbian Revolution.

=== Early modern period ===
- Grujica Žeravica (fl. 1645), hajduk from Herzegovina and southern Dalmatia during Venetian-Ottoman war (1645-1649)
- Starina Novak (~1530–1601), commander in Wallachian service
- Sava Temišvarac (fl. 1594–1612), Habsburg service
- Deli-Marko Segedinac (fl. 1596–1619), Habsburg service
- Petar Rac (fl. 1596), Habsburg service
- Đorđe Rac (fl. 1596), Habsburg service
- Mihailo Rac (fl. 1596), Habsburg service
- Kuzman Rac (fl. 1596), Habsburg service
- Nikola Rac (fl. 1596), Habsburg service
- Vuk Rac (fl. 1596), Habsburg service
- Đorđe Slankamenac (fl. 1596), Habsburg service
- Živko Crni
- Grdan (fl. 1596–d. 1612)
- Teodor of Vršac, Sava Ban and Velja Mironić (fl. 1594), raised the Uprising in Banat
- Jovan Rac (fl. 1653)
- Bajo Pivljanin (fl. 1669 – died 1685), commander in Venetian service during the Cretan War
- Jovan Monasterlija (fl. 1689–1706), commander in Austrian service
- Arnold Paole (d. 1726), militiaman in Austrian service, noted as alleged vampire
- Vuk Isakovič (fl. 1696–1759), commander in Austrian service
- Nikac Tomanović (fl. 1695–1755), commander in Montenegro
- Koča Anđelković (1755–1789), commander in Austrian service, led the Koča's frontier rebellion
- Stanko Arambašić (1764–1798), commander of Serb officers in Ottoman service
- Lazar Dobrić (fl. 1790),

=== Serbian Revolution ===
- Karađorđe (1768–1817), leader of the First Serbian Uprising and founder of modern Serbia
- Stanoje Glavaš (1763–1815), vojvoda in the First Serbian Uprising
- Stojan Čupić, vojvoda in the First Serbian Uprising
- Đorđe Ćurčija (d. 1804), vojvoda in the First Serbian Uprising
- Hajduk Veljko (c. 1780–1813), vojvoda in the First Serbian Uprising
- Stojan Abraš (1780-1813) participated as one of the leaders in the First Serbian Uprising
- Pavle Irić
- Jovan Mićić
- Petronije Šišo

=== Rebels in Bosnia and Herzegovina ===
- Jovan Šibalija (fl. 1804–15), rebel leader in Drobnjaci, participated in the First Serbian Uprising
- Šujo Karadžić (fl. 1804–15), rebel leader in Drobnjaci, participated in the First Serbian Uprising
- Joko Kusovac (d. 1863), priest, serdar and rebel leader
- Petar Popović–Pecija (1826–1875), led the Doljani Revolt (1858) and Bosanska Krajina Uprising (1875–78)
- Luka Vukalović (1823–1873), led the Herzegovina Uprising (1852–62)
- Mićo Ljubibratić (1839–1889), participated in the Herzegovina Uprising (1852–62)
- Pero Tunguz (fl. 1875),
- Lazo Škundrić (fl. 1875),
- Petko Kovačević (fl. 1875),
- Prodan Rupar (1815–1877), leader in the Herzegovina Uprising (1875–77)
- Draga Mastilović (d. 1877), rebel leader
- Golub Babić (1824–1910), rebel leader in Western Bosnia.
- Stojan Kovačević (1821–1911),

=== Rebels in Old Serbia and Macedonia ===
- Čakr-paša
- Velika Begovica
- Spiro Crne
- Micko Krstić
- Gligor Sokolović (1872–1910), in Ottoman Macedonia

== Literature ==
=== Hajduks in epic poetry ===
In Serbian epic poetry, the hajduks are cherished as heroes, freedom fighters against the Ottoman rule. There is a whole cyclus regarding the hajduks and uskoks. Among the most notable hajduks in the epics were Starina Novak, Mali Radojica, Stari Vujadin, Predrag and Nenad, Novak, Grujica Žeravica, etc.

=== Novels ===
Hajduks are the theme of many novels, such as Branislav Nušić's Hajduci (1955), Miljanov et al. Srpski hajduci (1996), etc.

== See also ==
- Jovan Nenad, military commander in Hungarian service who revolted and declared his own state
- Radoslav Čelnik, Jovan Nenad's subcommander, likewise declared Syrmia his own state
- Jovo Stanisavljević Čaruga (1897–1925), Slavonian outlaw
