= Golub Babić =

Bosnian Serb guerrilla leader

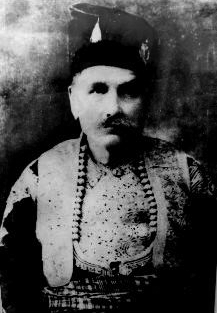
- Born: 7 September 1824; Trubar, Drvar, Bosnia Eyalet, Ottoman Empire
- Died: 19 December 1910 (aged 86); Sarajevo, Condominium of Bosnia and Herzegovina, Austria-Hungary
- Military career
- Service years: 1848–78
- Conflicts: Doljani Revolt, Vojvodina War, Bosnia Uprising

Golub Babić (Serbian Cyrillic: Голуб Бабић; 7 September 1824 – 19 December 1910) was a Bosnian Serb guerrilla chief and one of the most prominent rebel commanders of the 1875–77 Herzegovina Uprising in the Ottoman Empire's Bosnia Vilayet.

== Life ==
=== Early life ===
Babić was born on 7 September 1824 in the village of Trubar, near the town of Drvar, at the time part of the Bosnia Eyalet of the Ottoman Empire. His father was named Ilija and his mother Vasilija. His paternal family hailed from Raška or Old Serbia. As a youth, he joined hajduk bands (guerilla fighters, anti-Ottoman rebels) in southwestern Bosnia and became a guerrilla chief.

=== Revolutions of 1848 ===
In 1848, the Hungarians demanded independence from the Austrian Empire, which resulted in the Revolutions of 1848. Hungary did not recognize rights of other nationalities which lived in the Habsburg Kingdom of Hungary at that time, thus the Serbs of Srem, Bačka, Banat and Baranja demanded national rights and the creation of Serbian Vojvodina, separating their communities from Hungary. From 12 June 1848, until November 1849, a war was fought between Vojvodina and Hungary. Babić sought to aid his brethren across the border and had joined a volunteer detachment under the direct command of Stevan Knićanin. After the fall of the Hungarian revolt, the Austrian Emperor decided to award the Serbs with an autonomous province called Voivodeship of Serbia and Banat of Temeschwar (1849–60). Babić later returned to Bosnia.

=== Doljani Revolt ===
In mid-1858, an uprising broke out in northwestern Bosnia, resulting from Ottoman pressure against the local Serb populace. Golub Babić and his older brother Božo joined the revolt, which was led by Pecija (1826–1875). Božo died during battle, and the revolt was suppressed by December 1858.

=== Retreat to Slavonia ===
Babić and most of his extended family moved to Pakrac, in Austrian-held Slavonia, where many families connected to the revolt had retreated. In the winter of 1863, he and his family moved to Đakovo, invited by Catholic bishop Josip Juraj Strossmayer, where they lived for a few months under the bishop's protection. He soon decided to leave for the Principality of Serbia, fearing that the Austrian authorities would hand him over to the Ottomans, and also because of the pressure the bishop had put him and his family under, trying to convert them into Catholicism; Babić is said to have replied to the bishop: "We have, only for our faith [Orthodoxy], left our women and little children, our homeland and the little poverty there. And if we wanted to overturn the faith, we would rather become Turk [Muslim], so that we would live freely as beys in our land".

=== Move to Serbia ===
Babić and his family settled in Stubline, a village near Obrenovac, in 1864. Having crossed into Serbia through Loznica, he befriended the Orthodox priest Ignatije Vasić from Loznica, who helped them settle down.

=== Uprising in Bosnia ===
In August 1875, he left his family in Serbia and returned to Bosnia with his three brothers Milandža, Pavle and Petar. He raised people and planned a rebellion in Crni Potoci, between Drvar and Bosansko Grahovo, where he was elected the leader of the rebels in the area of southwestern Bosnia. The revolt was aided by the Serbian government. By 15 September 1875, he had a band of 25 men, which grew into a unit of 150 by the end of the month. The rebel army grew stronger and was better equipped for each day. Ilija Guteša from Vienna sent him 315 "ostraguša" rifles and 6 cents of gunpowder, which was brought into Serbia by Simo Banjac.

In order to unify the management of operations in his sector, he established the head office of the rebellion, the "Main Headship of the South Bosnian Uprising", as the central governing body. He quickly gained the trust, authority and prestige of the rebels, and achieved significant military successes. He was a strong advocate and adherent of guerilla tactics. The territory from Lika to Bjelaja (including Unac, modern Drvar) and from Dinara to Livno and Glamoč were liberated by the rebels.

On 2 July 1876, he and his 71 commanders signed the "Proclamation of the Unification of Bosnia with Serbia".

In August 1876, Herr Fric told that "The Bosnian insurgents, who are extremely numerous, and in some instances well armed, are for the most part distributed among the following troops and bands: 1. The bands in the Rissovać and Grmeć mountains in West Bosnia. 2. In the Vucjak in East Bosnia. 3. In the Pastirevo and Kozara mountains in North Bosnia". Among the enumerated leaders of West Bosnia were Golub Babić, Marinković, Simo Davidović, Pope Karan, and Trifko Amelić. The Serbian colonel Despotović assumed the chief command in August, and he formed 8 battalions of the scattered bands. Despotović had pleaded to the Serbian government that Babić was unfit and could not read nor write, and in Arthur John Evans's words was unjustifiably chosen for the leadership of the insurgents. Despotović had written to the Serbian government and claimed that he had taken Glamoč, Ključ, and other Ottoman strongholds, despite the fact that these were already in rebel possession. Several bands left Despotović's leadership.

On 4 August 1877, the rebels suffered a military defeat near Sedlo, and the revolt was quelled.

=== Austro-Hungarian Bosnia and Herzegovina ===
He crossed into Lika, from where he organized smaller guerilla attacks on the Ottoman army in Bosnia and the tripoint until March 1878. That same year, at the rebel assembly held in Tiškovac, he was elected as a delegate for the Congress of Berlin along with Vaso Vidović, however, he was never sent to Berlin due to the endeavors of the Serbian government to prevent upsetting the Austro-Hungarians. He saw the subsequent Austro-Hungarian occupation of Bosnia and Herzegovina as conciliatory and peaceful, thus he surrendered to the troops in Srb.

For a while, he was in the service of the new government in Bihać, accepting it as temporary and a better solution than the Ottoman government.

=== Later years and death ===
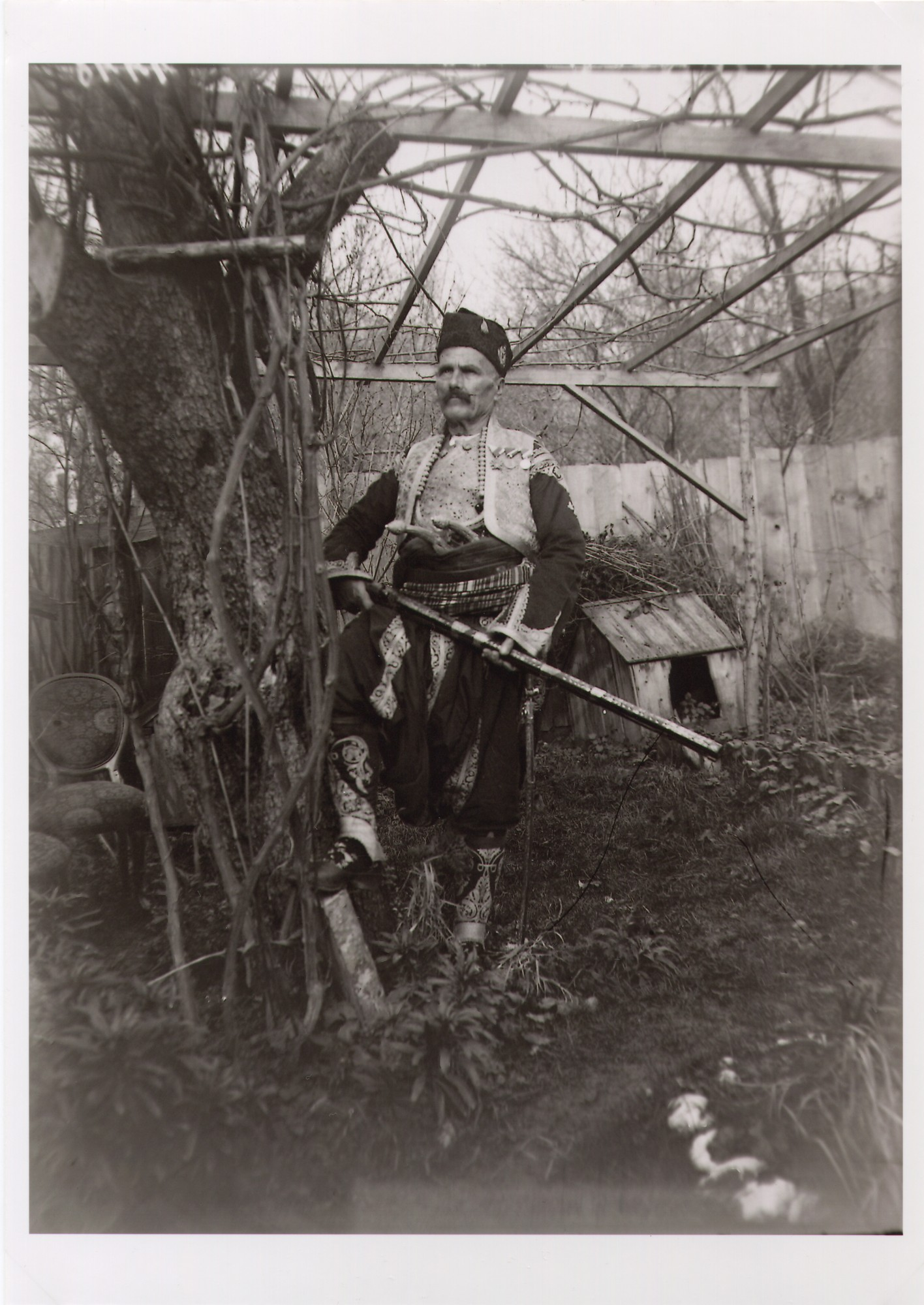
Babić in the garden (1898).

Babić died on Nikoljdan (St. Nicholas Day), 19 December 1910, in Sarajevo at the age of 87. An unknown author wrote the obituary: "From an early age with arms in hands he fought for his honest brethren. There was no armed movement in which he was not involved..."

== Legacy ==
His prestigious attire, which he wore during the Uprising (and was photographed with), was given to him for his military accomplishments, earlier worn by vojvoda and serdar Milovan Pavasović during the 1715 Uprising. It was later given by the Serbian Orthodox Church of St. Peter in Tiškovac to the Chetnik commander Branko Bogunović (1911–1945).

The Yugoslav Partisan assembly of Drvar, held on 31 August, claimed in its resolution that the rebellion proved that the "exalted traditions of our ancestors Golub Babić, Petar Mrkonjić, Vaso Pelagić, Petar Kočić and Gavrilo Princip have not been extinguished". The assembly was presided by Babić's descendant Ljubo Babić, a Partisan commander of the Drvar Brigade. Partisan bands were named after him.

== See also ==
- Herzegovina Uprising (1875-1878)
- Hajduk
