= Petar Mrkonjić =

Legendary Croatian militia member

- Born: before 1645; Imotski, Ottoman Empire (modern Croatia)
- Died: after 1687
- Military career
- Allegiance: Republic of Venice
- Service years: 1669 - 1687
- Conflicts: Cretan War

Petar Mrkonjić (before 1645 – after 1669) was a legendary hajduk from the Imotski region in the Dalmatian Hinterland, in modern-day Croatia, active during the Cretan War (1645–1669) between the Republic of Venice and Ottoman Empire as a guerrilla leader serving Venice.

== History ==
Vuk Stefanović Karadžić had found no historical documents on Petar Mrkonjić. Folklorist Stjepan Grčić did not believe Petar Mrkonjić was a historical figure.

According to Anđelko Mijatović, it is generally believed that the epic personality of Petar Mrkonjić is a historical figure, and that he was born in Imotski; he is possibly the same person as Petar Imoćanin ("Petar from Imotski"), who lived in the mid-17th century and is said to have greatly damaged properties of the Republic of Ragusa, after which the Ragusans urged the Venetians to stop him, as he was a Venetian subject.

== Legacy ==
Mrkonjić has become the subject of poems and Croatian patriotic songs. One of the earliest mentions of Mrkonjić were written by the Venetian-Croatian friar and poet Andrija Kačić Miošić (1704-1760) in Vitezovi Imotske krajine.

Da je komu pogledati bilo

ljutu zmiju Petra Mrkonjića: u njega su oči sokolove, a desnica Miloš Kobilića!

Često ide na Bosnu ponosnu, vodi roblje na skelu makarsku ter prodaje Turke u Latine i lijepe bule i kadune.

Ni to Petru dosta ne bijaše, već junačke glave odsicaše. To svidoče starci od krajine, da bijaše junak od starine,

a najveće pisme i popivke, kojeno se od njega pivaju: junak biše Petre Mrkonjiću,

ognjenoga rata od Kandije.

— Vitezovi Imotske krajine, collected by Andrija Kačić Miošić

In Serbian epic poetry, he has a hero status along with other hajduks such as Starac Vujadin, Pecija, Golub, Starina Novak, Bajo Pivljanin, and others. He is also the subject of a folk poem collected from the people's bards by Serbian linguist Vuk Stefanović Karadžić (1787-1864) in Jaut-beg i Pero Mrkonjić.

During the Great Eastern Crisis, set off by a Serb uprising against the Ottoman Empire in 1875 in Bosnia and Herzegovina (Herzegovina Uprising (1875–77)), Prince Peter adopted the nom de guerre of hajduk Petar Mrkonjić of Ragusa, and joined the Bosnian Serb insurgents as a leader of a guerilla unit. In 1925 the "Organization of Serbian Chetniks - Petar Mrkonjić" was founded, though it was banned by King Alexander I of Yugoslavia four years later when he instituted a dictatorship. In World War II, there was a Chetnik command named "Petar Mrkonjić", with 700 fighters. Babić formed the paramilitary Petar Mrkonjić-brigade in April 1992. The "Medal of Petar Mrkonjić" was also given by Republika Srpska.
