= Varda necropolis =

Coordinates: 43.366353°N 17.651642°E

Varda stećak necropolis in Knešpolje, Široki Brijeg; view from the west. Photographed in 2012 when it was cleared for archaeological research.

Varda stećak necropolis, view from the east in 2012.

The Varda necropolis is located near the settlement of Knešpolje, in the municipality of Široki Brijeg, Bosnia and Herzegovina. It is within a small woodland also called Varda, situated along the Mostar–Široki Brijeg road. It is the largest necropolis of stechak (medieval tombstones) in the Široki Brijeg area, comprising approximately 198 chest-shaped stechaks oriented along a west–east axis, some of which feature relief decorations.

In his 1894 description of the Mostarsko Blato region, Vjenceslav Radimski noted that a Roman cemetery once existed in this same woodland; he described the foundations of a rectangular structure built of rubble stone, accompanied by scattered pieces of dressed travertine. He argued that these were the remains of a tomb, noting the presence of a sarcophagus lid and a fragment, both featuring gabled tops. At the same site, he recorded 265 *stećci*, positing a continuity of burial practices throughout the Middle Ages.

Today, approximately 200 tombstones remain on the northern and southern sides of the necropolis; they are partially sunken into the ground and significantly damaged by exposure to the elements and encroaching vegetation. They are decorated with motifs such as a staff, a lion, a watermill, and undefined shapes resembling a combination of a cup and two semicircular shields, as well as crosses, anthropomorphic crosses, St. Andrew's crosses, and others.

In 2012, at the initiative of the West Herzegovina Canton Tourist Board, the site was cleared to facilitate archaeological research. A mound located on the northern side of the Varda necropolis suggested the presence of structural walls; this was confirmed by archaeological excavations, which uncovered the foundations of a building believed to have served a religious purpose. Indeed, a structure has been discovered within the medieval *stećak* necropolis at the Varda archaeological site. Furthermore, among the notable finds are two pairs of gilded silver earrings—one pair featuring three "berry" (spherical/granulated) ornaments, and the other featuring a single such ornament. The most numerous artifacts recovered from this structure are ceramic fragments, which can be dated to periods ranging from prehistory through the Middle Ages. The pottery is of coarse workmanship; rare specimens feature ornamentation—mostly geometric, with some displaying wave motifs on the surface. Thirty-two graves were discovered within and around this structure. Stone artifacts—architectural elements featuring reliefs—are quite sparse; only a few bear ornaments such as crosses and grape clusters.

Varda Necropolis (southern part) from the north

Varda Necropolis (southern part) from the south

View of a *stećak* (medieval tombstone) featuring a unique cross relief

View of a *stećak* featuring a unique relief of steps (“Stairway to Heaven”)

View of a *stećak* featuring a unique relief of a double cross on the side
