= Lazar Dobrić =

Lazar Dobrić (Serbian: Лазар Добрић; c. fl. 1798–d. 1803 or 1804), known as Laza Harambaša (Лаза Харамбаша) and Lepi Laza, was a Serb hajduk (bandit) from Syrmia active in the Military Frontier and Belgrade Pashalik. He mostly stayed in Srem (then part of the Habsburg monarchy) but also along the banks of the Sava and the Danube rivers and surrounding Ottoman territories.

== Life ==
Laza was born in the village of Sase in Srem, near Novi Karlovci. Laza spoke Serbian and also Turkish, and he was described in 1801 as young-looking, tall, blond, with red mustache. He was the leader (harambaša) of a hajduk band which included Stanoje Glavaš and possibly Hajduk-Veljko. 1801 saw increased banditry in the Military Frontier, with hajduks, robber gangs, deserters and fugitive grenzers, with the return of soldiers from the French battlefield. In the beginning of 1801, Laza's band robbed a man in Šatrinci on a value of 1,322 forint, then the 8-man-band wielding Austrian carbines and Turkish muskets went to the monastery pub on Kozjak, where they beat up and demanded money from the pub owner, then saw the ispán (count) that had forcibly recruited at Irig and instead beat him up, leaving the pub without taking anything. The Karlovci magistrate was informed and manhunts were sent which failed to locate the band.

In spring and summer 1801, Laza's band attacked sail boats on the Danube, and intruded pubs and water mills, and also beat up and robbed innocent citizens.

The Peterwardein (Petrovaradin) military command received a testimony from a Serb forester in early September 1801 about a 11-man band led by Laza and a 15-year-old boy. The forester had been forced to escort the band and was asked about potential manhunts, and was told by Laza that he was a furrier (ćurčija) from Sase that was sentenced to ten years prison but had escaped the Temeswar (Timișoara) prison. Laza told the forester that he and his band sought full amnesty, and until then, they would fight whoever came after them, to death. In the following weeks, Laza's band were active in Novi Karlovci and the Jarkovci wasteland, robbing and taxing the rich of Karlovci.

After leaving Habsburg territory in 1803, he found refuge in Belgrade with the protection of Dahije leader Kučuk-Alija.

There are different accounts on his death:

- He fell in love with a priest's daughter and left his band in 1803 and was due to this killed by his band at Siljevica in Levač.
- After an Austrian bounty of 500 forints for his head, a 16-man Turk band went to Jagodina and killed him and sent his head to the Belgrade Vizier on 20 May 1803. The Belgrade Vizier received the bounty payment in September 1803.
- He joined the Serbian rebels and was killed in battle at the beginning of the First Serbian Uprising. The Serbian rebel leadership issued a statement on 3 May 1804 from Ostružnica that Laza Dobrić "from Temeswar", married to Vujković's daughter from Sase, fell at Siljevica in Levač.

He was memorialized in the writings of Dušan J. Popović, Ignjat Sopron, and Sreten Popović. He is remembered as a hajduk who robbed Turkish and Austrian merchants and often distributed part of the spoils, especially wheat, flour, and other goods, to the people. In 2018 a statue was erected in his honour at Novi Karlovci.

== See also ==
- Đorđe Ćurčija

== Sources ==
- Baćković, Nemanja (2015), С окрајка повести: ЖИВОТ И СМРТ ЛАЗЕ ХАРАМБАШЕ, Politikin Zabavnik
- Lupurović, Duško (2022-01-01). BEŠKA od prvih pomena do ukidanja Vojne granice (in Serbian). ZD STARA BESKA. ISBN 978-86-911915-6-6.
- Савез удружења фолклориста Југославије (1960). Рад Конгреса фолклориста Југославије. Савез удружења фолклориста Југославије. p. 67.
- Гавриловић, Славко (1986). Хајдучија у Срему у XVIII и почетком XIX века. Srpska akademija nauka i umetnosti. ISBN 978-86-7025-120-5.
- Покрајинска влада (2018). "Небојша Кузмановић открио споменик Лази Харамбаши у насељу Сасе". Покрајинска влада.
