= Doljani, Bihać =

Doljani Дољани
- Village
- Interactive map of Doljani
- Location within Bosnia and Herzegovina
- Coordinates: 44°40′41″N 15°59′49″E
- Country: Bosnia and Herzegovina
- Entity: Federation of Bosnia and Herzegovina
- Canton: Una-Sana
- Municipality: Bihać

Population (2013)
  - Total: 0
- Time zone: UTC+1 (CET)
  - Summer (DST): UTC+2 (CEST)

Doljani (Serbian Cyrillic: Дољани) is a village in the municipality of Bihać, Bosnia and Herzegovina.

== History ==
In June 1858, Pecija's First Revolt broke out in Knešpolje, that expanded into the Bosanska Krajina and on 4 July, a battle was fought in the village in which 100 Turks were killed by Serb rebels.

== Demographics ==
According to the 2013 census, its population was nil, down from 154 in 1991.
