= Herzegovina uprising (1875–1877) =

Serb rebellion against Ottoman rule

Herzegovina Uprising of 1875
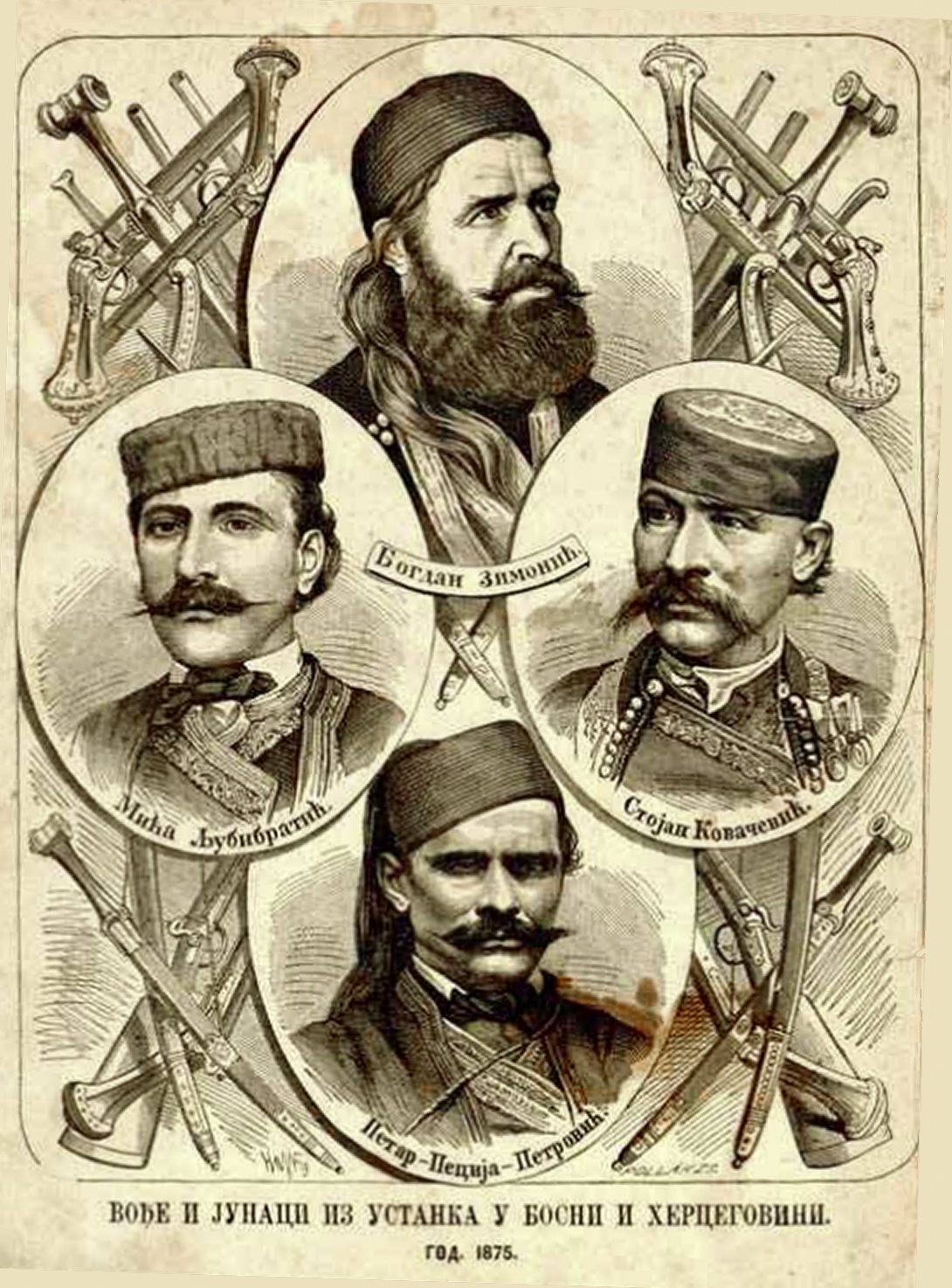
- An illustrated depiction of Bogdan Zimonjić, Mićo Ljubibratić, Stojan Kovačević and Pecija in the 1876 issue of Orao, a Serb annual magazine published in Novi Sad
| Date | 19 June 1875 |
| Location | Bosnia Vilayet, Ottoman Empire |
| Result | Uprising suppressed |

Belligerents
| Serb rebels; Aided by: Montenegro; Serbia | Ottoman Empire |

Commanders and leaders
| Bogdan Zimonjić; Petar Popović Pecija †; Mićo Ljubibratić; Stojan Kovačević; Petar Mrkonjić; Mileta Despotović | Abdi Pasha; Dervish Pasha; Selim Pasha; Reuf Pasha; Mukhtar Pasha |

Strength
| Unknown | 24,000+ |

The Herzegovina uprising (Serbian: Херцеговачки устанак, romanized: Hercegovački ustanak) was an uprising led by the Christian Serb population against the Ottoman Empire, firstly and predominantly in Herzegovina, from where it spread into Bosnia and Raška. It broke out in the summer of 1875, and in some regions lasted until the beginning of 1878. It was followed by the Bulgarian April Uprising of 1876, and coincided with the Serbian-Turkish wars (1876–1878); these events were each situated within the Great Eastern Crisis (1875–1878).

The primary cause of the uprising was the harsh treatment of peasants in the Ottoman province of Bosnia by its governors and landowners, who resisted the implementation of Sultan Abdülmecid I's reforming policies. The reforms, which provided that all should have religious liberty and equal civil rights; that tax farming be abolished; and that taxes be fairly imposed, were frequently opposed in more distant parts of the empire. As such, in Bosnia, peasants continued to be heavily taxed and Christians continued to be oppressed.

The rebels were aided with weapons and volunteers from the principalities of Montenegro and Serbia, whose governments eventually jointly declared war on the Ottomans on 18 June 1876, leading to the Serbian-Ottoman War (1876–78) and Montenegrin–Ottoman War (1876–78). These led to the Russo-Turkish War (1877–78) and the Great Eastern Crisis. The crisis ended in 1878 with the Congress of Berlin, which granted Montenegro and Serbia independence and placed Bosnia and Herzegovina under Austro-Hungarian occupation for 30 years, although it remained de jure Ottoman territory.

== Background ==
During early 19th century, a large part of the Balkans were under Ottoman rule. However, Ottoman influence in the region declined as a result of the Serbian Revolution and the Greek War of Independence, in which Christian Serbs and Greeks rebelled against the Ottomans and established the Principality of Serbia and the Hellenic Republic, respectively. The growth of the independence and power of provincial lords also indicated the decline of centralized Ottoman authority; Osman Pazvantoğlu, Ali Pasha, and Husein Gradaščević each led uprisings against the empire, and Muhammad Ali established de facto control over Egypt. By the 1830s, the Ottoman Empire seemed to many European observers to be on the verge of collapse.

Christian and Muslim peasants in the Bosnia Vilayet had experienced economic hardship under Bosnian Muslim beys for at least two centuries. Sometimes as much as half of each peasant's annual harvest was collected, as well as other taxes on farm products and animals. Tax farmers (mütesellim) levied additional taxes on the remaining yield. This longstanding discontent, in addition to the failure of the 1874 crop, was the direct cause of the rebellion; Austrian sympathy for the rebels and Pan-Slavic and Pan-Serbian movements were additional precursors to the uprising.

Other notable preceding Serb peasant rebellions in the region were the Herzegovina Uprising (1852–62) and Pecija's First Revolt (1858).

== Preparations ==
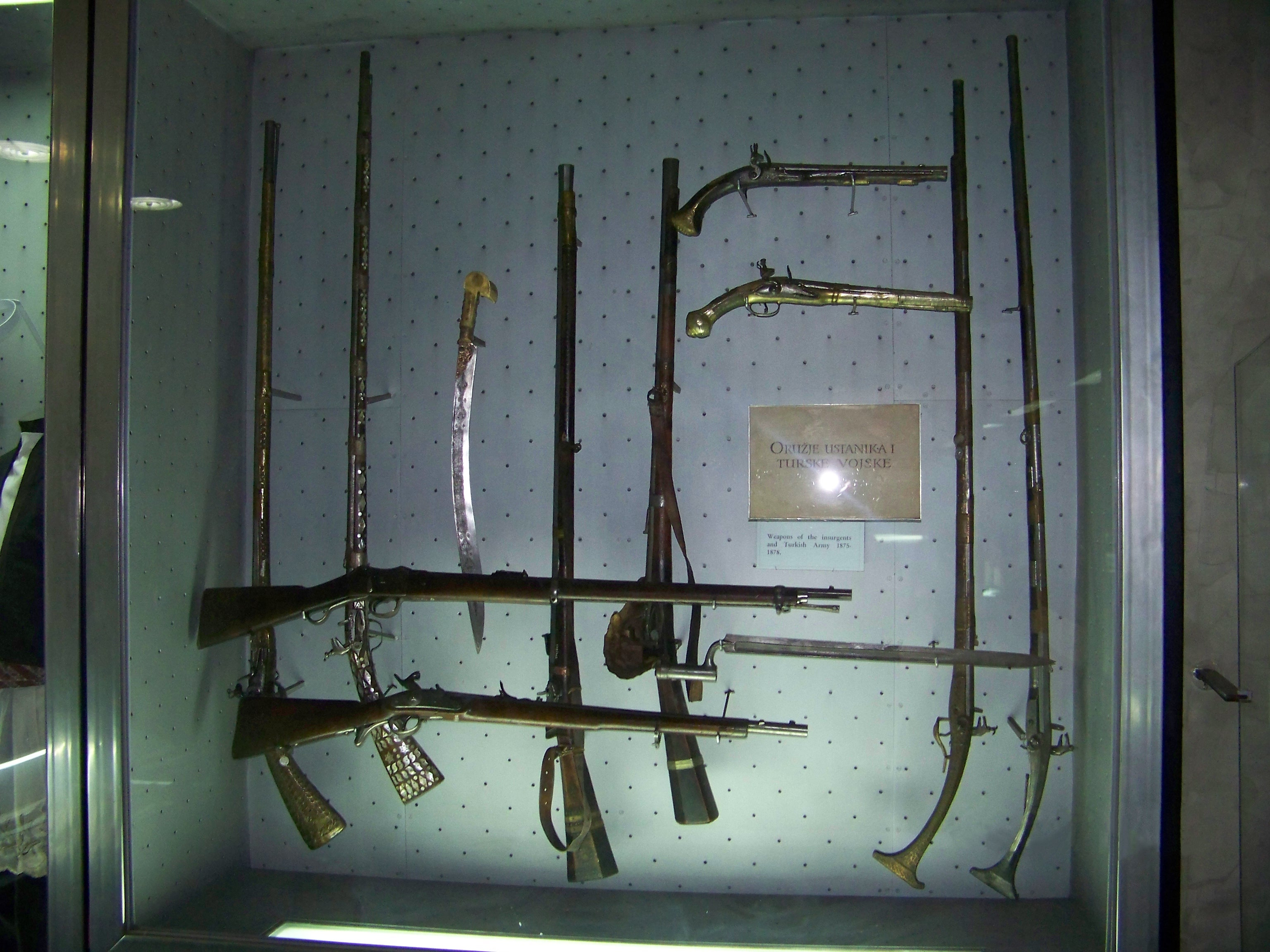
Weapons from the Uprising.

=== In Herzegovina ===
In Herzegovina, local Serbian leaders began to organize the rebellion during August and September 1874. The leaders, such as Jovan Gutić, Simun Zečević, Ilija Stevanović, Trivko Grubačić, Prodan Rupar, and Petar Radović convened in secret to organize. Their plans detailed the preparation of weapon caches, the location of safe-places, and the securing of foreign aid.

In October 1874, the leaders requested the support of Prince Nicholas I of Montenegro. Prince Nicholas promised to supply weapons and volunteers, but asked that the revolt be postponed until the spring of 1875, as he considered a revolt to risk Ottoman retaliation against Russia; an early revolt could leave Russia in an unprepared position for war. But, by early summer, Ottoman authorities discovered the conspiracy and attempted to arrest the leaders, who escaped and hid. Nevertheless, preparations continued.

=== In Bosnia ===
Preparation for revolt in Bosnia began later than in Herzegovina, as the actions in the two regions were not coordinated. Among the organizers and leaders were Vaso Vidović, Simo and Jovo Bilbija, Spasoje Babić, and Vaso Pelagić, whose plans outlined the liberation of villages of Kozara, Prosara, and Motajica; severing Ottoman communications; blocking the cities of the Sava river; and ultimately taking Banja Luka. Though the revolt was planned to start on 18 August, it began on 15 August as villagers attacked Ottoman officials in Dvorište for imprisoning priests, sparking the uprising in Bosnia.

== Uprising in Herzegovina ==
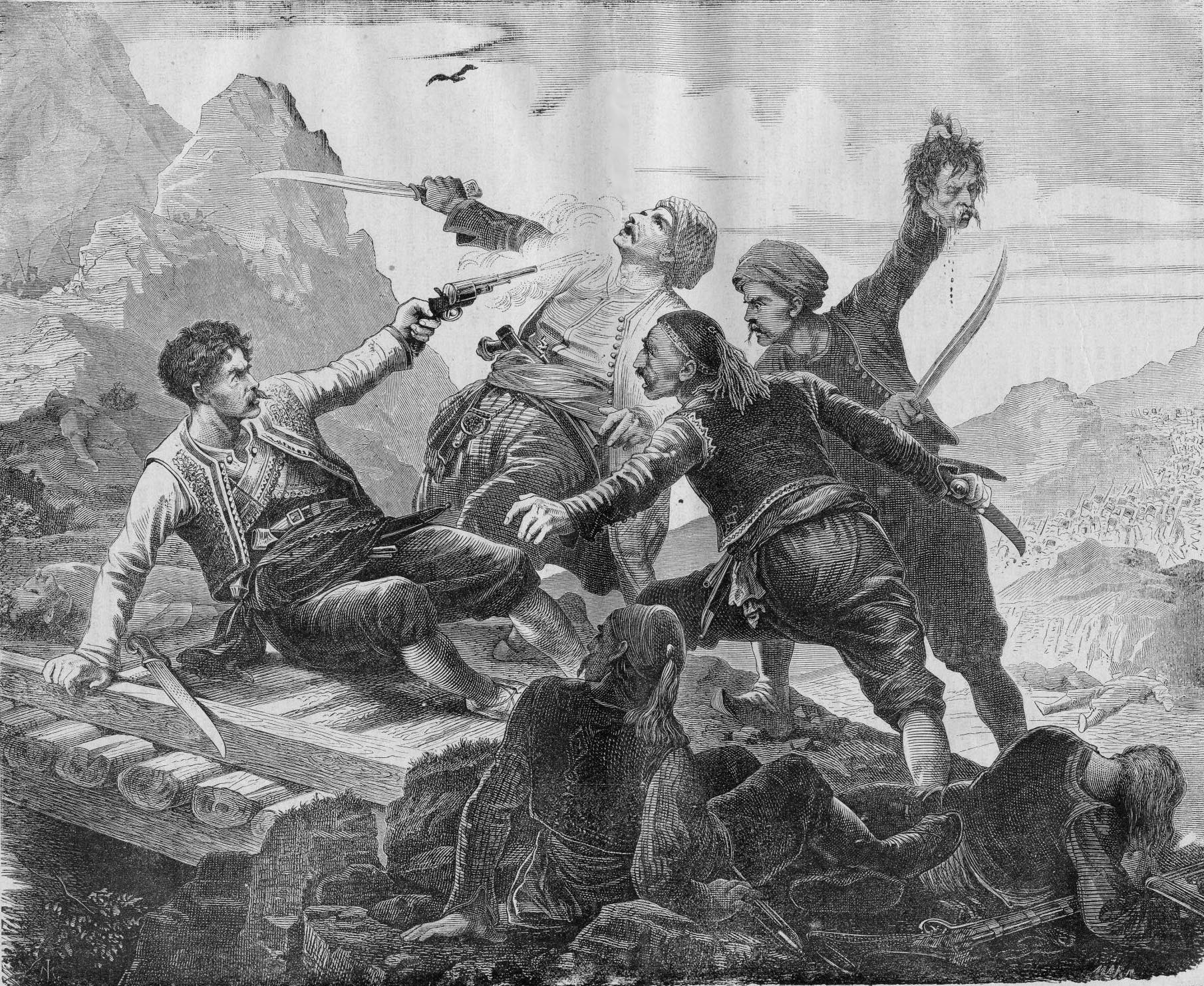
Death of Vojvoda Trifko

The revolt first began in the summer of 1875 among Christians in the village of Gabela on 3 July, followed by the start of the larger uprising in Nevesinje on July 9. On 9 July, the British consul in Sarajevo, William Holmes, reported that a Turkish caravan had been attacked near Nevesinje on 5 July and that another band of rebels had blocked the bridge over the Krupa river and road between Metković and Mostar. In Trebinje was gathered about 2,000 Catholic and Orthodox participants and they selected Fr. Ivan Musić as leader of the uprising.

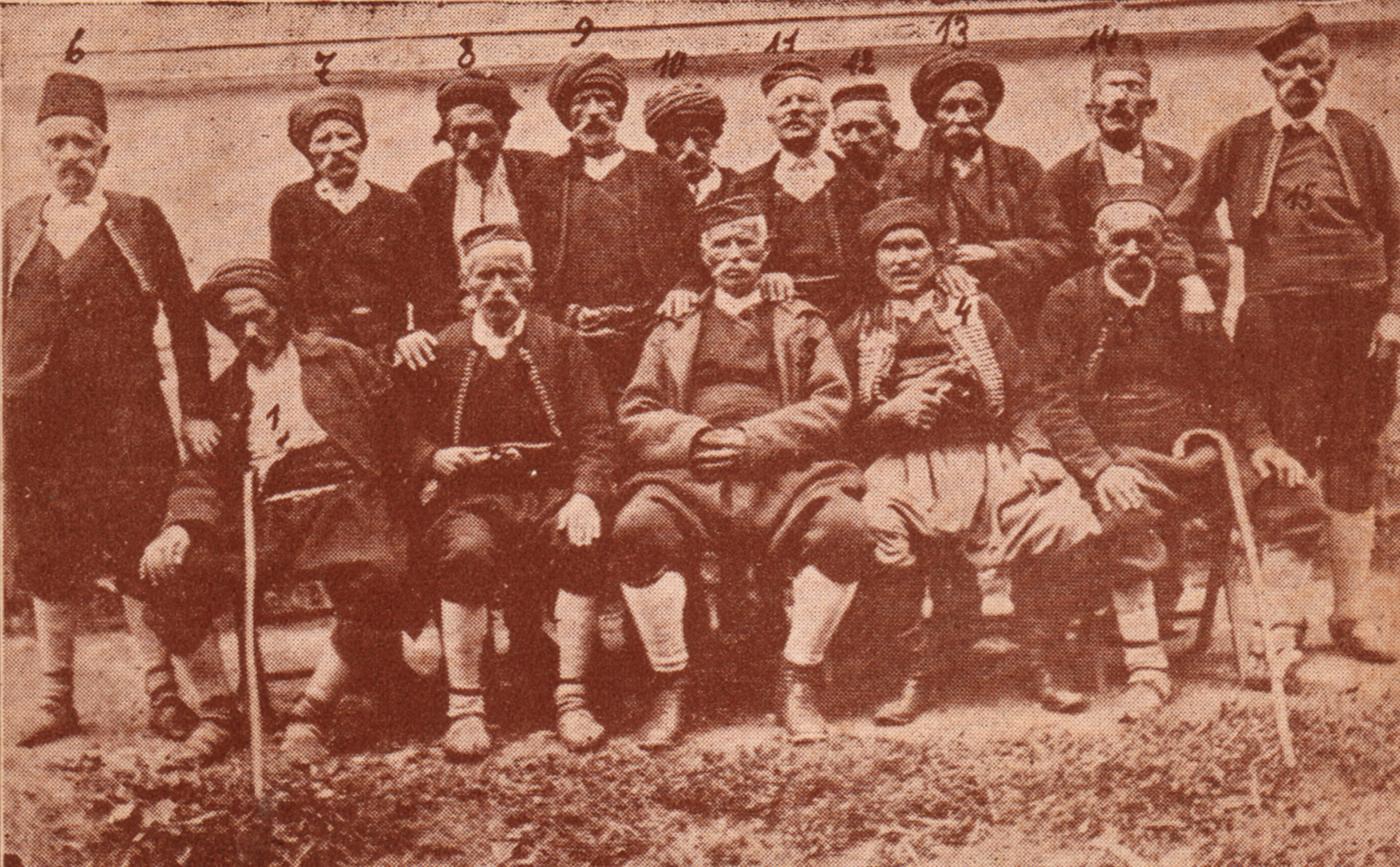
Elders (1875).

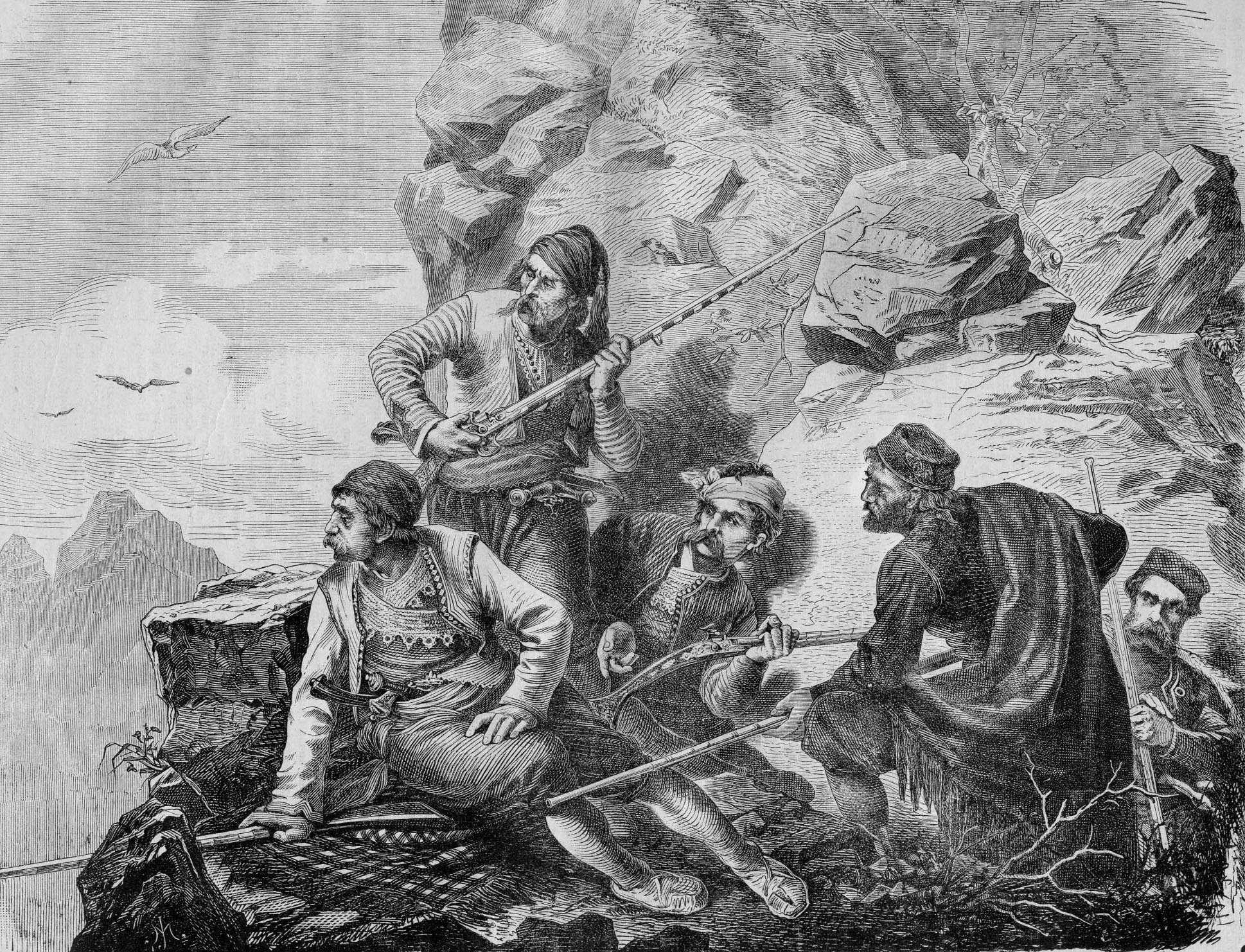
Herzegovinians in Ambush, 1875.

The exiled Herzegovinian Serb leaders, who had fled to Montengro, returned in 1875 and continued their plans for revolt starting with the liberation of the Nevesinje region and then expansion to the rest of Herzegovina. In the meantime, Turks seek hajduk Pera Tunguz, who on 5 July, had attacked a caravan on Bišini mountain between Nevesinje and Mostar. On 9 July, the Turks clashed with the armed villagers of Jovan Gutić on the Gradac hill north of Krekovi. This conflict would be known in Serbian as Nevesinjska puška ("Nevesinje rifle") and marked the beginning of the uprising in all of Herzegovina. Firstly Nevesinje, Bileća and Stolac were involved, then in August, Gacko and the frontier towards Montenegro. Bands (known as četa) of 50–300 people and detachments of 500–2,000 people gathered and attacked Ottoman border posts and bey towers.

The Ottomans had 4 battalions of the regular army (Nizami) with a total of 1,800 soldiers, situated in Mostar, Trebinje, Nikšić, Foča and the border posts, also a larger number of başıbozuk were present all over the province. The Ottoman troops were commanded by Selim Pasha (Selim-paša) who in turn is under Dervish Pasha (Derviš-paša), the commander of the Bosnia Vilayet. After the outbreak of the uprising, the Turks tried to gain time by starting negotiations while reinforcements arrived. The rebels wanted lower taxes, which the Turks refused, and the fighting continued. In August, 4,000 Nizami arrived from Bosnia, and later 4 more battalions by sea through Klek in Trebinje. The rebels had by July and August destroyed the majority of border posts and besieged Trebinje by 5 August. The Turks regained Trebinje by 30 August. In the end of August, fighting broke out in Bosnia, and Serbia and Montenegro promised aid, sparking an intensification of the uprising.

Prince Nikola sent Petar Vukotić, while a large number of Montenegrin volunteers arrived at the command of Peko Pavlović. The Serbian government dared not to publicly assist because of international pressure but authorized private volunteers and sent Mićo Ljubibratić (who took part in the 1852–1862 uprising) to lead the insurrection. There was a conflict between the rebels because of disagreement between the representatives of the Montenegrin and Serbian governments, causing failures in the ongoing uprising.

Dervish Pasha, governor-general of Bosnia and Herzegovina at that time, claimed that both Catholics and Orthodox took part in the revolt. According to a correspondent for the Times in Herzegovina, William James Stillman, violence in Herzegovina started as a revolt of "the Catholic population between Popovo and Gabela" who "anticipated an Austrian intervention" and he also observed that Catholics at that time were "the most enthusiastic in the revolt" but also that “the Catholics were tindery fuel, quickly kindled and quickly spent.” and gave up the uprising when hoped for Austrian aid did not arrive. Historian Marko Atilla Hoare describes the Catholics as mainly remaining neutral in the early months of the rebellion, with a small number participating on either the rebel or Ottoman side, with the mass of the political conscious members of the community turning against the revolt when rebel leadership announced plans for the unification of Herzegovina with Montenegro and Bosnia with Serbia.

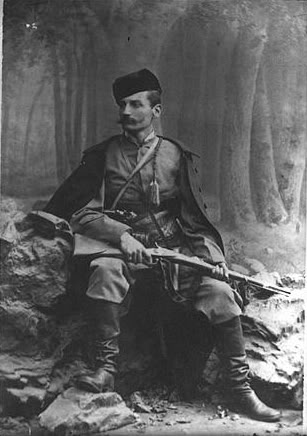
Prince Peter used the surname Mrkonjić during the uprising.

Soon new conflicts erupted in northern Bosnia and a large number of people fled to Croatia and Montenegro. Many Europeans took part in the uprising with the idea of bringing down Muslim rule over Christians (mainly Italians, former Garibaldinians). By the end of 1876, the number of refugees from Bosnia and Herzegovina was between 100,000 and perhaps 250,000 people. According to Robert B. Kane, 150,000 people fled to Croatia.

== Uprising in Bosnia ==
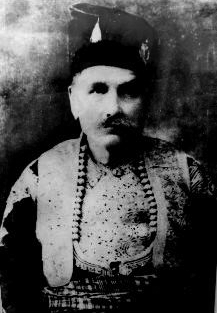
Golub Babić.

According to Herr Fritz, the Serb rebels were "extremely numerous and in some cases well armed" and were divided among following troops and bands:

- Risovac and Grmeč, in West Bosnia, under the leadership of well-known Golub Babić, Marinković, Simo Davidović, Pop-Karan and Trifko Amelić. The Serbian colonel Mileta Despotović held supreme leadership and had formed 8 battalions out of the scattered bands.
- Vučjak, in East Bosnia.
- Pastirevo and Kozara, in North Bosnia, bands led by Marko Djenadija, Ostoja, Spasojević, Marko Bajalica, hegumen Hadzić and Pop-Stevo. The new camp of Brezovac, not far from Novi, was held by Ostoja Vojnović. The former camp of Karađorđevići in Ćorkovac was held by Ilija Sević.

The aim of the Bosnian rebel bands was to prevent any greater concentration of Ottoman troops on the Drina, which was the western frontier of Serbia. As a systemically organised insurrection in Bosnia was impossible, the rebels pursued and drove back the "Turk" (Muslim) population into their towns. The bands protected and helped the exiles into hiding in the woods and leading unarmed men, women and children, to reach the frontier of Austria or Serbia through safe conduct.

According to Mackenzie and Irby who travelled the region in 1877, the state of the common Christian people was serious, and the number of fugitives exceeded 200,000 all round the frontier by January 1877.

The rebels in South Bosnia had cleared the region of Muslims, presently under the command of Despotović, between the Austrian frontier and the Ottoman fortresses of Kulen Vakuf, Ključ and Glamoč.

In August 1877, all Bosnian Muslims men from 15 to 70 were ordered to fight, although there was already 54 battalions, each with 400–700 men.

== Aftermath ==
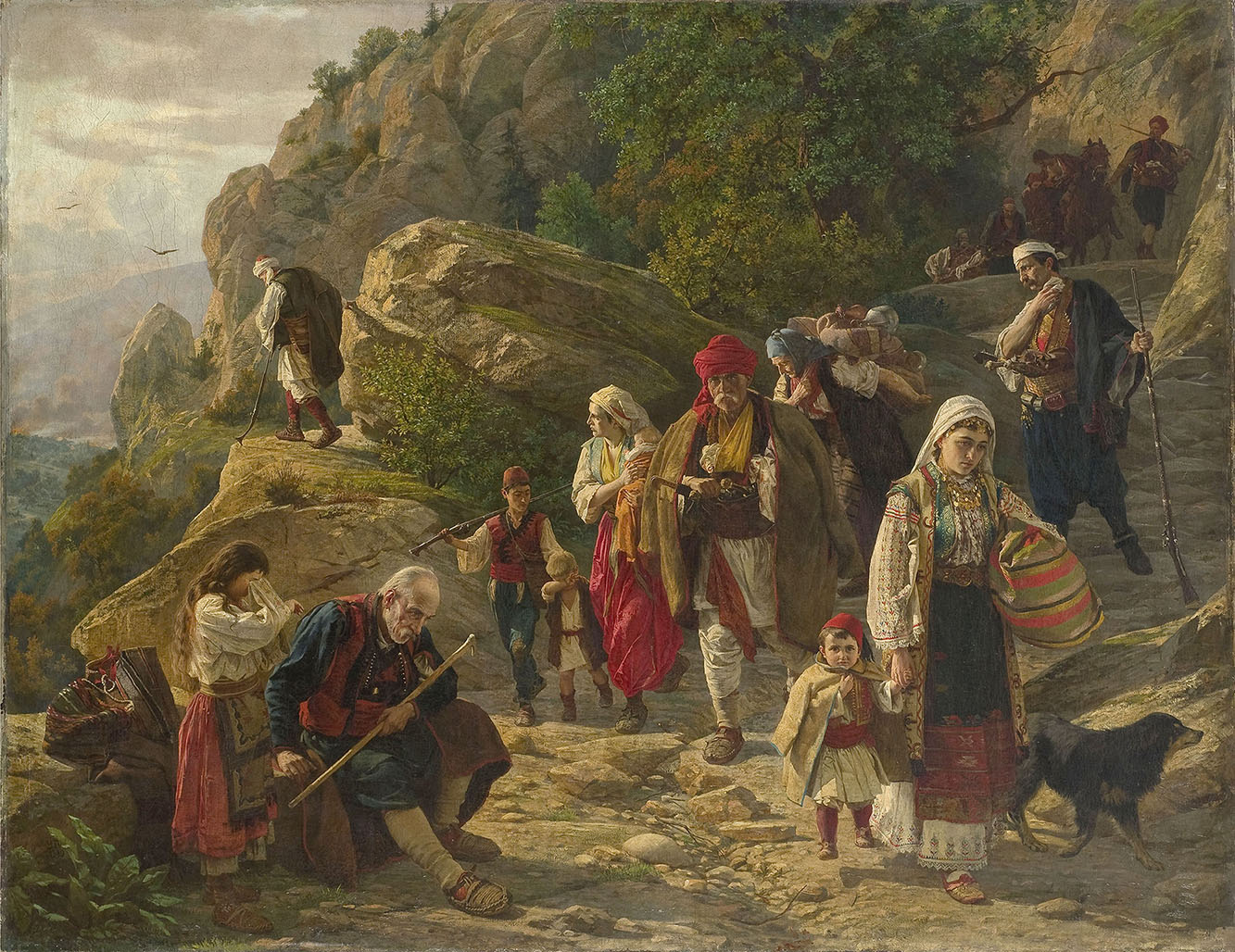
"Refugees from Herzegovina", 1889 painting by Uroš Predić.

The uprising was the starting point of the Great Eastern Crisis, the reopening of the "Eastern Question". The unrest rapidly spread among the Christian populations of the other Ottoman provinces in the Balkans (notably the April Uprising in Bulgaria) setting off what would become known as the Great Eastern Crisis. The Ottoman atrocities in suppressing unrest in the Balkan provinces eventually led to the Russo-Turkish War of 1877–78, which ended in Turkish defeat, and the signing of the Treaty of San Stefano in March 1878, followed in July of the same year by the Treaty of Berlin, severely reducing Ottoman territories and power in Europe. The Congress of Berlin decided that Bosnia and Herzegovina, while remaining nominally under Turkish sovereignty, would be governed by Austria-Hungary. Austria-Hungary annexed Bosnia and Herzegovina in 1908. The occupation and annexation enraged Serbs and was a catalyst for the assassination of Archduke Franz Ferdinand of Austria by the Bosnian Serb nationalist Gavrilo Princip.

== Legacy ==
The Nevesinje municipality has a coat of arms with two rifles, symbolising the revolt. The government of Republika Srpska together with the Nevesinje municipality annually organises the anniversary of the revolt.

In 1963, a Yugoslav film by Žika Mitrović about the Nevesinje rebellion was released, titled in Serbian as Невесињска пушка and in English as Thundering Mountains.

Jovan Bratić (born 1974), a comic artist from Nevesinje, made a cartoon series on the Herzegovina Uprising, titled Nevesinjska puška, the first part released in 2008, and the second part Nevesinjska puška 2: Bitka na Vučjem dolu.

According to historian Edin Radušić: "Milorad Ekmečić gave the main word in interpretations of a wide range of issues related to the uprising in domestic historiography, in the 1960s he from Vaso Čubrilović took over the primacy as the main interpreter of the uprising, and since then he had the greatest influence on other historians who have dealt with this thematic framework". Also, "Ekmečić became more openly politically engaged in recent works, openly linking the motives of the 19th century uprising with the insurgent movements from WWII and violence in Bosnia and Herzegovina from the end of the 20th century, with the thesis of religious war as the appearance of the long duration, which has one of its key episodes in the uprising of 1875–1878".

== See also ==
- Austro-Hungarian campaign in Bosnia and Herzegovina in 1878

== Sources ==
- Bataković, Dušan T. (1996). The Serbs of Bosnia & Herzegovina: History and Politics. Paris: Dialogue. ISBN 978-2911527104.
- Bataković, Dušan T., ed. (2005). Histoire du peuple serbe [History of the Serbian People] (in French). Lausanne: L’Age d’Homme. ISBN 978-2825119587.
- Bogićević, Vojislav (1950). Stanje raje u Bosni i Hercegovini pred ustanak 1875–1878 godine: povodom 75-godišnjice ustanka u Hercegovini i bosanskoj krajini 1875–1878. Državna štamparija u Sarajevu.
- Ćirković, Sima (2004). The Serbs. Malden: Blackwell Publishing. ISBN 978-1405142915.
- Čubrilović, Vasa; Antonić, Zdravko (1996). Bosanski ustanak 1875–1878 [Bosnian Uprising 1875–1878]. Službeni list SRJ. ISBN 978-8635502885.
- Ekmečić, Milorad (1973). Ustanak u Bosni 1875–1878 [Uprising in Bosnia 1875–1878]. Sarajevo: Veselin Masleša.
- Gutić, Vasilije M. (1980). Opšta i diplomatska istorija ustanka u Hercegovini i Bosni iz 1875–1878. godine. V. Gutić.
- Harris, David (1928). Balkan diplomacy, July, 1875 to July, 1876: from the revolt in Herzegovina to the Reichstadt agreement ... Leland Stanford Junior University.
- Jagodić, Miloš (2004). Насељавање Кнежевине Србије : 1861–1880. Istorijski institut. ISBN 978-8677430467.
- Ković, Miloš (2010). "The beginning of the 1875 Serbian uprising in Herzegovina: the British perspective". Balcanica (41): 55–71. doi:10.2298/BALC1041055K. hdl:21.15107/rcub_reff_968.
- Mackenzie, G. M.; Irby, A. P. (2010) [1877]. Travels in the Slavonic Provinces of Turkey-In-Europe (Vols. I and II). New York: Cosimo. ISBN 978-1616404055.
- Milojković-Djurić, Jelena (1994). Panslavism and national identity in Russia and in the Balkans, 1830–1880: images of the self and others. East European Monographs. ISBN 978-0880332910.
- Reid, James J. (2000). Crisis of the Ottoman Empire: Prelude to Collapse 1839–1878. Franz Steiner Verlag. ISBN 978-3515076876.
- Никифоров, Д.И. (2015). Петр Карагеоргиевич в Боснийском восстании 1875–1878 годов.. Новая и новейшая история (in Russian). 2: 183–191.
- Radoičić, Mirko S. (1966). Hercegovina i Crna Gora 1875–1878 (in Serbo-Croatian). Savez udruženja boraca NOR-a, Opštinski odbor.
- Rupp, George Hoover (1941). A Wavering Friendship: Russia and Austria, 1876–1878. Harvard University Press.
- Stojanović, Mihailo D. (1968) [1939]. The Great Powers and the Balkans, 1875–1878. Cambridge University Press.
- Šipovac, T. (1979). Nevesinjska puška.
- Ustanak u Bosni od 1875. do 1878. god: građa za noviju srpsku istoriju rata za oslobođenje. Pajević. 1884.
