= Zdenci =

- Location within Croatia
- Coordinates: 45°35′21.12″N 17°57′01.08″E
- Country: Croatia
- County: Virovitica-Podravina County

Area
  - Total: 84.6 km^{2} (32.7 sq mi)

Population (2021)
  - Total: 1,453
  - Density: 17.2/km^{2} (44.5/sq mi)
- Time zone: UTC+1 (CET)
  - Summer (DST): UTC+2 (CEST)
- Website: opcina-zdenci.hr

Zdenci is a village and municipality in Croatia in the Virovitica–Podravina County.

In the 2011 census, it had a total population of 1,904, in the following settlements:

- Bankovci, population 124
- Donje Predrijevo, population 106
- Duga Međa, population 196
- Grudnjak, population 13
- Kutovi, population 176
- Obradovci, population 56
- Slavonske Bare, population 170
- Zdenci, population 930
- Zokov Gaj, population 133

In the 2001 census, 88% of the population were Croats.

== Politics ==
=== Minority councils ===
Directly elected minority councils and representatives are tasked with consulting tasks for the local or regional authorities in which they are advocating for minority rights and interests, integration into public life and participation in the management of local affairs. At the 2023 Croatian national minorities councils and representatives elections Serbs of Croatia fulfilled legal requirements to elect 10 members minority councils of the Municipality of Zdenci.

== Notable natives and residents ==
- Jovo Stanisavljević Čaruga
