= Pecija =

Petar Popović Pecija
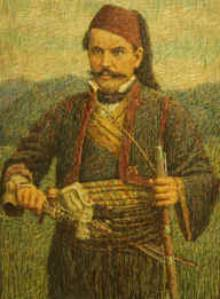
- Portrait
- Nickname: Pecija (Пеција)
- Born: Petar Popović (Петар Поповић); 1826; Gornji Bušević, Bosnia Eyalet, Ottoman Empire
- Died: 29 August 1875 (aged 49) Jasenovac region, Slavonian Military Frontier, Austria-Hungary
- Buried: Moštanica monastery
- Service years: 1848–78
- Rank: vojvoda (commander)
- Memorials: outside Moštanica

Petar Popović (Serbian Cyrillic: Петар Поповић; 1826 – 29 August 1875), known as Pecija (Пеција), was a Serb hajduk (brigand) and rebel leader in two uprisings against the Ottoman Empire in the Bosanska Krajina region, one in 1858, and one in 1875.

== Life ==
=== Early life ===
Petar Popović was born into a Serbian Orthodox family in the village of Gornji Bušević, in Krupa na Uni (modern-day Bosnia and Herzegovina), in 1826. His father's name was Petar and his mother was Ilinka. He spent the greater part of his life in Bosanska Kostajnica. He was an autodidact, apart from Serbian he also spoke Turkish. As an opponent to the Ottoman state, Petar, at only 22 years of age in 1848, joined the hajduks and actively, for the rest of his life, fought the Ottomans.

=== Pecija's First Revolt ===
In mid-1858, an uprising broke out in northwestern Bosnia, resulting from Ottoman pressure against the local Serb populace. In Ivanjska in the Krupa nahiyah, the Serb population of that Catholic-majority village rose up. After short shootings around Ivanjska, the other villages took up arms. It is said that it originated in zulum (tyranny) from the Ottomans. In June 1858, the uprising expanded on to Knešpolje. The leaders were former hajduk (bandit) Petar Popović–Pecija, Petar Garača (d. 1858), Simo Ćosić and Risto Jeić. The rural population of Knešpolje was predominantly consisting of Serbian Orthodox people, while the Muslim population predominantly lived in the cities. On June 20, the rebels pushed the Muslims into the city of Novi. Around 600 rebels summoned outside Novi, planning to attack the city. At the same time, Pecija and Garača had summoned around 3,000 rebels, which entered Ivanjska in order to help the local rebels. On July 4, in the battle of Doljani near Bihać, some 100 Turks fell, after which Jeić crossed into Austria, trying to convince the Austrians that these peasants with pitchforks and scythes were worth more than to live off bread. On July 15, the foothold at Ivanjska fell, where Pecija and Garača were. The rebel bands near Ivanjska were heavily defeated, with Pecija and Garača leading the survived rebels into Knešpolje, from where they gave their final resistance.

At this time the Ottoman troops were strengthened with aiding detachments which were sent from all regions of Bosnia, and on July 21, the battle on Tavija near modern Kostajnica took place. Around 1,000 rebels defended their trenches, but they could not resist, and most of them decided to flee to Austria after the defeat. The next day, a battle was fought near the village of Kuljan. Pecija and Garača, weakened from the leaving of a larger number of rebels for the other side of the Una river (Austrian territory), did not have the strength to give serious resistance to the well-organized Ottoman army, so they decided to also flee to Austria. However the Austrians denied them protection, and sought to disarm them and hand over them to the Ottoman government; Pecija and Garača decided to not surrender, and with some 300 rebels they broke the Ottoman blockade and fled up into the Prosar mountain.

The next months, Pecija and Garača continued to fight a guerilla war over Knešpolje, however, the large-scale uprising had been crushed. In December, Garača was killed near Kostajnica. After Garača's death, Pecija decided to retreat into Austria, however, the Austrian government caught him in surprise and delivered him to the Ottomans for a prize of 5,000 groschen. Pecija was taken to Constantinople to stand trial. There he was sentenced to death, for, according to the charges, killing 98 Turks. The death sentence was to be carried out in the Bosnia Eyalet, in his hometown. During the trip, leaving Constantinople, Pecija managed to escape near Užice, and moved to the Principality of Serbia.

=== Stay at Kragujevac and Belgrade ===
He escaped to Serbia, of which period there is little information. According to Archimandrite S. Vujasinović he was welcomed by Prince Mihailo, who appointed him guard in Kragujevac; according to D. Aleksić he worked in the Kragujevac foundry; according to M. Ekmečić he was a pandur (guard) in the Kragujevac foundry. He stayed in Serbia until the uprising broke out in the Bosnia Vilayet in 1875.

=== Bosanska Krajina Uprising ===
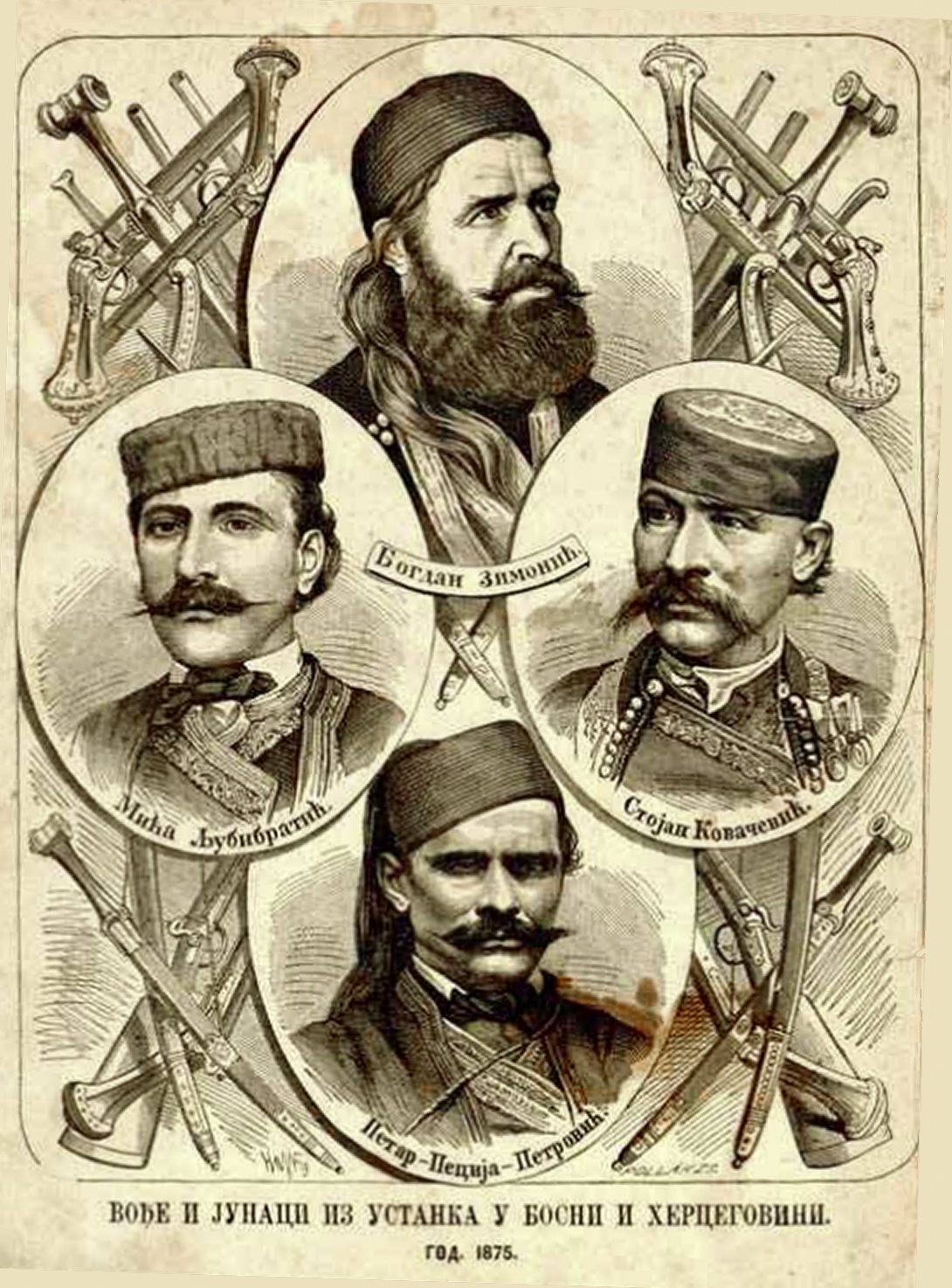
Leaders and Heroes of the Uprising in Bosnia and Herzegovina, illustration in the Serb calendar Orao (1876). Pecija is depicted in the lower side.

He immediately joined the uprising in Bosanska Krajina (1875), and fought in Gašnica on 28 August. Pecija once again proved to be one of the most capable leaders as he forced the Ottomans into flight. However, shortly afterwards, according to folk telling due to treason by Ilija Čolanović, the Ottomans surprised the rebels and after a lengthy and violent fight destroyed the hajduk band, with some fleeing to Prosar, and only some 50 remaining with Pecija to continue the fight on the Sava banks.

Pecija and his rebels managed to seize a boat and cross the river, but without protection, most of the men died from Ottoman gunfire. Only Pecija and two men remained alive, and Pecija, restless and courageous as he was, instead of escaping, went out in the open and shouted "Hey, Turks, just to let you know, you did not kill Pecija, he is still alive, and he will soon avenge you." A bullet struck him in the head and he died instantly, on the night of 29 August 1875. Pecija, together with Kormanoš and the other men were buried in the village of Jablanac, under Jasenovac. A decade after his death, Pecija's remains were relocated and properly stored in the Moštanica monastery, at the foot of Kozara near Kozarska Dubica.

== Legacy ==
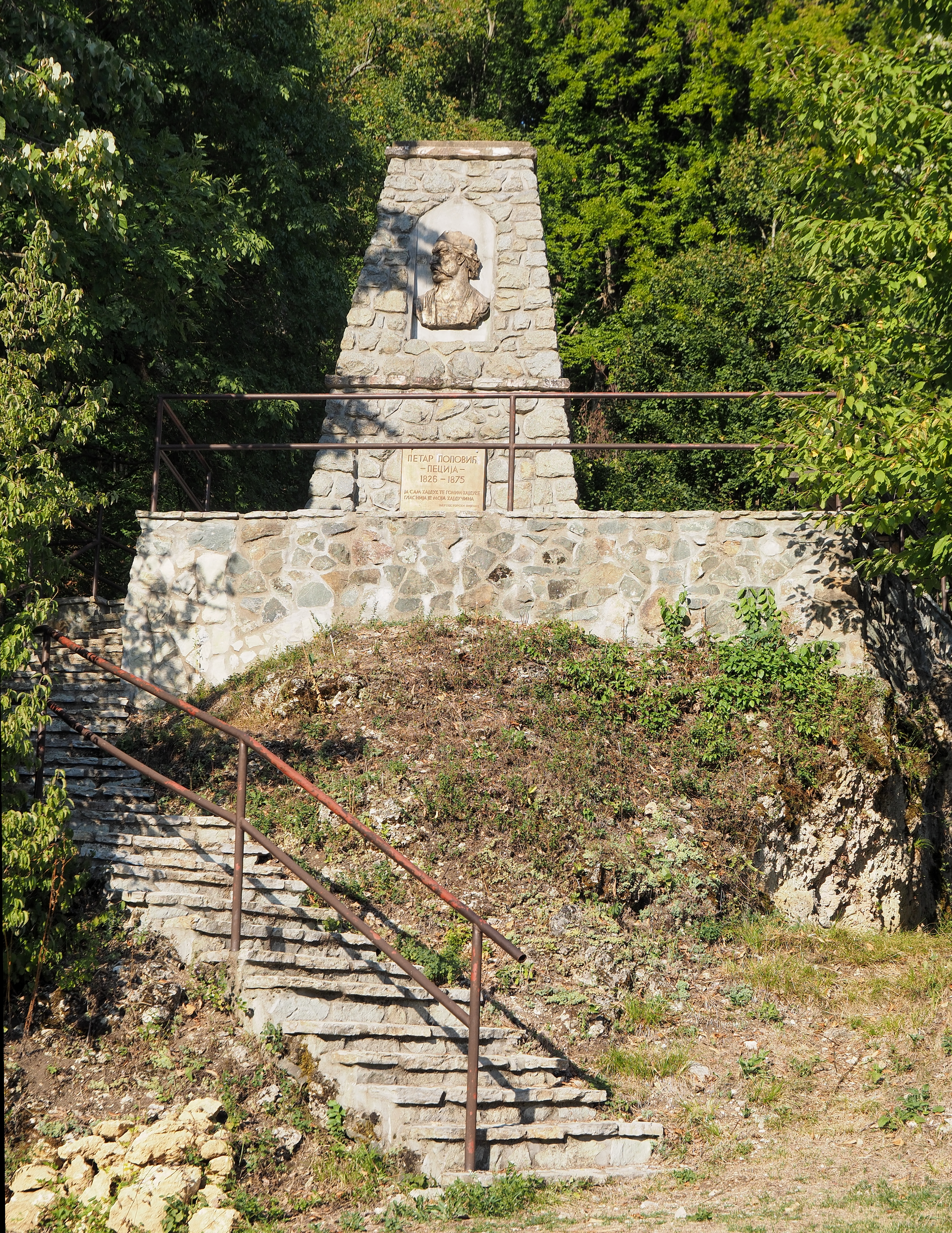
Monument outside the Monastery Moštanica, the burial ground of Hajduk Pecija.

After the death of Pecija, he was buried on the Austrian side of the Sava, near Jasenovac. The Serbs were not allowed to move his remains to Bosnia. Serbs from Kozarska Dubica, among whom were Ostoja Kosanović, Jovo Subanović, Dimitrije Misaljević, started the initiative for the relocation of Pecija's remains to Bosnia in 1901, for a burial with dignity. They, with a priest from Mlaka, agreed upon to secretly dig up the remains and transfer them to Kozarska Dubica, where Pecija's remains were stored on the attic of Jovan Jajčanin. When the Austrians learned of this, Jajčanin and the others transferred his remains to the Moštanica monastery, where he was buried. Archimandrite Kiril Hadžić of Moštanica granted rights for his burial in the monastery (1885–86). In 1910, at the reguest of the Serbian people, hegumen Ivančić blessed his grave. In 1933 a memorial dedicated to Pecija was erected, placed outside Moštanica.

== See also ==
- Stevan Šupljikac, voivode in Austrian service, the first Duke of Serbian Vojvodina (1848)
