= Gornji Bušević, Krupa na Uni =

Gornji Bušević Горњи Бушевић
- Village
- Location within Bosnia and Herzegovina
- Coordinates: 44.902903°N 16.254705°E
- Country: Bosnia and Herzegovina
- Entity: Republika Srpska
- Municipality: Krupa na Uni

Area
  - Total: 4.25 sq mi (11.00 km^{2})

Population (2013)
  - Total: 202
- Time zone: UTC+1 (CET)
  - Summer (DST): UTC+2 (CEST)

Gornji Bušević (Serbian Cyrillic: Горњи Бушевић) is a village in Krupa na Uni, Republika Srpska, Bosnia and Herzegovina.

Before the Bosnian War, the entire town of Gornji Bušević was part of the Bosanska Krupa municipality, but after the Dayton Peace Agreement one part of the inhabited area became a part of municipality Krupa na Uni, divided by the Inter-Entity Boundary Line.

== Demographics ==
According to the 2013 census, its population was 202.

Ethnicity in 2013
Ethnicity	Number	Percentage
Serbs	201	99.5%
Bosniaks	1	0.5%
Total	202	100%
