= Mićo Ljubibratić =

Serbian vojvoda (1839–1889)

Mihajlo Mićo Ljubibratić Михајло Мићо Љубибратић
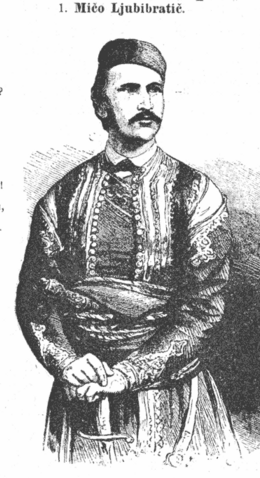
- Portrait from Humoristické listy, 2 October 1875, issue 40.
- Nickname: Mićo
- Born: 1839 Ljubovo, Ottoman Empire
- Died: 26 February 1889 (aged 49–50) Belgrade, Kingdom of Serbia
- Allegiance: Serbia
- Branch: Revolutionaries
- Rank: Vojvoda

Mihajlo "Mićo" Ljubibratić (Serbian Cyrillic: Мићо Љубибратић; 1839 – 26 February 1889) was a Serbian vojvoda (military commander), Orthodox priest, writer and translator who participated in the many uprisings in the Herzegovina region. He was the first person in the Balkans to translate the Quran into Serbian. Greek, Bulgarian, Romanian and Albanian translations would follow in the 20th century.

== Life ==
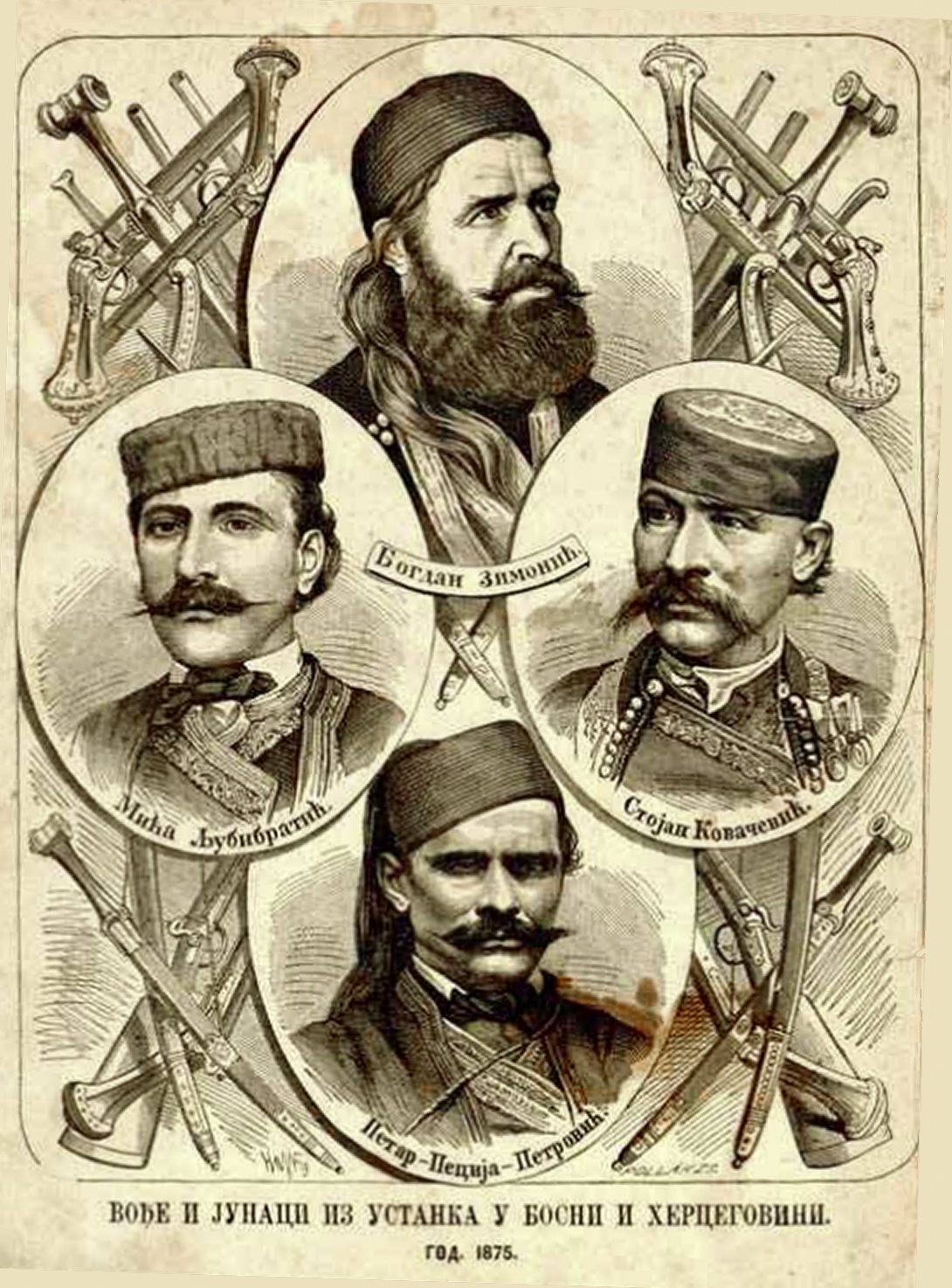
Leaders and Heroes of the Uprising in Bosnia and Herzegovina, illustration in the Serb calendar Orao (1876). Ljubibratić to the left.

Mihajlo Ljubibratić was born in Ljubovo, Trebinje (modern Bosnia and Herzegovina). He joined Luka Vukalović in the Herzegovinian Uprising (1857–1862). He supported Garibaldi in the Italian revolution. After the fall of the uprising in 1862, he went to Serbia where he continued to organize the liberation of the Balkan peoples and also sought to recruit Slavic Muslims for the cause. In the Herzegovina Uprising (1875-1878), the Serbian government, which could not publicly assist due to international pressure, secretly sent Ljubibratić and others to lead the uprising. In March 1876, he fought in Bosnia, but was captured and interrogated by the Austrians. In March 1877, he returned to Serbia, and upon the Herzegovina-Boka Uprising (1882), he devoted himself to establish an administrative body and the cooperation of Serbs and Muslims (i.e. Bosniaks) against the Austro-Hungarians.

== See also ==
- Stevan Šupljikac, voivode in Austrian service, the first Duke of Serbian Vojvodina (1848)
