= Siljevica =

Village in Serbia

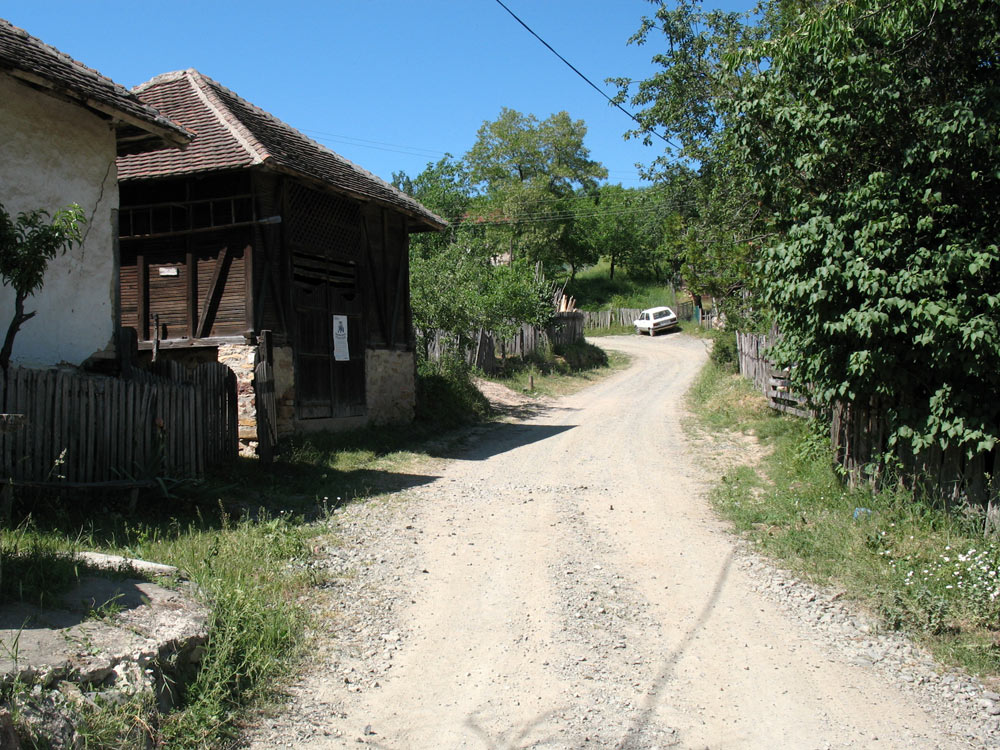

Siljevica (Serbian Cyrillic: Сиљевица) is a village in Šumadija and Western Serbia (Šumadija), in the municipality of Rekovac (Region of Levač), lying at 43°50′55″N 21°02′02″E, at the elevation of 470 m. According to the 2002 census, the village had 165 citizens.
