= Jovo Stanisavljević Čaruga =

Serbian outlaw

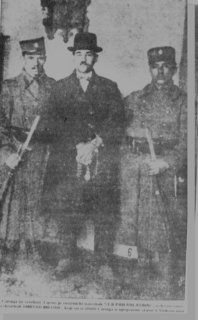
Jovo Stanisavljević Čaruga

Jovan "Jovo" Stanisavljević (Serbian Cyrillic: Јовaн "Јово" Станисављевић; 1897–27 February 1925), known by his nickname Čaruga (Чаруга), was a Serbian outlaw (hajduk) in Slavonia in the early 20th century.

== Early life ==
Stanisavljević was born in 1897, into a Serb Orthodox family in the village of Slavonske Bare (part of Zdenci) in the Virovitica County, autonomous Kingdom of Croatia-Slavonia, Austro-Hungary. He was named after his paternal grandfather Jovan, who went by the family nickname of Čaruga ("troublemaker"). His father Prokopija was a peasant, and his mother Ika died when he was ten. His father remarried, and he had a tough upbringing, later running away from home to Osijek, where he went to a locksmith school.

== Criminal career ==
When World War I broke out, he stopped his studies and enrolled in the Austro-Hungarian Army. However, he posed as an officer and deserted the front lines. Shortly afterwards, he killed a man who was courting his girlfriend, and after a local nobleman threatened to arrest him, he killed him too. He was eventually apprehended, tried, and convicted, and started serving his sentence in the Sremska Mitrovica penitentiary. He managed to escape from prison and had a warrant for his capture, returning home where he was unwelcome. Čaruga left for the woods, where he befriended a gang, Kolo gorskih tića ("Band of Mountain Birds"), composed mostly of deserters, who all detested the rich Slavonian peasants and robbed them mercilessly, and were not afraid of killing people. He used the false names Nikola Drezgić and Mile Barić. The war was long over, but Čaruga and the gang were still pillaging the countryside, and became hunted by the Yugoslav gendarmerie. Eventually, in 1922, he decided to leave for Zagreb, where he posed as a rich gentleman from Vinkovci and also continued his life of thievery. He would later return to Slavonia to continue stealing together with his group members. On 14 October 1923, however, they attempted to rob the Eltz family estate in Ivankovo near Vinkovci. They killed a man on site, while another snuck out and called the gendarmerie. After the skirmish that ensued they managed to escape but without their loot. More importantly, the police got on their trail and soon captured them. By February 1925, Čaruga's trial at the court in Osijek was finished, and he was subsequently hanged in front of a crowd of 3,000.

Čaruga's demise attracted a lot of popular attention at the time, and numerous popular books. In 1991 the movie Čaruga was directed by Rajko Grlić. He remains a well-known historic figure in the Balkans.

== Sources ==
- Marino Zurl (1972). Knjiga o Jovi Čarugi i Joci Udmaniću. August Cesarec.
- Dragan Jovašević (1984). Čaruga. Dečje novine.
- Čaruga. Beogradski izdavačko-grafički zavod. 1982.
