= Pecija's First Revolt =

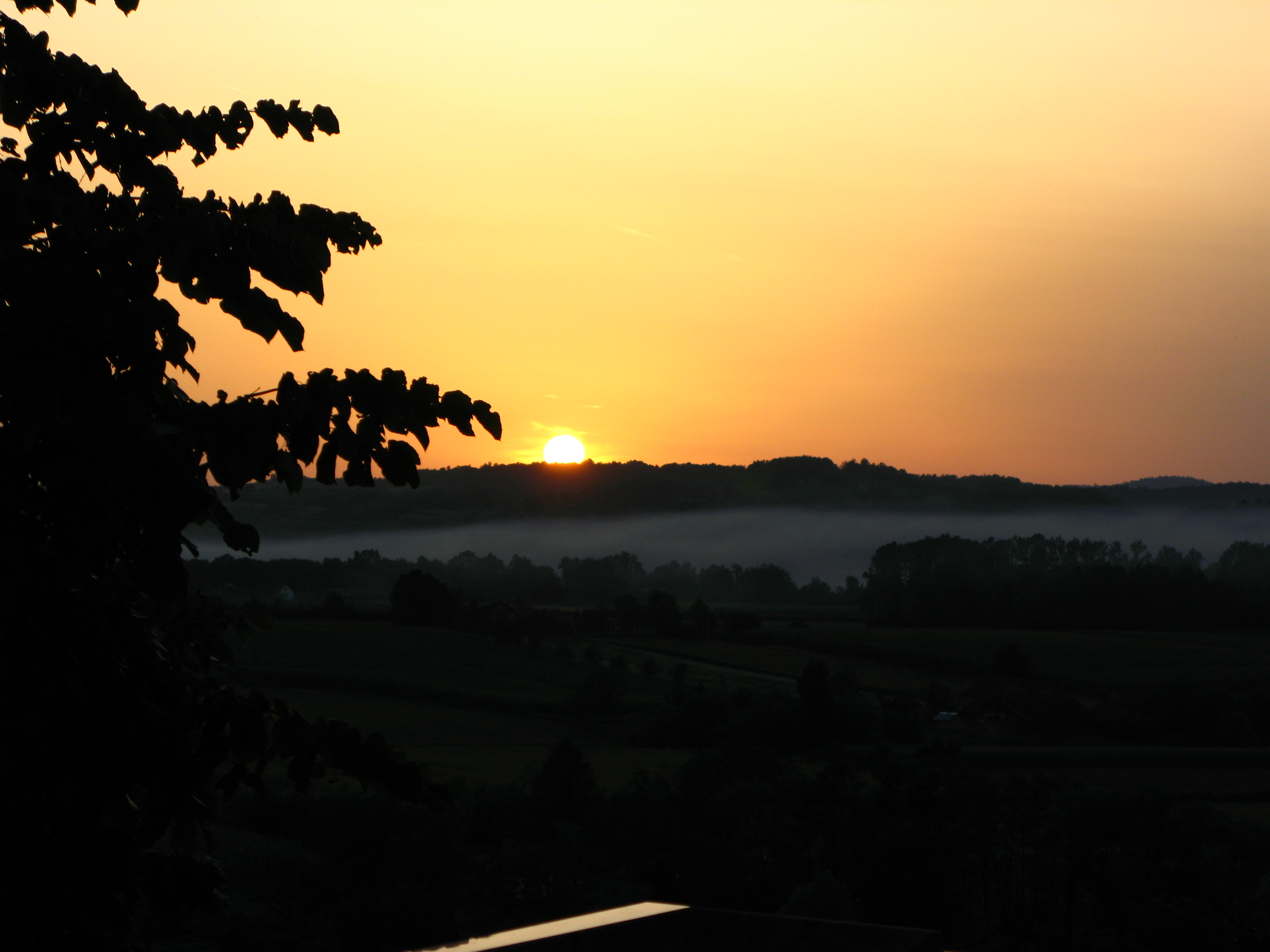
- Sunset in Knešpolje, where the revolt took place
Date	June–December 1858
Location	"Bosanska Krajina", Ottoman Bosnia Eyalet
Result	Ottoman victory

Belligerents
Local Serb peasants	Ottoman Empire

Commanders and leaders
Petar Popović–Pecija (POW); Petar Garača †; Dmitar Vručinić; Simo Ćosić; Risto Jeić	Unknown

Strength
3,600 (June 20); 1,000 (July 21); 300 (August)	

Casualties and losses
Heavy	Unknown total, at least 100 (Doljani, July 4)

Pecija's First Revolt (Serbian Cyrillic: прва Пецијина буна) or Doljani Revolt (Дољанска буна) was an uprising in Knešpolje led by Serb hajduk leader Petar Popović–Pecija (1826–1875) against the Ottoman government, that extended over the period of June—December 1858. It was a result of pressure against the local Serb populace, with past atrocities conducted by the Ottomans.

== Background ==
In 1857, an uprising was led by Luka Vukalović in Herzegovina, followed by the 1858 Uprising which included the Prota's Revolt in Gradačac srez (municipality), led by prota Avramović, and at the same time Pecija's Revolt in Krajina.

== Revolt ==
In mid-1858, an uprising broke out in northwestern Bosnia, resulting from Ottoman pressure against the local Serb populace. In Ivanjska in the Krupa nahiyah, the Serb population of that Catholic-majority village rose up. After short shootings around Ivanjska, the other villages took up arms. It is said that it originated in zulum (tyranny) from the Ottomans. In June 1858, the uprising expanded on to Knešpolje. The leaders were former hajduk (bandit) Petar Popović–Pecija (1826–1875), Petar Garača (d. 1858), Simo Ćosić and Risto Jeić. The rural population of Knešpolje was predominantly consisting of Serbian Orthodox people, while the Muslim population predominantly lived in the cities. On June 20, the rebels pushed the Muslims into the city of Novi. Around 600 rebels summoned outside Novi, planning to attack the city. At the same time, Pecija and Garača had summoned around 3,000 rebels, which entered Ivanjska in order to help the local rebels. On July 4, in the battle of Doljani near Bihać, some 100 Turks fell, after which Jeić crossed into Austria, trying to convince the Austrians that these peasants with pitchforks and scythes were worth more than to live off bread. On July 15, the foothold at Ivanjska fell, where Pecija and Garača were. The rebel bands near Ivanjska were heavily defeated, with Pecija and Garača leading the survived rebels into Knešpolje, from where they gave their final resistance.

At this time the Ottoman troops were strengthened with aiding detachments which were sent from all regions of Bosnia, and on July 21, the battle on Tavija near modern Kostajnica took place. Around 1,000 rebels defended their trenches, but they could not resist, and most of them decided to flee to Austria after the defeat. The next day, a battle was fought near the village of Kuljan. Pecija and Garača, weakened from the leaving of a larger number of rebels for the other side of the Una river (Austrian territory), did not have the strength to give serious resistance to the well-organized Ottoman army, so they decided to also flee to Austria. However the Austrians denied them protection, and sought to disarm them and hand over them to the Ottoman government; Pecija and Garača decided to not surrender, and with some 300 rebels they broke the Ottoman blockade and fled up into the Prosar mountain.

The next months, Pecija and Garača continued to fight a guerilla war over Knešpolje, however, the large-scale uprising had been crushed. In December, Garača was killed near Kostajnica. After Garača's death, Pecija decided to retreat into Austria, however, the Austrian government caught him in surprise and delivered him to the Ottomans for a prize of 5,000 groschen. Pecija was taken to Constantinople to stand trial. There he was sentenced to death, for, according to the charges, killing 98 Turks. The death sentence was to be carried out in the Bosnia Eyalet, in his hometown. During the trip, leaving Constantinople, Pecija managed to escape near Užice, and moved to the Principality of Serbia.

== See also ==
- Herzegovina Uprising (1852–62)
- Milić's Revolt (Милићева буна)
- Sime's Revolt (Буна господина Симе)

== Annotations ==
- It is known as Pecija's First Revolt (прва Пецијина буна). In the Kostajnica region it is known as Pecija's Revolt (Пецијина буна), while around Bihać it is known as Doljani Revolt, after the battle at Doljani, Bihać. It is also known as Pecija's peasant revolt (Пецијина сељачка буна); Kostajnica Revolt; and First Knešpolje Revolt (прва кнешпољска буна)
