= Hajduk =

16th–19th-century peasant irregular infantry

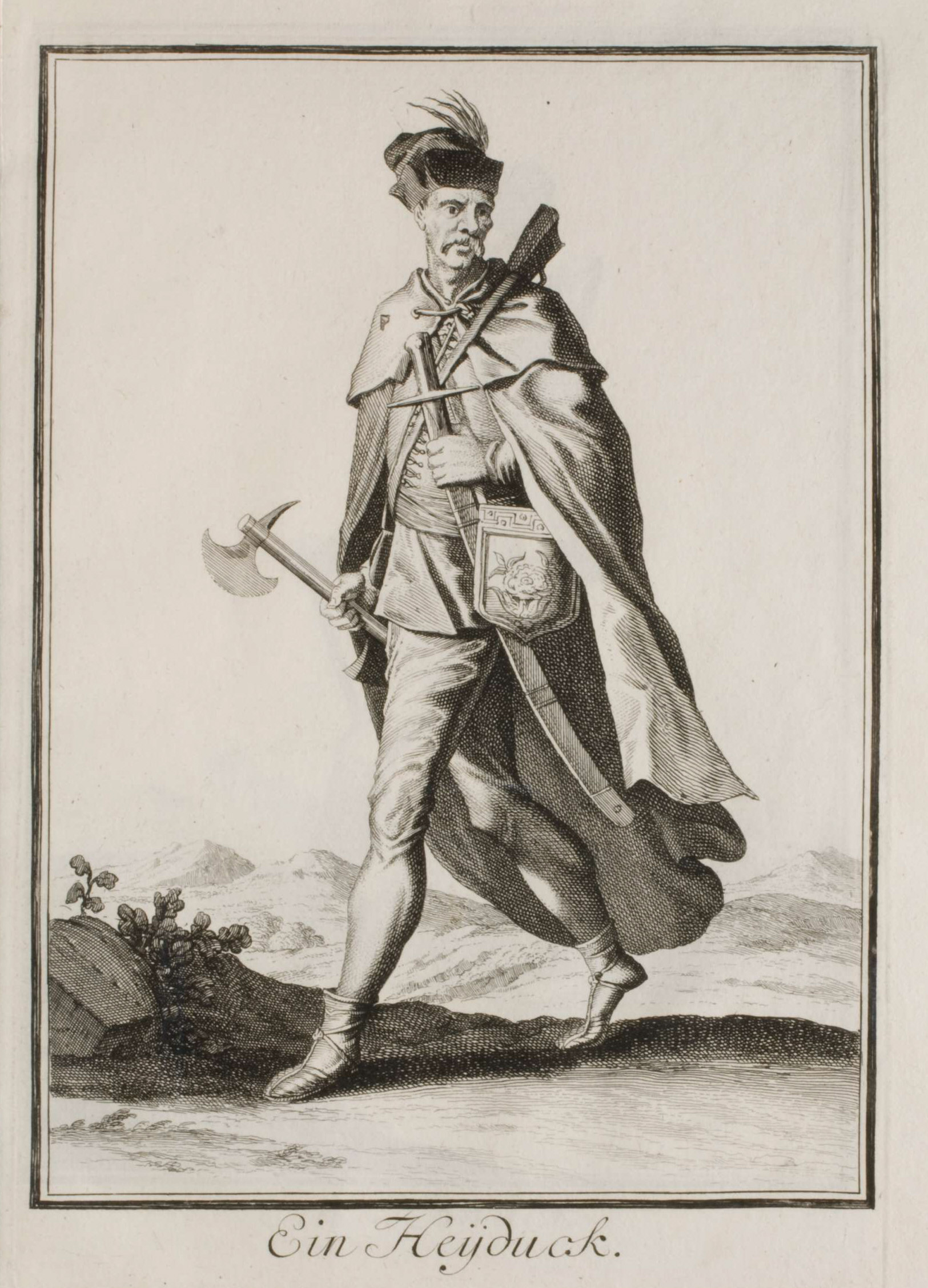
Illustration of a Hungarian Hajduk, from an 1703 book from Bavaria.

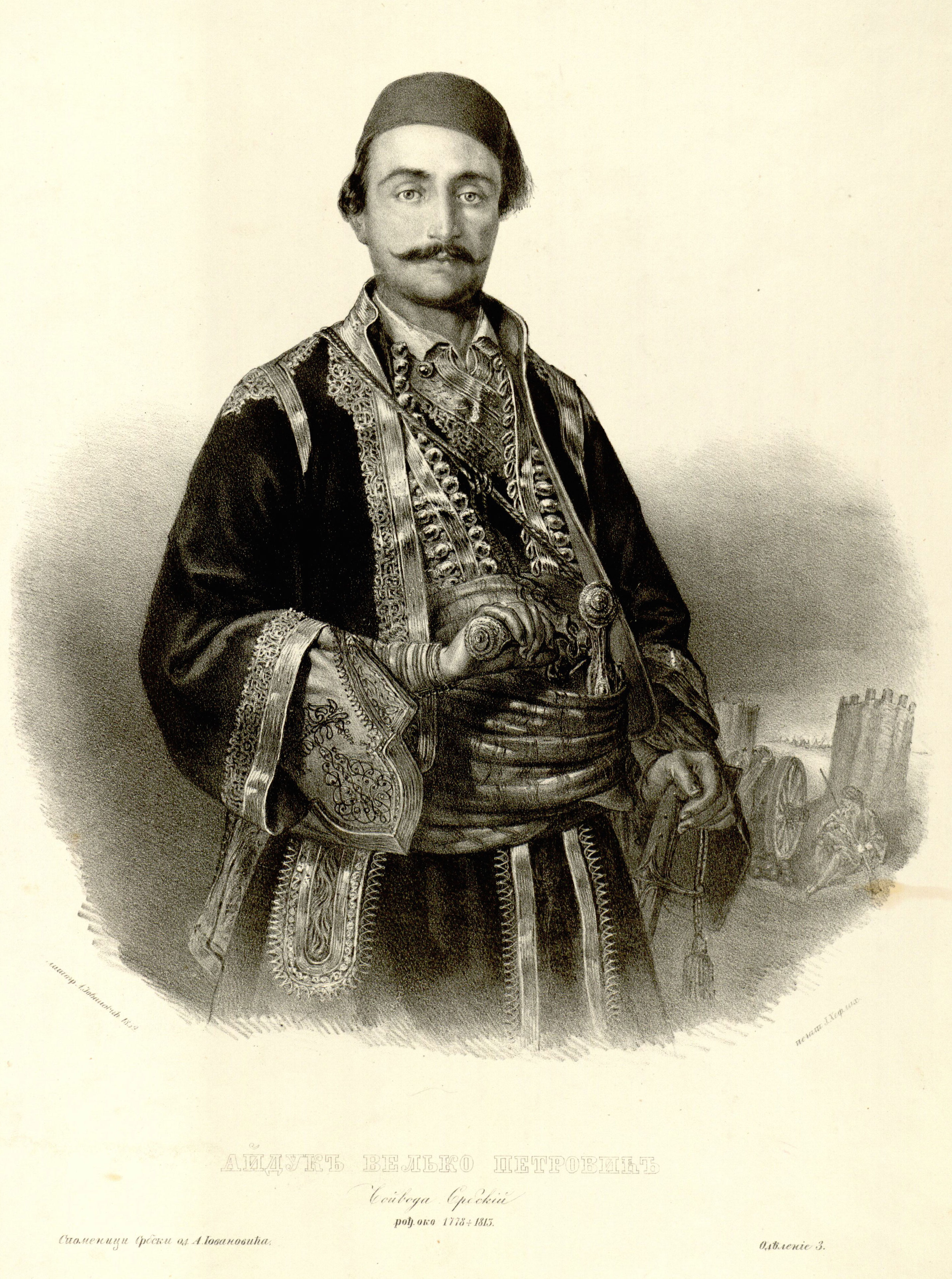
Portrait of Hajduk Veljko, a prominent Serbian hero fighting against Ottoman occupation during the first half of the 19th century.

A hajduk (Hungarian: hajdúk, plural of hajdú) was initially a type of irregular infantry found in Central, Eastern, and parts of Southeast Europe from the late 16th to mid 19th centuries. Eventually the term was used for armed outlaws. The two categories share a reputation ranging from bandits to freedom fighters, depending on time, place, and their enemies.

In the European lands of the Ottoman Empire, the term hajduk was used to describe bandits and brigands of the Balkans, while in Central Europe for the West Slavs, Hungarians, and Germans, and Eastern Europe for the Ukrainians, it was used to refer to outlaws who protected Christians against provocative actions by the Ottomans.

By the 17th century they were firmly established in the Ottoman Balkans, owing to increased taxes, Christian victories against the Ottomans, and a general decline in security. Hajduk bands typically consisted of ten to thirty men, exceptionally up to one hundred, with a clear hierarchy under a single leader. They targeted Ottoman representatives and rich people, mainly rich Turks, for plunder, punishment of oppressive Ottomans, revenge, or a combination of all.

In Balkan folkloric tradition, the hajduk is a romanticised hero figure who steals from, and leads his fighters into battle against, the Ottoman authorities.

People that helped hajduks were called jataks. Jataks lived in villages and towns and provided food and shelter for hajduks. In return, hajduks would give them part of the loot.

The hajduk of the 17th, 18th and 19th centuries commonly were as much guerrilla fighters against the Ottoman rule as they were bandits and highwaymen who preyed not only on Ottomans and their local representatives, but also on local merchants and travellers. As such, the term could also refer to any robber and carry a negative connotation.

== Etymology ==
The etymology of the word hajduk is unclear. One theory is that hajduk was derived from the Turkish word haidut or haydut 'bandit', which was originally used by the Ottomans to refer to Hungarian and Polish–Lithuanian Commonwealth infantry soldiers. Another theory suggests that the word comes from Hungarian hajtó or hajdó (plural hajtók or hajdók) '(cattle) drover'. These two theories do not necessarily contradict each other because the Turkish word haidut or haydut is adapted from the Hungarian hajtó or hajdó.

Other spellings in English include: ajduk, haydut, haiduk, haiduc, hayduck and hayduk.

Forms of the word in various languages

Forms of the word in various languages, in singular form, include:

- hajdut, in Albanian; in the ordinary sense of "thief"
- hayduk (հայդուկ), in Armenian; used as a male given name, and it means "Armenian freedom fighter".
- haydut (хайдут), haydutin (хайдутин) or hayduk (хайдук), in Bulgarian
- haïdouk, haïduque, in French
- aiducco, in Italian
- hajdú, in Hungarian
- ajduk (ајдук), ajdutin (ајдутин), in Macedonian
- hajduk, in Polish
- Hajduk, in Romani
- haiduc, in Romanian
- hajduk (хајдук), in Serbo-Croatian
- hajduk (less common: hejduk), in Czech
- hajdúch in Slovak
- hejduk, in Swedish
- haydut, in Turkish; in the ordinary sense of "bandit"
- hejduk, in Kurdish
- gajduk (гайдук), in Russian
- haidamaka (гайдамака), in Ukrainian
- haydamak (הײַדאַמאַק), in Yiddish
- haiduk, in Palatine

== Irregular military ==
=== Kingdom of Hungary ===
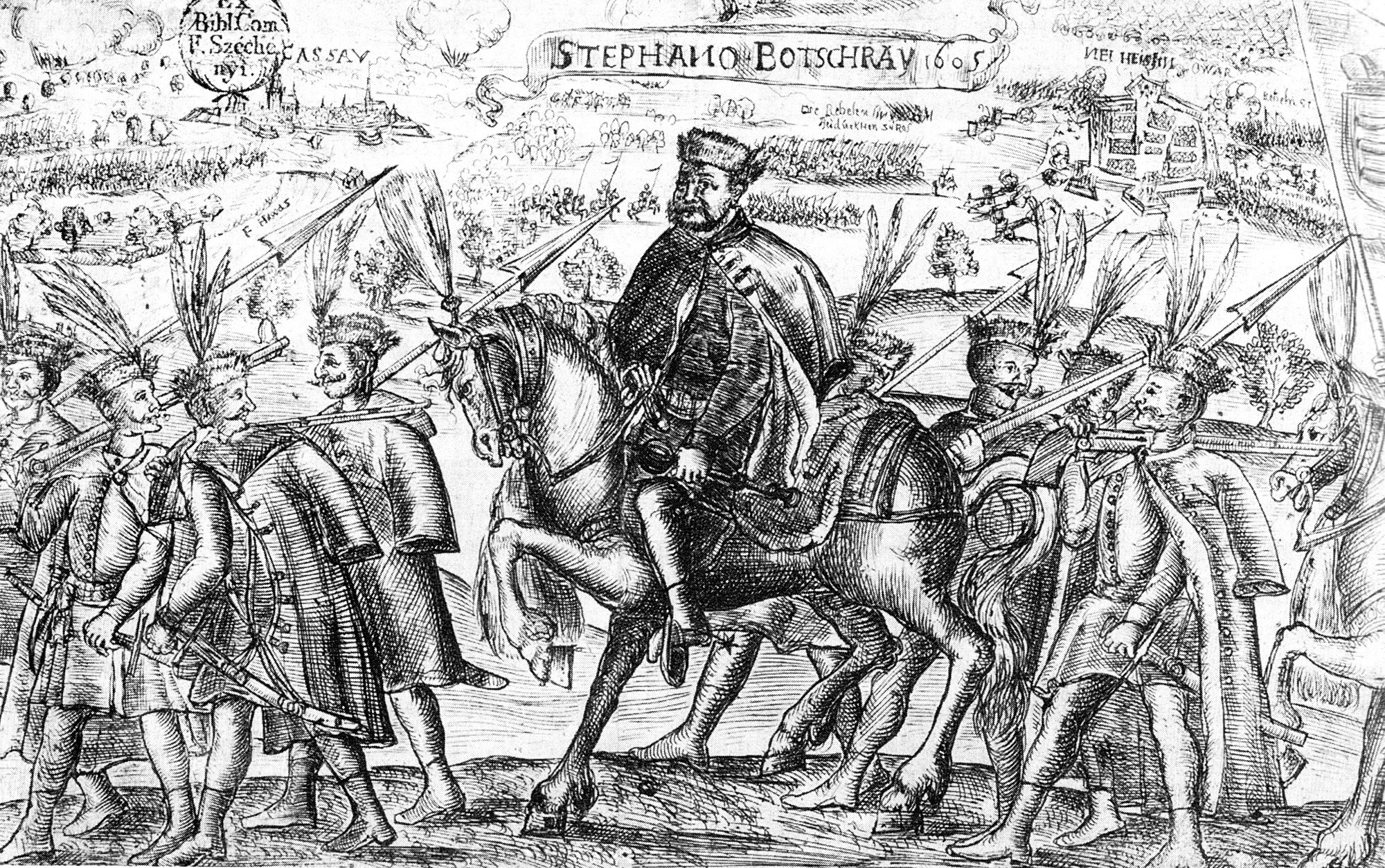
István Bocskay and his hajduk warriors

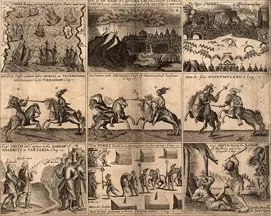
Captain John Smith adventures against the Turks Top raising the siege of Oberlimbach; Middle three duels with Hajdus; Bottom granted a coat of Arms; captured by the Turks and escaping slavery

In 1604-1606, István Bocskay, Lord of Bihar, led an insurrection against the Habsburg Emperor, whose army had recently occupied Transylvania and begun a reign of terror. The bulk of Bocskay's army was composed of serfs who had either fled from the war and the Habsburg drive toward Catholic conversion, or been discharged from the Imperial Army. These peasants, freelance soldiers, were known as the hajduks. As a reward for their service, Bocskay emancipated the hajduk from the jurisdiction of their lords, granted them land, and guaranteed them rights to own property and to personal freedom. The emancipated hajduk constituted a new "warrior estate" within Hungarian feudal society. Many of the settlements created at this time still bear the prefix Hajdú such as Hajdúbagos, Hajdúböszörmény, Hajdúdorog, Hajdúhadház, Hajdúnánás, Hajdúsámson, Hajdúszoboszló, Hajdúszovát, Hajdúvid etc., and the whole area is called Hajdúság (Land of the Hajduk) (see Hajdú County).

The Hajdú have always been an important pillar of Hungarian society and its defence. During the great Turkish attack of 1551/52, it was possible to recruit several hundred or even several thousand Hajdú troops from the Nyírség-Debrecen region for an action against the Turks. Among the Hungarians, the Hajdú lifestyle was significant. At the turn of the 16th and 17th centuries, we know of tens of thousands of hajdú, who were also the first to fight in wars in the first half of the 17th century. Their activities were significant both as mercenaries and as Defence Forces. Hajdú life provided social mobility, as their success was illustrated by the fact that, although they were born as peasant or petty nobles, they often received substantial land donations from the ruler and became quasi-nobility.

=== Polish–Lithuanian Commonwealth ===
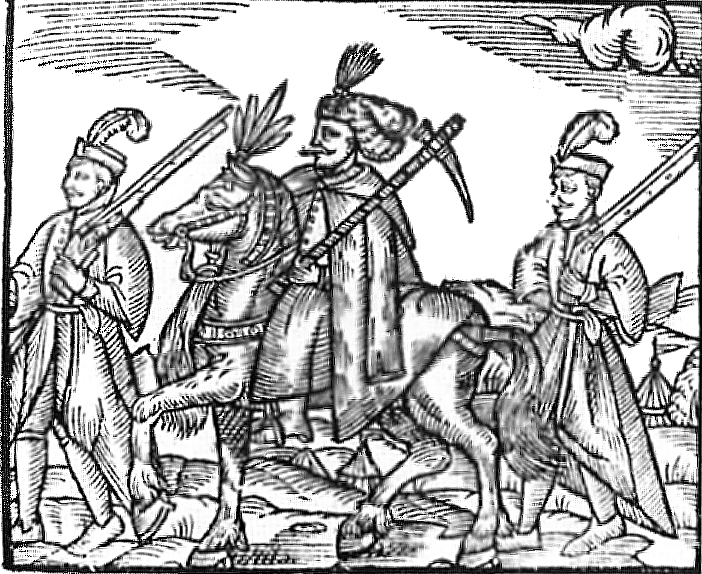
Polish nobleman and two hajduk guards.

The word hajduk was initially a colloquial term for a style of footsoldier, Hungarian or Turco-Balkan in inspiration, that formed the backbone of the Polish infantry arm from the 1570s until about the 1630s. Unusually for this period, Polish-Lithuanian hajduks wore uniforms, typically of grey-blue woolen cloth, with red collar and cuffs. Their principal weapon was a small calibre matchlock firearm, known as an arquebus. For close combat they also carried a heavy variety of sabre, capable of hacking off the heads of enemy pikes and polearms. Contrary to popular opinion, the small axe they often wore tucked in their belt (not to be confused with the huge half-moon shaped berdysz axe, which was seldom carried by hajduks) was not a combat weapon, but rather was intended for cutting wood.

In the mid-17th century hajduk-style infantry largely fell out of fashion in Poland-Lithuania, and were replaced by musket-armed infantry of Western style. However, commanders or hetmans of the Polish–Lithuanian Commonwealth continued to maintain their own liveried bodyguards of hajduks, well into the 18th century as something of a throwback to the past, even though they were now rarely used as field troops. In imitation of these bodyguards, in the 18th century wealthy members of the szlachta hired liveried domestic servants whom they called hajduks, thereby creating the meaning of the term 'hajduk' as it is generally understood in modern Polish.

=== Serbian Militia (1718–46) ===
The Serbs established a Hajduk army that supported the Austrians. The army was divided into 18 companies, in four groups. In this period, the most notable obor-kapetans were Vuk Isaković from Crna Bara, Mlatišuma from Kragujevac and Kosta Dimitrijević from Paraćin.

== Cultural influence ==
The Croatian football team HNK Hajduk Split; Serbian football teams Hajduk Kula, FK Hajduk Beograd, FK Hajduk Veljko and Hajduk Lion; the Macedonian football team FK Hajduk - Vratnica; Czech amateur football team Hajduk Lipník; the pop-music project Haiducii, and Romanian Roma musical troupe Taraful Haiducilor are all named after the hajduci. The surnames of the fictional character George Washington Hayduke, invented by Edward Abbey, actress Stacy Haiduk, US national soccer team defender Frankie Hejduk, Czech Republic national ice hockey team forward Milan Hejduk and Montenegrin theoretical physicist Dragan Hajduković, are likewise derived from this word.

The term "haiduci" was used by the Romanian resistance movement Haiducii Muscelului, between 1947 and 1959, which opposed the Soviet occupation and the Communist government.

In the 2003 viral Moldovan pop song Dragostea Din Tei, the singer begins by introducing himself as a 'haiduc'. In 2004, Haiducii herself released a successful cover of the song.

== Notable hajduks ==
=== Albanian ===
- Çerçiz Topulli (1880–1915), important figure during the Albanian National Awakening and Albanian national hero

=== Armenian ===
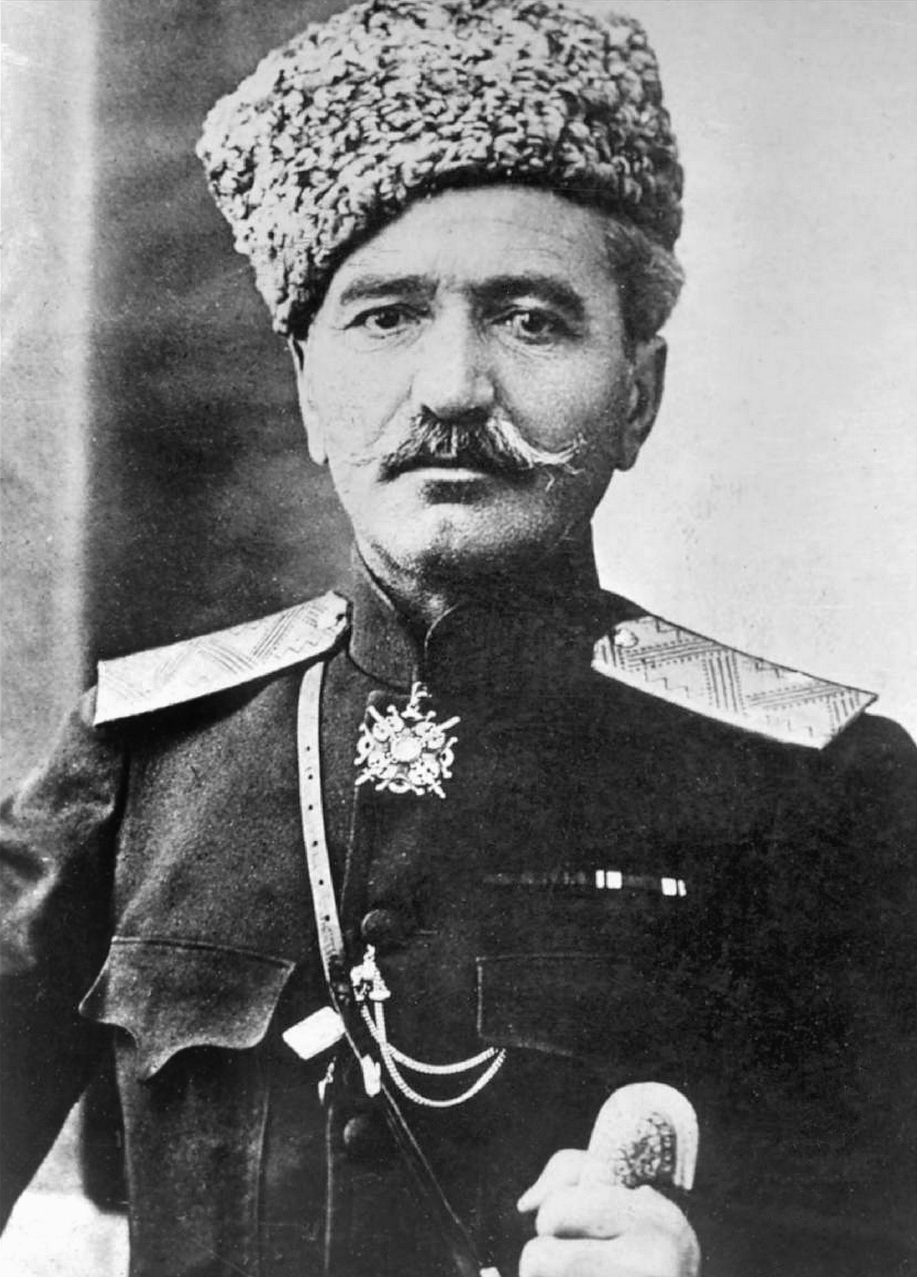
General Andranik Ozanian, wearing his uniform and medals with a papakha hat

- Arabo (1863–1893)
- Aghbiur Serob (1864–1899)
- Andranik (1865–1927)
- Kevork Chavush (1870–1907)

=== Bulgarian ===
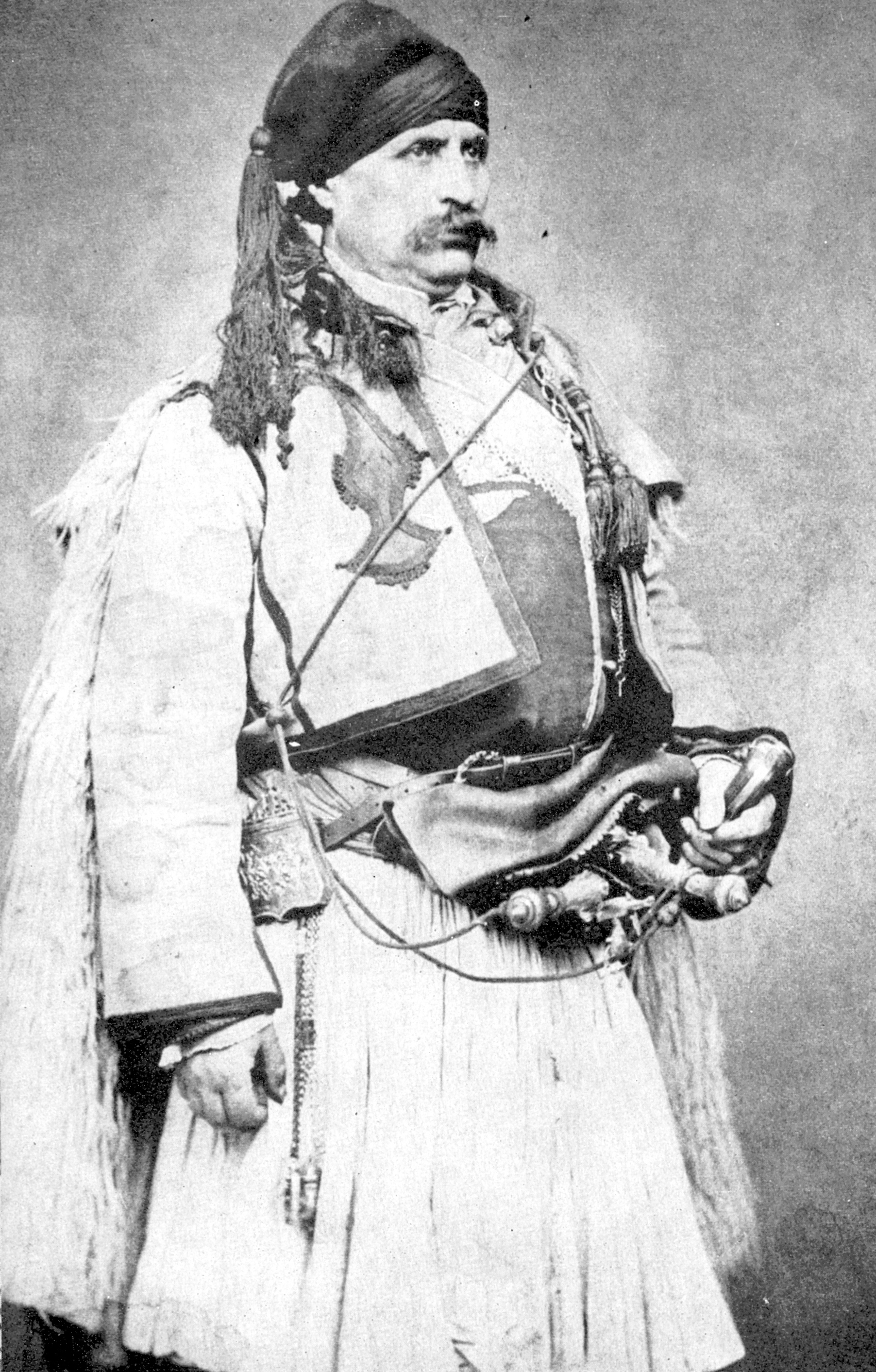
Bulgarian Macedonian Ilyo Voyvoda (1805–1898), known as "the last hayduk".

- Delyo (late 17th and early 18th centuries)
- Chavdar Voyvoda (16th century)
- Indzhe Voyvoda (c. 1755 – 1821)
- Ilyo Voyvoda (1805 (?) – 1898)
- Angel Voyvoda (1812 – c. 1864)
- Captain Petko Voyvoda (1844–1900)
- Panayot Hitov (1830–1918)
- Filip Totyu (1830–1907)
- Hadzhi Dimitar (1840–1868)
- Stefan Karadzha (1840–1868)
- Rumena Voyvoda (1829 – 1862 or 1895) (in Bulgarian)

=== Croatian ===
- Petar Mrkonjić (fl. 1645–69), Venetian-employed guerrilla
- Ilija Perajica (fl. 1685), Venetian-employed guerrilla leader
- Ivan Bušić Roša (1745–1783), Venetian-employed guerrilla leader
- Ivo Senjanin (d. 1612), Habsburg uskok
- Andrijica Šimić (1833–1905), outlaw in Herzegovina
- Mijat Tomić (1610–1656), brigand leader in Ottoman Bosnia
- Vuk Mandušić (?-1648), Venetian-employed guerrilla

=== Greek ===
- Odysseas Androutsos (1788–1825)
- Markos Botsaris (1788–1823)
- Athanasios Diakos (1788–1821)
- Geórgios Karaïskákis (1782–1827)
- Antonis Katsantonis (c. 1775 – 1808)
- Theodoros Kolokotronis (1770–1843)
- Dimitrios Makris (c. 1772 – 1841)
- Nikitas Stamatelopoulos (c. 1784 – 1849)

=== Hungarian ===
- Juraj Jánošík (1688–1713)
- Sándor Rózsa (1813–1878)
- Jóska Sobri (1810–1837)

=== Romanian ===
- Iancu Jianu (1787–1842), hajduk in Oltenia, participant of the Wallachian Uprising
- Popa Șapcă (fl. 1848–64), priest and hajduk in Oltenia, participant in the 1848 Revolutions in Wallachia
- Pintea the Brave (d. 1703), rebel in the area of Maramureș.
- Anghel Panait
- Andrei Popa (1790–1818)
- Radu Anghel (1827-1865)

=== Serbian ===
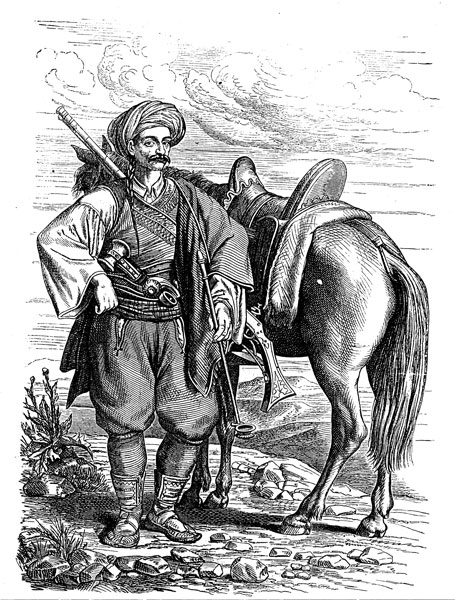
Harambaša from Dalmatia in the 19th century.

- Starina Novak (1530s–1601), Wallachian-employed guerrilla commander, former peasant in Timok
- Deli-Marko (fl. 1596–1619), hajduk and military commander in Habsburg service
- Bajo Pivljanin (fl. 1669–85), Venetian-employed guerrilla leader
- Stanislav Sočivica (1715–1776), brigand leader in Ottoman Bosnia
- Karađorđe (1763–1817), supreme leader of the Serbian Revolution
- Stanko Arambašić (1764–1789), Bimbaša in Mustafa Pasha's Popular Army. and officer of the Serbian Free Corps during Kočina Krajina.
- Stanoje Glavaš (1763–1815), commander in the Serbian Revolution
- Stojan Čupić (c. 1765–1815), commander in the Serbian Revolution
- Hajduk Veljko (c. 1780–1813), commander in the Serbian Revolution
- Zeka Buljubaša (c. 1785–1813), commander in the Serbian Revolution
- Golub Babić (1824–1910), commander in the 1875–77 Herzegovina Uprising
- Petar Popović Pecija (1826–1875), rebel leader in Bosnian Krajina
- Ivan Musić (1848–1888), commander in the 1875–77 Herzegovina Uprising
- Jovo Stanisavljević Čaruga (1897–1925), outlaw in Slavonia

=== Slovak ===
- Juraj Jánošík (1688–1713)

=== Ukrainian ===
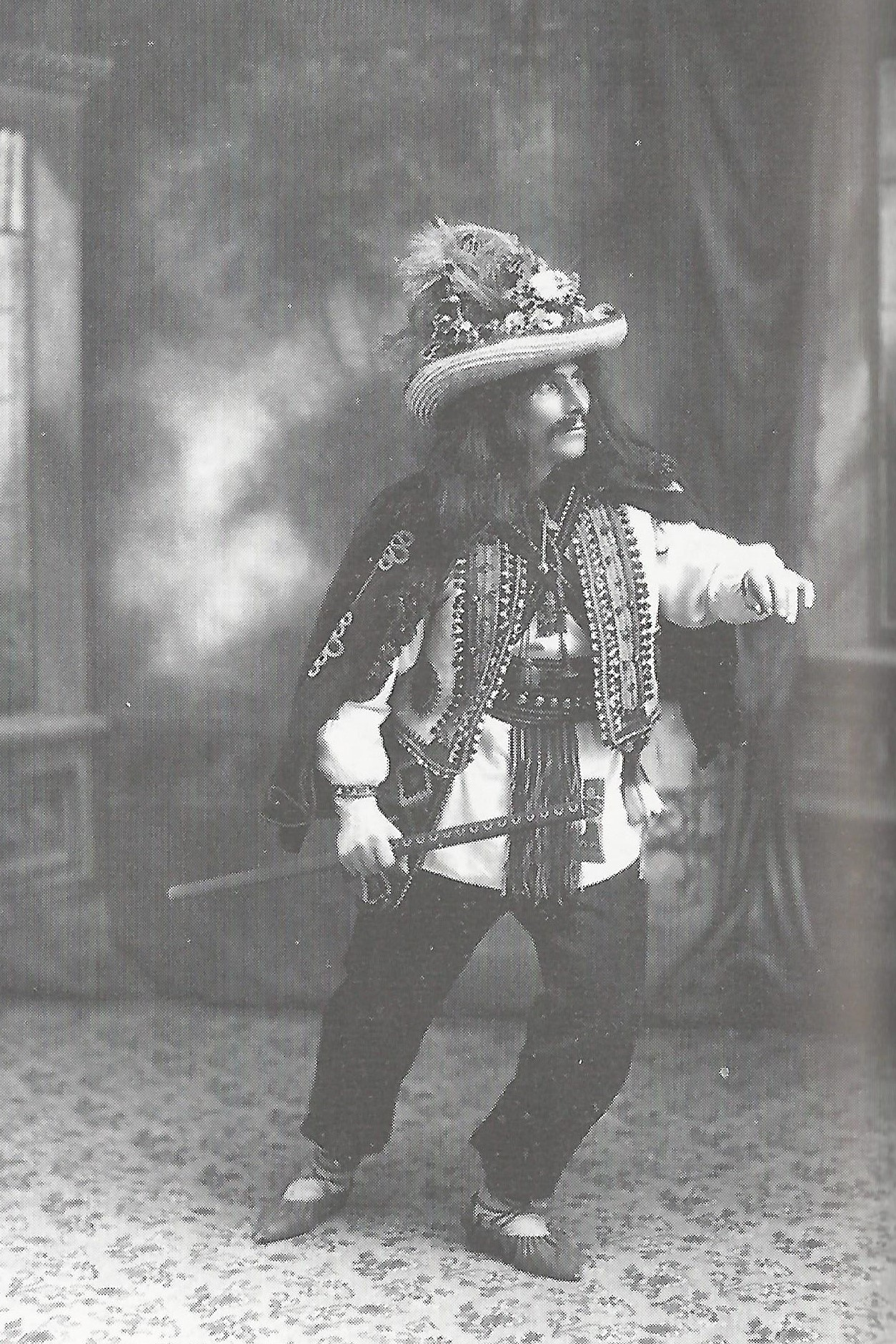
Actor playing Oleksa Dovbush

- Ivan Gonta (1721–1768)
- Ustym Karmaliuk (1787–1835)
- Maksym Zalizniak (1740–1768)

==== Ukrainian Carpathians ====
- Oleksa Dovbush (1700-1745)

=== Regions of Macedonia ===
- Karposh

== See also ==
- Armatoles
- Armenian fedayi, occasionally referred to as hajduks
- Banditry
- Betyár
- Efe (zeybek)
- Early Cossacks, Slavic-Tatar frontier warriors
- Hajdú-Bihar County
- Hajdučka Republika Mijata Tomića, a micronation
- Hayduke, term used by environmental activists
- Kângë Kreshnikësh, an Albanian oral tradition of frontier warrior mythology
- Irregular military
