= Ivanjska, Bosanska Krupa =

Ivanjska Ивањска
- Village
- Location within Bosnia and Herzegovina
- Coordinates: 44°59′34″N 16°13′48″E
- Country: Bosnia and Herzegovina
- Entity: Federation of Bosnia and Herzegovina
- Canton: Una-Sana
- Municipality: Bosanska Krupa

Area
  - Total: 7.78 sq mi (20.14 km^{2})

Population (2013)
  - Total: 309
  - Density: 39.7/sq mi (15.3/km^{2})
- Time zone: UTC+1 (CET)
  - Summer (DST): UTC+2 (CEST)

Ivanjska (Serbian Cyrillic: Ивањска) is a village in the municipality of Bosanska Krupa, Bosnia and Herzegovina.

== Demographics ==
According to the 2013 census, its population was 309.

Ethnicity in 2013
| Ethnicity | Number | Percentage |
|---|---|---|
| Serbs | 291 | 94.2% |
| Bosniaks | 2 | 0.6% |
| other/undeclared | 16 | 5.2% |
| Total | 309 | 100% |
