= Knešpolje =

Area of Bosnia and Herzegovina

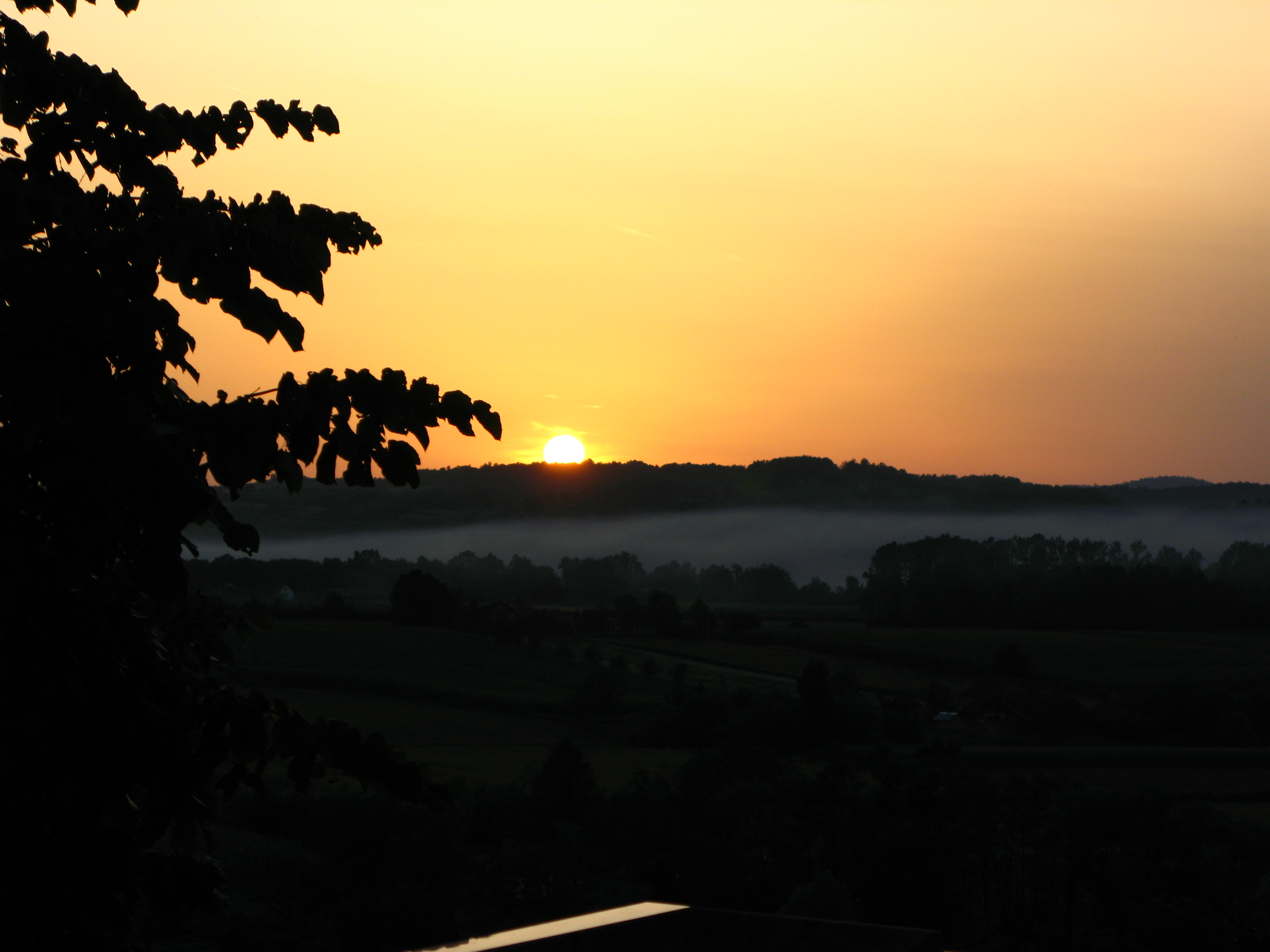
Sunset in Knešpolje.

Knešpolje (Serbian Cyrillic: Кнешпоље) or Knežopolje (Кнежопоље) is a region in northwestern Bosnia and Herzegovina. It is the northwestern part of the Potkozarje geographical region, and includes a region stretching from Prijedor, Kozara mountains, Kozarska Dubica, the Una river and Kostajnica. Its name is derived from knez (count, duke) and polje (field).

== Geography ==
The region lies in northwestern Bosnia and Herzegovina, in the wider Bosanska Krajina region. It is the northwestern part of the Potkozarje geographical region, and includes a region stretching from Prijedor, Kozara mountains, Bosanska Dubica, the Una river and Bosanska Kostajnica.

== History ==
The region is known for its rebellions against Ottoman rule. In 1858, an uprising broke out in the region, known as Pecija's First Revolt.

The region is known as a place where Serbs were persecuted by the Ustashe in World War II; Bosnian Muslim poet Skender Kulenović wrote about the Kozara tragedy.

In the prelude of the Bosnian War, the Serb-organized SAO Bosanska Krajina was proclaimed in the Bosnian Frontier; it was then succeeded by the establishment of Republika Srpska (1992).

== Culture ==
The region is historically Serb-inhabited, and has specific folk traditions. Ojkača is sung with at least three singers and without instrumental music. The local kolo (dance) is the Kozara kolo (Kozaračko kolo). The traditional instrument is tamburica. The region's inhabitants call themselves Knežopoljci, and regard themselves Krajišnici ("frontiersmen").

== See also ==
- Prijedor Field
