= Latika =

- Gender: Female
- Language: Sanskrit

Origin
- Meaning: "Beautiful Hindu Goddess"
- Region of origin: India

Other names
- Variant form: Laṭikā
- Derived: Lata, Letha
- Related names: Letika, Letitsya (Italian)
- Popularity: see popular names

Latika (Sanskrit diacritics: latikā, Hindi: लतिका, Marathi: लटिका) is a Hindu/Sanskrit Indian feminine given name, which means a "Beautiful Hindu Goddess".

== Notable people named Latika ==
- Latika Bourke (born 1984), Australian author and journalist
- Latika Katt (1948–2025), Indian sculptor
- Latika Kumari (born 1992), Indian cricketer
- Latika Nath, Indian author
- Latika Pradhan, Indian politician
- Letika Saran (1952–2014), Indian police office
- Latika Thukral, Indian banker and activist

== Fictional characters ==
- Latika from Danny Boyle's 2008 British Oscar-winning movie, Slumdog Millionaire

== See also ==
- Lata (disambiguation)
- Latha (disambiguation)
