= Thomas Reeves =

Thomas Reeves may refer to:

- Thomas Reeves (VC) (1828–1862), English recipient of the Victoria Cross
- Thomas James Reeves (1895–1941), US Navy radioman
- Thomas C. Reeves (born 1936), US historian
- Thomas C. Reeves (educational technologist), professor emeritus at the University of Georgia

== See also ==
- Thomas Reeve (1673–1737), British justice
- Thomas Reeve (divine) (1594–1672), English royalist and Anglican divine
