= Latas (disambiguation) =

Latas (Serbian: Латас) is a Serbian surname.

Latas may also refer to:

- Latas (Aragonese dynasty), for the noble Spanish surname.
- Latas, Aragon, Spain; a village in Sabiñánigo
- Lattes, Hérault, France (Occitan: Latas), a commune
- PrecisionHawk LATAS (Low Altitude Traffic and Airspace Safety) drone management software

== See also ==
- Lata (disambiguation) for the singular of "Latas"
