= Montenegrin–Ottoman War =

Montenegrin–Ottoman War may refer to:

- Montenegrin–Ottoman War (1852–53)
- Montenegrin–Ottoman War (1861–62)
- Montenegrin–Ottoman War (1876–78)
