= Swaran Lata =

Swaran Lata or Swaranlata may refer to:

- Swaran Lata (singer), a Punjabi singer from Indian Punjab
- Swaran Lata (actress), a Pakistani actress

== See also ==
- Swaran (disambiguation)
- Lata (disambiguation)
