= 77th (East Middlesex) Regiment of Foot =

- Active: 1787–1881
- Country: Kingdom of Great Britain (1787–1800); United Kingdom (1801–1881)
- Branch: British Army
- Type: Line Infantry
- Role: Light Infantry
- Size: One battalion
- Garrison/HQ: Hounslow Barracks
- Nickname: The Pot Hooks
- Colors: Yellow facings
- Engagements: Third Anglo-Mysore War; Fourth Anglo-Mysore War; Polygar Wars; Napoleonic Wars; Crimean War; Indian Rebellion

The 77th (East Middlesex) Regiment of Foot (The Duke of Cambridge's Own) was a line regiment of the British Army, raised in 1787. Under the Childers Reforms it amalgamated with the 57th (West Middlesex) Regiment of Foot to form the Duke of Cambridge's Own (Middlesex Regiment) in 1881.

== History ==
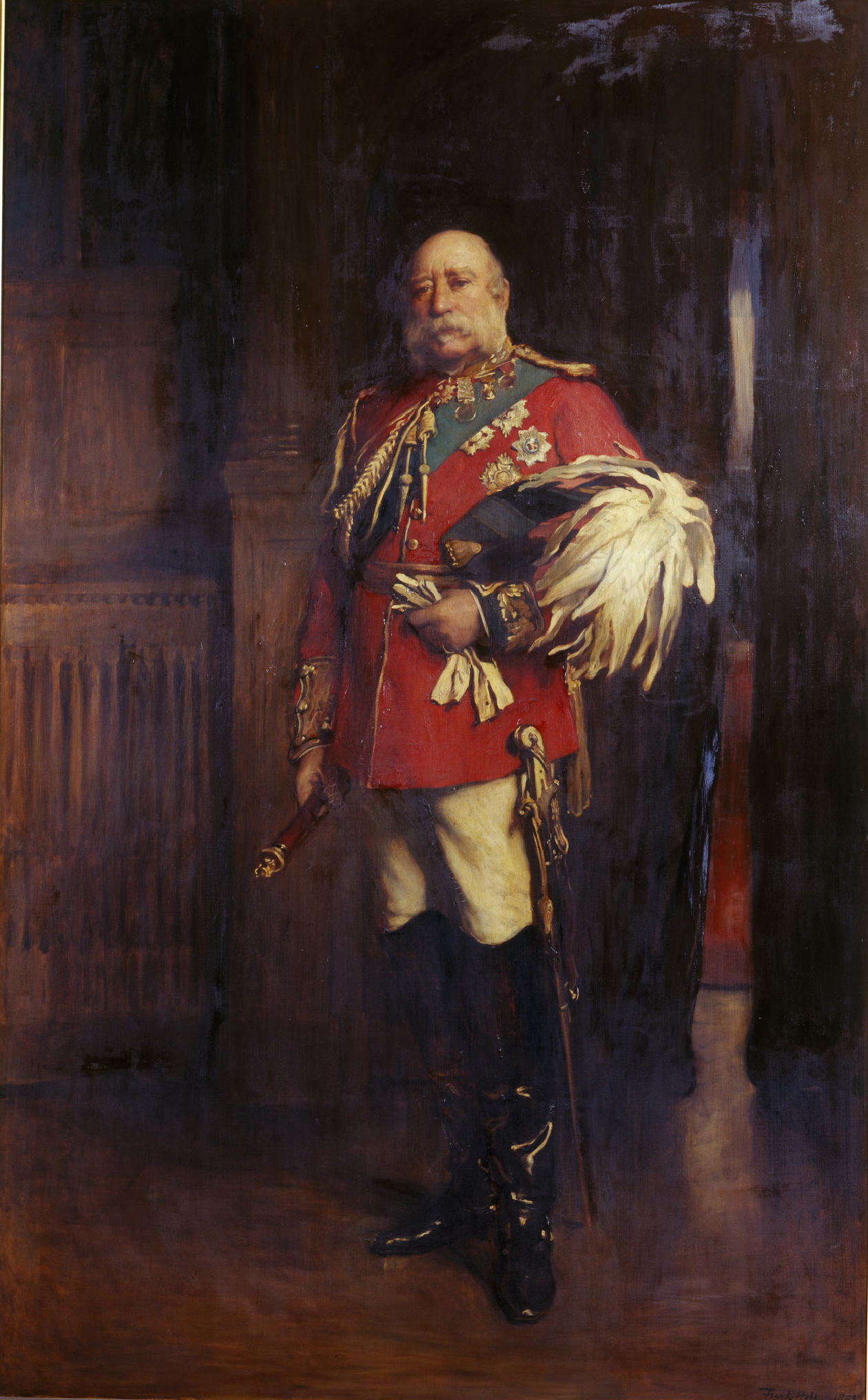
Prince George, Duke of Cambridge after whom the regiment was named

=== Formation ===
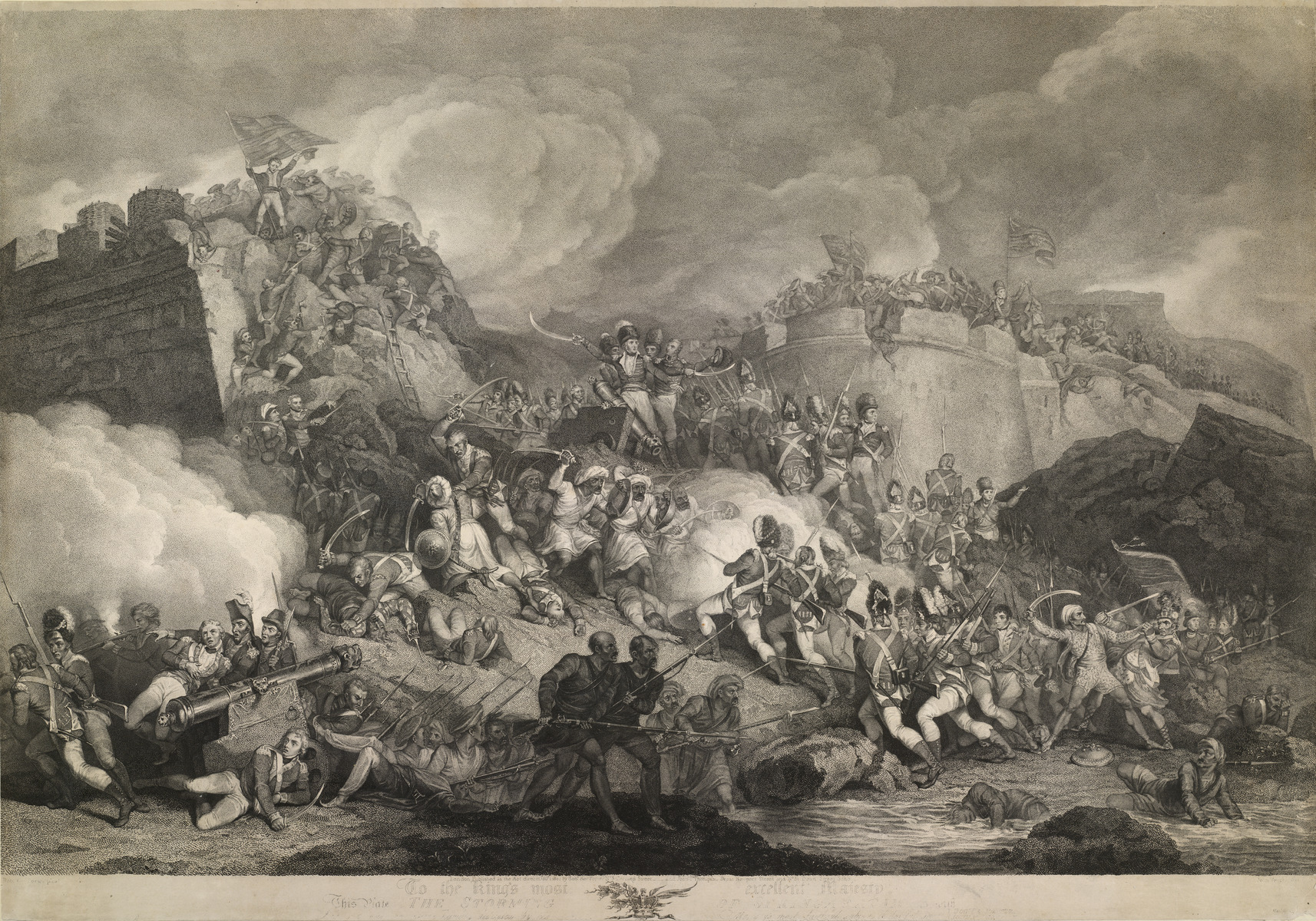
The storming of Seringapatam in April 1799

The regiment was raised by General James Marsh for service in India due to fears that war with France was imminent as the 77th (Hindoostan) Regiment of Foot in October 1787. In accordance with the Declaratory Act 1788 the cost of raising the regiment was recharged to the British East India Company on the basis that the act required that expenses "should be defrayed out of the revenues" arising there. First assembled in Dover in early 1788, the regiment arrived in India in August 1788, and saw action at the siege of Seringapatam in February 1792 in the Third Anglo-Mysore War and the capture of the Dutch settlements in Ceylon in 1795. It also saw action at the Battle of Seedaseer in March 1799 and formed part of the storming part at the siege of Seringapatam in April 1799 during the Fourth Anglo-Mysore War. The regiment also took part in skirmishes at Panjalamcoorchy in March 1801 and Caliarcoil in October 1801 during the Polygar Wars. The regiment then embarked for England in February 1807.

On 29 May 1807 one of the ships carrying the soldiers home, the East Indiaman Ganges, was off the Cape of Good Hope when she sprang a leak. She sank almost due south of Cape Agulhas. There was no loss of life; the East Indiaman St Vincent, which was in company, managed to get all 203 or 209 persons on board Ganges off, including a number of soldiers from the regiment.

=== Napoleonic Wars ===
The regiment was given a county designation, becoming the 77th (East Middlesex) Regiment of Foot in 1807. It took part in the disastrous Walcheren Campaign in autumn 1809 and, having been granted permission to bear the plumes and motto of the Prince of Wales as a badge in commemoration of twenty years service in India in February 1810, it embarked for Spain in June 1811 for service in the Peninsular War. It saw action at the Battle of El Bodón in September 1811, the siege of Ciudad Rodrigo in January 1812 and the siege of Badajoz in March 1812. The regiment then fought at the Battle of Bayonne in April 1814 before returning home in August 1814.

=== The Victorian era ===
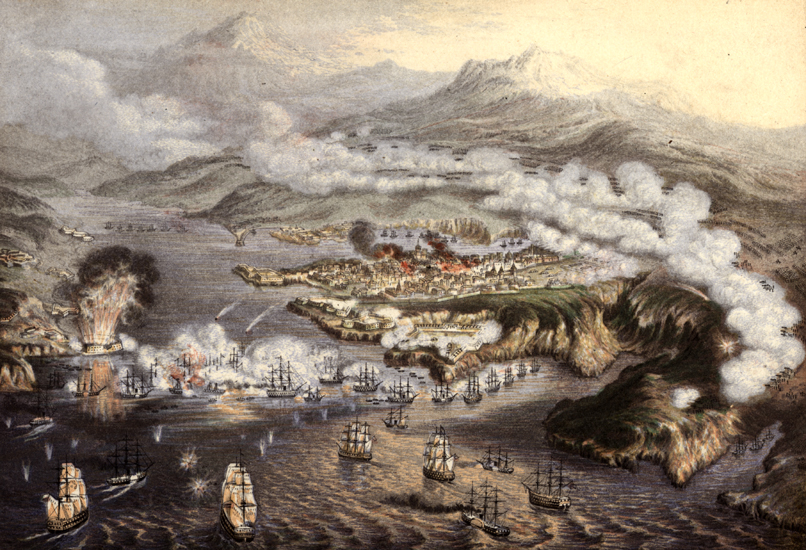
The siege of Sevastopol in winter 1854

The regiment embarked for Jamaica in February 1824 and lost many men to fever there before returning home in June 1834. It embarked for Malta in November 1837 and for Corfu in February 1842. It then embarked for Jamaica again in January 1843 and went on to Halifax in Nova Scotia in January 1846 before embarking for home in May 1848. It sailed for Malta in March 1854 and, having landed at Scutari in April 1854, saw action at the Battle of Alma in September 1854, the Battle of Inkerman in November 1854 and at the siege of Sevastopol in winter 1854. Sergeant John Park and Private Alexander Wright were awarded the Victoria Cross for their actions during the war. The regiment returned home in July 1856.

The regiment embarked for New South Wales in June 1857 and then sailed for India in April 1858 to help suppress the Indian Rebellion before embarking for home again in April 1870. The regiment became 77th (the East Middlesex) Regiment of Foot (The Duke of Cambridge's Own) in June 1876 and were permitted to bear the coronet and cypher of Prince George, Duke of Cambridge on its colours and badges from December 1876. It embarked for India again in August 1880.

As part of the Cardwell Reforms of the 1870s, where single-battalion regiments were linked together to share a single depot and recruiting district in the United Kingdom, the 77th was linked with the 57th (West Middlesex) Regiment of Foot, and assigned to district no. 50 at Hounslow Barracks. On 1 July 1881 the Childers Reforms came into effect and the regiment amalgamated with the 57th (West Middlesex) Regiment of Foot to form the Duke of Cambridge's Own (Middlesex Regiment).

== Battle honours ==
Battle honours won by the regiment were:

- Fourth Anglo-Mysore War: Seringapatam
- Peninsular War: Ciudad Rodrigo, Badajoz, Peninsula
- Crimean War: Alma, Inkerman, Sevastopol

== Victoria Cross recipients ==
- Sergeant John Park, Crimean War (19 April 1855)
- Private Alexander Wright, Crimean War (22 March 1855 and 19 April 1855)

== Colonels of the Regiment ==
Colonels of the Regiment were:

=== 77th (Hindoostan) Regiment of Foot ===
- 1787–1804: Gen. James Marsh
- 1804–1808: Gen. Albemarle Bertie, 9th Earl of Lindsey

=== 77th (the East Middlesex) Regiment of Foot - (1807) ===
- 1808–1811: Gen. Richard Lambart, 7th Earl of Cavan, KC
- 1811: Gen. Sir Charles Hastings, Bt.
- 1811–1815: Lt-Gen. Sir Thomas Picton, GCB
- 1815–1834: Lt-Gen. Sir George Cooke, KCB
- 1834–1840: Lt-Gen. Sir Archibald Campbell, Bt., GCB (of Ava)
- 1840–1851: Lt-Gen. Sir John Macleod, CB, KCH
- 1851–1854: Gen. Sir George Brown, GCB, KH
- 1854–1861: Gen. Sir George Leigh Goldie, KCB
- 1861–1875: Gen. Henry Robinson-Montagu, 6th Baron Rokeby, GCB
- 1875–1881: Gen. Henry Hope Graham, CB

== Sources ==
- Grocott, Terence (1997). Shipwrecks of the revolutionary & Napoleonic eras. Chatham. ISBN 1-86176-030-2.
- Mariner (1826). The mariner's chronicle; or Interesting narratives of shipwrecks. George W. Gorton.
- Woollright, Henry Herriot (1907). Records of the Seventy-Seventh (East Middlesex) The Duke of Cambridge's Own Regiment of Foot now the Second Battalion The Duke of Cambridge's Own (Middlesex Regiment). Aldershot: Gale & Polden.
