= Montenegrin–Ottoman War (1852–1853) =

Date	23 November 1852 – 1 February 1853
Location	Montenegro and Herzegovina Eyalet (Ottoman Empire)
Result	Montenegrin victory

Belligerents
Montenegro	Ottoman Empire

Commanders and leaders
Danilo Petrović-Njegoš; Mirko Petrović-Njegoš	Omar Pasha; Osman Pasha

The Montenegrin–Ottoman War (1852–1853) (Serbian: Црногорско-турски рат, romanized: Crnogorsko-turski rat) broke out after Ottoman retaliation for the Montenegrin secret aid to Herzegovinian rebels.

== Background ==
In 1852, Danilo, returning from the Russian Empire, proclaimed himself Prince of Montenegro and the Hills, thus elevating the status of his polity from a theocracy into a principality. Montenegro remained an Ottoman vassal, until the Ottomans attacked Montenegro after the unraveling of Montenegrin secret aid to Herzegovinian rebels.

== History ==
Omar Pasha and Osman Pasha of Scutari attacked Montenegro in November 1852.

== Aftermath and legacy ==
- Battle of Grahovac
- Convention of Shkodër

== See also ==
- Herzegovina Uprising (1852–1862)
- Montenegrin–Ottoman War (1876–1878)
