= Balmain Cemetery =

Former cemetery in Balmain, New South Wales

Details
- Established: 1868
- Closed: 1912
- Location: Norton and William Streets, Balmain
- Country: Australia
- Coordinates: 33°52′43″S 151°09′27″E
- No. of interments: 10,000+
- Find a Grave: Balmain Cemetery

Balmain Cemetery was a cemetery in Leichhardt, New South Wales, Australia (the area is very close to the present day Sydney suburb of Balmain). The Pioneers Memorial Park now stands in its place.

== History ==
When the estate of Balmain was laid out in 1852, concerns were raised about the failure to reserve land for a cemetery and for parkland.

In August 1863, a meeting of local residents sought to establish a cemetery in Balmain. It was proposed to fund the development of the cemetery by residents subscribing £1 entitling them to one grave plot (or multiples thereof). The government would then match the funds raised by the community. The land would be apportioned into sections for different religions with some land reserved for general use. Although the majority were in favour of the idea, there was opposition to the plan, based on objections of hygiene, the poor use of land (given the expectation that the area would become densely populated), and that it might impede the development of a future highway.

Permission to enable the creation of a cemetery was passed by Parliament in 1864. The Balmain Cemetery Company (a group of five people) was established in the 1860s and purchased a block of land bounded by Derbyshire Road, Allen Street, Norton Street, and William Street (approximately 11 acres). The Balmain Cemetery Company applied for rights over the property in 1880. The cemetery opened in 1868. In 1886 the cemetery was transferred to the Leichhardt Municipal Council. The cemetery was closed in 1912 with over ten thousand burials.

== Pioneers Memorial Park ==
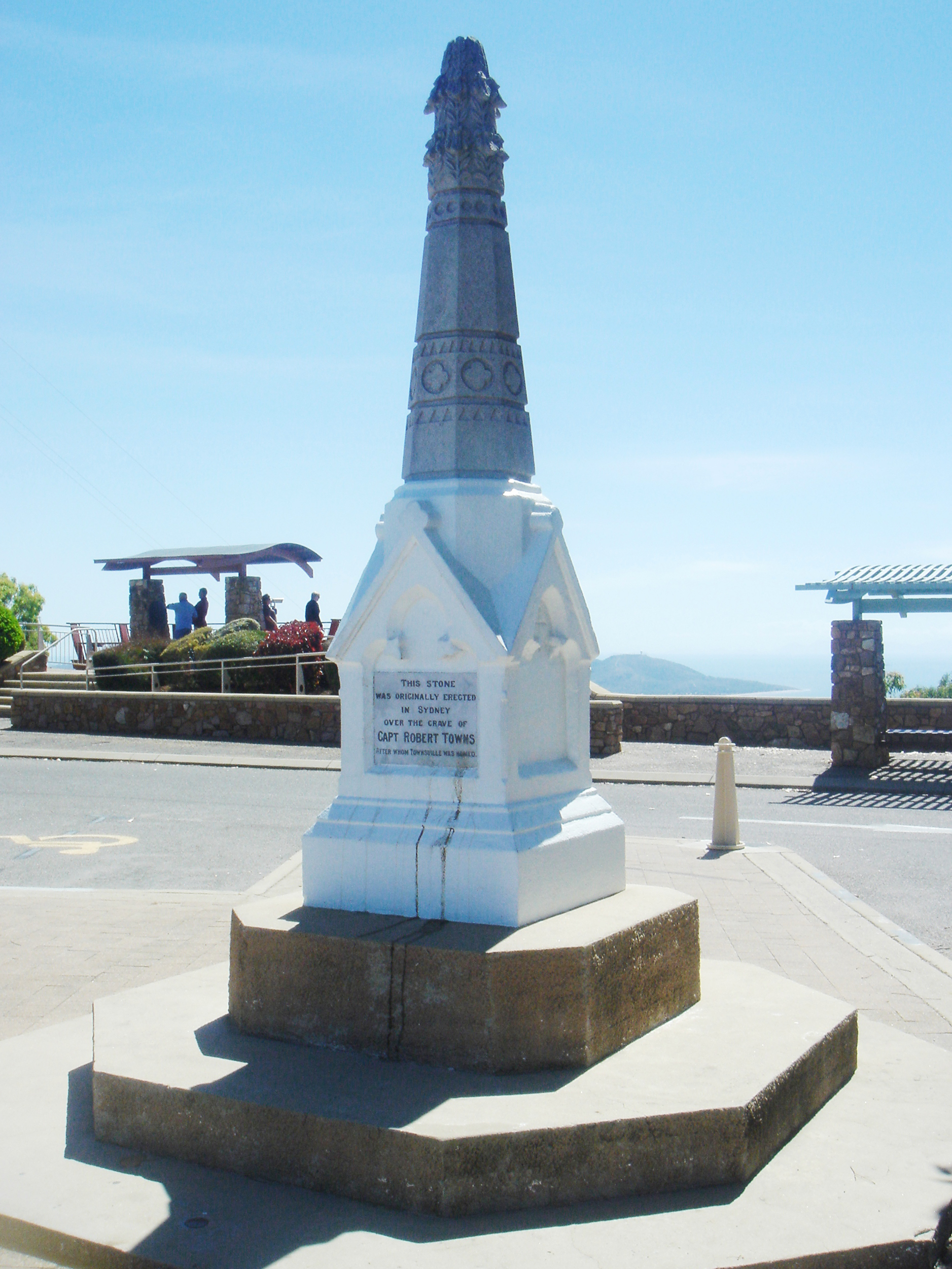
Robert Towns monument, relocated to Castle Hill, Townsville

For the next two decades, a proposal to redevelop the cemetery as a public park was debated. In 1941, it was decided to replace the cemetery with parkland (called Pioneers Memorial Park). The plans were advertised and families were invited to arrange for re-interment of bodies or removal of memorials. As a consequence, the memorial to Robert Towns (the founder of Townsville, Queensland) was relocated to Castle Hill in Townsville. The memorial for Edmund Blacket and his wife Sarah were relocated to Camperdown Cemetery.

== Notable people buried in Balmain Cemetery ==
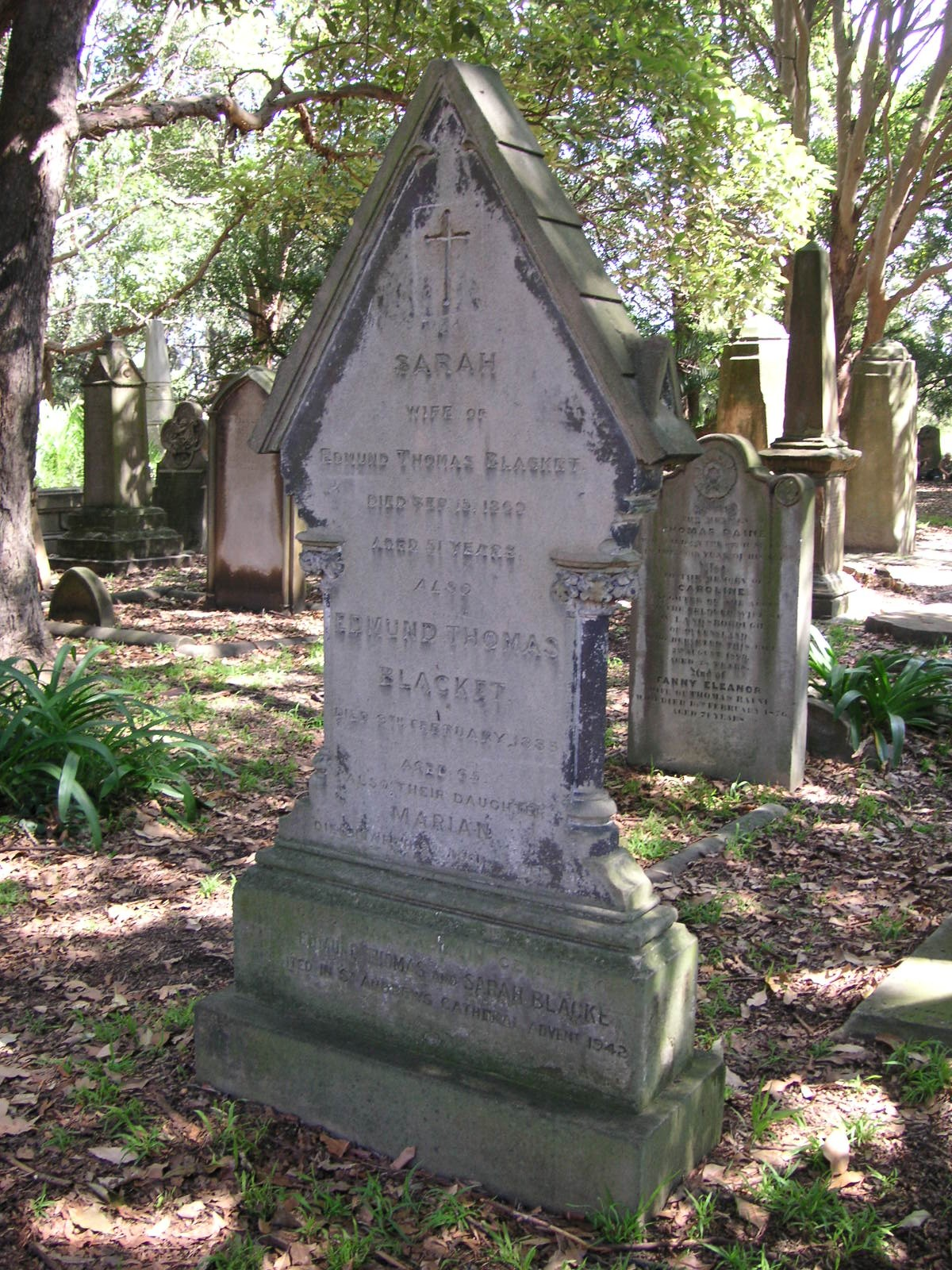
Headstone of Edmund Blacket, relocated to Camperdown Cemetery

- Edmund Blacket, architect
- William Salmon Deloitte, merchant
- Robert D. FitzGerald, botanist
- James Gorman (VC)
- Robert McIntosh Isaacs, politician
- Ninian Melville, politician
- Henry Beaufoy Merlin, photographer, illusionist, artist
- Morris Birkbeck Pell, mathematician
- Ferdinand Hamilton Reuss, architect
- Thomas Stephenson Rowntree, master mariner and shipbuilder
- Robert Towns, founder of Townsville, Queensland
- Mary Reibey, merchant, shipowner and trader
- Charles Frederick Young, actor and comedian
