= James Gorman (VC) =

Recipient of the Victoria Cross

- Born: 21 August 1834; Islington, London
- Died: 18 October 1882 (aged 48); Sydney, Australia
- Burial place: Balmain Cemetery, Leichhardt, New South Wales
- Military career
- Allegiance: United Kingdom
- Branch: Royal Navy
- Rank: Captain of the AfterGuard
- Conflicts: Crimean War; Second Anglo-Chinese War
- Awards: Victoria Cross

James Gorman VC (21 August 1834 – 18 October 1882) was an English recipient of the Victoria Cross, the highest and most prestigious award for gallantry in the face of the enemy that can be awarded to British and Commonwealth forces.

Gorman was 20 years old, and a seaman in the Naval Brigade of the Royal Navy during the Crimean War when the following deed took place for which he was awarded the VC.

On 5 November 1854 at the Battle of Inkerman, Crimea, when the Right Lancaster Battery was attacked and many of the soldiers were wounded, Seaman Gorman, with two other seamen (Thomas Reeves and Mark Scholefield) and two others who were killed during the action, mounted the defence work banquette and, under withering attack from the enemy, kept up a rapid, repulsing fire. Their muskets were re-loaded for them by the wounded soldiers under the parapet and eventually the enemy fell back and gave no more trouble.

He later served in the Second Anglo-Chinese War and achieved the rank of Captain of the AfterGuard. He is buried in the Old Balmain Cemetery, Norton Street, Leichhardt, New South Wales, Australia, which in 1944 was closed and converted to a public park, "Pioneers Memorial Park". There is a plaque in his memory on the War Memorial in Loyalty Square, Balmain.
