= Lata =

Latha
- Gender: Female
- Language: Hindi; Sanskrit; Telugu; Kannada

Origin
- Meaning: "creeper" "Durga"
- Region of origin: India

Other names
- Related names: Latha, Lathe

Latha (Hindi: लता, Kannada: ಲತಾ) is a Hindu Indian female given name, which means "creeper" and "Durga". Latha may refer to:

== Notable people named Lata ==
- Lata Mangeshkar (1929–2022), Indian singer.
- Lata Bhatt (born 1954), Indian singer.
- Lata (born 1975), Musician.
- Lata Mondal (born 1993), Bangladeshi cricket player
- Lata Narvekar, (born 1940), Indian producer and stage actress.
- Lata Pada (born 1947), Canadian choreographer and dancer.
- Lata Sabharwal (born 1975), Indian actress and model.

== See also ==
- Latha (disambiguation)
- A Suitable Boy - Wikipedia - the main character of A Suitable Boy is called Latha.
