= Lata (disambiguation) =

Lata (Hindi: लता) is a Sanskrit female given name.

Lata or LATA may also refer to:

== Places ==
- Lata, Solomon Islands
- Lata, a village in Gulripshi District of Abkhazia
- Lata Mountain, American Samoa
- Lāṭa, a historical region of India

== Other uses ==
- Local access and transport area (LATA), an American telecommunications regulation
- Alternative name for lokša, a type of flatbread

== See also ==
- Latha (disambiguation)
- Latas (disambiguation)
- Swaran (disambiguation)
- Lota (name)
