= Battle of Ostrog =

1862 Ottoman-Montenegrin battle

- Part of Montenegrin–Ottoman War (1861–1862)
Location	Montenegro, Ostrog
Result	Ottoman victory

Belligerents
Ottoman Empire	Montenegro

Commanders and leaders
Omar Pasha	Nikola I

Units involved
Unknown	3,000–10,000

The Battle of Ostrog was one of the major battles of the Ottoman-Montenegrin war. It ended with an Ottoman victory. After the Ottoman victory, Montenegro accepted a peace treaty with the Ottoman Empire.

The Montenegrin army consisted of thirty battalions of infantry with 848 men in each line, and a corps of cavalry consisting of 3,000–10,000 men. The size of the Ottoman Army is unknown. The Montenegrin artillery was set up in the mountains.

The battle ended with an Ottoman victory as Montenegrin forces failed to hold in Ostrog.
