= Alexander Wright (VC) =

Recipient of the Victoria Cross

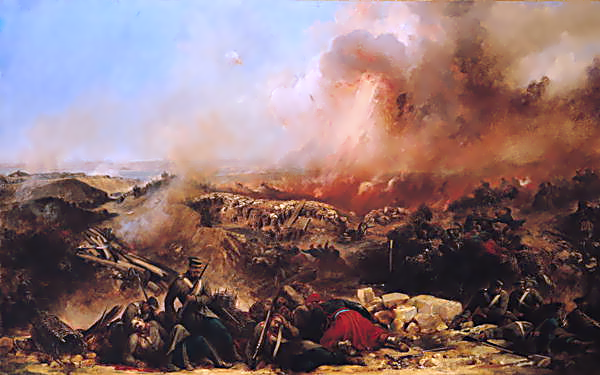
- Depiction of the Siege of Sebastopol
- Born: 1826; Ballymena, County Antrim, Ireland
- Died: 28 July 1858 (aged 31–32); Calcutta, India
- Military career
- Allegiance: United Kingdom
- Branch: British Army
- Rank: Private
- Units: 77th (East Middlesex) Regiment of Foot
- Conflicts: Crimean War; Indian Mutiny
- Awards: Victoria Cross

Alexander Wright VC (1826 – 28 July 1858) was a British Army soldier and an Irish recipient of the Victoria Cross, the highest award for gallantry in the face of the enemy that can be awarded to British and Commonwealth forces.

== Background ==
Alexander Wright was born in Ballymena, in what is now Northern Ireland.

== Details ==
He was about 29 years old, and a private in the 77th (East Middlesex) Regiment of Foot (later The Middlesex Regiment (Duke of Cambridge's Own)), British Army during the Crimean War when the following deed took place for which he was awarded the VC.

On 22 March 1855 at the Siege of Sebastopol, in the Crimean Peninsula, Private Wright distinguished himself in repelling a sortie. On 19 April he showed great bravery at the taking of the Russian Rifle Pits and was particularly noticed for the encouragement he gave the other men while holding the Pits under very heavy fire; he was wounded in this action. He again showed great courage on 30 August 1855, and throughout the war.

Wright and John Park were the only two soldiers of the 77th Regiment awarded the Victoria Cross for the Crimean War. In 1857, both were with their regiment when it was allotted to New South Wales and missed the first VC investiture at Hyde Park, London, on 26 June 1857. The medals were sent to the General Officer Commanding New South Wales who presented the medals in Sydney in 1858 as the regiment was preparing to sail to India. Craig Wilcox notes ‘The Victoria Crosses awarded Sergeant Park and Private Wright of the 77th Regiment were conferred hastily, almost furtively, as the regiment was about to leave Sydney, to help suppress the Indian Mutiny’.

He was killed in action on 28 July 1858 during intense fighting in Calcutta. His body was not recovered and he has no known grave.

His Victoria Cross is displayed at the Princess of Wales's Royal Regiment (Queen's and Royal Hampshires) Museum in Dover Castle, England.
