= Janja Gora =

- Village
- Location within Croatia
- Coordinates: 45.09361°N 15.39917°E
- Country: Croatia
- County: Karlovac
- Municipality: Plaški

Area
  - Total: 19.3 km^{2} (7.5 sq mi)

Population (2021)
  - Total: 90
  - Density: 4.7/km^{2} (12/sq mi)
- Time zone: UTC+1 (CET)
  - Summer (DST): UTC+2 (CEST)

Janja Gora is a village in the municipality of Plaški, in the Lika region of Croatia. It is located 9 km northeast of the municipal seat at Plaški.

It was historically known as Tuk. Prior to the administrative reorganization of SR Croatia, it was part of the municipality of Ogulin. During the Croatian War of Independence, the region was occupied by rebel Serbs. The village is ecclesiastically part of the Serbian Orthodox Eparchy of upper Karlovac. The village has a Serbian majority.

Omar Pasha (1806–1871), the Ottoman general and governor, was born in the village.

Demographic history
Ethnic group	1948	1953	1961	1971	1981	1991	2001	2011
Serbs	n/a	n/a	882 (99,43%)	733 (95,44%)	466 (78,84%)	460 (98,08%)	92 (77,96%)	
Yugoslavs	n/a	n/a	2 (0,22%)	27 (3,51%)	121 (20,47%)	2 (0,42%)		
Croats	n/a	n/a	1 (0,11%)	2 (0,26%)	1 (0,16%)			
Others, unknown	n/a	n/a	2 (0,22%)	6 (0,78%)	3 (0,50%)	7 (1,49%)	26 (22,03%)	
Total	966	985	887	768	591	469	118	
