= Latas =

Surname found mainly in Serbia, Poland, Croatia, but also Spain and Portugal

Latas (Serbian: Латас) is a surname, found in many countries in Europe, mainly in Serbia, Poland, Croatia, but also Spain and Portugal from Middle Ages. However their mutual geographical and lexical origin is undetermined.

== Slavic surname ==
This surname in the countries of ex-Yugoslavia is not tied to any ethnicity or confession, yet territory (Dinara). Croatian linguist, Petar Šimunović, derived Lat from personal name Láto (Latif), meaning gentle. The second part as is ending suffix, mostly found in personal names among Vlach pastoralist communities from Dinara.

== List of people with surname Latas ==
- Omar Pasha, born Mihajlo Latas (1806–1871), Ottoman general and governor.
- Branko Latas Vrška, Serbian political scientist, historian and colonel in the Yugoslav People's Army.
- Dragan Pavloviḱ Latas, Macedonian journalist.

== See also ==
- Latas (Aragonese dynasty) for the noble Spanish surname.
