= Mark Scholefield =

Recipient of the Victoria Cross

- Born: 16 April 1828; London, England
- Died: 15 February 1858 (aged 29); On board HMS Acorn
- Burial place: Buried at sea
- Military career
- Allegiance: United Kingdom
- Branch: Royal Navy
- Rank: Quartermaster
- Units: HMS Albion
- Conflicts: Crimean War
- Awards: Victoria Cross

Mark Scholefield, VC (16 April 1828 – 15 February 1858) was a sailor in the Royal Navy and a recipient of the Victoria Cross, the highest award for gallantry in the face of the enemy that can be awarded to British and Commonwealth forces.

== Royal Navy career ==
Scholefield was 26 years old, and a seaman in the Royal Navy, serving in the Naval Brigade, during the Crimean War when he was awarded the Victoria Cross (VC).

On 5 November 1854 at the Battle of Inkerman, Crimea, the Right Lancaster Battery was attacked and many of the soldiers were wounded. Seaman Scholefield with two other seamen (James Gorman and Thomas Reeves) and two others who were killed during the action, mounted the defense work banquette and, under withering attack from the enemy, kept up a rapid, repulsing fire. The muskets were re-loaded for them by the wounded soldiers under the parapet and eventually the enemy fell back and gave no more trouble.

Scholefield later achieved the rank of quartermaster. His VC is on display in the Lord Ashcroft Gallery at the Imperial War Museum, London.
