= John Park (VC) =

Recipient of the Victoria Cross

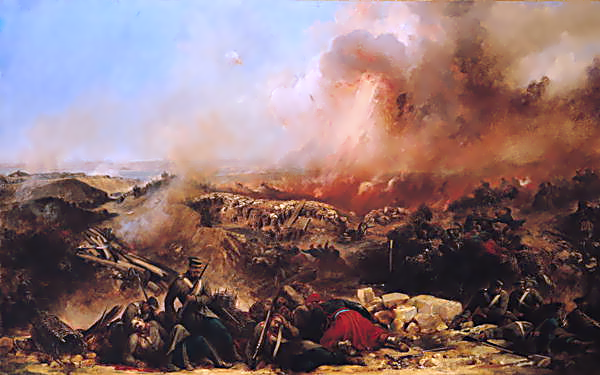
- Depiction of the Siege of Sebastopol
- Born: February 1835; Derry, Ireland
- Died: 16 May 1863 (aged 28); Allahabad, India
- Burial place: Allahabad Cemetery
- Military career
- Allegiance: United Kingdom
- Branch: British Army
- Rank: Sergeant
- Units: 77th (East Middlesex) Regiment of Foot
- Conflicts: Crimean War
- Awards: Victoria Cross

John Park VC (February 1835 – 16 May 1863), born in Derry, Ireland, was an Irish recipient of the Victoria Cross, the highest and most prestigious award for gallantry in the face of the enemy that can be awarded to British and Commonwealth forces.

== Details ==
Park was 19 years old, and a sergeant in the 77th Regiment (later The Middlesex Regiment – Duke of Cambridge's Own), British Army during the Crimean War when the following deeds took place for which he was awarded the Victoria Cross.

During the Crimean War on 20 September 1854 at the Battle of the Alma and on 5 November 1854 at the Battle of Inkerman, Sergeant Park showed great bravery. On 19 April 1855, Park also distinguished himself at the taking of the Russian Rifle Pits, during which he was severely wounded. He showed great resolution at both attacks on the Redan.

Park's citation reads:

For conspicuous bravery at the Battles of Alma and Inkerman. Highly distinguished at the taking of the Russian Rifle Pits, on the night of the 19th April, 1855. His valour, during that attack, called forth the approbation of the late Colonel Egerton. He was severely wounded. Remarked for determined resolution at both attacks on the Redan.

Park and Alexander Wright were the only two soldiers of the 77th Regiment awarded the Victoria Cross for the Crimean War. In 1857, both were with their regiment when it was allotted to New South Wales and missed the first VC investiture at Hyde Park, London, on 26 June 1857. The medals were sent to the General Officer Commanding New South Wales who presented the medals in Sydney in 1858 as the regiment was preparing to sail to India. Craig Wilcox notes ‘The Victoria Crosses awarded Sergeant Park and Private Wright of the 77th Regiment were conferred hastily, almost furtively, as the regiment was about to leave Sydney, to help suppress the Indian Mutiny’.

Park died in Allahabad, India, on 16 May 1863, from sunstroke.
