= Herzegovina uprising (1852–1862) =

Uprising by Serbs in Eastern Herzegovina

Herzegovinian Uprising (1852–1862)
- Part of Serb uprisings against the Ottoman Empire
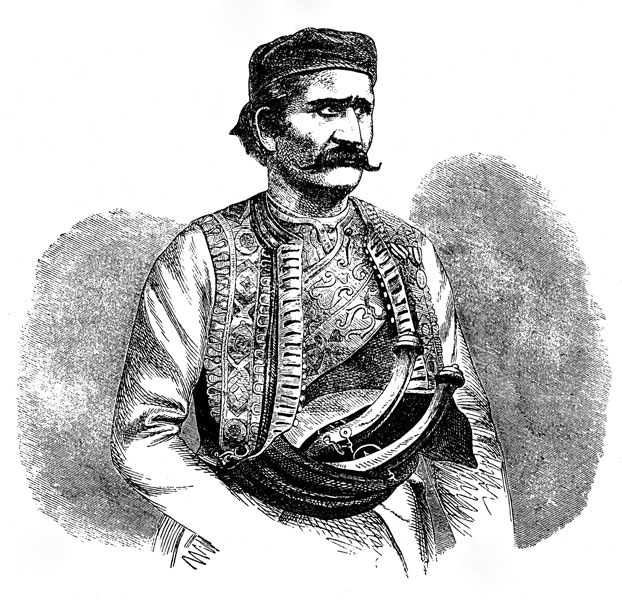
- Duke Luka Vukalović, leader of the uprising.
Date	1852–1862 (negotiations concluded in 1863)
Location	Eastern Herzegovina, Ottoman Empire (Zubci, Popovo Polje, Sutorina, Kruševice, Orahovica)
Result	Ottoman military victory; settlement signed in Dubrovnik and Mostar.
Territorial changes	Temporary rebel self-governance in the border zone.

Belligerents
Herzegovinian rebels Montenegro (support)	Ottoman Empire

Commanders and leaders
Luka Vukalović; Prodan Rupar; Jovo Vukalović; Prince Danilo; Prince Nicholas; Grand Voivode Mirko	Omar Pasha

Strength
c. 4,000 fighters (at peak deployment)	Significantly superior regular and irregular Ottoman troops (including Albanian units)

The Herzegovinian Uprising (1852–1862), also known in historiography as Vukalović's Uprising, was a long-term armed resistance of the Serb population in Eastern Herzegovina against Ottoman rule. The uprising was initiated and led throughout the decade by the Herzegovinian duke and gunsmith Luka Vukalović.

== Causes and Background ==
The primary causes of the uprising lay in the difficult economic position of the Christian population (the rayah), the forced collection of back taxes, and constant pressure from local Ottoman landowners. The immediate catalyst in the winter of 1852 was an attempt to implement the reforms of Omar Pasha, who ordered the forced confiscation of weapons from the border clans. The inhabitants of the Zubci clan, traditionally known for their gunsmithing trade and established local self-governance, refused this order and rose in arms.

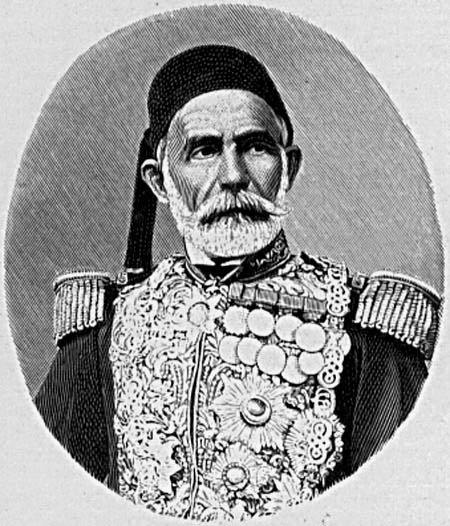
Omar Pasha, Ottoman general.

== Outbreak and the Assembly in Grahovo (1852) ==
The uprising officially broke out in 1852 in the area east of Trebinje, along the border with Montenegro. In order to organize a unified resistance against the confiscation of weapons and back taxes, the Herzegovinian chieftains decided to coordinate their actions. Chieftains from Banjani, Rudinjani, Korita, Gacko, and Nevesinje gathered on 24 April 1852 in Grahovo. At this assembly, a decision was made to seek counsel from the Montenegrin Prince Danilo. Prince Danilo advised them to maintain complete inflexibility, as a result of which the rebel chieftains flatly rejected all negotiation offers from the Ottoman authorities in Mostar.

The subsequent Montenegrin capture of Žabljak served as a pretext for the Sublime Porte to officially declare war on Montenegro. During the summer of 1852, the Porte undertook major operations against the Herzegovinian rebels, engaging both regular troops and irregular Albanian units. Faced with overwhelming force, the rebels were quickly defeated militarily, and an amnesty was proclaimed in March 1853, after which Omar Pasha focused on a final confrontation with Montenegro.

== Second Phase and the Battle of Grahovac (1857–1858) ==
Following a temporary lull, Luka Vukalović raised a new uprising in December 1857 in Orahovica. This movement followed an agreement reached in September of that year among the chieftains of Banjani, Piva, Drobnjaci, Šaranci, Nikšić, Rudinjani, Gacko, and Golija. The uprising once again encompassed the clans of eastern Herzegovina in the immediate vicinity of the Montenegrin border.

In January 1858, with Montenegrin assistance, a major Ottoman assault was successfully repulsed. In the meantime, the Austrian Empire closed its borders to the rebels, severely hindering their logistics and supply lines. The Porte decided to settle scores with Montenegro first and launched an expedition with 10,000 soldiers. However, at the famous Battle of Grahovac (1 May 1858), the Ottoman army was decisively routed. Following the intervention of the Great Powers, hostilities were ceased and the uprising was temporarily pacified.

The Herzegovinian rebels demanded international guarantees for the execution of reforms, alongside the simultaneous disarmament of both Muslims and Christians. A treaty under these terms was attempted in Dubrovnik, but it failed because it became certain that Ottoman rule would remain absolute. Consequently, the inhabitants of the border region began recognizing Montenegrin authority, and Prince Danilo appointed Vukalović as the voivode of Zubci, Kruševice, and Dračevica.

=== Parallel events: Pecija's Revolt (1857) ===
Synchronous with the events in Herzegovina, a revolt broke out in the Bosanska Posavina and Bosanska Krajina regions in December 1857. This movement, named after its leader Petar Popović Pecija, entered historiography as Pecija's First Revolt.

== Third phase, defeat, and the peace settlement (1861–1863) ==
A new Herzegovinian uprising broke out in 1861. Luka Vukalović raised a movement of even wider proportions, receiving strong backing from the new Montenegrin Prince Nicholas and Grand Voivode Mirko Petrović. However, Omar Pasha launched a massive offensive and dealt a decisive military defeat to the Montenegrins, resulting in the conclusion of the Peace of Rijeka Crnojevića.

The defeat of Montenegro and the severing of logistics forced Vukalović to open peace negotiations with the Ottoman authorities in Dubrovnik in September 1863. Vukalović declared his submission to the Sultan, and in return, specific terms were agreed upon:

- The Sultan appointed him as a bimbashi (commander) in a part of eastern Herzegovina, with an annual salary of 1,800 florins.
- He received the official right to maintain a paid detachment of 500 pandurs (security guards) to maintain order.
- The region covered by the uprising was completely exempted from taxes for 5 years, with significant tax reliefs scheduled for the subsequent period.

This peace treaty was later officially ratified in Mostar through the direct mediation of the Austrian consul.

== Rebel cadre and continuity with 1875 ==
Although this ten-year conflict ended in pacification and compromise, it served as a primary military and organizational school for a new generation of Herzegovinian leaders. It preserved a rebel network that thirteen years later would launch the Herzegovinian Uprising of 1875, popularly known as the Nevesinje Gun (Nevesinjska puška).

During this decade (1852–1862), knez Prodan Rupar began gaining his first combat and guerrilla experience. The experience of campaigning, skirmishing with Ottoman units, and military organization that Rupar developed during this decade was crucial for his later emergence as a principal initiator, strategist, and leader of the great 1875 uprising in Nevesinje. This established a direct generational and ideological continuity between Vukalović's original movement and the eventual liberation of Herzegovina.

== See also ==
- Montenegrin–Ottoman War (1852–1853)
- Epirus Revolt of 1854

== Sources ==
- Bataković, Dušan T. (1996). The Serbs of Bosnia & Herzegovina: History and Politics. Dialogue Association. "The Uprisings in Herzegovina, 1852-1862"
- Nebojša Bogunović (10 December 2013). Iz srpske istorije. eBook Portal. pp. 94–. GGKEY:TEEA3BSLU7B.
- Dušan M. Berić; Milorad Ekmečić (1994). Ustanak u Hercegovini 1852–1862. Srpska akademija nauka i umetnosti.
- Vladimir Stojančević (1971). Južnoslovenski narodi u Osmanskom Carstvu od Jedrenskog mira 1829. do Pariskog kongresa 1856. godine. Izdavačko-štamparsko preduzeće PTT.
- Pregled istorije jugoslovenskih naroda: Od 1849.g. do 1959g. Zavod za izdavanje Republike Srbije. 1960.
