= Savarna (disambiguation) =

Savarna may refer to:

- Savarna, a genus of spiders
- Savarna (Hinduism), the four varnas (divisions) in the caste system of India
- Savarna (gotra), a Hindu gotra (clan) of Brahmins
- Savarna Deergha Sandhi, a 2019 Indian film

== See also ==
- Swaran (disambiguation)
- Dalit or avarna (without varna), Indian castes outside the savarna or four varnas
- Forward caste
