= Prodan Rupar =

- Born: 1815; Trusina
- Died: 1877 (aged 61–62) Plana, Bileća
- Allegiance: Principality of Montenegro (allied); Herzegovinian Rebels
- Rank: Voivode / Rebel Commander
- Conflicts: Herzegovina Uprising (1852–1862); Herzegovina Uprising (1875–1877)

Prodan Rupar (Serbian Cyrillic: Продан Рупар; 1815 – June 1877) was a prominent Serb chieftain, local elder, and the primary organizers of the Herzegovina Uprising (1875–1877), historically known as the Nevesinjska puška (Nevesinje Rifle). His extensive guerrilla warfare experience and local authority positioned him as a central figure in the initial stages of the armed resistance against Ottoman rule, an escalation that triggered the Great Eastern Crisis.

== Early Life and Preceding Conspiracies ==
Rupar was born in 1815 in the village of Trusina near Nevesinje, into a prominent Herzegovinian Serb family. Recognized for his decisiveness, he was chosen as a local village chieftain (knez), representing the Christian peasantry (raja) under the jurisdiction of the Nevesinje kadiluk.

He gained his initial military experience during the earlier Herzegovina Uprising (1852–1862) under the supreme command of Voivode Luka Vukalović. During this decade of intermittent warfare, Rupar mastered the regional terrain and traditional Balkan guerrilla tactics, while establishing clandestine diplomatic links with Montenegrin chieftains on Cetinje.

== The 1875 Uprising ==
Driven by exorbitant agrarian taxes (the collection of the tretćina and desetina) and the general lawlessness of local Ottoman beys, Rupar convened secret assemblies during August and September 1874 with other regional leaders, including Jovan Gutić, Simun Zečević, Petar Radović, Ilija Stevanović, and Trivko Grubačić. The leaders finalized logistics regarding weapons caches, the localization of mountain shelters for civilians, and securing foreign aid.

In October 1874, Rupar and Gutić traveled secretly to Cetinje to secure the backing of Prince Nicholas I of Montenegro. Prince Nicholas promised logistics, weaponry, and volunteers, but requested that the open revolt be postponed until the spring of 1875 due to international diplomatic constraints.

By early summer, Ottoman authorities caught wind of the conspiracy and attempted to arrest the ringleaders. Rupar fled to the mountains with his armed escorts. On 9 July 1875, under his tactical leadership at the Gradac hill near Kifino Selo, the rebels ambushed an Ottoman gendarmerie patrol. This clash marked the formal outbreak of the Herzegovina Uprising.

During the conflict, Rupar successfully commanded rebel detachments in the defensive victory at the Ovčiji Brod bridge, cutting off Ottoman communications between Mostar and Nevesinje. He also joined the rebel delegation that met with European consular envoys in Mostar, presenting demands for religious equality and agrarian reform. Within the rebel leadership, Rupar consistently advocated for the operational autonomy of local Herzegovinian units against attempts by Montenegrin officers to centralize military command.

== Death and Legacy ==
In June 1877, during the intense final stages of the eastern campaign and preceding the international resolutions of the Congress of Berlin, Prodan Rupar was killed in action while defending the strategic town of Bileća against advancing Ottoman forces in the locality of Plana.

As a primary architect of the anti-feudal liberation movement in Herzegovina, Rupar became a enduring national symbol of resistance. A monument commemorating his actions stands in his native Trusina, and numerous streets across Republika Srpska are named in his honor.

== Bibliography ==
- Čubrilović, Vaso (1996). Bosanski ustanak 1875—1878. Belgrade: SANU.
- Ekmečić, Milorad (1973). Ustanak u Bosni 1875—1878. Sarajevo: Službeni list SRBiH.
- Ćorović, Vladimir (1997). Istorija srpskog naroda. Banja Luka: Glas srpski.

== See also ==
- Montenegrin–Ottoman War (1876–78)
