= Omar Pasha =

Ottoman general and governor

Omer Lutfi Pasha Serdar-ı Ekrem Ömer Paşa
- Омер-паша Латас; Omer-paša Latas
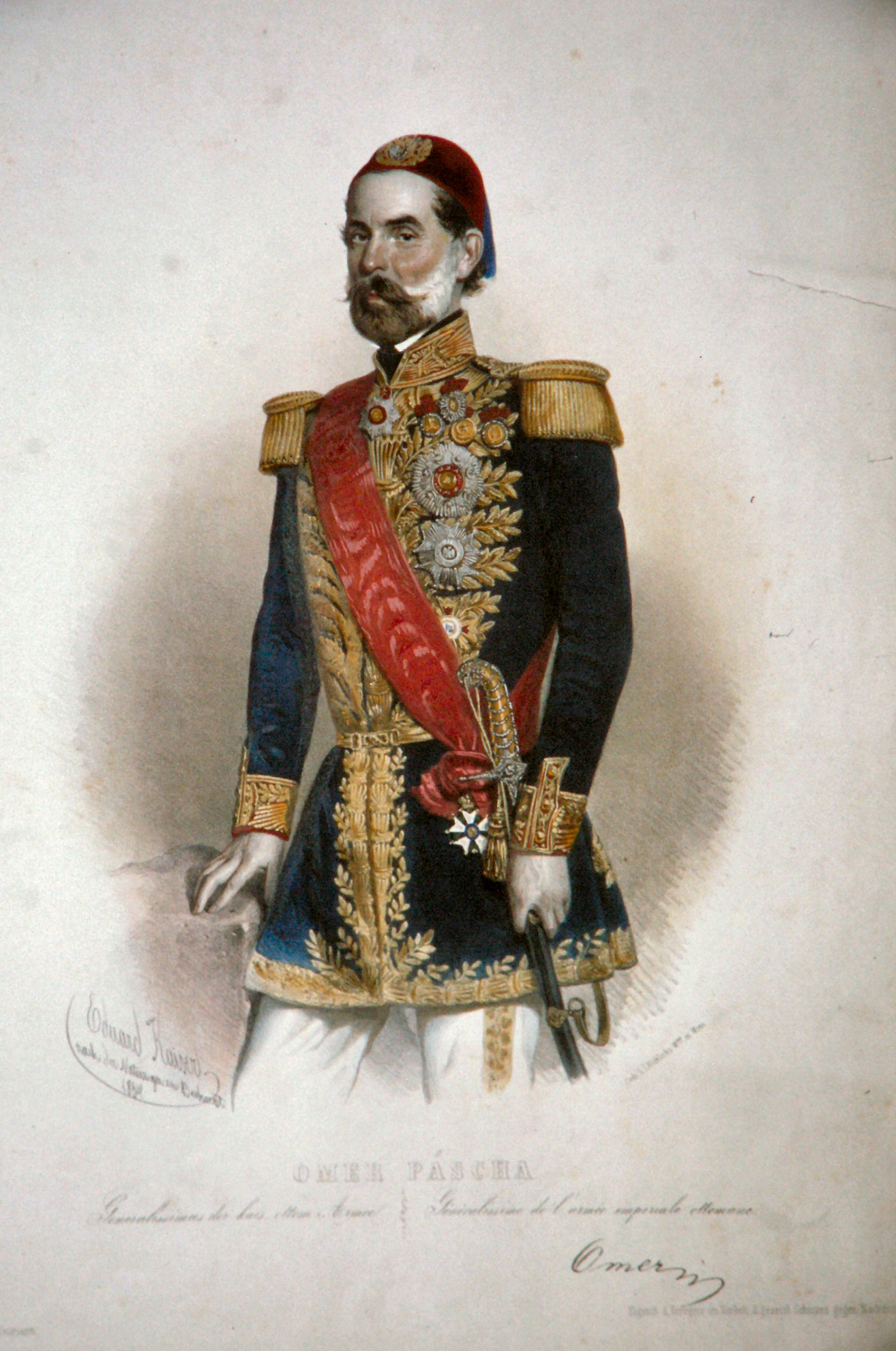
- Born: Mihajlo Latas / Михајло Латас; 24 September 1806; Janja Gora, Austrian Empire (now in Croatia)
- Died: 18 April 1871 (aged 64); Constantinople, Ottoman Empire
- Other name: Omar Pasha
- Spouse(s): Ida Hanım (divorced without issue); Adviye Hanım (with issue)
- Military career
- Allegiance: Austrian Empire (until 1823); Ottoman Empire (until 1871)
- Branch: Ottoman Army
- Service years: 1823–1869
- Rank: Field marshal (Mushir)
- Commands: Commander of Ottoman Forces in Moldavia & Wallachia
- Conflicts: Uprising of Dervish Cara; Albanian revolt of 1845; First Bedirkhanis Revolt; Wallachian Revolution of 1848; Crimean War; Battle of Oltenitza; Battle of Cetate; Battle of Eupatoria; Herzegovina uprising; Montenegrin–Ottoman War; Battle of Ostrog; Cretan revolt

Omer Pasha, also known as Omer Pasha Latas (Turkish: Ömer Lütfi Paşa, Serbian: Омер-паша Латас, romanized: Omer-paša Latas; 24 September 1806 – 18 April 1871) was an Ottoman field marshal and governor. Born in the Austrian Empire to Serbian Orthodox Christian parents, he initially served as an Austrian soldier. When faced with charges of embezzlement, he fled to Ottoman Bosnia in 1823 and converted to Islam. He then joined the Ottoman army, eventually rising to a position of command and serving as their broader strategic commander during the Crimean War, which saw Russia soundly defeated both diplomatically and military by a broad coalition of European powers. Latas was behind the Ottoman victories at Oltenița, Cetate, and Eupatoria.

== Early life ==
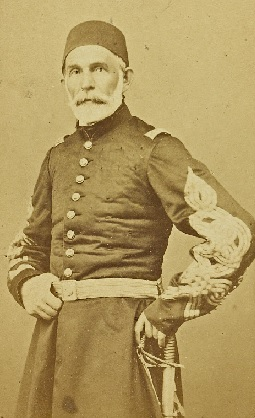
Omer Pasha

Omer Pasha was born Mihajlo Latas (Serbian: Михајло Латас), an ethnic Serb and Orthodox Christian, in Janja Gora, at the time part of the Croatian Military Frontier of the Austrian Empire (Modern Plaški, Lika, Croatia).

His father served in the Austrian Army and was appointed lieutenant-governor of the Ogulin district. His uncle was an Orthodox priest. He developed a passion for the military from a young age, and on leaving school in Gospić, attended military school in Zadar, later being accepted as a cadet in his father's regiment. In 1823, he was accused of stealing 180 florins from an Austrian military safe, prompting him to flee across the frontier to Bosnia Eyalet.

== Conversion and Ottoman Military Service ==
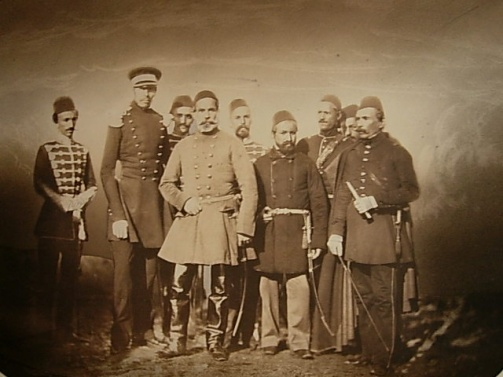
Omer Pasha with his officers 1854.

Some years after his escape to Bosnia, Latas was offered a position as tutor to the children of a Turkish merchant, on the condition that he converted to Islam and allowed himself to be circumcised. After his conversion, he took on the new name Omar Lufti. Eventually, he moved to Constantinople with the merchant's family, and, by leveraging his value as a former Austrian soldier, negotiated for himself a position as lecturer at the Imperial Ottoman Military Academy. After serving in this position for some time, he was enlisted as aide-de-camp to Wojciech Chrzanowski, who was engaged in the re-organization of the Ottoman Army after the defeat of the Janissaries.

In this role, he collaborated with Chrzanowski, who smoothed the way for his introduction into Ottoman high society. He thereby met and married Adviye Hanım, a daughter of Çerkes Hafız Mehmed Pasha, a political move which was integral to his rise in Ottoman military circles. He became writing-master to the Ottoman heir, Abd-ul-Medjid, and on the succession of the latter in 1839 was made a colonel. He was shortly afterwards appointed Military Governor of Constantinople. His only daughter, Saffet Hanım, married Mustafa Celalettin Pasha.

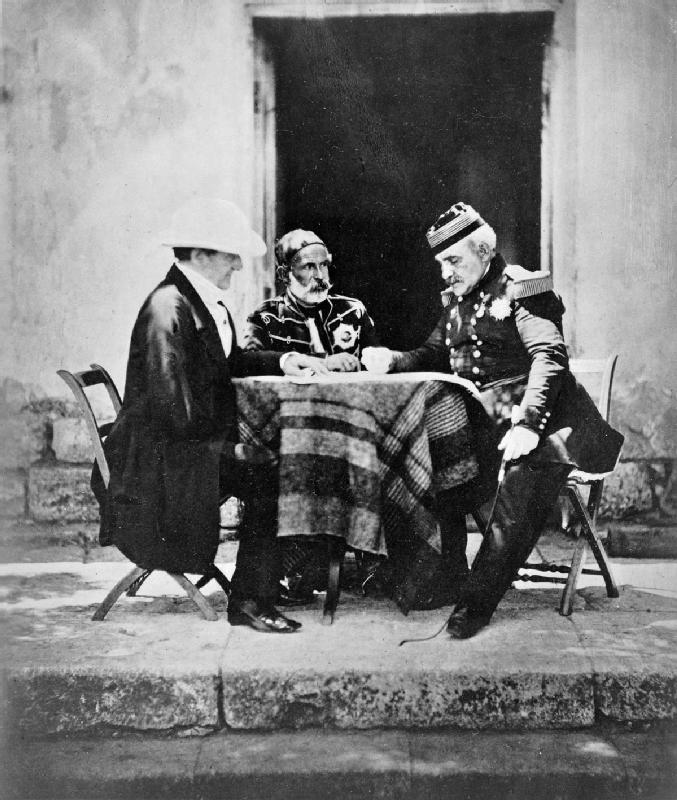
Lord Raglan, Omer Pasha and Marshal Pelissier during the Crimean War, 1854–1856, photographed by Roger Fenton.

In 1840-41 he led a successful expedition to quell a revolt in Syria, and in 1842 was made Governor of the Tripoli Eyalet (Lebanon). He was involved in the expedition to the Van Eyalet of the Ottoman Empire after the Massacres of Badr Khan in 1846, which saw him soundly defeated and the Emirate of Bohtan brought under direct Ottoman control. Some time following the Hungarian Revolution of 1848, Omar Pasha was given command of the Ottoman forces in Moldavia and Wallachia.

There followed his command in Bosnia against Ali-paša Rizvanbegović, who had revolted against the Ottomans and begun to build up an independent power base. Omar commanded from his headquarters during this campaign, marking the beginning of his shift from frontline combat to broader strategic coordination. The campaign saw the respected historical aristocracy of the Muslim faith executed, plundered, and deposed in the interest of centralising Ottoman power in the region. As the Governor of Bosnia, he ordered Ottoman forces in the region to invade the neighbouring Montenegro, a diplomatic blunter which led to Austrian intervention and the withdrawal of the Ottoman representative in Vienna.

== The Crimean War ==
Oriental Army of the Crimean campaign by Gustav Bartsch. From left to right: Admiral Ferdinand-Alphonse Hamelin, Lord Lucan, Lord Raglan, Admiral Dundas, Sir John Campbell, Duke of Cambridge, Lord Cardigan, Ismail Pasha, Omer Pasha, Muhlis Pasha (Grigore Sturdza), Sultan Abdülmecid I, Said-Bey (Vasile Obedeanu), Ahmed Pasha, col. Desmaret, Marshal Baraguey d'Hilliers, Prince Napoleon, col. Trochu, Marshal de Saint-Arnaud, general Bosquet, general de Canrobert

When the Crimean War broke out in 1853, his services were rendered as broader strategic commander for the Ottoman forces in the region. In 1853 he successfully led defenses during the Siege of Calafat. Soon after, he defeated a numerically superior Russian force under the indecisive and incompetent Russian General Peter Dannenberg at the Battle of Oltenița.

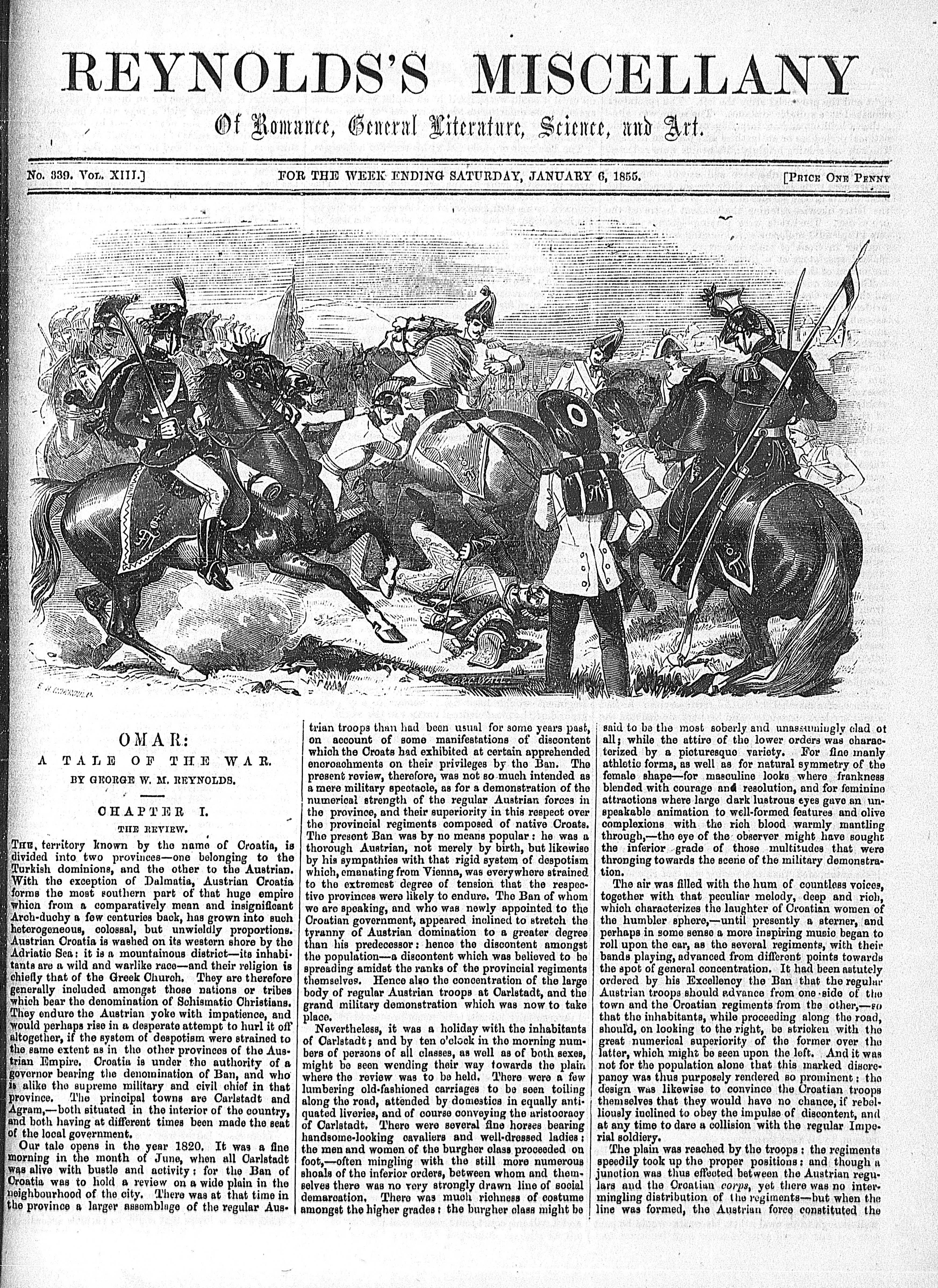
Omar, a Tale of the War, a novel by George W. M. Reynolds published in Reynolds's Miscellany (1855).

In January 1854 he successfully persuaded Lord Raglan to keep his word by reinforcing Varna, while the French remained deeply skeptical of Omar's strategy to protect the Turkish army's flank on the Lower Danube. His firm management of the British in Constantinople helped to stabilise the front in Crimea after January 1855, when finally transports arrived to ferry Turkish troops to Crimea. On 17 February 1855, he faced off against roughly Russian troops under the command of Russian Lieutenant-General Stepan Khrulev during the Battle of Eupatoria. This was widely seen as a strategic blunder, although relatively minor.

Following this, he took a backseat during the war, mainly overseeing Ottoman positions, coordinating fortifications, and managing troop deployments.

Although he had a reputation as a strict and ruthless disciplinarian, he was revered and respected by his men

== Sources ==
- Figes, Orlando (2010). "The Crimean War: A History". Metropolitan Books. ISBN 9780805074604. Published in the UK as "Crimea: The Last Crusade".
- Muradbegović, Ahmed (1944). "Omer-paša Latas u Bosni, 1850-1852". 42. Matica hrvatska.
- Laurence Oliphant (1856). The Trans-Caucasian campaign of the Turkish army under Omer Pasha: a personal narrative. W. Blackwood and sons.
- Bessé, Alfred; Morris, Edward Joy (1855). The Turkish empire, embracing the religion, manners and customs of the people, with a memoir of the reigning sultan and Omer Pacha. s.n.
- Sweetman, John (2001). The Crimean War: 1854-1856. Osprey Publishing. ISBN 9781841761862.
- The Ottoman Empire and Its Successors, 1801-1927. CUP Archive.
- Ćirković, Sima M. (2004). The Serbs. Wiley-Blackwell. p. 222. ISBN 0-631-20471-7.
- Chambers's biographical dictionary: the great of all times and nations by David Patrick, Francis Hindes Groome; W. & R. Chambers, limited, 1907 page 706
- The Near East in Modern Times: The Ottoman Empire and the Balkan States to 1900, by G. G. Arnakis, Wayne S. Vucinich; Pemberton Press, 1969 pages 207, 345
- Wars and Peace Treaties, 1816-1991 by Erik Goldstein; Routledge, 1992 page 24
- The encyclopedia of nineteenth-century land warfare: an illustrated world view by Byron Farwell; W. W. Norton & Company, 2001 page 613
- The Balkan Economies C. 1800-1914: Evolution Without Development by Michael R. Palairet; Contributors: Charles Feinstein, Patrick O'Brien, Barry Supple, Peter Temin, Gianni Toniolo; Cambridge University Press, 2004 page 133
- Religious separation and political intolerance in Bosnia-Herzegovina by Mitja Velikonja; Texas A&M University Press, 2003 pages 85–86
- History of the Balkans: Eighteenth and nineteenth centuries by Barbara Jelavich; Cambridge University Press, 1983 page 345
- An Ethnohistorical Dictionary of the Russian and Soviet Empires by James S. Olson, Lee Brigance Pappas, and Nicholas C.J. Pappas; Greenwood Press (March 30, 1994) page 8
- The Druzes And The Maronites Under The Turkish Rule From 1840 To 1860 by Charles Henry Churchill; Kessinger Publishing (June 30, 2004) pages 64, 72–74,77-79
- A military history of modern Egypt: from the Ottoman Conquest to the Ramadan War by Andrew James; Greenwood Publishing Group, 2006 p121-122
- The Turkish Empire; Its Historical, Statistical, and Religious Condition: Also Its Manners, Customs, Etc. by Alfred de Bessé, Edward Joy Morris, Contributors: John Fagan and Thomas S. Sinclair; Lindsay & Blakiston, 1854 pages 24–27
- Murdock, Harold; Fiske, John (1889). The Reconstruction of Europe: A Sketch of the Diplomatic and Military History of Continental Europe, from the Rise to the Fall of the Second French Empire. Houghton, Mifflin and Company.
