= James Marsh (British Army officer) =

General James Marsh
- Died: 12 June 1804
- Military career
- Allegiance: United Kingdom
- Branch: British Army
- Rank: General
- Conflicts: American Revolutionary War

General James Marsh (died 12 June 1804) was a British Army officer.

== Military career ==
Marsh commanded the 43rd Regiment of Foot at Rhode Island in 1776 during the American Revolutionary War. He remained in that post until October 1787 when he was asked to raise the 77th (Hindoostan) Regiment of Foot. He was promoted to major-general on 18 October 1793, to lieutenant-general on 9 January 1798 and to full general on 25 September 1803.

He served as colonel of the 77th Regiment of Foot from 1787 until his death in 1804.

Military offices
Preceded by New Post	Colonel of the 77th (Hindoostan) Regiment of Foot; 1787–1804	Succeeded by Albemarle Bertie, 9th Earl of Lindsey
