= Swaran =

Swaran may refer to:

- Swaran Ram Darapuri, Indian social activist
- Swaran Lata (disambiguation)
  - Swaran Lata (actress), Pakistani film actress
  - Swaran Lata (singer), Indian singer of Punjabi music
- Ajit Swaran Singh, New Zealand judge
- Swaran Singh, Indian politician

== See also ==
- Savarna (disambiguation)
