= Montenegrin–Ottoman War (1861–1862) =

Date	1861–1862
Location	Montenegro and Herzegovina (Ottoman Empire)
Result	Ottoman victory, Convention of Scutari

Belligerents
Principality of Montenegro	Ottoman Empire

Commanders and leaders
Nikola I Petrović-Njegoš; Mirko Petrović-Njegoš	Omar Pasha

Strength
Unknown	50,000

The Montenegrin–Ottoman War (1861–1862) was a war between the Principality of Montenegro and the Ottoman Empire that took place between 1861 and 1862. The war ended and Montenegro had to acknowledge Ottoman suzerainty.

In 1861 Montenegro encouraged a revolt in Herzegovina by their ethnic kinsmen. Ottoman forces under Omar Pasha were first defeated but eventually prevailed. The Montenegrins were pressed by the Great Powers and withheld their forces from fighting in Herzegovina. The Ottoman army then invaded Montenegro. After the unsuccessful defense of Ostrog Monastery by Mirko Petrović, the Montenegrins were defeated.

The war ended with the Convention of Scutari of August 31, 1862. Montenegro was forced to acknowledge Ottoman suzerainty, however the terms were generous because the Ottomans wanted to win Montenegrin goodwill. The borders of 1859 were restored, the Montenegrins were allowed to import any goods, except arms, through Ottoman territory and to rent agricultural lands.

== Battles fought ==
- Battle of Ostrog
