= Battle of Oltenița =

1853 battle of the Crimean War

Coordinates: 44°5′12″N 26°38′12″E

- Part of the Crimean War
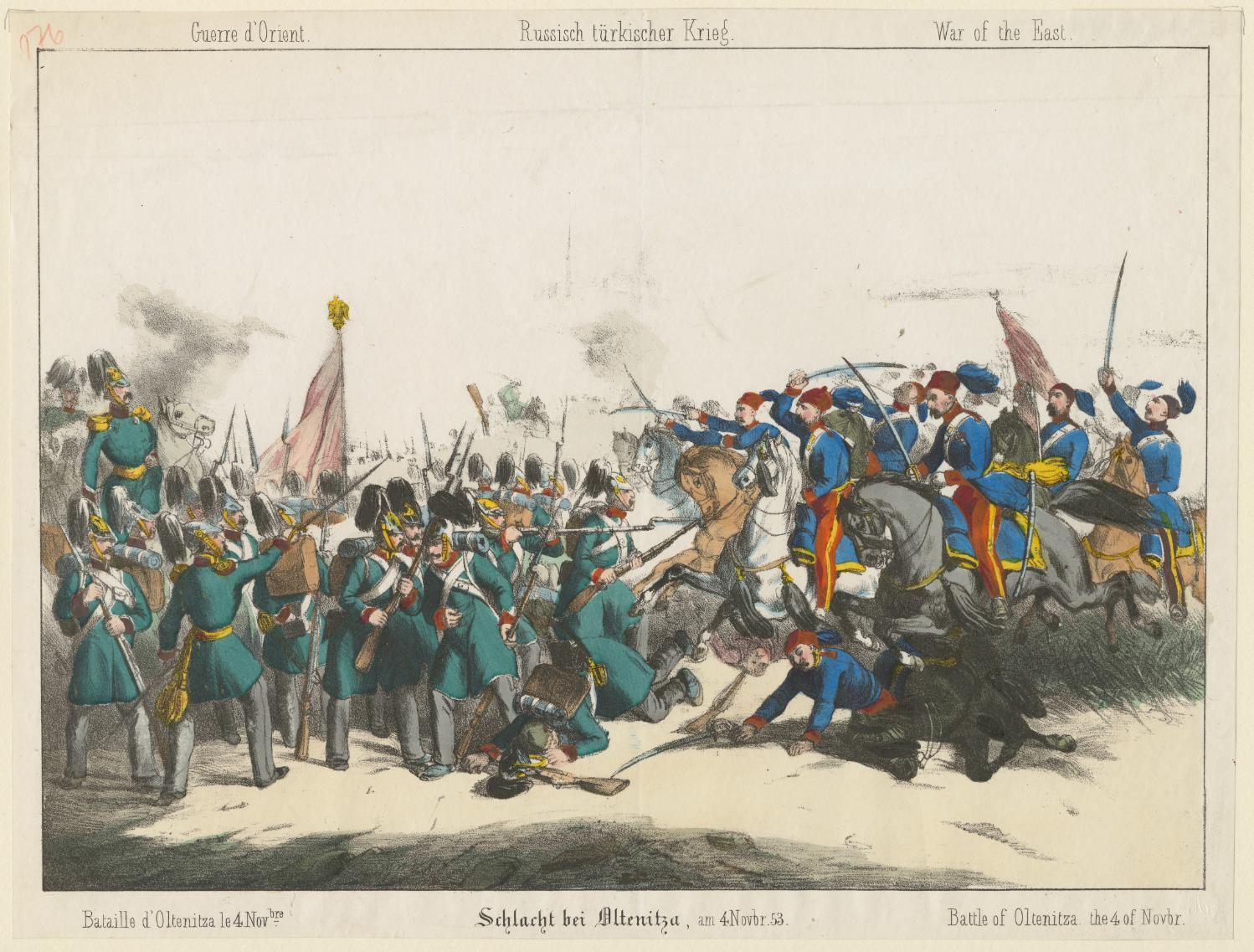
| Date | 4 November 1853 |
| Location | Oltenița, Wallachia |
| Result | Ottoman victory |

Belligerents
| Ottoman Empire | Russian Empire |

Commanders and leaders
| Omer Pasha | Peter Dannenberg |

Strength
| 5 companies of infantry, 150 cavalrymen, 6 guns Russian estimate: 8,000 with 20 guns | 8 battalions of infantry, 9 squadrons of cavalry In total, about 6,000 |

Casualties and losses
| 30 dead 150 wounded | 600–700 killed 3,000–4,000 wounded 90 to 236 dead 718 to 725 wounded |

The Battle of Oltenița (or Oltenitza) was fought on 4 November 1853 and was the first engagement of the Crimean War. In this battle an Ottoman army under the command of Omar Pasha was defending its fortified positions from the Russian forces led by General Peter Dannenberg, until the Russians were ordered to withdraw. The Russian attack was called off just when they reached the Ottoman fortifications, and they retreated in good order, but suffered heavy losses. The Turks held their positions, but did not pursue the enemy, and later retreated to the other side of Danube.

== Background ==
This battle took place during the Crimean War. In the build-up to war, Russia had occupied the Danubian Principalities of Moldavia and Wallachia, positioning troops on the (northern) left bank of the Danube, the border of Ottoman territory. The Ottoman Empire had responded by moving troops under the general command of Omar Pasha to the right bank to face them. On their left flank, the Ottomans gathered a large force near the westernmost fortress of Vidin, but there were no significant numbers of Russians (they were afraid of diplomatic attrition with Austria). In the centre, Russian forces south of Bucharest were faced by Ottoman forces in the fortresses of Ruse, Turtukai and Silistra. Following the Ottoman ultimatum on 4 October 1853 to withdraw within 2 weeks, Ottoman forces under Ferik Ismail Pasha crossed the Danube River from Vidin to Kalafat on 28 October 1853 to drive the Russians out of the western part of Wallachia. On 30 October Omar Pasha himself arrived at the troops gathered near the Turtukai fortress.

== Action ==
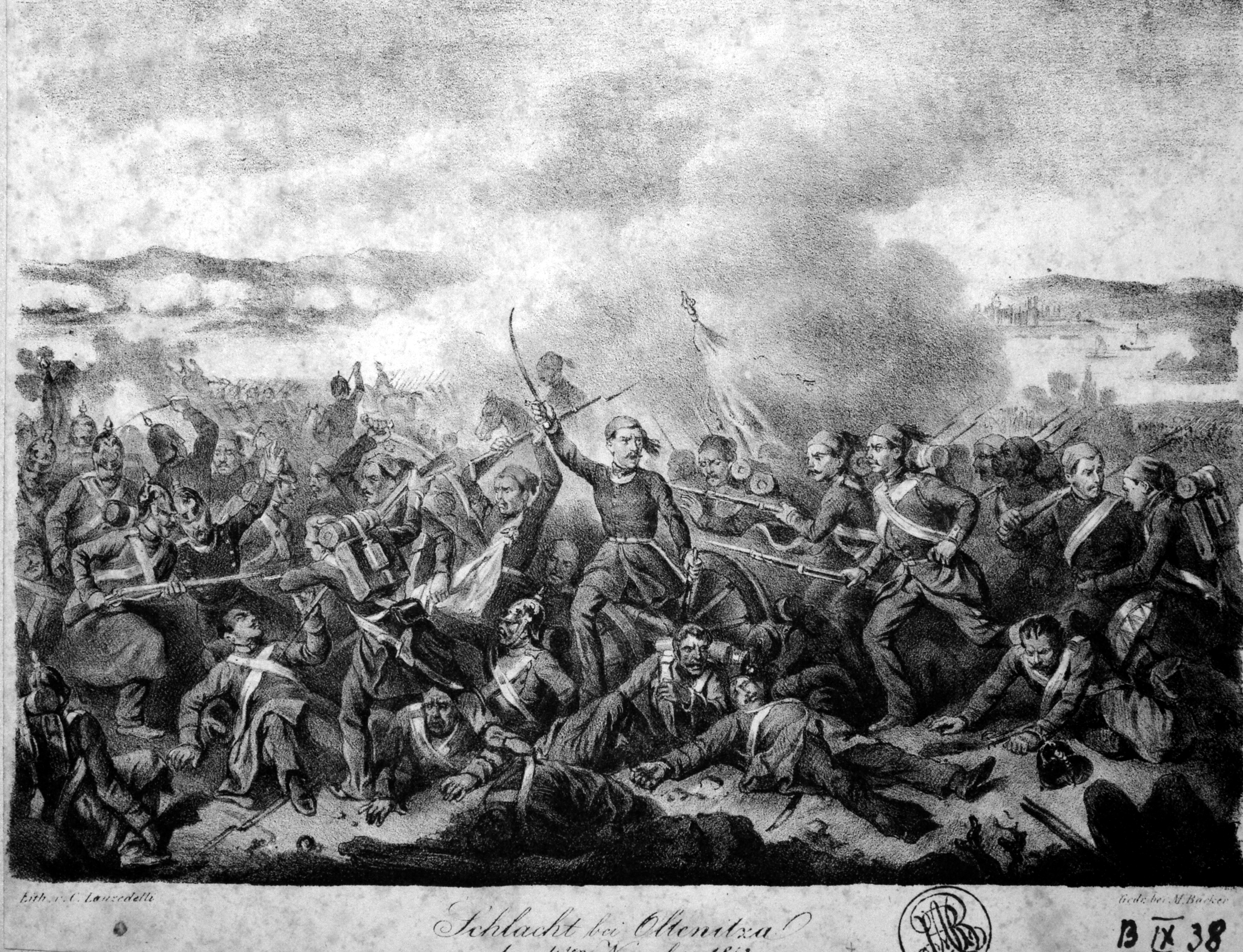
Battle of Oltenița by Karl Lanzedelli

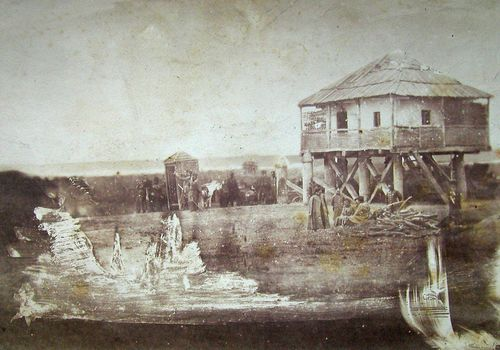
The Oltenița Quarantine in 1854, photograph by Carol Szathmari

On 2 November 1853 the vanguard of an Ottoman force under Omar Pasha crossed the Danube in eastern Wallachia and occupied the fortified quarantine post near the village of Oltenița, opposite the Turtukai fortress. First, one battalion of the Ottomans crossed over, followed by another; they managed to carry out some fortification work. According to the report of Omar Pasha, there were three companies of ordinary infantry and two companies of riflemen, as well as 150 horsemen and 6 cannons on the bridgehead. Several batteries of artillery were placed on the right (Ottoman) bank of the Danube, as well as on the island near the quarantine. Omar Pasha himself remained in Turtukai during the battle. On 4 November, Russian troops under the command of General Dannenberg attacked the fortified positions of the Ottomans. Russians had 8 battalions of infantry and 9 squadrons of cavalry (about 6000 people in total). At first, for two hours, Russian artillery (16 guns) fired, gradually shifting positions closer and closer to the Ottoman line of defense. Then, deciding that the return fire was already sufficiently weakened, the Russians moved all their infantry into the attack. The infantry moved in dense battalion columns, under the fierce fire of Turkish riflemen and guns, and suffered heavy losses. The attackers advanced to the moat, but there they were ordered to retreat, having lost about 970 men in total.

Their failure was seen as the result of a smaller number of troops, poor reconnaissance and insufficient artillery support, which failed to neutralise the strongest enemy defense, and an order to withdraw that was issued at the time when the Russian troops were already successfully storming the enemy positions. Emperor Nicholas I, after having studied the battle in detail, commented that the troops of Dannenberg did not have enough artillery to drive the Ottomans from their defensive positions and suppress the fortified Ottoman cannons, which were supported by other artillery positions built on the right shore of the Danube, and should have fought in a looser formation, using marksmen against the embrasures of the enemy fortifications. Dannenberg himself justified his order to retreat for the following reason: by entering the Turkish positions, his troops would be vulnerable to Turkish artillery fire from the other side of the Danube. But this explanation was unsatisfactory, because it is not clear why the infantry attack was made at all in this case.

Omar Pasha officially declared that he lost about 180; the Russians, although they did not know the actual losses of the enemy, assumed that they should be heavy, largely due to the massive use of shrapnel at close range. In total, the Russians lost between 90 and 236 killed and 724 wounded according to Russian sources. The official medical report recorded 718 wounded, of which 31 died.

According to Radu Rosetti, prince Grigore Sturdza, who enlisted in the Ottoman Army under the name of Muhlis (later becoming a Brigadier General under the name of Muhlis Pasha), played an important role in defeating the Russians, distinguishing himself in the battle.

== Aftermath ==
The battle of Oltenitza was the first military engagement of the Crimean War. It resulted in a tactical victory for the Ottoman forces, in that the Russians withdrew, and the Ottoman forces were left in possession of the bridgehead on the left bank of the Danube. However, the Ottomans did not pursue the Russians. Later, the Russian command pulled up additional forces to Oltenitza and the Ottomans left for the right bank to their start position. The battle was exaggerated in the European press as a great Ottoman triumph, but strategically it had little impact, and Western newspapers were confused by the Ottoman retreat that followed. Nevertheless, Russian pride was certainly stung, and the Ottomans were encouraged by their first serious victory.

== See also ==
- Battle of Cetate
- Siege of Calafat
- Siege of Silistra
