= Swaran Ram Darapuri =

Indian police officer, social activist and politician (born 1943)

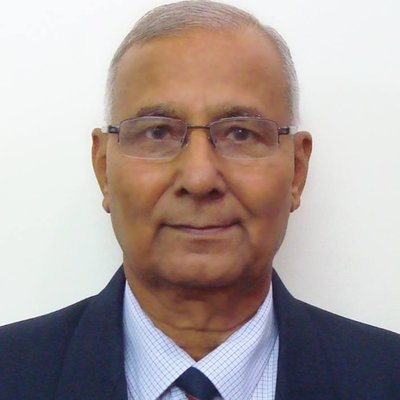

Inspector General of Police Uttar Pradesh

Personal details
- Born: 16 December 1943 (age 82) Darapur, Jalandhar, Punjab, India
- Party: All India People's Front
- Education: Ramgharia College, Phagwara (Punjab)
- Occupation: Indian Police Service, Social Activist and Politician.
- Website: www.dalitliberation.blogspot.com, dalitmukti.blogspot.com

Sarwan Ram Darapuri (born 1943) is an Indian social activist, politician and ex-IPS officer. He served as the third-highest-ranking police officer in Uttar Pradesh.

== Early life ==
Darapuri was born on 16 December 1943 at Darapur village in Jalandhar District of Punjab. His father's name is Naranjan Ram. Darapuri is an Ambedkarite and also converted into Buddhism on 14 October 1995. He completed his Bachelor of Sciences from the Ramgharia College, Phagwara (Punjab) in 1964.

He worked as a science lecturer in Punjab, District Organiser of National Savings Organisation (GOI), Assistant in Ministry of Finance (GOI), New Delhi and the Customs Appraiser in Customs Department (GOI) at Bombay.

== Civil service ==
He is an Indian Police Services officer from 1972 batch of Uttar Pradesh. He became Inspector General of Police in Uttar Pradesh. Darapuri was last posted at Armed Training Centre, Sitapur and retired on 31 December 2003.

== Politics ==
He was State Coordinator of Lok Rajniti Manch of U.P and the Member of Coordination Committee for Jan Sangharsh Morcha. He is National Secretary and the National President of All India People's Front (Radical).

He contested in 2009 Indian General elections of Lok Sabha from Lucknow constituency and in 2014 Indian general elections he contested from the Robertsganj constituency but lost at both times.

He criticised and questioned the role of the police after inspector Subodh Singh was killed in the 2019 Bulandshahr violence and 2018 Kasganj violence.

== Social service ==
Darapuri is Vice President of People's Union for Civil Liberties in U.P, expert advisor for National Commission for Scheduled Castes, RTI Campaign committee member of U.P and the convener of Dalit Mukti Morcha. Also a convener of the World Conference on Religion and Peace (Lucknow branch) and President of Society for Promoting Buddhist Knowledge.

Darapuri was arrested in 2017 for protesting against Yogi Adityanath in Uttar Pradesh. In 2019 he was again arrested in anti CAA protests at Uttar Pradesh and kept in house arrest and released after few days.
