= Thomas Reeves (VC) =

Recipient of the Victoria Cross

- Born: 1828; Portsmouth, Hampshire
- Died: 4 August 1862 (aged 33–34); Portsea, Hampshire
- Burial place: International Ferry Port, Portsea
- Military career
- Allegiance: United Kingdom
- Branch: Royal Navy
- Service years: 1846–1860
- Rank: Captain of the Foretop
- Conflicts: Crimean War
- Awards: Victoria Cross

Thomas Reeves VC (1828 – 4 August 1862) was an English recipient of the Victoria Cross, the highest and most prestigious award for gallantry in the face of the enemy that can be awarded to British and Commonwealth forces.

== Details ==
Reeves was approximately 26 years old, and a seaman in the Royal Navy serving with the Naval Brigade during the Crimean War when the following deed took place for which he was awarded the VC:

On 5 November 1854 at the Battle of Inkerman, Crimean Peninsula, when the Right Lancaster Battery was attacked and many of the soldiers were wounded, Seaman Reeves, with two other seamen (James Gorman and Mark Scholefield) and two others who were killed during the action, mounted the defence work banquette and, under withering attack from the enemy, kept up a rapid, repulsing fire. Their muskets were re-loaded for them by the wounded soldiers under the parapet and eventually the enemy fell back and gave no more trouble.

He later achieved the rank of captain of the foretop and died of consumption in August 1862. His VC is on display in the Lord Ashcroft Gallery at the Imperial War Museum, London.
