= Peter Dannenberg (general) =

Russian general (1792–1872)

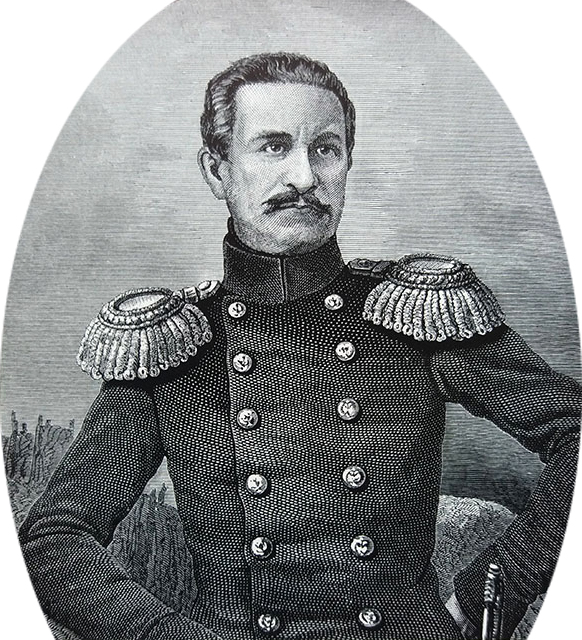
- Born: Peter Andreyevich Dannenberg; 9 June 1792; Olonets Governorate, Russian Empire
- Died: 6 August 1872 (aged 80); Russian Empire
- Military career
- Allegiance: Russian Empire
- Branch: Imperial Russian Army
- Service years: 1812–1866
- Rank: General of the Infantry
- Conflicts: Napoleonic Wars; French invasion of Russia; Battle of Smolensk; Battle of Borodino; Battle of Tarutino; Battle of Maloyaroslavets; Battle of Krasnoi; War of the Sixth Coalition; German campaign; Battle of Lützen; Battle of Dresden; Battle of Kulm; Battle of Leipzig; Campaign of France; Battle of Brienne; Battle of Arcis-sur-Aube; Battle of Fère-Champenoise; Battle of Paris; November Uprising; Hungarian Campaign; Crimean War; Battle of Oltenița; Battle of Inkerman
- Awards: Order of St. Vladimir; Kulm Cross; Order of St. Anne; Order of St. George

Peter Andreyevich Dannenberg (Russian: Пётр Андреевич Данненберг; 9 June 1792 – 6 August 1872) was a Russian general, particularly notable for his command during the Crimean War.

== Early life ==
Born into a reformed church family on 19 June 1792 in Olonets Governorate, his early education was at the Sofia Institute of Forestry (1807–1810), from which he moved to the Imperial Forestry Institute in Saint Petersburg, from which he graduated in 1811, from the scientist and surveyor course, with the rank of 13th grade. On graduation he became a secretary-policeman but that same year decided to switch to military service and so enrolled in the Kolonnovozhatyh College. He successfully completed their science course and on 26 January 1812 was promoted to the rank of ensign in a quartermaster unit and a secondment to the 24th Infantry Division.

== Career ==
=== Napoleonic Wars ===
In his twenties he fought the French invasion of Russia, seeing action at Smolensk on 12 June 1812, Borodino on 26 August, Tarutino on 6 October and Maloyaroslavets on 12 October. For his actions at Maloyaroslavets he was awarded the Order of Saint Vladimir 4th class, with swords and bow and finally, from 3 to 10 November, at Krasnoi. For his bravery, he was promoted to second lieutenant on 4 December 1812.

As the Russians advanced into Germany, he fought at Lützen on 20 April 1813, on 16 August near Dresden, on 17 and 18 August at Kulm (for which he received the Kulm Cross) and then 4 and 6 October near Leipzig. Whilst in the reserves in 1814, he also fought at Brienne, Arcis-sur-Aube, Fère-Champenoise, at a skirmish near Paris on 18 March and finally in the capture of Paris on 19 March. Grand Duke Konstantin Pavlovich appointed him to his personal staff and Dannenberg also received promotions to lieutenant and captain along with the Order of St Anne 2nd class. On 1 August 1814 he was transferred to the General Staff of the Guards. He was then promoted to colonel (1818) and Major-General (1827) with the appointment of Quartermaster-General Chief of Staff to the Tsarevich.

=== Crimean War ===
During the Crimean War, Dannenberg was given command of Russian troops on the Danube front where he lost the Battle of Oltenița. When the fighting moved to the Crimea, he was given command of part of the Russian forces there. He commanded the Russian 4th Corps which unsuccessfully assaulted the British positions during the Battle of Inkerman. Dannenburg ordered the general retreat after the Russian side suffered around 12,000 casualties, including divisional general Soimonov.

== Death ==
Dannenberg died on 6 August 1872.

== Awards ==
- Order of St. Vladimir 4th class (1812), 1st class (1862)
- Kulm Cross (1813)
- Order of St. Anne 2nd class (1814), 1st class (1831)
- Order of St. George 4th class (1839)
