= All India People's Front (Radical) =

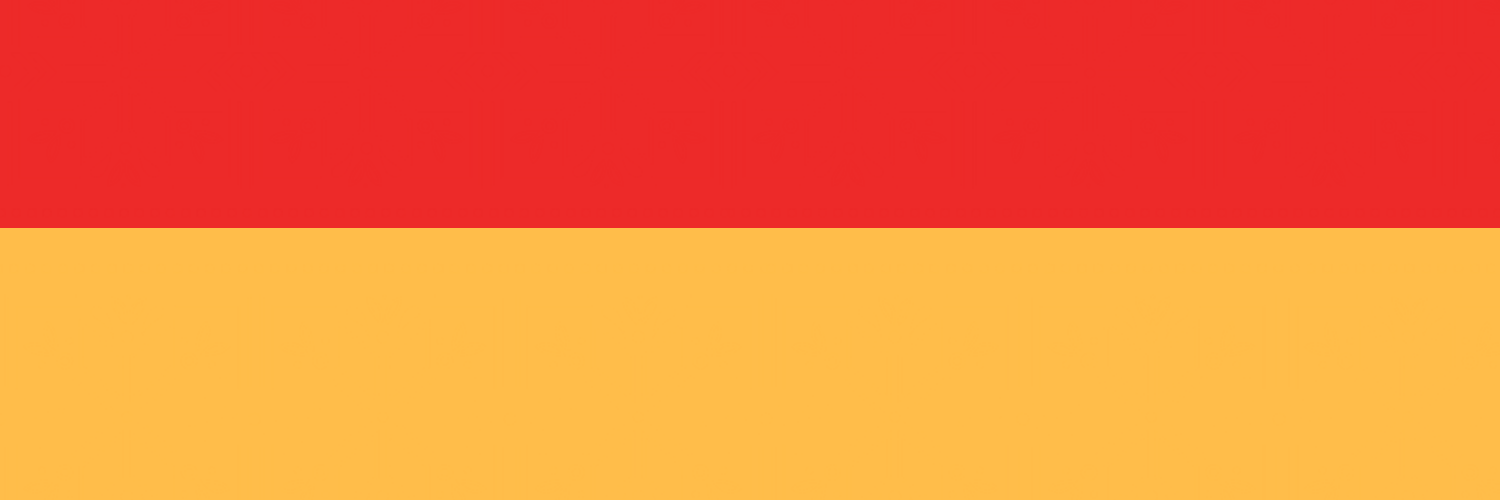
- Abbreviation: AIPF
- Founder: Akhilendra Pratap Singh
- ECI Status: State Party
- Seats in Rajya Sabha: 0 / 245
- Seats in Lok Sabha: 0 / 543
- Seats in State Legislative Assemblies: 0 / 4,033
- Seats in State Legislative Councils: 0 / 426

The All India People's Front (abbreviated as AIPF-R) is an Indian political party, based in the state of Bihar & Uttar Pradesh.

== National Spokesperson ==
SR Darapuri -National President- SR Darapuri
