= Latika Nath =

Indian author and wildlife conservationist

- Education: Christ Church, Oxford
- Occupations: Wildlife photographer & conservationist, author
- Writing career
- Genre: Photography
- Notable works: Omo- Where time stood still, Hidden India, Takdir The Tiger Club, Wild Things, A Tiger's Tale, A Tale of Two Tigers
- Notable awards: Karamveer Puraskar; Awarded with the title of "Tiger Princess of India" by National Geographic

Latika Nath is an Indian author, photographer and wildlife conservationist.

== Early life and education ==
Latika Nath was born to Professor Lalit M Nath and Meera Nath. Lalit Nath is ex-director AIIMS and was on the Indian Board of Wildlife and responsible for setting up the animal conservation movement in India in the 1970s. She spent much of her childhood visiting wilderness areas with her parents. Latika Nath graduated in environmental science from the University of Delhi and was awarded a Chevening Award by The British Council to complete a master's degree in rural resource management from the University College of North Wales, Bangor, UK. She then obtained her D.Phil. under the guidance of Prof. David Macdonald at the Wildlife Conservation Research Unit (WildCRU), Department of Zoology, Christ Church, Oxford. She was awarded a Research Fellowship at the Wildlife Institute of India and worked on Human-Elephant conflict resolution issues.

== Career ==
Latika Nath began as an academic and has consulted on environmental and wildlife issues for national and international organisations including IUCN, UNDP, UNFPA and ICIMOD. Nath has traveled the world to photograph various animal species (tigers, lions, cheetahs, jaguars, snow leopards, clouded leopards, Asian Elephant, the Gangetic Dolphin, the arna or wild water buffalo (Bubalus arnee)) and worked for their conservation. She subsequently worked with tribal communities to resolve human-wildlife conflicts.

She has received multiple awards and honorary titles, including “Tiger Princess of India” by National Geographic.

== Notable works ==
=== Publications and films ===
- Omo- Where time stood still – 2019. Limited Editions. Academic Foundation. ISBN 9789332704985
- Nath Latika & Nath Shloka. Hidden India 2018 – a journey to where the wild things are. Limited Editions. Academic Foundation. ISBN 9789332704626
- Rana, Latika Nath 2005 Takdir the Tiger Cub. Tulika Books. ISBN 8181460618
- Rana, LN 2005. Report on the status of large mammalian species and identification of biological corridors in the Khangchenjunga Conservation Landscape. ICIMOD, Nepal
- Rana LN 2002. Conservation of Wetland Fauna in Nepal. Proceedings of the River Symposium 2002, Brisbane, Australia.
- C. Carbone1, S. Christie, K. Conforti, T. Coulson, N. Franklin, J. R. Ginsberg, M. Griffiths, J. Holden, M. Kinnaird, R. Laidlaw, A. Lynam, D. W. MacDonald, D. Martyr, C. McDougal, L. Nath, T. O'Brien, J. Seidensticker, J. L. D. Smith, R. Tilson and W. N. Wan Shahruddin .(2000) The use of photographic rates to estimate densities of cryptic mammals: response to Jennelle et al.. Anim. Conserv. 5: 121–123.
- Latika Rana – Tiger Princess of India. National Geographic Television.

=== Contributions ===
- Remembering Great Apes – 2018. Margot Raggett. Wildlife Photographers United. ISBN 978-1999643300
- Macdonald, David 2001 The New Encyclopaedia of Mammals. Oxford University Press. ISBN 0198508239
- Riding the Tiger: Tiger Conservation in Human-Dominated Landscapes. 1999. Seidensticker J, Christie S and Jackson P. ISBN 9780521648356
- National Geographic. December 1997. Vol. 192. No 6. Wild Tigers
- A Tiger's Tale. BBC Wildlife
- Wild Things – Latika Nath ( Discovery Channel)
- A Tale of Two Tigers. BBC Wildlife

=== Exhibitions ===
- Omo – where time stood still. The Bikaner House, New Delhi. 5–12 November 2018
- Omo – a preview. The Corridor Project @The Quorum Club, Gurugram, Delhi NCR. 6 November – 6 December 2018.
- Participated in a Group Show – An Eye on the Tiger, The World's Largest Tiger Photography Exhibition by the World's best Wildlife Photographers. The Royal Albert Hall, 18 September – 14 October 2018
- Participated in a Group Show – Remembering Great Apes. La Galleria, Pall Mall, London, United Kingdom. 15–27 October 2018

== Awards, honors, grants and titles ==
- Grant from Save the Tiger Fund for Camera Trap Development 1998–1999
- Overseas Research Student Scholarship
- Oxford and Cambridge Society of India Scholarship
- Foreign and Commonwealth Office Scholarship for the Year (Chevening Award)
- Research Fellowship, Wildlife Institute of India, Dehra dun, 1994 – 1997
- Karmaveer Puraskaar for Work in the field of Environment and Conservation
- Award from ATOI for contribution to Ecotourism in India 2007. National Geographic featured Latika in an hour long program called "Latika Rana – Tiger Princess" for a series titled "True Originals (USA)" and "Truth Files (Worldwide)"
- Latika was part of the campaign to launch National Geographic Channel in India along with Gerry Martin and Hritikh Roshan
- TEDxGurgaon 2012 Born to be Wild.
- TEDxSIULavale 2019. Tiger Conservation and more
