= Thomas C. Reeves (educational technologist) =

Thomas C. Reeves is an American educational technologist who is professor emeritus of learning, design, and technology at the University of Georgia in Athens, Georgia. His research has focused on educational design research and authentic learning in online environments.

== Early life and education ==
Reeves served as a chaplain's assistant in the United States Army from 1969 to 1971. He earned a Bachelor of Science degree in elementary education from Georgia State University in 1973 and then worked as an elementary school teacher in DeKalb County, Georgia, from 1973 to 1974. He went on to Syracuse University, where he received a Master of Science in instructional technology in 1975 and a PhD in instructional design, development and evaluation in 1979. He also earned a master's degree in library media from Georgia State University in 1976.

== Career ==
At Syracuse, Reeves was an instructor and graduate research assistant from 1974 to 1977 and an associate in evaluation from 1975 to 1979. In 1979 and 1980, he was a Fulbright lecturer at the National Technical University in Piura, Peru. He then worked as an evaluation specialist at the Medical University of South Carolina in Charleston from 1980 to 1981. From 1981 to 1982, he directed the STARS Project at University of Maryland University College, which built a videodisc system for functional literacy training in the U.S. Army in Europe.

In 1982, Reeves joined the faculty of the University of Georgia (UGA) as an assistant professor of elementary education. From 1984 to 1985, he was a senior instructional scientist at MetaMedia Systems in Germantown, Maryland, where he worked on interactive videodisc systems used in medical education and military training. He returned to UGA in 1985 as an assistant professor of learning, design, and technology, and was promoted to associate professor in 1989 and to professor in 1994. At UGA, he co-founded the Learning and Performance Support Laboratory in the College of Education. UGA made him professor emeritus in 2010. In March 2010, he was honored for his work at a conference on educational design research held at the university's Paul D. Coverdell Center.

In 2005, the University of Canberra in Australia chose Reeves as its first annual Learning and Teaching Scholar. In 2011, Open Universities Australia appointed him the first visiting scholar of its newly founded Centre for Online Learning Excellence, to work on online learning quality standards.

From 1988 to 1989, Reeves presided over the Association for the Development of Computer-based Instructional Systems. Between 1997 and 2000, he edited the Journal of Interactive Learning Research, and from 1997 to 2017 he was a contributing editor of the magazine Educational Technology. He has been a consulting editor for the research and development sections of Educational Technology Research and Development since 1993. He is also a member of the Association for Educational Communications and Technology (AECT).

== Research ==
Reeves's research interests include interactive multimedia, educational design research, mental models and the evaluation of instructional technology. Throughout his career, Reeves has advocated for research that is socially responsible.

== Bibliography ==
=== Books ===
- Reeves, Thomas C.; Hedberg, John G. (2003). Interactive Learning Systems Evaluation. Educational Technology Publications.
- Herrington, Jan; Reeves, Thomas C.; Oliver, Ron (2010). A Guide to Authentic e-Learning. Connecting with e-Learning. Routledge. ISBN 978-0-415-99800-0.
- McKenney, Susan; Reeves, Thomas C. (2012). Conducting Educational Design Research. London: Routledge. ISBN 978-0-415-61803-8.
- McKenney, Susan; Reeves, Thomas C. (2019). Conducting Educational Design Research (2nd ed.). London: Routledge. doi:10.4324/9781315105642. ISBN 978-1-138-09556-4.

=== Selected publications ===
- Reeves, Thomas C.; Oh, Eunjung Grace (2017). "The goals and methods of educational technology research over a quarter century (1989–2014)". Educational Technology Research and Development. 65 (2): 325–339. doi:10.1007/s11423-016-9474-1.
- Reeves, Thomas C.; McKenney, Susan; Herrington, Jan (2011). "Publishing and perishing: The critical importance of educational design research". Australasian Journal of Educational Technology. 27 (1). doi:10.14742/ajet.982.
- Reeves, Thomas C.; Herrington, Jan; Oliver, Ron (2005). "Design research: A socially responsible approach to instructional technology research in higher education". Journal of Computing in Higher Education. 16 (2): 96–115. doi:10.1007/BF02961476.
- Herrington, Jan; Oliver, Ron; Reeves, Thomas C. (2003). "Patterns of engagement in authentic online learning environments". Australasian Journal of Educational Technology. 19 (1). doi:10.14742/ajet.1701.

=== Book chapters ===
- McKenney, Susan; Reeves, Thomas C. (2014). "Educational Design Research". In Spector, J. Michael; Merrill, M. David; Elen, Jan; Bishop, M. J. (eds.). Handbook of Research on Educational Communications and Technology (4th ed.). New York: Springer. pp. 131–140. doi:10.1007/978-1-4614-3185-5_11. ISBN 978-1-4614-3184-8.
- Herrington, Jan; Reeves, Thomas C.; Oliver, Ron (2014). "Authentic Learning Environments". In Spector, J. Michael; Merrill, M. David; Elen, Jan; Bishop, M. J. (eds.). Handbook of Research on Educational Communications and Technology (4th ed.). New York: Springer. pp. 401–412. doi:10.1007/978-1-4614-3185-5_32. ISBN 978-1-4614-3184-8.
- Reeves, Thomas C. (2006). "Design research from a technology perspective". In van den Akker, Jan; Gravemeijer, Koeno; McKenney, Susan; Nieveen, Nienke (eds.). Educational Design Research. London: Routledge. ISBN 0-415-39635-2.

== Awards and recognition ==
In 1995, Multimedia Producer magazine selected Reeves as one of the 100 leading figures in multimedia. He was made a Fellow of the Association for the Advancement of Computing in Education (AACE) in 2003. A Guide to Authentic e-Learning received AECT's 2010 Design and Development Outstanding Book Award, and in 2013 the association's Research and Theory Division gave Conducting Educational Design Research its Outstanding Book Award. Also in 2013, AECT presented him with the David H. Jonassen Excellence in Research Award in recognition of research on instructional design and technology spanning his career, and in 2025 it named him an AECT Fellow.

The Australasian Society for Computers in Learning in Tertiary Education (ascilite) named Reeves a Fellow in 2010, and he was the first American to receive the fellowship.
