= Battle of Inkerman =

1854 battle of the Crimean War

Battle of Inkermann
- Part of the Crimean War
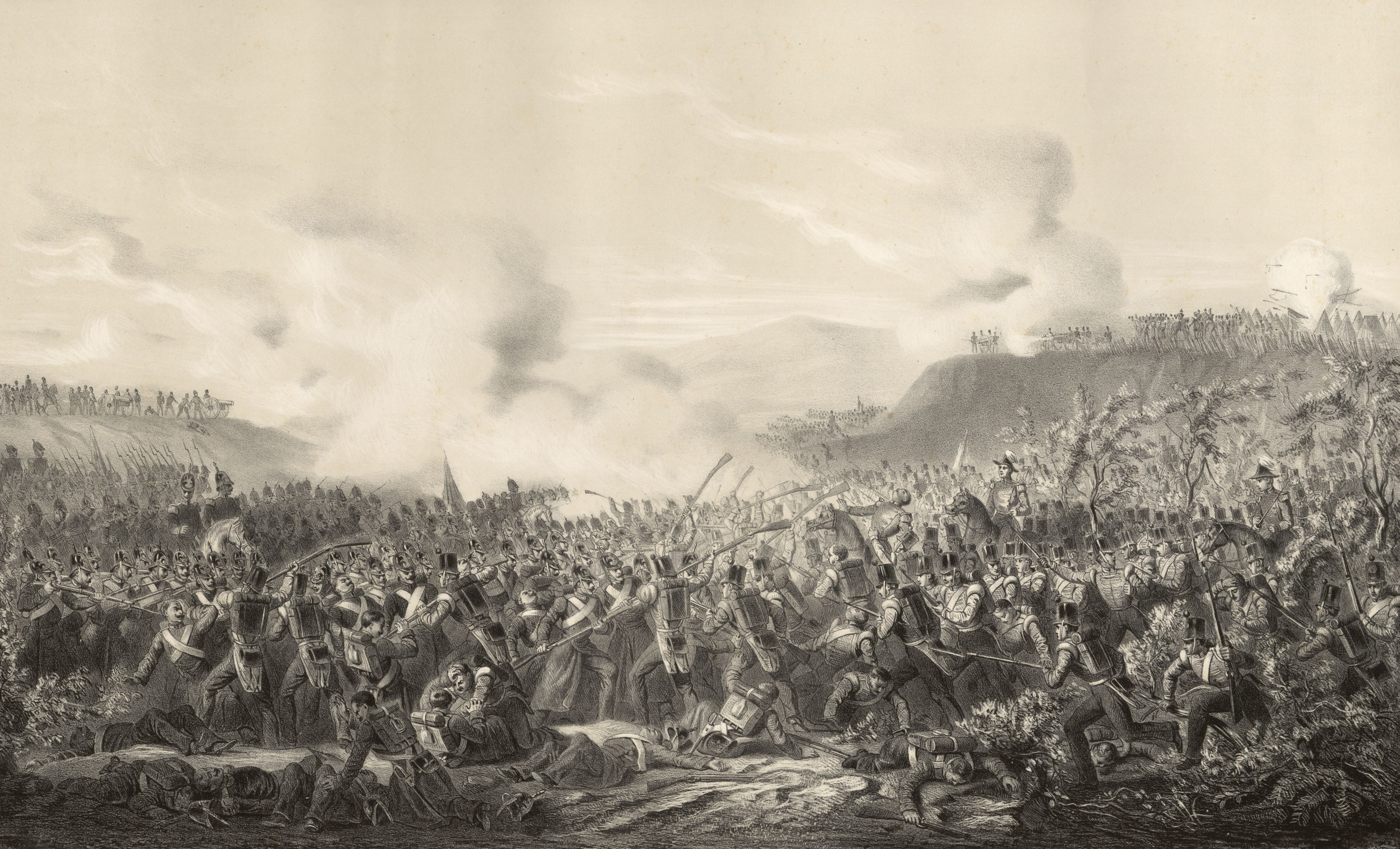
- The British 26th Foot charging Russian troops with bayonets during the battle
Date	5 November 1854
Location	Inkerman, Taurida Governorate, Russia 44°35′06″N 33°35′31″E
Result	Anglo-French victory

Belligerents
United Kingdom; France	Russia

Commanders and leaders
(United Kingdom) FitzRoy Somerset (France) François Canrobert (France) Pierre Bosquet	(Russia) Alexander Menshikov

Strength
16,000 (Note: British: 8,500 men; French: 7,500 men)	35,000 to 40,500

Casualties and losses
4,373 killed & wounded	11,959 killed & wounded

The Battle of Inkerman was fought during the Crimean War on 5 November 1854 by the allied armies of the United Kingdom and France against the Imperial Russian Army. The battle broke the will of the Russian Army to defeat the allies in the field, and was followed by the siege of Sevastopol. The role of troops fighting mostly on their own initiative due to the foggy conditions during the battle has earned the engagement the name "The Soldier's Battle."

The Russian advance force attacked a fortified British hilltop and captured it, but could not hold it and was forced to fall back in turn. The arrival of Russian reinforcements put the heavily outnumbered British in a critical situation, but French troops soon reached the field to turn the tide of the battle, resulting in a Russian retreat.

== Background ==
The allied armies of Britain, France and the Ottoman Empire had landed on the west coast of Crimea on 14 September 1854, intending to capture the Russian naval base at Sevastopol. The allied armies fought off and defeated the Russian Army at the Battle of Alma, forcing them to retreat in some confusion toward the River Kacha. While the allies could have taken this opportunity to attack Sevastopol before Sevastopol could be put into a proper state of defence, the allied commanders, British general FitzRoy Somerset, 1st Baron Raglan and the French commander François Certain Canrobert could not agree on a plan of attack.

Instead, they resolved to march around the city, and put Sevastopol under siege. Toward this end the allies marched to the southern coast of the Crimean peninsula and established a supply port at the city of Balaclava. However, before the siege of Sevastopol began, the Russian commander Prince Menshikov evacuated Sevastopol with the major portion of his field army, leaving only a garrison to defend the city. On 25 October 1854, a superior Russian force attacked the British base at Balaclava, and although the Russian attack was foiled before it could reach the base, the Russians were left holding a strong position north of the British line. Balaclava revealed the allied weakness; their siege lines were so long they did not have sufficient troops to man them. Realising this, Menshikov launched an attack across the Tchernaya River on 4 November 1854.

== Battle ==
=== Assault ===
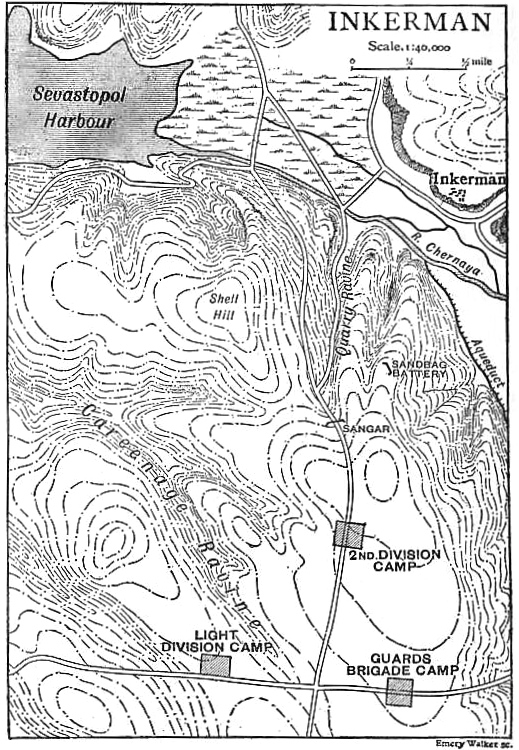

On 5 November 1854, the Russian 10th Division, under Lt. General F. I. Soymonov, launched a heavy attack on the allied right flank atop Home Hill east from the Russian position on Shell Hill. The assault was made by two columns of 35,000 men and 134 field artillery guns of the Russian 10th Division. When combined with other Russian forces in the area, the Russian attacking force would form a formidable army of some 42,000 men. The initial Russian assault was to be received by the British Second Division dug in on Home Hill with only 2,700 men and 12 guns. Both Russian columns moved in a flanking fashion east towards the British. They hoped to overwhelm this portion of the Allied army before reinforcements could arrive. The fog of the early morning hours aided the Russians by hiding their approach. Not all the Russian troops could fit on the narrow 300-metre-wide heights of Shell Hill. Accordingly, General Soymonov had followed Prince Alexander Menshikov's directive and deployed some of his force around the Careenage Ravine. Furthermore, on the night before the attack, Soymonov was ordered by General Peter A. Dannenberg to send part of his force north and east to the Inkerman Bridge to cover the crossing of Russian troop reinforcements under Lt. General P. Ya. Pavlov. Thus, Soymonov could not effectively employ all of his troops in the attack.

When dawn broke, Soymonov attacked the British positions on Home Hill with 6,300 men from the Kolyvansky, Ekaterinburg and Tomsky regiments. Soymonov also had a further 9,000 in reserve. The British had strong pickets and had ample warning of the Russian attack despite the early morning fog. The pickets, some of them at company strength, engaged the Russians as they moved to attack. The firing in the valley also gave warning to the rest of the Second Division, who rushed to their defensive positions. De Lacy Evans, commander of the British Second Division, had been injured in a fall from his horse so command of the Second Division was taken up by Major-General John Pennefather, a highly aggressive officer. Pennefather did not know that he was facing a superior Russian force. Thus he abandoned Evans' plan of falling back to draw the Russians within range of the British field artillery which was hidden behind Home Hill. Instead, Pennefather ordered his 2,700 strong division to attack. When they did so, the Second Division faced some 15,300 Russian soldiers. Russian guns bombarded Home Hill, but there were no troops on the crest at this point.

=== The Second Division in action; the Russians in the valley ===
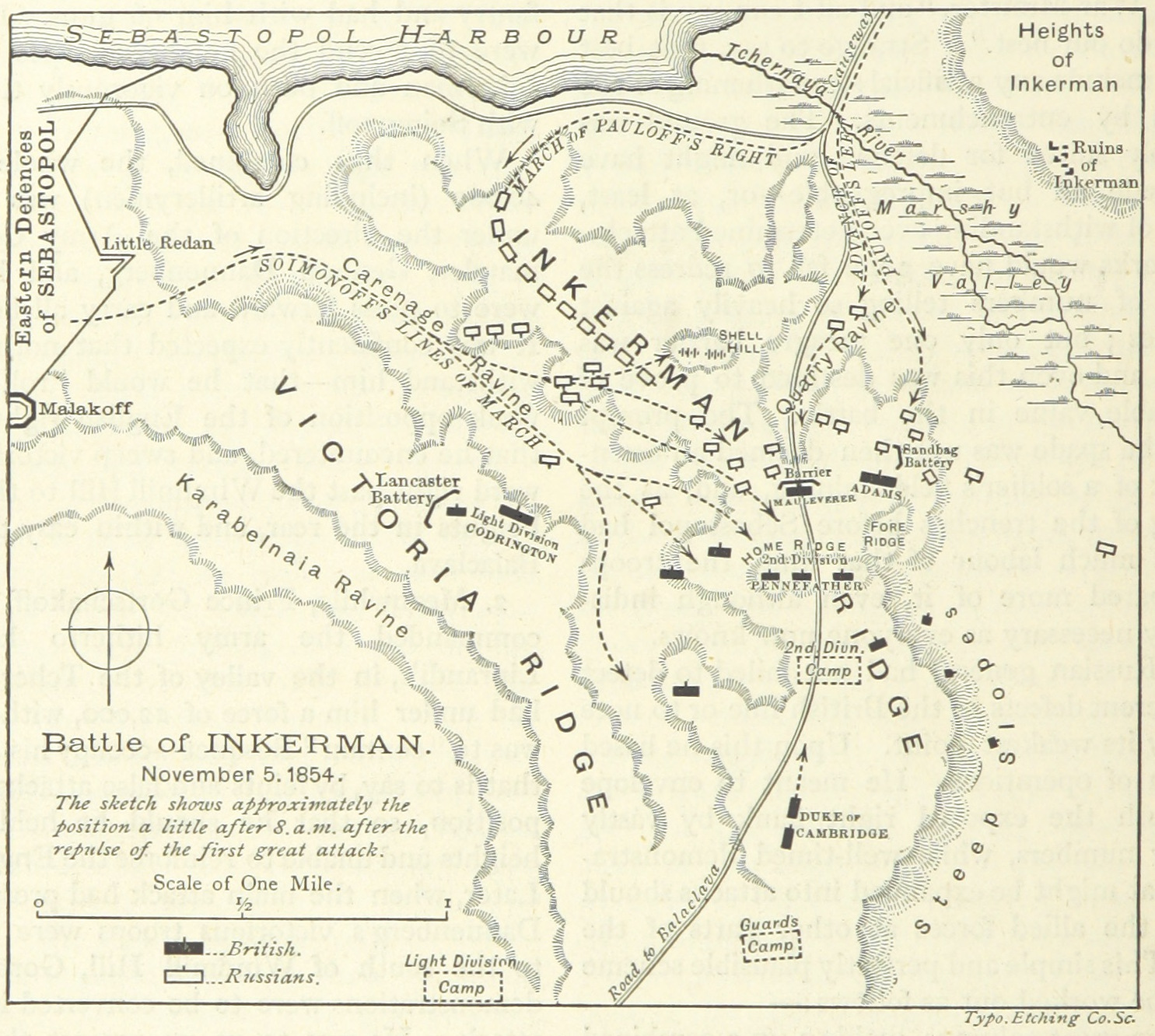
A British map of the positions of the forces after the initial assault

The Russian infantry, advancing through the fog, were met by the advancing Second Division, who opened fire with their Pattern 1851 Enfield rifles, whereas the Russians were still armed with smoothbore muskets. The Russians were forced into a bottleneck owing to the shape of the valley, and came out on the Second Division's left flank. The Minié balls of the British rifles proved deadly accurate against the Russian attack. Those Russian troops that survived were pushed back at bayonet point. Eventually, the Russian infantry were pushed all the way back to their own artillery positions. The Russians launched a second attack, also on the Second Division's left flank, but this time in much larger numbers and led by Soymonov himself. Captain Hugh Rowlands, in charge of the British pickets, reported that the Russians charged "with the most fiendish yells you can imagine." At this point, after the second attack, the British position was incredibly weak. If Soymonov had known the condition of the British, he would have ordered a third attack before the British reinforcements arrived. Such a third attack might well have succeeded, but Soymonov could not see in the fog and thus did not know of the desperate situation of the British. Instead, he awaited the arrival of his own reinforcements—General Pavlov's men who were making their way toward the Inkerman battlefield in four different prong attacks from the north. (Note: See the map on page XXX of Orlando Figes, The Crimean War.) However, the British reinforcements arrived in the form of the Light Division which came up and immediately launched a counterattack along the left flank of the Russian front, forcing the Russians back. During this fighting Soymonov was killed by a British rifleman. Russian command was immediately taken up by Colonel Pristovoitov, who was himself shot a few minutes later. Colonel Uvazhnov-Aleksandrov assumed command of the Russian forces but was also killed in the withering British fire. At this point, no officer seemed keen to take up command and Captain Andrianov was sent on horseback to consult with various generals about the problem.

At seven o'clock, Pavlov's Okhotsky, Yakutsky and Selenginsky regiments crossed the Chernaia, joining Soimonov's men. Pavlov's Tarutinsky's regiments engaged Adams' 700 men at the Sandbag Battery, forcing them retreat to Home Ridge.

=== Home Ridge ===
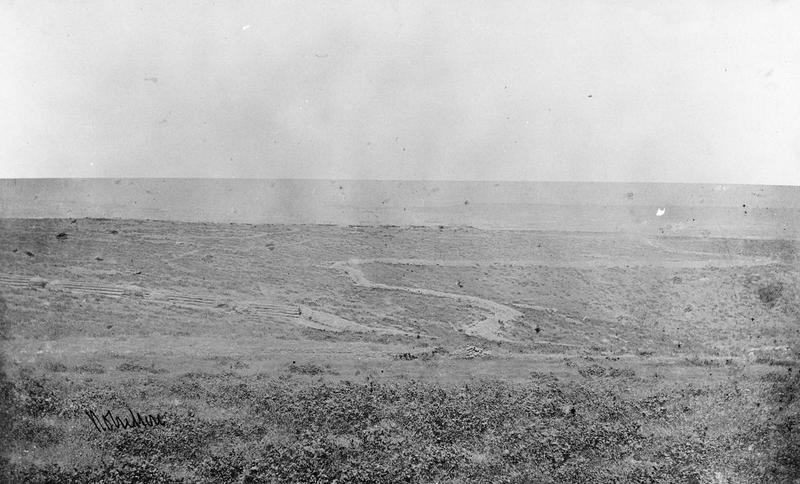
The Field of Inkermann, with the trenches

The Grenadiers under the command of the Duke of Cambridge arrived and initiated a new assault on Sandbag Battery. In the words of Figes, "The fighting became increasingly frenzied and chaotic, as one side charged the other down the hill, only to be counter-attacked by another group of men from further up the hill." Pierre Bosquet's Zouaves, called upon by Raglan earlier, then overwhelmed the Russians, driving the Tarutinsky Regiment from Sandbag Battery and onward to St. Clement's Ravine, before the Zouaves joined the British on Home Ridge. Dannenberg, leading Pavlov's Okhotsky, Yakutsky and Selenginsky regiments, with the remnants of Soimonov's, then attacked the Sandbag Battery, while George Cathcart's 4th Division six companies attacked the ridge by Sandbag Battery. Stunned by the French arrival, the Russians retreated to Shell Hill, where they came under fire from the British two 18-pounders. Dannenberg then ordered a retreat, and the Russians fled in panic.

=== Fourth Division in action ===
When the British Fourth Division arrived under General George Cathcart, they were finally able to go on the offensive, but confusion reigned. The Duke requested him to fill the 'gap' on the left of the Guards, to prevent them from being isolated; when Cathcart asked Pennefather where to help, Pennefather replied "Everywhere.", so Cathcart dispersed his men in different directions, until about 400 men were left. Quartermaster general Lord Airey told Cathcart to "Support the Brigade of Guards. Do not descend or leave the plateau... Those are Lord Raglan's orders." Cathcart moved his men to the right. The courage of Cathcart and his men had the unexpected effect of encouraging other British units to charge the Russians. However, the flanking troops were caught in the rear by an unexpected Russian counter-attack, during which Cathcart, believing that the Guards had mistaken them for Russians, ordered his men to remove their greatcoats, but the firing intensified, and Cathcart was shot from his horse and killed as he led 50 men of the 20th Regiment of Foot up a hill (Cathcart's Hill), leaving his troops disorganized and the attack was broken up. This gave the Russian army an opportunity to gain a crest on the ridge. However, as the Russian troops were coming up, they were attacked and driven off by newly arrived soldiers from the French camps. The French, with marvelous rapidity, brought up a division from five miles (8.0 km) away and poured reinforcements into the entire line, reducing the Russians' advantage in numbers.

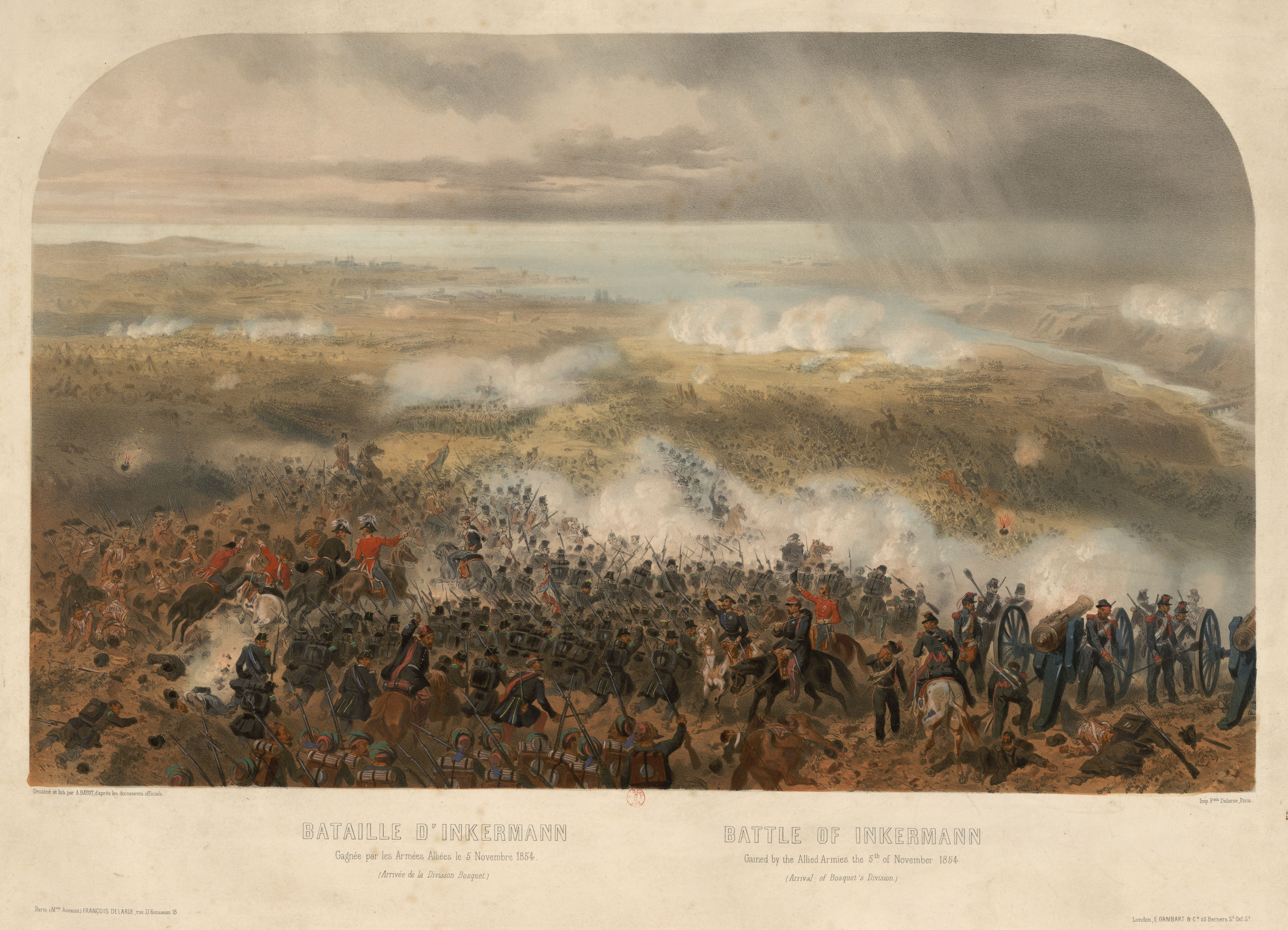
Arrival of Bosquet's division

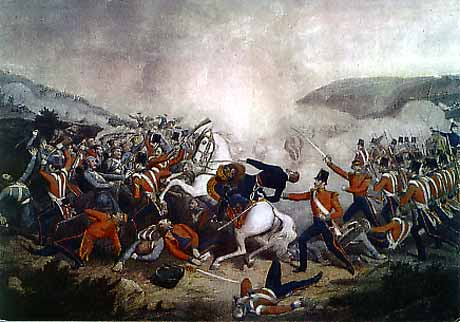
Death of general Cathcart

== Aftermath ==
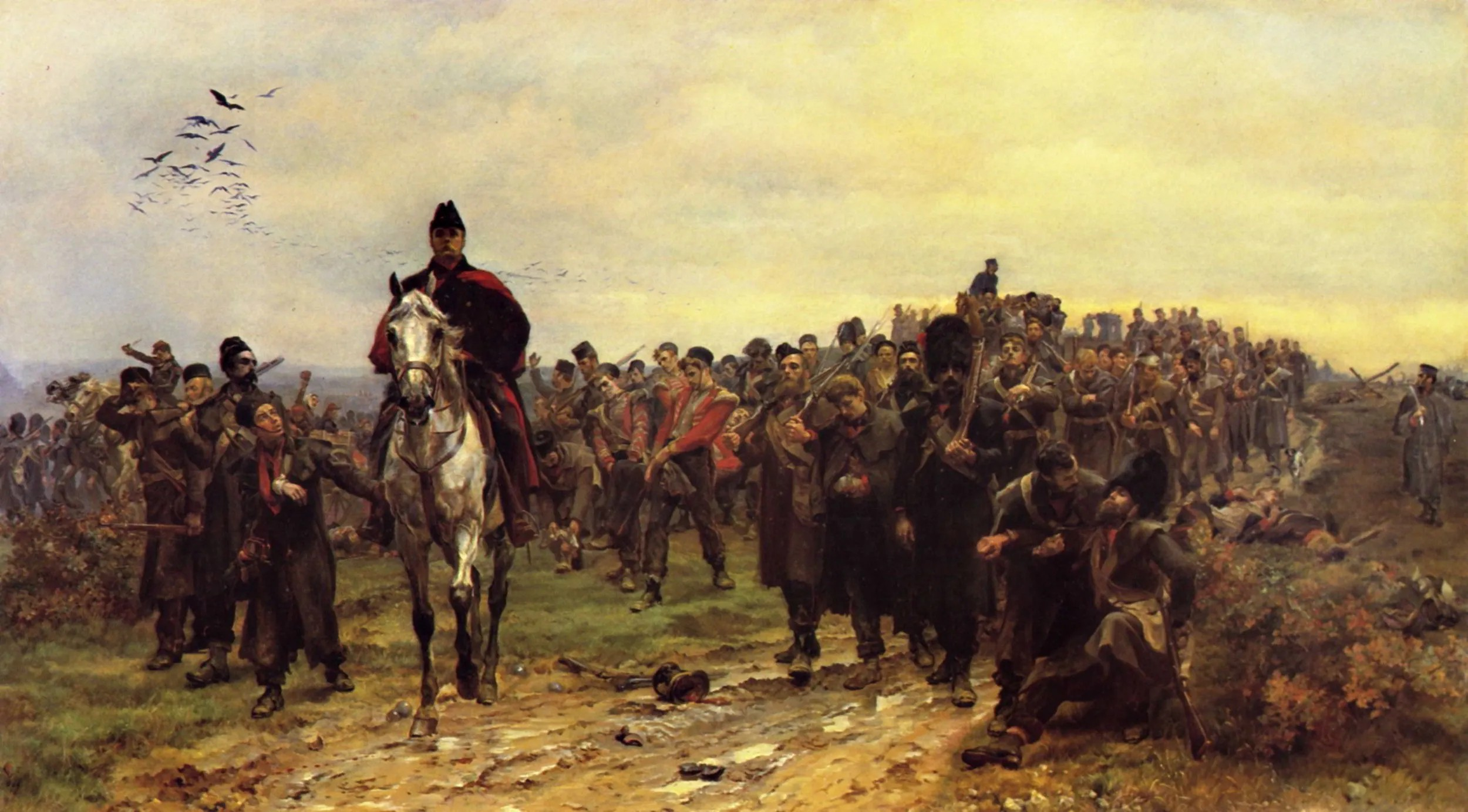
The Return from Inkerman by Elizabeth Thompson, 1877

The dense fog precluded effective control by senior commanders, leading to fighting amongst units smaller than a company in size. Figes called it a "soldier's battle". Though still in control of the heights around Sevastopol, the British and French casualties were such that any further attack on Sevastopol would require reinforcements.

Alexander Kinglake obtained the official casualty returns for the battle. By his account allied casualties were: 2,573 British, of whom 635 were killed, and 1,800 French, of whom 175 were killed. Russia lost 3,286 killed within a total (including men taken prisoner) of 11,959 casualties. (Note: From the general engagement of 5 November, including the fight on Mount Inkerman, there resulted, it seems, to the Russians a loss of 9,845 in killed, wounded, and prisoners [of which 3,286 killed]; to the English a loss of 2,573, of whom 635 were killed...Official return[s].)

== Legacy ==
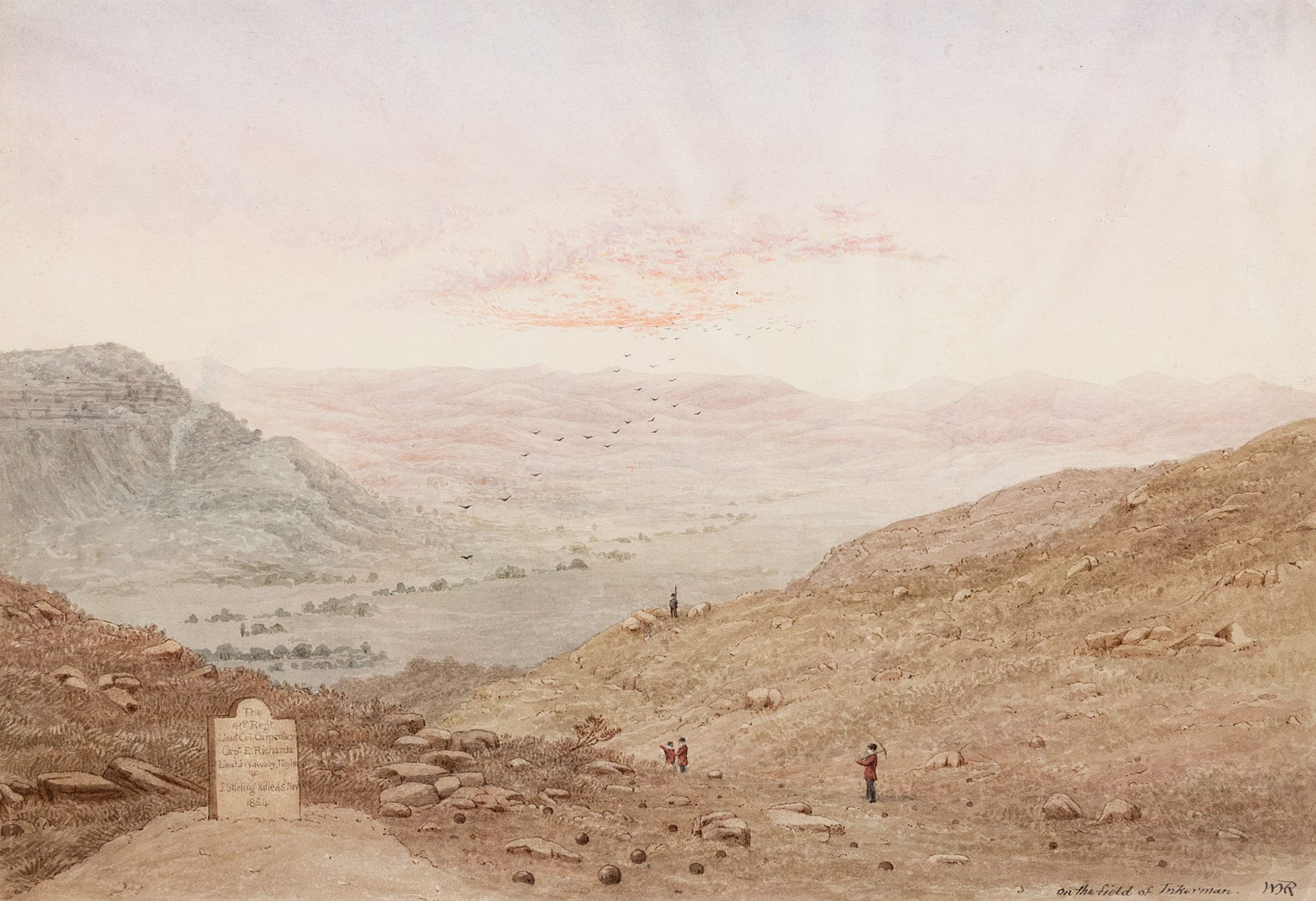
On the field of Inkerman, attributed to William Howard Russell. The stone commemorates four officers of the 41st; Captain Richards and Lieutenants Swab(e)y, Taylor and Stirling, killed on 5 November.

The battle popularised the use of the name Inkerman in placenames in Victorian England, including Inkerman Road in Kentish Town, London, Inkerman Road, St Albans, Inkerman Street in Preston and Luton, Inkerman Way in Knaphill, and Inkerman Court, House and Way in Denby Dale. There is an Inkerman Street in Mosman, New South Wales, Australia, at the end of Countess Street. There is also an Inkerman Street in St Kilda, Victoria, Australia, in between Balaclava Road and Alma Road. Inkerman, a locality in South Australia, was named in 1856. There is also an Inkerman, New Brunswick, and an Inkerman, Ontario, named after the battle.

In 1918, a French minesweeper named Inkerman was constructed in Ontario—it was lost on its maiden voyage.

On the popular and long running Granada Television soap opera Coronation Street, a nearby Inkerman Street has been mentioned on occasion.

In Whatever Happened to the Likely Lads? Terry Collier’s address is given in dialogue as 127 Inkerman Terrace (Series 1 Episode 7, "No Hiding Place").

During Operation Herrick in Afghanistan, there was a forward operating base named FOB Inkerman.

The third company of the Grenadier Guards is known colloquially as the "Inkerman Company" for their part in the battle.

== See also ==
Soldiers awarded the Victoria Cross at the battle include:

- Thomas Beach
- John Byrne
- Henry Hugh Clifford
- Gerald Goodlake
- James Gorman
- Andrew Henry
- Robert Loyd-Lindsay, 1st Baron Wantage‡
- Ambrose Madden
- John McDermond
- Frederick Miller
- Anthony Palmer
- John Park‡
- Lord Henry Percy
- John Prettyjohns
- Thomas Reeves
- Hugh Rowlands
- Sir Charles Russell, 3rd Baronet
- Mark Scholefield
- William Stanlake
- George Symons
- Mark Walker
- George Walters

‡ Awarded for actions at Inkerman and at the Battle of the Alma
