= Latas (Aragonese dynasty) =

Aragonese noble family

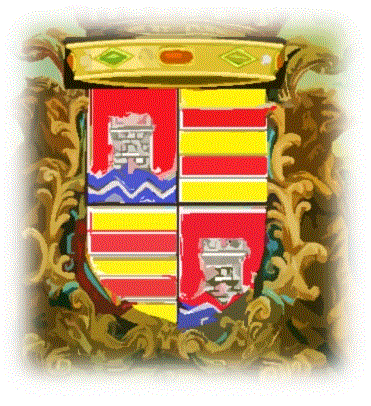
Coat of arms of the Latas family

The Latas family [pronunciation: 'la tas' ] is a noble historic family infanzona Aragonese that was first documented as Latas or Lata in 1055 a.C. The family comes from the mountains of the primitive Kingdom of Aragon, in the northern half of the current Spanish province of Huesca.

== History ==
Place of Latas, northern Huesca

Lineage's geographical origin lies in the place of Latas, where the name was taken, in the municipality of Sardas, in Jaca's judicial district. The Great Aragonese Encyclopedia (Gran Enciclopedia Aragonesa) states that Latas lineage is of Aragonese noblemen and details the progressive expansion of Latas in the town of Villamayor since 1655, in the city of Zaragoza since 1681, in Tauste since 1731, in Almudévar since 1731 and at least, in Sobradiel since 1775 (all according to the Royal Court of Aragon). Antonio de Latas, Martín de Latas or Miguel de Latas are representatives of the noble condition of the Lineage as documents of the 16th century show.

== Heraldry ==
Infanzón crown

The book "Repertorio de Blasones de la Comunidad Hispánica" give us the description of historical Coat of Arms of Latas Lineage. Quartered shield: 1 and 4 : gules, a tower of silver, waves on water of azure and silver, and 2nd and 3rd : gold, two bands of azure . The Coat of Arms is presided by the lofty status that grants the infanzonía, symbolized as a crown.
