= Latha =

Latha may refer to:

== People ==
=== First name ===
- Latha Mangipudi, American politician
- Latha Kurien Rajeev (born 1965), Indian film producer
- Latha Hamsalekha (born 1957), Indian singer
- Latha Rajinikanth (born 1958), Indian film producer
- Latha Raju (born 1953), Indian actress and singer
- Latha Sethupathi (born 1953), Indian actress, known mononymously as Latha
- Latha Walpola (born 1934), Sri Lankan musician

=== Surname ===
- Maadhavi Latha (born 1988), Indian actress
- Paul Boundoukou-Latha (born 1952), Gabonese politician and diplomat

== Other uses ==
- Latha Township, Myanmar

== See also ==
- Lata (disambiguation)
