= Convention of Scutari =

1862 treaty between Montenegro and the Ottomans

The Convention of Scutari (Modern Turkish: İşkodra Barışı) was a treaty signed between the Ottoman Empire and the Principality of Montenegro on 31 August 1862.

== Background ==
The Principality of Montenegro was not recognized state by the Ottoman Empire. During the first half of the 19th century the Ottoman dominance was weakened and Nikola I, the prince of Montenegro, felt free to support a rebellion in the neighbouring Ottoman province of Herzegovina. Ottoman general Ömer Pasha, who was in charge of suppressing the rebellion, defeated the rebels and marched towards Cetinje (then the capital of Montenegro) .

== The treaty ==
The treaty was signed in Scutari in Ottoman Empire (present-day Shkodër, Albania) after Montenegro sued for peace. The terms were:

1. Vassal status of Montenegro (as well as province borderline) was ratified
2. Mirko Petrović-Njegoš, Nikola's father who had fought against Ottomans was deported
3. Weapon import to Montenegro was banned
4. The provincial borderline between Montenegro and Herzegovina was put under Ottoman military control

== Aftermath ==
Montenegro became independent by the Treaty of Berlin signed after the Russo-Turkish War of 1877–1878.
