= Grigore Sturdza =

Moldavian/Romanian soldier and politician (1821–1901)

Grigore Mihail Sturdza
- Beizadea
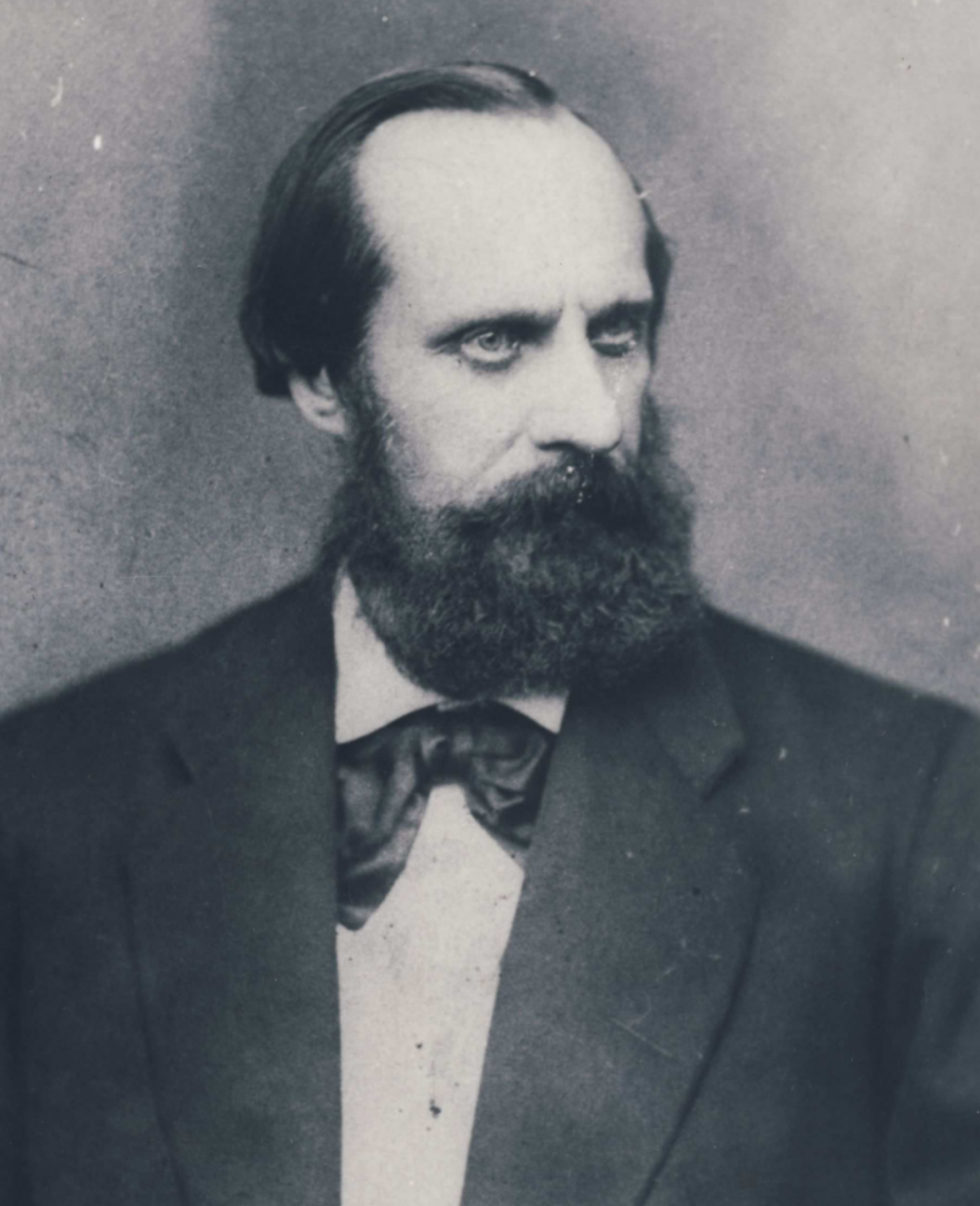
- Photograph of Sturdza, dated ca. 1875

Heir-apparent of Moldavia
- Period: c. 1840 – 1849
- Predecessor: Dimitrie Mihail Sturdza
- Successor: Grigore Alexandru Ghica (as Prince)

Pretender to the Moldavian throne
- Period: 1849 – ?
- Predecessor: Mihail Sturdza
- Successor: none (claim renounced)
- Born: 11 May 1821; Sculeni, Bessarabia Governorate, Russian Empire
- Died: 26 January 1901 (aged 79); Bucharest, Kingdom of Romania
- Burial: Bellu Cemetery, Bucharest; Agapia Monastery (reburial)
- Spouse: Countess Dash (disputed); Olga Ghica; Ralu Turculeț
- Issue: ~9 legitimate; various illegitimate children
- House: Sturdza
- Father: Mihail Sturdza
- Mother: Elisabeta "Săftica" Rosetti-Paladi
- Religion: Romanian Orthodox
- Occupation: Soldier, merchant, agriculturalist, politician, jurist, philosopher, physicist, inventor, composer
- Military career
- Allegiance: Moldavia; Ottoman Empire (Romania) United Principalities
- Service: Moldavian princely militia Ottoman cavalry Romanian Land Forces
- Service years: 1834–1849, 1852–1858, 1860s
- Rank: Brigadier General; Pasha
- Nicknames: Muklis; Beizadea Vițel; Pașoalca
- Conflicts: Moldavian Revolution of 1848; Crimean War: Battle of Oltenița; Battle of Cetate; Battle of Eupatoria; Siege of Sevastopol

Grigore Mihail Sturdza, first name also Grigorie or Grigori, last name also Sturza, Stourdza, Sturd̦a, and Stourza (also known as Muklis Pasha, George Mukhlis, and Beizadea Vițel; 23 May [O.S. 11 May] 1821– 8 February [O.S. 26 January] 1901), was a Moldavian, later Romanian, soldier, politician, and adventurer. He was the son of Prince Mihail Sturdza, a scion of the ancient boyardom, and, during the 1840s, an heir apparent to the Moldavian throne, for which he was known throughout his later life as Moldavia's Beizadea (junior prince). A rebellious youth famous for his feats of strength, he set up his own private militia which he used to corner the Moldavian grain trade, and entered a legal battle with Sardinian retailers. In 1845, he defied his father and French law by seeking to marry the much older, already married Countess Dash, and barricaded himself with her at Perieni. By 1847, Grigore had been reintegrated into the Moldavian establishment and, as a general in the Moldavian princely militia, personally handled repression during the attempted revolution of April 1848. During these events, the Beizadea became the personal enemy of three future statesmen—Alexandru Ioan Cuza, Mihail Kogălniceanu, and Manolache Costache Epureanu.

Following Mihail Sturdza's ouster in 1849, Grigore joined the Ottoman army as a colonel and took part in the Crimean War, serving under Michał Czajkowski and Omar Pasha. A mounted sniper noted for his feats of extreme courage, he was advanced to Brigadier General. A plan, discussed by Czajkowski, had Sturdza placed in a command position for an offensive into Southern Bessarabia; this never materialized, though Sturdza served on the commission which awarded that region back to Moldavia upon the end of the war. Grigore and Mihail Sturdza competed with each other for the princely election of 1858, with their rivalry playing a major part in the victory of a third candidate, Cuza. During the formation of the United Principalities in 1859–1864, Sturdza maintained conservative principles as a member of the Central Commission, thereafter alternating between loyal opposition in the Romanian Assembly of Deputies and anti-Cuza conspiracy, while being particularly adverse to Cuza's projected land reform. Himself a claimant to either the throne of a secessionist Moldavia or that of Romanian Domnitor, he participated in the "monstrous coalition" which managed to depose Cuza in early 1866.

With the arrival of Carol I as Domnitor, Sturdza became leader of the "White" conservatives in Iași, also taking up the cause of regionalism; he stirred national controversy by circulating an extreme conservative manifesto known as the "Petition of Iași". His views on international politics eventually brought him into a dispute with the moderate conservatives at Junimea. Shunning Junimist Germanophilia, Sturdza became a committed Russophile during the Romanian War of Independence, forming his own group, the National-Democratic Party. This faction broke apart after its members were questioned regarding an assassination attempt on Prime Minister Ion Brătianu; eventually, Sturdza himself was recruited by Brătianu's National Liberal Party in the 1890s. By then, the Beizadea was dedicated mostly to his non-political work, including attempts to establish his profile as a composer, philosopher, inventor, and art sponsor; his last activities included raising a Sturdza Palace in Bucharest. He was also absorbed and financially exhausted by a long trial involving his family inheritance. Known for his sexual promiscuity and fathering of illegitimate children, he left a diminished estate that was itself disputed among his progeny.

== Biography ==
=== Origins and childhood ===
As reported by scholar Moses Gaster, Grigore's family, the Sturdzas, were "long and intimately associated with the government first of Moldavia and afterwards of Rumania." Their origin, Gaster speculates, was in the Empire of Trebizond, whence they settled Moldavia and Wallachia during the 17th century. Other sources indicate that the first known Sturdza actually lived in Moldavia during the mid-16th-century reigns of Alexandru Lăpușneanu; he was of plausible, but unconfirmed, Aromanian origin. The Beizadea's grandfather, Logothete Grigorașcu Sturdza, enshrined a legend according to which the family was a branch of the Hungarian Thurzós, and that it ultimately had Dalmatian origins. Reportedly, Grigore did not favor this claim, but instead regarded himself as a descendant of Vlad the Impaler. His contemporary, the genealogist and polemicist Constantin Sion, lists the Sturdzas as native Moldavians from Putna County.

In her 1901 obituary for the Société astronomique de France, Dorothea Klumpke noted that the Beizadea was a native of "Scutarie" village in Russia's Bessarabia Governorate (formerly a part of Moldavia), and gives his birth date as May 11, 1821. An 1849 letter sent by Sturdza clarifies the date as Julian, which remained in use in Moldavia and Romania throughout his life, and which corresponds to May 23. It also explains that the Bessarabian locality was in fact Sculeni, his family having fled there from the ravages of the Greek Revolution in Moldavia; as a baby, he lived in Bessarabia, then in Bukovina, Austrian Empire. Other obituaries and biographies suggest that Sturdza was born at Iași, the Moldavian capital city. Grigore's parents were Mihail and his first wife, Elisabeta "Săftica" Paladi, who descended from the Rosetti family. Her relative, the politician-historian Radu Rosetti, claims that the marriage was forced, noting that Mihail was "ugly-faced, ruddy-haired, short in stature, bowlegged [and] surly". Through Săftica and through his paternal grandmother Maria (a Callimachi), Grigore was partly Greek; his great-grandfather was a Phanariote, Gregory Callimachi, who served as Moldavian Prince in the 1760s.

By 1820, both countries were beginning their emancipation from Ottoman vassalage. A relative, Ioan "Ioniță" Sturdza, was being recognized by the Sublime Porte as the reigning Prince of Moldavia, putting an end to a century of Phanariote reigns. Unusually, he met most opposition from the "seven pillars of Moldavia, all of them great boyars"—a group which included Grigorașcu Sturdza. In February 1823, Grigorașcu and Maria's son Mihail was the first Moldavian to call himself a man of "conservative principles". The Sturdza ascendancy was interrupted by the Russo-Turkish War of 1828, during which Prince Ioan was captured by the Imperial Russian Army. The war ended with an increase of Russian influence over Wallachia and Moldavia, codified into the constitutional act, Regulamentul Organic. In April 1834, Mihail was selected for the Moldavian throne, beginning a reign which lasted to June 1849; during that interval, Grigore was to be referred to as Beizadea—an informal title bestowed upon sons of the Hospodar. However, his mother was no longer included in the princely family: in order to gain the trust of Ottoman Foreign Minister Mustafa Reşid Pasha, Mihail divorced Săftica and married Stefan Bogoridi's daughter, Smaranda. From this marriage, Grigore had two stepbrothers, both named Mihail—the first one died in 1846, the second one, born in 1848, only survived to 1863; a stepsister, Maria (1848–1905), went on to marry Konstantin Aleksandrovich, son of the Russian statesman Alexander Gorchakov.

=== Training ===
Grigore began service in the Moldavian princely militia in August 1834, when he became a cavalry cadet. He was much impressed by the experience, which shaped his lifelong belief in militarism. Around coronation time, he and his elder brother Dimitrie were being tutored at Miroslava school by a Professor Victor de Lincourt. In September 1834, their father sent them to study in the Kingdom of France—alongside Mihail Kogălniceanu and other young boyars, and with Lincourt as a chaperon, they were assigned to a school in Lunéville. This path mirrored Mihail's own schooling and, in addition, was selected in order to prevent Grigore and Dimitrie from being educated in Russia. It was also designed to avoid Paris, which was the center of radical politics ever since the July Revolution: "youth from good families [had] to learn French, the language of diplomacy, and receive a good instruction, were carefully kept out of any contact with the liberal or revolutionary spirit." The news was finally communicated to the Russian Emperor, Nicholas I, who was indignant that his subordinate's sons were being educated in liberal France, and pondered having Sturdza dethroned. Another factor which made stay in France unlikely was an illegal duel, in which Grigore wounded his colleague Lippmann.

In August 1835 the two boys were relocated to the French Gymnasium in the Prussian capital, Berlin. In addition to the regular schedule, they were given lessons in legal history, and applied their new-found knowledge to the study of Moldavian law. Grigore earned top marks for his academic interests, but also for his courageous and passionate character; he and Dimitrie graduated together, enlisting at Berlin University in October 1837. Grigore was supposed to take lectures in natural law from Eduard Gans, but the latter died before he could enlist. He eventually studied political economy under Adolph Riedel, and technology with Heinrich Gustav Magnus, renouncing all legal study in April 1840; according to various records, he took history with Leopold von Ranke and was introduced to natural sciences by Alexander von Humboldt and Heinrich Wilhelm Dove. In a sarcastic note, Gérard de Nerval referred to Sturdza as having "more studied than understood Hegel's philosophy".

The Beizadea spent three more years in Berlin. Biographers speculate that he probably attended a Prussian military school, though it remains more clearly attested that Grigore was being privately tutored by an artillery officer of the Gardekorps. Both brothers took legal courses at home, focusing especially on Byzantine law. This was meant to serve them in their mission of modernizing Moldavia's courts. In 1838, they had been advanced to Lieutenants in the militia and had acquired junior position on Mihail's privy council; at some point before 1848, "without ever having served in the Russian army, [they] received from Emperor Nicholas the rank of Polkovnik (Colonel)." This was possibly an honor requested by their father.

Grigore was already unusually tall, a trait that he inherited from his Rosetti mother, and had been born with "outstanding muscular strength". An 1838 letter by Prince Sturdza's secretary, Charles Tissot, notes that Grigore was becoming a bodybuilder: "He excels in all manner of exercises and displays outstanding physical force. This strength shows up in everything he undertakes." Various accounts make note of his unusual exercise routine, which included transporting a calf on his shoulders—which gave rise to his affectionate or derisive moniker, Beizadea Vițel ("Beizadea [of the] Calf"). Rumors rendered by Nerval suggest that by 1844 he could also lift a grown man on just one arm, as well as, on both arms, a barbell weighing some 1,100 metric pounds (550 kilograms). Radu Rosetti, who befriended the Beizadea when the latter was aged over fifty, recalls that he still pursued his physical routine, which now included grip strength exercises, and that he would often perform them in the semi-nude. Writer George Costescu similarly notes that, in maturity, Grigore Sturdza was an avid and tireless swimmer, especially fond of the waters outside Agigea; in winter, he enjoyed wrestling matches with a good friend, George San-Marin.

=== Countess Dash affair ===
Nikolay Girs, who served in 1841 as Dragoman for the Russian Consulate in Iași, describes Dimitrie as a "gentle and harmless young fella" who dedicated himself to training horses. By contrast, Grigore was a man of "boundless pride", who "inspired fear on all people, including to his authoritarian father". This judgement was partly replicated by the Austrian agent Stokera, who found the elder Sturdza sibling to be "rather poor with the spirit", also arguing that, at this stage, Grigore was committed to Moldavia's "Russian party". Despite his lack of seniority, Grigore was being groomed to succeed Mihail on the princely throne. Reportedly, he asked his father to allow him a relocation to Paris, which he found to be warmer and more intellectually prestigious, as well as more sexually liberated, than Berlin. Reportedly, in 1839 the future "Muklis" had also joined the Turkish Freemasonry, and, with his personal example, helped spark recruitment into the less developed Moldavian Freemasonry; according to literary historian Radu Cernătescu, this activity was satirized by Vasile Alecsandri in his 1840 play, Farmazonul din Hârlău ("The Freemason of Hârlău"), with Beizadea reflected in its main character, Pestriț ("Mottled").

Sturdza abandoned his studies in Berlin in February 1843, without getting his diploma. With Russian acquiescence, he finally moved to Paris later that year, and was tasked with continuing his legal studies. Upon relocation, the Beizadea became an honored guest of literary salons. It was in Paris that he began an affair with a female novelist, Gabrielle Anne "Countess Dash", who was 18 years his senior and married. One version of the story is that young Sturdza obtained from her a pledge that she would marry him and follow him to Moldavia. Other accounts claim that his father was informed of his matrimonial intentions, and recalled him to Iași before a wedding could take place. Beizadea Grigore returned to Moldavia in 1844. During March of the next year, his father appointed him as junior caretaker of the Moldavian schools, assigning him the task of supervising education reform and prevent egalitarian ideas from seeping in; Grigore never showed up to be sworn in. At the time, Dimitrie had been successfully recruited into the administration, serving as Hatman (commander general) of the princely militia. As reported by Girs, Prince Mihail allowed his other son a "ministry of his choice", but Grigore left immediately, "dissatisfied with the stipend that his father would allow him." Instead, he "decided to get rich quick" by combining investments in leasehold estates with a protection racket. Acting as a "feudal lord, under laws of his own creation", he also established a private army of Arnauts, threatening with physical harm all those who would oppose him, including judges. After a celebratory visit to Neamț Monastery, Grigore asked to be allowed an extended vacation on his father's estate of Perieni. In early 1845, he was joined there by Gabrielle Anne, having informed his father that they were to be married; Mihail advised him to wait.

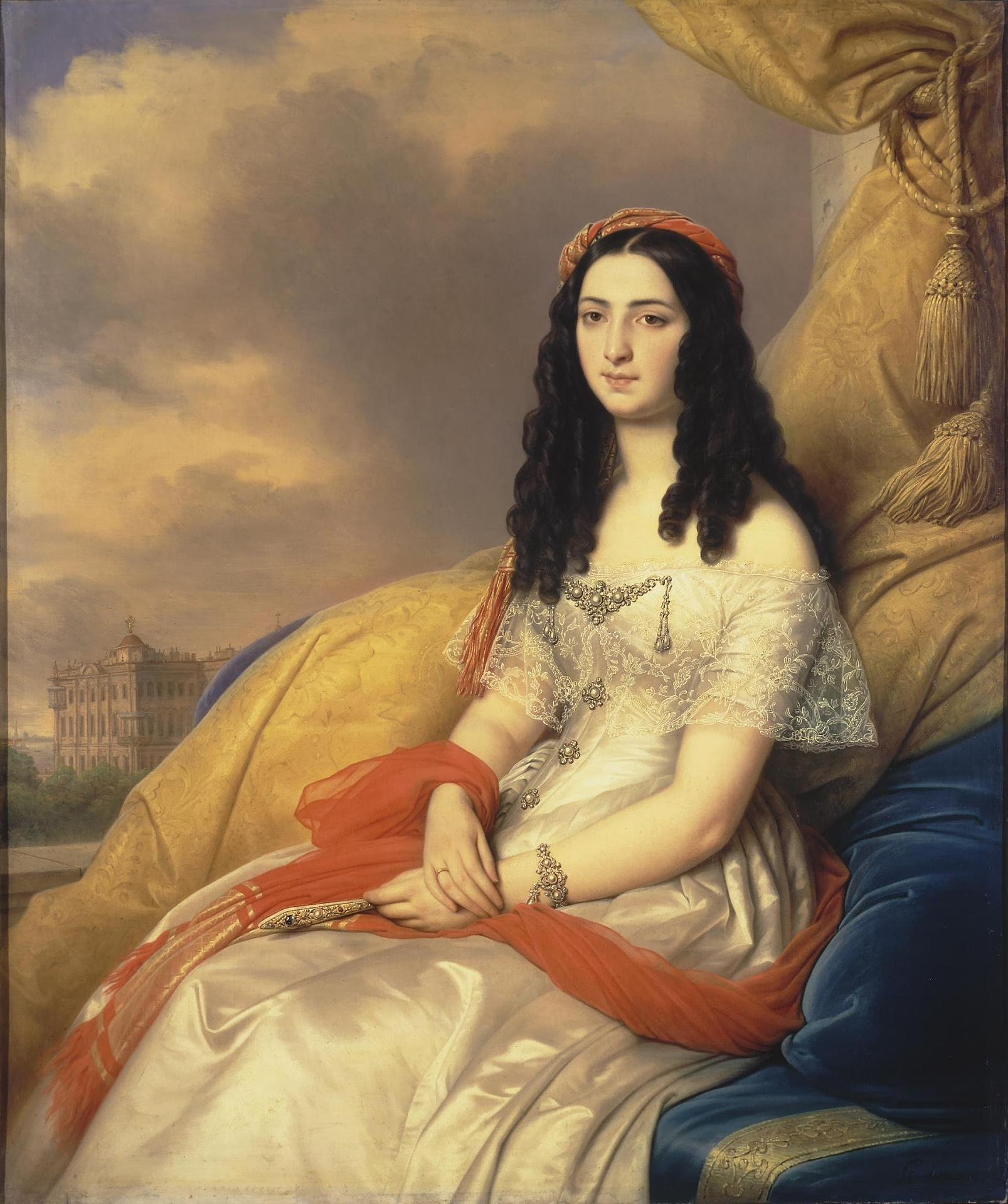
The Countess Dash in 1844 (oil painting by Charles de Steuben)

Grigore feared that this was an attempt at stalling. As reported by writer Constantin Negruzzi, who was a personal witness to the events, he held the Perieni priest at gunpoint, forcing him to perform a ceremony in his father's absence, and without his approval. Dash had been formally baptized into Eastern Orthodoxy (the Moldavian Metropolitan Church), taking the name of "Diana". Her baptism and wedding were reported to the Moldavian Metropolis, which proceeded to nullify the latter act, effective on May 9, and informed the Price of his son's doings. The national scandal which erupted turned international, once it became apparent that Countess Dash was a bigamist under French law. The French consul, François Duclos, stepped in to persuade the couple that the marriage was not legal, but found himself confronted by the Beizadea, and unable to answer the Countess' observation that she was no longer a French national, nor a Catholic. In June 1845, French Prime Minister François Guizot personally weighed in, informing Gabrielle of the risks she was taking upon herself. The Beizadea replied for her, telling Duclos: "It astonishes me so very much, Sir, that Mr Guizot should take such an interest in my love life. He would be well advised to handle his own ministry, which he has been handling very poorly." Presented with another scenario, namely that his brother's militia could storm into Perieni and arrest him, Grigore announced that he and "my sharecroppers" would fight to their deaths. He continued to defy his father by taking hold of the estate revenues of Perieni and Neamț Monastery.

The Prince retaliated by ordering his military not to allow Grigore into Iași, and Moldavian boyars to stay out of Perieni. Memoirist Gheorghe Sion reports that eventually, in September 1845, 200 Uhlans, forming Moldavia's full cavalry force, rode into Perieni. The Beizadea barricaded himself inside the princely compound, where he expected to withstand the siege alongside a group of trusted Arnauts. Lacking provisions and deserted by his servants, he rode out of Perieni "on his wildest steed", armed with a carbine, a sword, and four pistols. The Uhlans never chased after him, focusing instead on disarming the Arnauts; they also arrested Countess Dash and escorted her to Mamornița, forcing her to cross into Austrian Galicia, never to return. Duclos provides a different narrative, according to which the Beizadea had simply grown tired of the Countess, and had her sign a "convention" ending the marriage; in both his and G. Sion's version, the conflict ends with Grigore asking for the Prince's forgiveness. Yet another account is that the Beizadea had been made aware that the Countess was having an affair with her cousin, the Count Tanneberg, and that he personally escorted both of them to Switzerland in November 1845. A notice originally published in Kölnische Zeitung that December noted that Sturdza and Dash had "dissolved their marriage by mutual agreement", and that he was set to marry one of Ivan Paskevich's daughters.

In 1846, Dash and her cousin were living in Como at the Beizadea's expense. The latter was still flaunting sexual mores with his escapades, and, as recorded by his father's secretary Nicolae Șuțu, had to undergo specialized treatment for his venereal diseases. He had returned to his activities in agriculture, employing agronomist Alecu Kulici and Ion Ionescu de la Brad on the land he leased in Săbăoani, and giving them access to "the secrets of all lucrative speculation in both Principalities." C. Sion reports that the Beizadea now had a criminal gang made up of young boyar upstarts such as Dumitrache Stan (allegedly a Wallachian Rom), Costache Roată, Dumitrache Stat, and the forger Petrache Kozmiță. During 1847, a commission formed by the Beizadea, alongside boyars Strat and Stan, was tasked with investigating the timber trade of Dorna-Arini, Suceava County. They found that the yeomanry was being exploited by a cartel of foreign merchants, including Greeks, Turks and Jews, and wrote off much of the village debt.

=== 1848 Revolution ===
Despite such acts of generosity, the Beizadea was mostly known for his outstanding cruelty. Writer I. C. Severeanu reports that Sturdza not only kept Romani slaves, but actually shot and killed one of them for oversalting his soup. Sion describes the young Sturdza, "that famous thief", as "heartless, cruel, unmerciful, and so very wolfish". As Ionescu reported, the Beizadea had a plan of taking in his care "all the estates of Roman County", to emerge as the "elephant" of Moldavian agriculture. Sturdza also began holding land to his own name: at Cristești, he used, and sometimes lived in, a giant durmast oak with a view of the Ceahlău Massif.

At the time, Sturdza also became interested in projects of sea and river commercial navigation. At some point in the 1840s, he helped document the history of shipping by procuring an engraving showing 15th-century Moldavian sailboats, which survived in a reproduction by Gheorghe Asachi. By December 1847, Sturdza had become a supplier for the European grain trade, in lucrative relations with firms and employees from the Kingdom of Sardinia. Initially, he tried to undercut the markets of Galați by acquiring his own merchantmen—two brigantines, manned by Sardinians. He then worked with specialized retailers from the Pedemonte House, but failed to honor his obligations, and was taken to court. The incident became an international scandal after Moldavian courts ruled that Sturdza was owed reparations and legal fees by Pedemonte.

As noted by genealogist Mihai Dim. Sturdza, it remains an issue of contention among his colleagues whether Sturdza was ever legally married to Countess Dash. Sturdza's second marriage, reportedly arranged by his father, was to the Wallachian Olga Ghica. By most accounts, she was the daughter of the Wallachian intellectual Mihalache Ghica, making Grigore a brother-in-law of writer Dora d'Istria. However, as reported by Girs, Wallachians were generally aware that Olga was the natural daughter of former Governor Pavel Kiselyov, and a Ghica only by adoption. The couple were wed in Bucharest, the Wallachian capital city, on March 1, 1848. Sturdza's first wife was reportedly devastated by these developments—in a letter to her, the Viscount d'Arlincourt presented his sympathies for her loss, and encouraged her to keep writing as a remedy. She reflected on her relationship with Sturdza in her 1848 novel, Michaël le Moldave. Here, he appears as "Michaël Cantémir", while Dash herself is the ethnic Romani maid Chiva; historical facts are modified to suggest that Sturdza had been forced to choose between his passion and the needs of his countrymen, since marrying Chiva would have made him ineligible for the throne. The novel was translated into Romanian by Theodor Codrescu and already published in that version in 1851.

All Sturdzas were involved in quelling the attempted revolution of April 1848. Dimitrie was nominally in charge, as Hatman, but, as recounted by Radu Rosetti, Grigore, being "more energetic and competent", personally supervised the revolutionaries' arrest and mistreatment. Dressed as a Russian Polkovnik, he was the subject of a derisive remark by one of his victims, Alecu Rosetti: "Vous êtes magnifique et pas cher!" ("You are quite magnificent and not at all expensive!"). The same is noted by diplomat N. B. Cantacuzène (son of the revolutionary figure Vasile Canta). He writes that "Grégoire Sturdza, son of the Prince" masterminded the ambush of Colonel Alexandru Ioan Cuza and other regime critics inside Iași's Casimir House. Other reports suggest that Grigore ordered his troops to shoot all prisoners, but that his order was vetoed by his brother the Hatman. Grigore is believed to have similarly handled the arrest of another young revolutionary, Manolache Costache Epureanu; Kogălniceanu had also joined the revolutionary movement, but escaped into exile. He reportedly maintained an "overt and implacable dislike" for the Beizadea and, before his departure, accused him of having defrauded Neamț Monastery of "no less than forty thousand ducats". In May, Alecsandri also referred to Grigore in a revolutionary manifesto, describing the "tyrannical tortures" of peasants on his leased estates. Alecsandri also claimed that Sturdza's Arnauts had ransacked boyar homes, stolen precious clocks owned by Georgios Kantakouzinos, and mistreatead prisoners.

Overall, Prince Mihail sought to maintain a political course that would allow reform without resulting in a Russian punitive invasion. He was himself expelled from the country due to a Russian veto, which some, including Stokera, believed was possibly prompted by Grigore's "bad behavior". In 1849 he was living at the Bogoridis' hôtel particulier in the 7th arrondissement of Paris. Around that time, Dimitrie signaled his definitive retirement from public life, settling in Dieppe. He had married a distant relative, Catrina Sturdza, with whom he established a family branch in France. An absentee landlord over large estates in Moldavia, he relied on the Jewish entrepreneur Mochi Fischer to handle his affairs, a matter which contributed to peasant strife over the next 60 years. Grigore's own lease on the village of Borca, part of the Slatina Monastery lands, was highly controversial after Moldavian Poles, who acted as his proxies, pushed locals into debt servitude. Immediately after his father's ouster, the peasants stopped making payments and issued formal complains. The matter was investigated by Lascăr Catargiu, at the time the civil inspector (Ispravnic), who found that Sturdza had indeed disregarded law and custom.

=== Crimean War ===
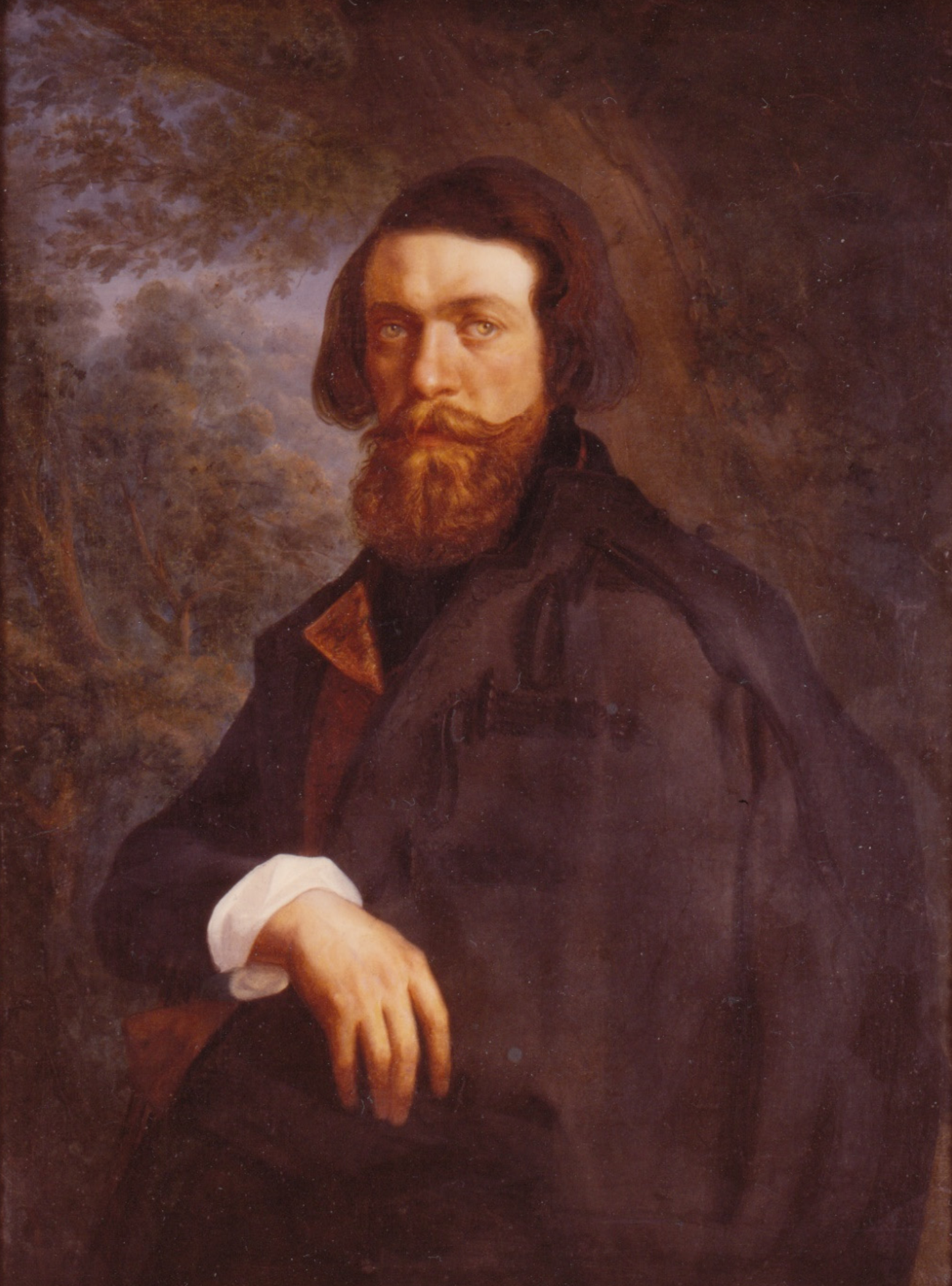
1850s portrait of Beizadea Sturdza, attributed to Wilhelm von Kaulbach

By the time of the revolution, Beizadea Grigore had focused on his military career, and held a general's rank in the Moldavian militia. Building on his personal friendship with Reşid Pasha at the peak of Tanzimat reforms, he transferred to a Colonel's posting in the Ottoman army in 1852. As Muklis Pasha (also Muhlis Basha and other variants), Sturdza was assigned to the Turkish Cossack cavalry in December 1853, some two months into the Crimean War. This unit was also set up to include Wallachian revolutionary deportees, to whom the Porte had granted partial amnesty. Sturdza fought with distinction in Wallachia, beginning with the Battle of Oltenița; he was then involved in the engagements at Cetate, displaying "rather insane courage" as a mounted sniper, who took aim at enemy officers while fired upon by the Russian artillery. He also ignored his superiors' orders and, in August 1854, made a trip to Russian-abandoned Bucharest, where he found his wife's home "almost spared of bullets and robbers."

Historian Adrian-Silvan Ionescu claims that, in order to join the Ottoman Army, Prince Grigore Sturdza converted to Islam. However, Simion-Alexandru Gavriș, who wrote a biography of Sturdza, claims that the name Muhlis Pasha was a nom de guerre, and that he remained a Christian during his entire service. Sturdza was accused of becoming a Muslim when he returned from the Ottoman service by the newspaper Steaua Dunării. While Sturdza didn't deny the claim himself, Constituționariul, which was close to the Sturdzas, supported the claim that it was solely a nom de guerre, not a renounciation of the Christian faith.

During Sturdza's service under the Ottoman flag, Moldavia had come under Russian occupation. The country's Finance Ministry defined Sturdza as an enemy combatant, and moved to confiscate his entire personal wealth—comprising Cristești and Cozmești, which were then sold at auction. In his later career, Sturdza lamented the Principalities' failure to involved themselves on the anti-Russian side, arguing that they missed out on an opportunity that was seized upon by Sardinia. He viewed the conflict as essential in effecting Italian unification, and proposed that a more visible Romanian engagement could have similarly resulted in Moldo-Wallachian unification. Among the revolutionaries, Golescu-Negru viewed Sturdza's presence in Ottoman ranks as indicative that the Porte was favoring conservatives; his cousin Golescu-Albu similarly referred to Sturdza as a "bad memory", also suggesting that he had hampered his group's attempts at propaganda in Europe.

Sturdza networked with the pro-Ottoman Wallachian Ion Ghica, but the two split in February 1854. The Beizadea reportedly preferred to associate with the better positioned Ion Heliade Rădulescu. Around June of that year, the Beizadea had permanent contact with other Wallachians, including Gheorghe Magheru—who knew him as Pașoalca ("The Little Pasha"). Reportedly, he tried to intrude in revolutionary affairs, warning Magheru that Ion Ghica was a Russian spy. Also exiled for his participation in the Moldavian attempt, Ionescu de la Brad informed Ghica that the Beizadea was a libeler. Ghica himself had fond recollections of partying with Sturdza in Istanbul. His letters refer to Pașoalca's birthday, which doubled as a celebration of Romanian nationalism: they "listened with our ears and our souls" to a performance by the Lăutari.

Oriental Army of the Crimean campaign by Gustav Bartsch. From left to right: Admiral Ferdinand-Alphonse Hamelin, Lord Lucan, Lord Raglan, Admiral Dundas, Sir John Campbell, Duke of Cambridge, Lord Cardigan, Ismail Pasha, Omer Pasha, Muhlis Pasha (Grigore Sturdza), Sultan Abdülmecid I, Said-Bey (Vasile Obedeanu), Ahmed Pasha, col. Desmaret, Marshall Baraguey d'Hilliers, Prince Napoleon, col. Trochu, Marshal de Saint-Arnaud, general Bosquet, general de Canrobert

On the Wallachian front, Sturdza served under Michał Czajkowski, an Ottoman Cossack general and, originally, a member of the Polish revolutionary diaspora. Czajkowski hoped that the war would continue in Bessarabia, and viewed the Moldavian Sturdza as an asset in that scenario, recommending him to serve on the Ottoman General Staff. The Beizadea was forced to resign soon after, for unknown reasons—Czajkowski's correspondence suggests that he was under investigation for unknown reasons: "I was summoned to give in writing where I got to know [Sturdza], who I recommended him to, how he behaved, how he was treated and everything I know about him." Sturdza himself was having "very spirited altercations" with Omar Pasha, and once prepared for a military standoff by having his own tent converted into an arsenal. This resulted in his replacement with Sefer Pasha. Sturdza was then reassigned to a section of the Danube army, under Halim Pasha. In early 1855, he was moved to the main front, seeing action at Eupatoria and finding himself advanced to the equivalent of a Brigadier General; he was also aide-de-camp to Omar Pasha. From this position, he also fought in the Siege of Sevastopol. A lithograph by Gustav Bartsch and Johann Hesse honors his profile as a warrior, showing him (under the name Mouhlis Pacha) standing near Sultan Abdulmejid I, who is riding a steed.

The Russians withdrew from Moldavia in 1854, leaving the Austrians to administer both Principalities as a buffer zone. The following year, an Austrian spy known as "Flavius" expressed concern about the growth of support for Sturdza in Wallachia, and claimed that he was being prepped to take over as Wallachian Prince. In May 1856, "Muklis" joined the Ottoman diplomatic mission tasked with implementing the Treaty of Paris in respect to Southern Bessarabia (which had been returned to Moldavia). Russia's envoy Michel Fanton de Verrayon protested against this appointment, since Sturdza was a Moldavian national, arguing that he could not be impartial on the territorial issue; the Porte stood by Sturdza. The Commission president, Charles George Gordon, was much displeased with Sturdza's arrival, noting that he was being quarrelsome and created additional hurdles in settling the border disputes.

In his diplomatic capacity, Sturdza protested against the evacuation of Danubian Cossacks and their property from Bessarabian localities. He also boasted, to an incredulous audience, that he had personally obtained more territory for Moldavia in Bolgrad County. Sturdza himself returned to his native country and was reconciled with the new Prince, Grigore Alexandru Ghica. Under this regime, he finally renounced his claim to the Pedemonte reparations (September 1856). The Russian side had repeatedly refused to deal with Sturdza as a commission member, noting that he was a deserter from their ranks. Kogălniceanu welcomed the news, seeing them as proof that Russians had a good understanding of Sturdza's character: "this man will also desert from the Turkish colors, as he has done first with the Moldavian colors, and then with the Russian colors."

For his role in the war and diplomatic negotiations, Sultan Abdülmecid I, awarded Sturdza the Order of the Medjidie, Second Class.

=== 1858–1859 election ===
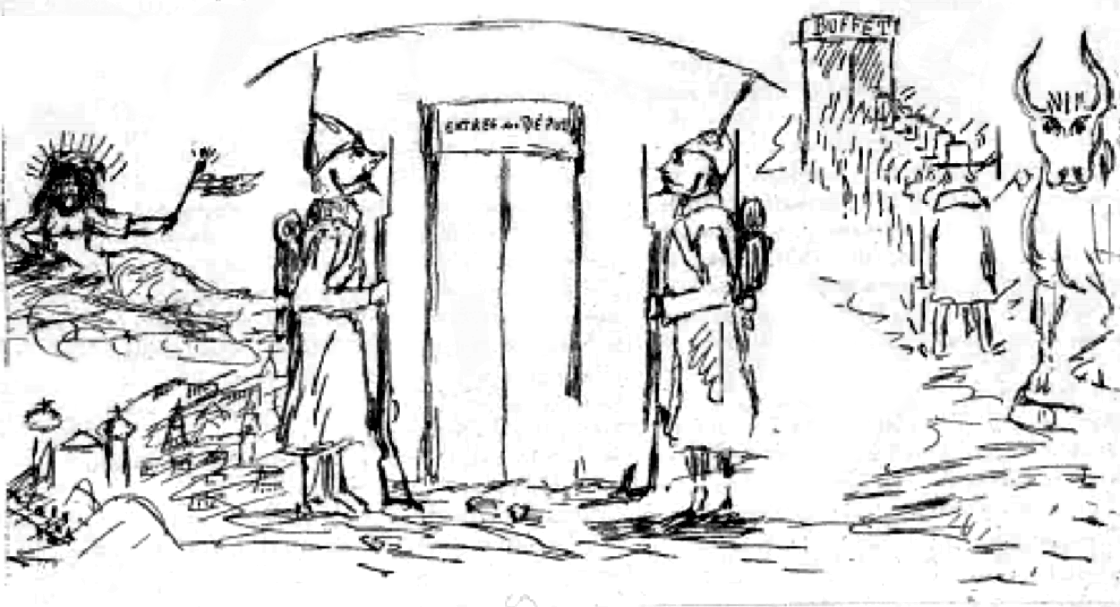
Henric Cortazzi's satirical doodle of the Moldavian Ad hoc Divan in December 1857

Samples of diplomatic correspondence indicate that, in July 1856, the Beizadea had real chances of being appointed Caimacam (regent) of Moldavia, losing only narrowly to Teodor Balș, himself replaced in February 1857 by Bogoridi's son, Nicolae Vogoride. In April 1857, at Iași, Sturdza handed the final act on Moldavia's frontier to Vogoride. The waning of Russian influence now allowed room for the National Party, which supported a political unification of Moldavia and Wallachia, and their emancipation as an independent country. In 1855, this group opened a Masonic Lodge in Iași, which, by 1857, was secretly debating candidacies for the Moldavian throne. Grigore Sturdza's support by the great boyar families was seen as an obstacle by the Nationals, who regarded him as a "Phanariote"; while the group was adamant that they would never support Sturdza, they remained for a while divided between putting up Alecsandri and Costache Negri as their rival candidates.

Arriving into the country dressed as a Pasha, Sturdza Jr presented himself as an alternative to both his father's "retrograde party" and the "ultra-radical democracy" of National activists. His political reference, by that moment, was Bonapartism, with Sturdza appearing as a Moldavian version of Napoleon III; he promised unification with Wallachia, but only within the very loose norms stipulated under the Treaty of Paris. In April 1858, "Muklis" finally announced his candidacy for the Moldavian throne in the election of December. There were initially eight candidates, including himself and his father; Grigore was entered into the race by Anastasie Panu, who was serving as one of the three Caimacams who had taken over from Vogoride. In November, the Journal de Constantinople retrospectively noted: "Mouhlis-Pacha (Prince Grégoire Stourdza), one of the more fidgety candidates, who thought that he had quite a few chances, has lost them all following the arrival of his father". A retrospective note in Louis Debrauz's Mémorial Diplomatique suggests that Sturdza Jr had left Moldavians with "too many irritating and upsetting memories". As part of his effort to persuade the public, the Beizadea organized a team of electoral agents from his Polish retinue, who also maintained a connection between him and Czajkowski.

The Beizadea was intent on obtaining recognition by the Second French Empire. In September 1858, while presenting his resignation from the Ottoman army, he addressed Napoleon a letter which expressed commitment to unifying the Principalities into a French-allied polity; he also co-ordinated his efforts with Wallachia's outgoing Caimacam, Alexandru II Ghica, whom he met in the border town of Focșani. Sturdza Jr also recruited the Frenchman Jean Alexandre Vaillant, who put out a Sturdzist brochure that was read with interest by the French Foreign Minister, Alexandre Colonna-Walewski. As noted in various diplomatic records, the Beizadea enjoyed discreet backing by the French Consulate in Iași. More senior affiliates included C. Sion, who was primarily noted for his anti-union writings, supporting "the rights of Moldavia as a state in its own right." Additional backing came from the newspaper Constituționariul, which was put out by Constantin Hurmuzachi and Grigore Balș, and which took up the "conservative" label as a self-designation. As recounted by Hurmuzachi, this coalition was formed only after Muklis' intense networking, which also saw him reconnecting with Ionescu de la Brad, who was by then a socialist. Hurmuzachi insisted that they had disagreements, especially after Sturdza had voiced his nostalgia for the Phanariotes and had issued only a mild critique of Vogoride; "we avoided discussing union [under] a foreign prince."

Unlike Mihail, Sturdza Jr wanted to also take a seat in the Ad hoc Divan during the concurrent legislative election. As an Ottoman serviceman, he found his candidacy rejected by the Fălciu County tribunal, but could still win a seat in Iași County. He was finally validated by the Divan deputies, 32 votes to 20. Both Sturdzas, who ran their respective princely campaigns from the Roznovanu House (Mihail) and the Lozonschi Street villa (Grigore), were eventually rejected by a majority of delegates in the Divan. As noted by historiographer Daniel Clain, in this initial phase there were 30 deputies pledged to the Nationals, while Mihail and Grigore Sturdza had 21 and 13, respectively. The former group did not necessarily doubt that the Sturdzas also supported union, but still noted that "under no circumstance" could either of them take the throne. Vaillant, who had earlier supported the Nationals, believed that the Beizadea was an objectively better and more moderate candidate, who could also serve as Wallachian Prince. He also argued that Mihail Sturdza was a "separatist", tainted by his association with Vogoride. Officially, Sturdza Jr rallied to the nationalist platform of union, declaring that he himself would only vote for a unionist. This statement is seen by historian Petre P. Panaitescu as hypocritical: "In fact, he was going to cast a vote for himself and could only do so as a separatist candidate, who had no supporters in Wallachia."

The Nationals held primaries at the Grecianu home, in front of an elephant skeleton, with a long series of runoffs; the Beizadea absented. As Hurmuzachi recounts, the "democrats" within the National Party, who would only back a non-boyar, were frustrated in their attempt, and threatened to vote for the Beizadea. This move was curbed by Costache Rolla, who locked the door from the outside, and forced those inside to agree on a single candidate, namely the 1848 revolutionary Cuza. As detailed by historian Nicolae Iorga, Cuza was only allowed to run because of conspiratorial maneuvers by Colonel Pisoski, who "issued threats, gun in hand, in the doorway of the debating room, should Cuza's candidacy be rejected. Had it not been for him and his pistol, for his presence at the very entrance of that room, we would have seen the election carried by Mihai[l]-Voivode or by Beizadea Grigore!" The Nationals now had 32 deputies, while the Sturdzas, by then, had 16 each; during the actual voting procedure, which took place at Grecianu, Cuza took an additional 16 votes from both his adversaries. Overall, Cuza's victory could happen "only because of the persistent conflicts between father and son", particularly since "the partisans of Beizadea Grigore were absolutely irreducible, no promise and no enticement could ever get them to vote for Mihai[l] Voivode." Cuza himself was guided by a sense of justice, and, against National Party deputies (including Epureanu), openly defended the Beizadea's right to take a seat in the Ad hoc Divan.

At that final stage, Radu Rosetti reports, Mihail was conceding defeat and tried to transfer Grigore his votes. While he was simply defeated, Grigore found himself removed from the list of candidates, his status as an Ottoman serviceman being widely seen as incompatible with princely status. Debates continued over his eligibility as a Prince, prompting deputies to thoroughly review the conditions set in Paris. A majority of 35 deputies, including those loyal to his father, voted not to admit him into the race. Other delegates, in particular those of the clergy, abstained from voting once they realized the Beizadea could not win. The Beizadea himself absented from the vote which confirmed Cuza.

=== Polish plot and Central Commission ===
Immediately after the election, Sturdza Jr and Panu reemerged as Cuza supporters. The former raised the idea of a Cuza candidacy in Bucharest "before anything official had been stated on this issue". Both he and Panu wrote articles hinting that Cuza should invade Wallachia and seize the throne in Bucharest; Strudza's piece saw print in the National Party mouthpiece, Stéoa Dunărei. Cuza's subsequent election in Wallachia effectively federated the two countries, as the "United Principalities"; he was crowned Domnitor in both capitals. "Muklis" went on public record with his praise of the union as "something worthy of Romania's most glorious times", asking that both Divans meet for a common session in Focșani. More secretly, he began to organize for resistance. The National Party's V. A. Urechia claimed that young Sturdza being furious of his father's interference, which had prevented him from swinging the "old boyar" vote. He reports that the former Pasha intended to use his Ottoman connections to prevent Cuza from ever gaining international recognition, and also that he was arming "vagabonds", ready to "storm into that Mr Cuza's palace".

Various other sources suggest the existence of a Sturdzist plot against Cuza. Definitive information suggests that he could rely on some 1,200 Poles, answering to Nieczuia Wierzbicki, were gathered on Sturdza's estates, with 6,000 more expected to join in from Wallachia and elsewhere. The Russian consul in Moldavia, Sergei Popov, noted that some partisans of "Grigore Mukhlis" had already been found in Bucharest, where they worked to undermine the possibility of a double election. Sturdza's coded letter to Czajkowski suggests that he wanted to appoint himself Caimacam through bribery, for which he intended to open a credit line with Antoine Alléon's bank. A January 1859 report by British Consul-General Henry Adrian Churchill notes Sturdza's resentments, and also alleges that he was pondering an open rebellion. According to Churchill, the troops Sturdza had pledged for Cuza's seizure of Bucharest were in fact mutinous and self-interested; they would have included Poles who viewed the Principalities as a stepping stone toward recovering Congress Poland. Rumors of such intrigues resulted in a temporary clampdown on Polish revolutionary cells in Moldavia: 23 Poles were arrested and 11 convicted during a trial which saw Sturdza appearing as a witness. An English Masonic agent, William Solioms, was also detained in connection with this intrigue.

The Moldavian press published reports according to which Wierzbicki was tasked with a sweeping social reform, as well as with the mass assassination of Moldavia's political elite, in order to set the stage for Sturdza as "prince of Romania". Sturdza himself rejected the rumor in an open letter carried by Stéoa Dunărei, but it was largely confirmed by Poles taken into custody. Scholar Juliusz Demel also reports that the plot was factual, since Czajkowski intended to carve Dobruja out of the Silistra Eyalet and set it up as a "good base of training Polish insurgents", with Ottoman acquiescence. This would have made the area "an uncomfortable neighbour for the Romanian state". Some details are disputed by historian Panaitescu, who proposes that, since Romanian and Polish nationalism coexisted in symbiosis, "such an action that would go against the true interests of the Polish people [...] would in any case be unexpected." As he argues, the Polish groups supporting Sturdza were at most representatives of the Polish monarchist movement, and, in their relations with him, primarily agents of the Ottoman Empire.

In February 1859, Mémorial Diplomatique published a letter from Bucharest, which claimed that Sturdza, whose designs for a coup resembled "mental alienation", was being held under watch by the authorities; it also alleged that the Beizadea had managed to escape. During those same days, Alecsandri wrote that the attempted coup was "much more reduced than we were told"; however, as leader of the repression, Moldavian Colonel Fote made a conscious attempt not to inform the public about the scale of the conspiracy. In September 1859, Sturdza was released with no charges being pressed—Iași's Criminal Court dismissed the interrogation of Polish suspects as only producing hearsay about Sturdza himself. According to Panaitescu, the Beizadea only escaped imprisonment because, at that early stage, Cuza was unwilling to strike at the "great boyardom". Cuza scholar Dumitru Ivănescu suggests that Sturdza was rendered "harmless" by Wierzbicki's arrest; the regime had no interest in finding him guilty, since such a verdict would have created more division.

Official records for that same interval point to Sturdza as a Cuza loyalist: during January–April 1859, he rallied with the Divan deputies who voted for a property tax and an international loan in order to balance Moldavia's budget and create a unified army. Sturdza then served on the Principalities' Central Judicial Commission, based at Focșani, whereby he introduced legislation which contained the first-ever Romanian references to "human rights". At this stage, Sturdza veered back into conservatism, instigating a veto against electoral reform. As he put in his opinion, voiced on June 2, 1859, any change in the suffrage would authorize government to dissolve the Moldavian and Wallachian assemblies and hold early elections. The same month, Sturdza and another Commission member, Constantin N. Brăiloiu, argued that Regulamentul Organic was still a source of constitutional power—this interpretation was deemed manipulative even by other members of the conservative right, including Ioan Emanoil Florescu. As noted by historian A. D. Xenopol, the Beizadea effectively rendered into legal jargon the boyar program: "the party of the past simply did not want to extend voting rights so as to preserve its control on stately affairs". Sturdza was noted for refusing to congratulate Cuza on his birthday, as well as for rejecting any suggestion that the Commission owed its mandate to the Domnitor.

The Commission proceedings also witnessed Sturdza's advocacy for calling in a "foreign prince" to rule over the Principalities. He veered to the right more than other members: in his legal reading, Cuza was only legitimate "for as long as Europe will not send us a foreign prince"—a phrasing which appeared, almost identical, in the constitutional project submitted for approval by the commission. Their claim was ridiculed by Cuza's leading Moldavian partisan, Kogălniceanu, who read in it traces of Sturdza's spite (paraphrased as: "I couldn't be a reigning prince; well then, neither will you"). In September 1859, however, he agreed with Cuza that the Commission needed to work on solving "the question between landowners and villagers"—by which Cuza actually meant a major land reform.

=== "Monstrous coalition" ===
Unlike other Moldavian delegates on the commission, Sturdza fully supported establishing the national capital in Bucharest; as he put it, Iași was both insufficiently bourgeois and insufficiently Romanian. He then stood in the Romanian Assembly of Deputies, representing the right-wing opposition to Cuza's egalitarian policies. As noted by Xenopol, he was the "most progressive" right-winger, endorsing public schooling, mass recruitment, and the land value tax, as well as an increased salary for the Moldavian Prime Minister, who was by then his nominal rival Kogălniceanu. In January 1861, he objected as other conservatives passed a motion of no confidence against Kogălniceanu's administration, arguing that the accusations of corruption brought up against the head of government were unfounded. Sturdza's flirtation with liberalism ended when it came to land reform—as the "landowners' main champion", from May 1862 he was an outspoken opponent of attempts to dispossess boyars and the gentry at the benefit of peasants. He upheld a rival project provided for common land in rural communities, with family allotments of, at most, 15 square kilometers. Attempting to solve peasant destitution by other means, he set up his own lands in Iași County to function as model farms, introducing fallow techniques that more than doubled the expected output. He continued to live as an aristocrat—in 1861, he dueled with, and killed, Costin Vârnav over a dance-floor scuffle.

As early as 1861, Sturdza had declared his astonishment that Cuza never selected Wallachia and Moldavia's still-separate cabinets from the respective majorities, noting that this habit prevented Romania from joining the ranks of "constitutional states". He preserved his oppositionist stance following the creation in early 1862 of a unified cabinet, headed by the Prime Minister of Romania. In December 1862, he joined Panu, Barbu Bellu and 29 other deputies in signing a letter of protest against Prime Minister Nicolae Kretzulescu, which actually criticized the Domnitor. Sturdza was persuaded that Cuza was turning to dictatorial means such as changing governments "with each season" and asking civilians to carry out illegal orders.In February 1863, he asked for Negri, who was Cuza's diplomatic agent and Sturdza's former rival in the princely election, to be prosecuted on such grounds. Also then, he made a point of reminding to the Assembly that the Ad hoc Divans had pressed for union under a foreign-born prince as "the wish of an entire nation." This stance was rejected by deputy Nicolae Rucăreanu, who claimed that "if the nation has voted for a foreign prince, it was because this option was imposed on it by the intelligentsia, and not by its own senses." Sturdza's attack on Cuza was also regarded as tactless by the ultra-liberal "Reds". Their doyen Ion Brătianu suggested that, under the circumstances, Romania could only find herself ruled by "some Moskal or Austrian prince, or by some Turkish pasha".

As argued by the anti-boyar journalist Bogdan Petriceicu Hasdeu, Sturdza was behaving insincerely, since he was viewing himself as a likely replacement for Cuza. In April 1863, this was also noted by Kogălniceanu, who was at the time serving as head of the national cabinet. He spoke about Sturdza as a man of genius, and implied that for this very reason his attempt to gain the throne needed to be resisted—the implication was that the Beizadea was exceptionally equipped for subverting the Principalities' new liberal order. Late that same month, Petre Mavrogheni began campaigning for a Sturdza cabinet to replace Kogălniceanu's, but the project was fully abandoned in June. The Beizadea expected to be backed by the French Empire, but found himself isolated. France's Foreign Minister, Édouard Drouyn de Lhuys, passed it on to Cuza that he "knew nothing about prince G. Sturdza's political value".

These events unfolded in the context of a Polish–Russian civil war, which also rekindled Polish activities in Wallachia and Moldavia. In July 1863, the Bessarabian town of Coștangalia witnessed a skirmish between 400 Polish volunteers, recruited by Czajkowski and Zygmunt Miłkowski, and Romanian regulars, who had orders to stop their advance into Russia. After Miłkowski's subsequent arrest, Cuza's men speculated that the Beizadea had a part to play in the affair. The rumor was partly validated by Gorchakov, who spoke of Sturdza as leading a "common action of the Polish and Romanian revolutionaries." During November 1863, Sturdza and George Barbu Știrbei welcomed in Bucharest Panu, the chief of Moldavia's anti-Cuza movement, who was to supervise their "monstrous coalition". At around that time, a French diplomat, Pierre Baragnon, had contacted Miłkowski, prodding him to form a Polish Ottoman army that would depose Cuza and redivide the country, placing the Beizadea on the throne in Iași. Miłkowski dismissed the offer, later clarifying that he wanted no part in "dissolving the unity of Romania". The Panu group publicized a program which incorporated most of the "Red" agenda, endorsing decentralization, press freedoms, and an extension of voting rights with literacy tests; it also provided for a selective land reform with the full abolition of the corvée.

In January 1864, Cuza responded to Sturdza's maneuvers by calling on Ilfov County's "peasant militia" to deploy in the city's streets. Reportedly, this caused both Sturdza and Știrbei to end their conspiracy and leave the country. "Before they left for Paris," they reportedly sent a letter to Cuza's left-wing adversary, C. A. Rosetti, demanding to know why he, as leader of the "Reds", could not prevent the hostile alliance between the urban masses and the armed peasants. During February, however, Sturdza acquiesced to Cuza's projected land reform, offering to contribute money for the compensated dispossession of monastery estates. Returning from Paris later in 1864, he approached the "Red" politico Dimitrie Brătianu, who may have acted as a liaison between anti-Cuza conservatives and Polish revolutionaries. Others however knew him as a partner in Moldavia's Russophile circles. In May 1864, Ioan Dabija claimed to speak for the Bessarabian Romanians as loyal subjects of the Russian Emperor. He rejected reunification with the Principalities, on the grounds that Romanian politicians were incompetent and evil. The few exceptions, Dabija argued, were "good patriots" like Sturdza, Lascăr Catargiu, and Dimitrie Ghica.

=== 1866 events ===
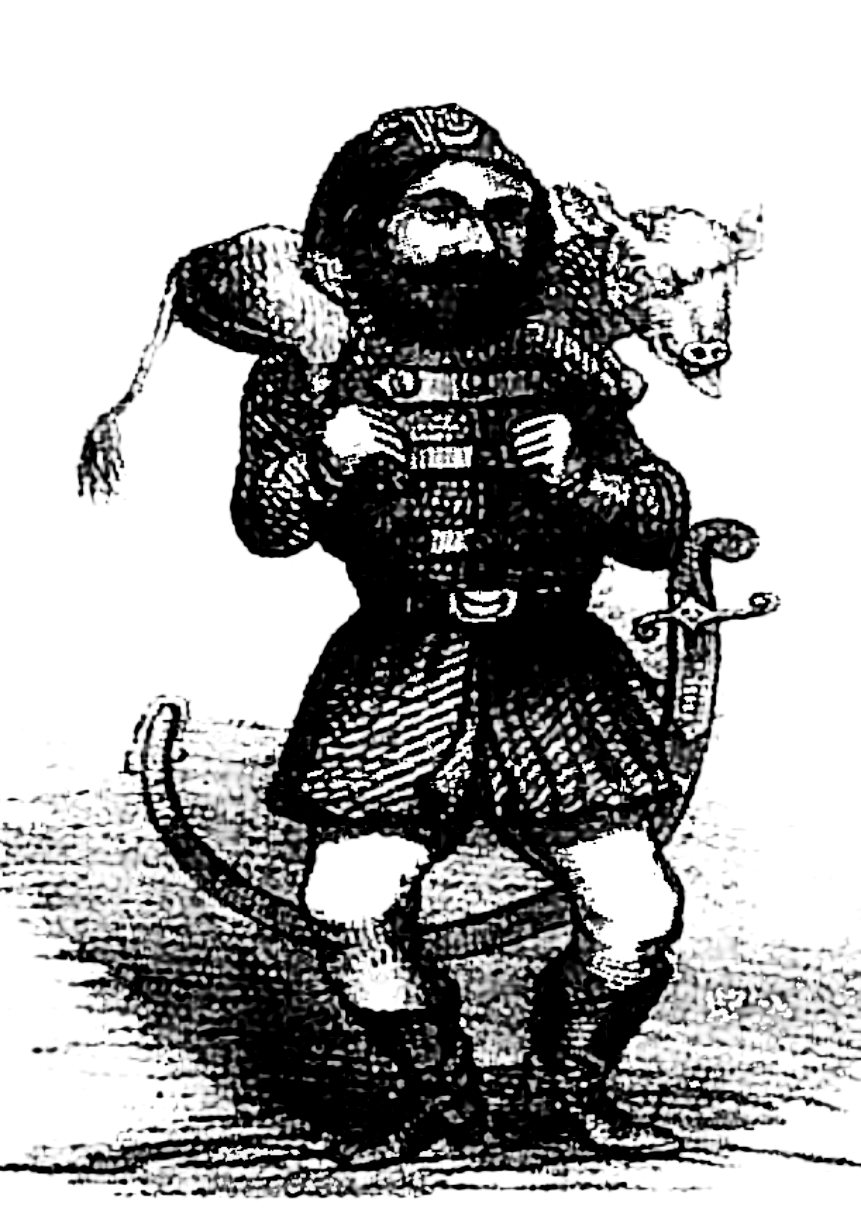
Caricature of Sturdza in Ottoman uniform and exercising with his calf, in Bogdan Petriceicu Hasdeu's Satyrul (April 1866). This illustrated a ditty: De unŭ omŭ pré-tare, mĭ-e frică, / Fie chĭarŭ și dintre noĭ: / Cine pe-unŭ vițellŭ ridică, / Facă-se Domnŭ între boĭ! ("For as much as they're our clan, / I shun being ruled by strongmen: / If he lifts a calf for fun, / Let him rule among the oxen!")

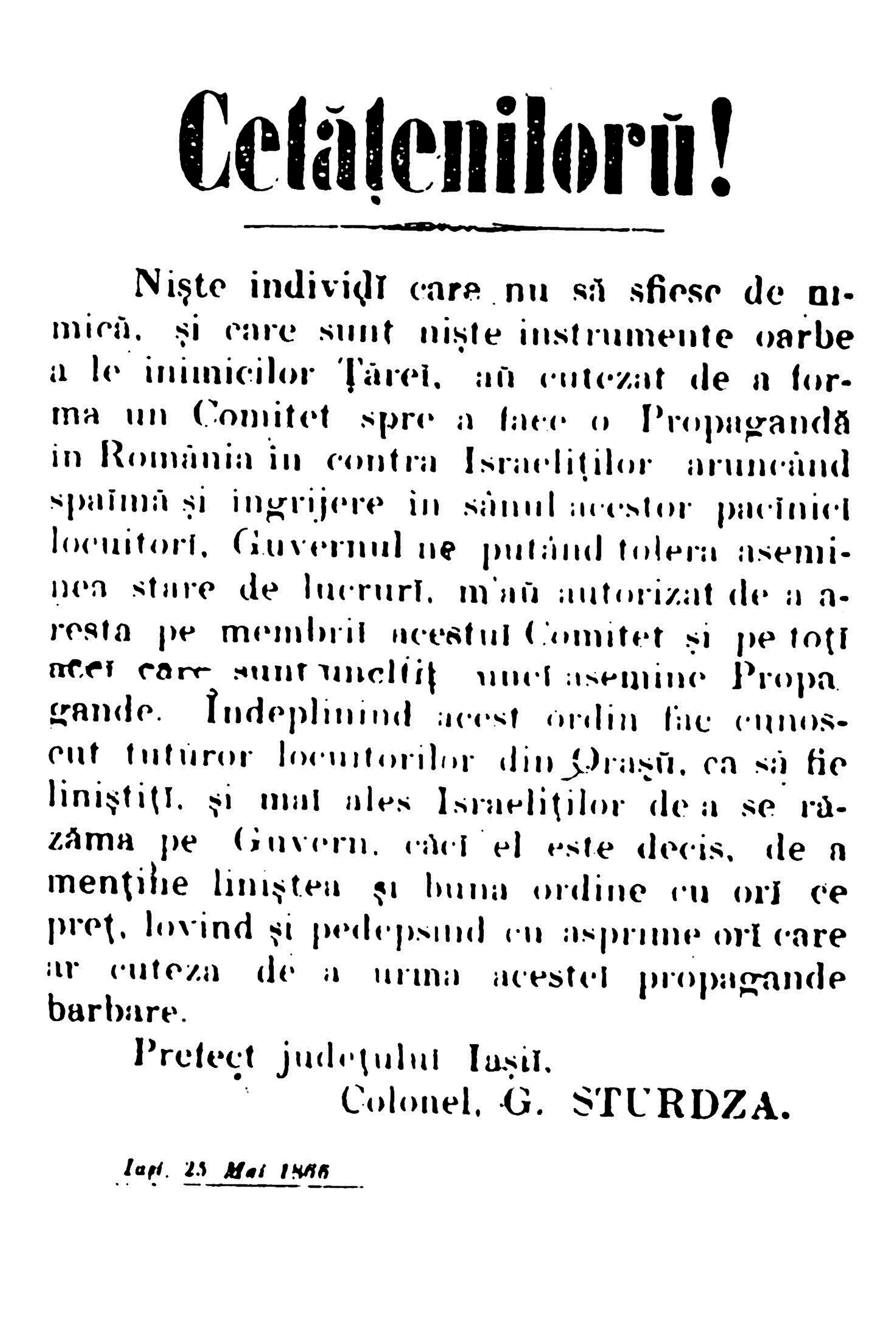
Sturdza's proclamation upon retaking control of Iași in May 1866, condemning the "barbaric propaganda" of local antisemites

The political unrest was briefly ended that same month by Cuza's self-coup. In August 1865, at a time of mounting discontent, representatives of this regime allegedly raided Sturdza's home in Perieni, "but without success." Cuza's reign was finally brought to an end by the "monstrous coalition" counter-coup of February 1866. Over the following months of unrest, Romania (as the Principalities were now formally known) selected Carol of Hohenzollern, a Prussian subject, as their new Domnitor. His predecessor's abdication created the terrain for active separatism, which was promoted by Russia's agents in Moldavia. An April report in the Transylvanian press had it that "prince Gregoriu Sturza, under the condition of a foreign prince, has renounced his candidacy, but under other circumstances he will use any means to see himself on the throne."

As noted by Radu Rosetti, some of the boyardom dreamed of restoring independence, "but they were mostly old men, with no energy left for accomplishing dreams of youth. The only one who still had the required energy and willpower, Beizadea Grigore Sturdza, never even made a move." In March 1866, the Beizadea, having been made a Colonel in the Romanian military, was also serving as the Prefect of Iași County. To the "Reds", he was primarily known as an abuser of the office. In May, this job confronted Sturdza with the Iași separatist riots, which doubled as outbreaks of antisemitic violence; restoring order by military force, he issued a proclamation extending his personal guarantee of safety to the Jewish locals.

Overall, the Beizadea remained sympathetic toward the moderate separatists. In July 1867, he was at Roman, where he signed up to a platform which called for the establishment of a regional Moldavian caucus that would defy "Red" centralism. The document was also backed by Nicu Ceaur-Aslan and Nicolae Iamandi (both of the Free and Independent Faction); other signatories included Grigore Balș, Panait Balș, Grigore Vârnav, and Colonel Pavlov. Their initiative was rejected by the "Red" Prime Minister, Constantin A. Kretzulescu, who argued that regional caucuses were not permitted under the 1866 Constitution. That same month, Gazetta de Iașĭ published the Beizadea's response to Kretzulescu, who had threatened to break up the regionalist rally by force. In it, Sturdza informed the "Reds" that liberal "anarchy" would be swept away by the "great party of Order and Stability"; he also called for a protest gathering to be held in August.

In October, following separatist Teodor Boldur-Lățescu's scuffle with two Wallachian officers, Sturdza signed his name to protests addressed to Carol. Although reaffirming their loyalism, Sturdza and the other signatories demanded that Boldur-Lățescu be tried by an independent court in Focșani. Sturdza also served for a while as Chief of the Romanian Police section in Iași, retiring to a position on the board of Sfântul Spiridon Hospital. His split with C. A. Rosetti was rendered manifest after the election of March 1869, when he introduced a formal motion to have Rosetti sent to a mental hospital. During April, Sturdza presided a delegation which welcomed Carol as he visited Iași; on the occasion, the Domnitor visited with his mother Săftica.

=== "White" politico ===
In January 1870 the Beizadea, backed by 65 Assembly deputies, presented a motion to grant Carol a gift of 300 thousand francs. As reported by opposition papers, this was in fact a disguised gift for the Domnitor's wife, Elisabeth of Wied. In February, the anti-"Red" government coalition, headed by Golescu-Negru, reportedly considered reappointing him Prefect of Iași. The troubled year 1871 signaled Sturdza's political rise as the leader of an arch-conservative caucus. The defeat of conspiratorial "Reds" following incidents known as the "Republic of Ploiești" was consecrated in the May 1871 election. On April 18, Sturdza helped organize the conservative caucus in Iași, which met at his home; it included "about a hundred people", with his former enemy Epureanu as their leader. Addressing the gathering, the Beizadea outlined a plan for modifying the Constitution to solidify Carol's rule and ensure continuity. These ideas were also embraced by Epureanu and Iacob Negruzzi, who also spoke on the occasion—the latter's address was perceived by journalist as an endorsement of absolute monarchy.

Speaking for the "Political Committee of Conservative Liberals", Sturdza publicized this "Iași Petition", which caused anger in liberal circles, and concern among some of the conservative "Whites", with its demands—including not just a reduction of voting power for the lower classes, but also colonization by Germans and the death penalty. In presenting the argument for the latter, Sturdza noted: "Under Prince Mihail Sturza, after they hanged a few robbers, personal security became absolute and there were no more cases of either robbery or murder." As noted by political scientist Apostol Stan, the document was in effect a program for "more or less a personal rule" by "White" Prime Minister Catargiu. This initiative also brought the first clashes between Sturdza and the cultural society Junimea, which was turning into a political faction, and which counted Negruzzi among its leaders. According to memoirist George Panu, at that stage Sturdza "never absented" from the literary conferences presented in Iași by Titu Maiorescu, the Junimea doyen, and "greatly enjoyed" Negruzzi's work in political satire. Sturdza however insisted that the Petition be signed by all right-wingers in the Assembly; Junimist deputies, also based in Iași, only agreed to sign parts of the document.

Used by the opposition to ridicule the "Whites" (Telegraphulŭ newspaper referred to Sturdza and his colleagues as "boyars, parvenus of the regime, and scoundrels" who had unmasked their reactionary agenda), the Petition was in fact ignored by Catargiu. Sturdza still tried to win over the public with his demands, touring all of Western Moldavia in the summer of 1871. Hasdeu claimed that the concurrent election was overall rigged, since aristocrats such as Sturdza and Maiorescu had been elected by peasant voters in the 4th College; conservative groups also celebrated his personal contribution in ensuring success for "official candidates", though they noted that this was the result of procedures which Sturdza simply upheld. The former Beizadea was himself continuously elected to either the Assembly or the Senate, for all legislatures down to his death.

As a personal friend of Catargiu's, Sturdza was depicted by "Iași's newspapers" as a "most energetic pillar of the party of order and stability on that side of the Milcov." In 1874, the Beizadea's established in Iași a "Landlords' Club", which was probably co-founded by Epureanu. Its creation was received with alarm by Ionescu de la Brad, who noted that Sturdza was mostly interested in using a nominal association of agricultural interests for his political scheming. Rumors rendered by Ionescu suggest that Sturdza had created himself an appendant body of Freemasonry, and that many inductees quit upon realizing that they were being used. Overall, only a minority of the club's members could be counted as property owners. Mostly used for dance parties, it became "only from time to time, and for a few days on end, a political and conservative club." Another one of Sturdza's leading passions was in constructing early flying machines. In 1875, he used his father's Lozonschi house as a hangar for his glider. A friend of his, a gymnastics professor known as Spinzi, attempted to pilot it from a tower in Cristești, but the launch ended in failure. This remains one of the earliest documented fixed-wing flight attempts by a Romanian, between those of Constantin Nestor (1765) and Ion Stoica (1884).

Sturdza had by then renounced his claim to the Romanian throne. As recalled by Radu Rosetti, Sturdza spoke very favorably of Carol, and spent time vacationing with him in Sinaia. During one such outing, Sturdza sought to impress local peasants by pummeling a rock into small pieces—his performance was not appreciated by the monarch, who found it to be in bad taste. Carol was again in Iași in October 1875, with Sturdza as his host. Tensions between the various "White" factions became evident during the elections of that year, which Catargiu lost to the consolidated "Red" opposition, or National Liberal Party (PNL). Sturdza and his associate Ceaur-Aslan voiced their displeasure when Junimea was co-opted by Catargiu to strengthen "White" chapters in Moldavia; however, Sturdza agreed not to run in the 3rd College at Iași, leaving it to be contested by the Junimist Petre P. Carp, and instead ran for the 4th College at Fălciu. As noted by Stan, the subsequent conflict between Carp and Sturdza prevented the "Whites" from forming a unified caucus that would compete with the PNL. In February 1876, ahead of government-mandated repeat elections, the Beizadea made a public show of his anti-Junimism, also breaking with Catargiu to present himself as an independent candidate in Iași's 2nd College. By 1878, both Sturdza and Kogălniceanu had set up independent groups that competed for the Moldavian vote. The Beizadea was Chairman of the Moldavian Conservative-Liberal Party, while his Lunéville colleague presided upon a Moderate Liberal Party. The two groups formed an alliance for the local elections at Iași, in November 1878.

=== National-Democratic leader ===
Sturdza adopted controversial stances during the Romanian War of Independence, which saw Romania aligned with Russia against the Ottomans. In order to obtain recognition for its separation from the Ottoman realm, Romania had to consider emancipating its non-Orthodox residents; and enduring controversy focused on the extent of Jewish emancipation. Sturdza sided with Conservative Generals Gheorghe Manu and Ioan Emanoil Florescu. They proposed that naturalization could only be fast-tracked in individual cases, and with an Assembly supermajority. Upon the end of the war in 1878, Romanians were faced with a Russian demand to relinquish southern Bessarabia, in exchange for Northern Dobruja. Nationalists were generally indignant, and Carol threatened to abdicate during February 1878; as reported by Politische Correspondenz, this suited Russia, which had Sturdza as its favorite candidate for the throne. The issue was settled in Romania's detriment by the Treaty of Berlin, which was signed in July 1878. Over the following months, Sturdza was acknowledged as a proponent of Balkan federalism—though not necessarily of a Balkan state to include Romania.

During the late months of 1879, Sturdza and his followers were at the center of a renewed controversy over Moldavian separatism and Russian influence. In October, a Russian diplomatic report referred to the Beizadea as the leader of a "Moldavian party", implying that he was interested in rekindling Moldavian secession. Historians Gheorghe N. Căzan and Șerban Rădulescu-Zoner rate Sturdza's speeches of 1879 as "propaganda for a Russian–Romanian rapprochement", arguing that he "still craved to obtain the crown with support from the Tsar." On December 1, Sturdza created a publicized row in the Senate by refusing to endorse Ion Brătianu's PNL premiership, and in particular Brătianu's address on the state of the nation. In his response, he outlined the "conservative program" as a political alternative, and discussed instances of voter suppression. Responses to this message were mixed: Pressa, as the mainstream "White" newspaper, agreed with his core stances, but rejected his approach to foreign affairs; C. A. Rosetti's Românul ignored Sturdza's claim that the speech represented only himself, and ridiculed it as a sample of "operetta" conservatism.

In February 1880, "Whites" coalesced into a more centralized group, the Conservative Party. Sturdza refused to join the movement, upset that the party leadership went to Epureanu; he was also opposed to the mainstream chapters in that he had become a Russophile, wishing for Romania to be brought into the orbit of Tsarist autocracy. Instead, he established a "minuscule political faction", the "National-Democratic Party", which put out its own daily, Democrația Națională, which promoted Republican ideas. Its few affiliates included a Wallachian soldier, Christian Tell, who stayed with Sturdza for a few months, serving as the party's Vice President before he eventually deserted to the Conservatives. Democrația Națională's editor was Grigore H. Grandea, previously noted for his anti-Russian stances; other associates were lawyer Petre Borș and journalist Milone Lugomirescu. During the National-Democratic episode, Sturdza paid for a state-modeled personal bureaucracy, which included hiring a retired police captain, Gheorghe "Păpușică" Florescu, to run a private information service.

On March 3, 1880, Sturdza attempted a show of force, speaking in the Senate against the validation of Alecu D. Holban. Ion Ghica noted that the display, attended by Florescu and his men, was overall weak, as was Sturdza's speech. On June 2, National-Democrats held congress at the Romanian Atheneum, braving crowds of opponents gathered outside that building. There as well as in the Senate, Sturdza outlined the National-Democratic platform, which included devolution to Local Assemblies and a plan for the in-depth defense of Romanian territory. Another rallying point for the Beizadea's followers was their opposition to electoral reforms—Sturdza argued that the suffrage was already extensive, and that further enfranchisement would result in a tyranny of the majority. From January 1881, the group also made show of its opposition to the Germanophile line embraced by the Junimists, and thereafter by the Conservatives. Democrația Națională's agenda was also poorly reviewed by Pressa who mistrusted its self-designated centrism. Instead, Pressa argued that the National-Democrats stood for "all that is old and extremely old", "reemerging now, after a 50-year rest in the realm of oblivion" as advocates of "Slavic nationalism".

In December 1880, Ion Pietraru made an unsuccessful attempt on Brătianu's life, which police presumed to be part of a wider conspiracy implicating Sturdza and Russia—several party members, including Grandea, were arrested, though Sturdza vouched for their innocence. Shortly after, a pseudonymous Romanian nationalist in Bessarabia published an open letter, arguing that Sturdza was sponsoring Grigore Hrisoscoleu to deny Bessarabia's Russification. The Pietraru incident put an end to Democrația Națională, officially because of Sturdza's anger that his journalists had insulted Brătianu and other figures of the PNL administration; the party was also dissolved, in 1881. In that context, Sturdza explained that he had grown fonder of the PNL, which had shown itself open toward a Romanian–Russian alliance. Though briefly detained as an alleged Pietraru accomplice, Captain Florescu resurfaced in public life as a PNL member. Commenting on his reconversion, memoirist Constantin Bacalbașa notes: "It is a well known fact that most of Prince Grigore Sturza's confidants were bought off by government. This is what made this party, which existed only because of Beizadea Grigore's ambition, disappear within 24 hours."

According to writer Constantin Gane, Democrația Națională's alarmist messages about Romania's standing in Europe pushed the PNL establishment into reestablishing the country as a "Kingdom of Romania"—whether to increase the government's prestige or to "uplift the country". Eugene Schuyler, as the first US diplomatic agent in Romania, wrote on March 26 that there was a chance of Sturdza returning to his "posing as a pretender to the crown. While many families thought their members had rights to be princes, no one can have the pretention to be King." Four days later Schuyler reported that: "The step has been accepted, if not thoroughly approved, by the members of the foreign reigning families, some of whom took part in the act." As an example, he cited Mihail Sturdza being welcomed into the Order of the Star of Romania by Carol. From May 1883, Beizadea Grigore served in Dimitrie Ghica's commission for constitutional revision.

=== BZD Club ===
In January 1882, Grigore Sturdza was being labeled a "Slavophile" by the Austrian press, which reported on his "conventicles" of Iași in connection with a visit by Miroslav Hubmajer, known for having fought in an anti-Austrian rebellion in 1875. The Beizadea remained unrelenting in his critique of Brătianu's foreign policies, exposing Austria-Hungary for using the Danube Commission to limit Romania's navigation rights. His speeches drew attention from a Junimist poet-journalist, Mihai Eminescu. In an 1882 piece, he declared his admiration for Sturdza's "so very clear, so very beautiful" Romanian oratory, stripped of neologisms and verbosity. Eminescu mused that the effect of using "good, direct, informal Romanian", or what he termed the "old language", was like introducing pagans to Christian music by Palestrina.

In the elections in October 1888, Sturdza took a senatorial seat in Iași's 1st College, having run on the joint list presented by the PNL and the Radical Party. Upon confirmation, he embodied the right-wing opposition to Conservative governments. Allegedly, by 1887 he had joined the group of politicians who supported the project of Bulgarian–Romanian unification, and "toasted to its accomplishment with one of our great dignitaries of State." In his November 1888 speech before the Senate, he declared that the merger of Conservative and Junimists had produced first an experimental cabinet under Theodor Rosetti, and afterwards a non-representative one under General Manu. He also argued that Romania would be better off in an alliance with Russia and the French Republic against the German Empire (see Franco-Russian Alliance), insisting that Germany and its Triple Alliance were fundamentally weak. In May of the following year, he attacked Brătianu and General Brialmont's plan for fortifying Romania's plain cities, noting that the only naturally defensible stronghold was at Focșani. He also contended that Romania was helpless in front of a Russian invasion, advising government to declare neutrality and grant safe passage to the Russian armies. Between 1891 and 1895, under a new Catargiu cabinet, Sturdza and his followers, collectively known as the BZD Club (from Beizadea), formed an uneasy alliance with the Conservatives, openly stating that they preferred Manu for the position of Prime Minister.

Grigore and Olga Sturdza did not have a happy marriage. He never saw himself bound by matrimonial fidelity, and continued to keep, and brag about, his seraglio that, at any time, comprised twelve concubines; commenting on this "harem", Cantacuzène noted that "customs and decency did not exist for this Sturdza prince". A widower after June 1867, Sturdza was reportedly married to another woman for some 6 months in 1874—this resulted in the birth of a son whom he did not recognize as first, and who took the name of Dimitrie Pavelescu. The Beizadea finally married Ralu Turculeț, who was reportedly a Romani woman who shocked aristocratic sensibilities with her "garish clothes and makeup". Olga had given birth to three children, all of whom died very young. A son, Dimitrie, was born in May 1856; he died before turning 16, from what was reported as a cold or a case of typhoid fever. The couple also had two daughters, Elena and Olga. The latter, noted for her unusual physical strength, had married Emanuel Vogoridi in January 1876. She became fatally ill with pneumonia after bathing in the Siret River. Elena, married with Mihai Sturdza Bârlădeanu, died in childbirth—doctors found that she was physically damaged by a routine of calisthenics, which Grigore had imposed on her in the belief that it would ease her pregnancy.

The family patriarch Mihail Sturdza died in his Parisian exile on May 7 or 8, 1884. This resulted in a legal battle between Grigore Sturdza, Dimitrie Sturdza, and Maria Gorchakov. As reported by Le Matin, the latter two had conspired to defraud Grigore of his inheritance. The Sturdza civil trial began in 1891 and was taken to the Court of Cassation in 1893, and again in 1897. An initial ruling by the court of Galați commanded Gorchakov to pay her stepbrother the equivalent of 5 million United States dollars, and to transfer him the Sturdza vacation residence in Baden-Baden. As reported at the time: "The judgment financially ruins the princess." This was partly upheld in March 1898, when an appellate court in Amiens ordered Goncharov to pay Sturdza 800,000 Dutch guilder in damages. The Beizadea was also fighting for the recovery of his lands, those that had been nationalized in 1854. In 1883, he had obtained a compensation of 500 thousand lei and interest, which he found unsatisfactory. An appellate court in Iași eventually ruled that his dispossession had been an act of war, and therefore that he could only be compensated by a parliamentary vote.

Despite his lifelong conservatism, the Beizadea was being courted by the PNL's conservative wings. In 1884, he and the PNL's Eugeniu Stătescu sought to introduce a law whereby acts of lèse-majesté would be tried in ordinary courts—a polemic ensued between them and C. A. Rosetti, who supported complete freedom of speech. During the final days of 1885, "a political rally was held in prince Gr. Sturdza's salon at Iași", which confirmed that he and his followers "adhered to the policies of the prime minister [Brătianu]." In November 1887, rumors began surfacing that Sturdza was offered chairmanship of the PNL's Iași section. In the following decade, however, the BZD sought to reaffirm its independence. In the by-elections of May 1895, held for the 2nd-College seat in Iași, it scored a surprise win for its candidate, Nicu Catargiu. According to the left-wing newspaper Lupta, in July 1895 it branched out in Bucharest, counting on support from Constantin Creangă and his rolling paper factory. The same source reported that the Bucharest club merely intended to defraud the Beizadea, who had pledged them a 1-million-lei sponsorship.

=== Retirement ===
In late 1889, Sturdza and Kogălniceanu joined the central committee of the Liberal Democratic Party, established by D. Brătianu against his brother's PNL. The Beizadea was finally attracted into the PNL during the general elections of November 1895—at the time, the group was turning right-wing under the chairmanship of a relative, D. A. Sturdza. Sturdza and his BZD partisans presented themselves on the PNL list for the Assembly, which effectively ended their prospects of ever returning into the Conservative fold. With 171 votes, he was the third winner on the PNL list for Iași's 1st College, behind Ștefan C. Șendrea and Toma Stelian. In early 1896, Sturdza and his followers tried to mediate between PNL leaders and the breakaway faction of Nicolae Fleva: "The Beizadea keeps pleading for reconciliation, since he is very much keen on maintaining his prevalence at Iași." As reported by the opposition newspaper Epoca, by early May 1898 the PNL majority had pledged 1.5 million lei to Sturdza, as compensation for his 1854 expropriation. Epoca noted that this was in fact a "baksheesh". The same source also reported that, later that month, the Beizadea was attempting to rejoin the opposition, since the other Sturdza would not honor his promise. He still had his own thoughts on European affairs, and in December 1896 insisted that "Romania should find support in Russia". This remark was disputed by Foreign Minister Constantin Stoicescu, who noted that the country needed to remain neutral in the Oriental crises. The Beizadea's political irrelevancy was signaled in 1898 by cartoonist Nicolae Petrescu Găină, who depicted him as an Ottoman relic, adding the caption: "He was once something, what can he be now?"

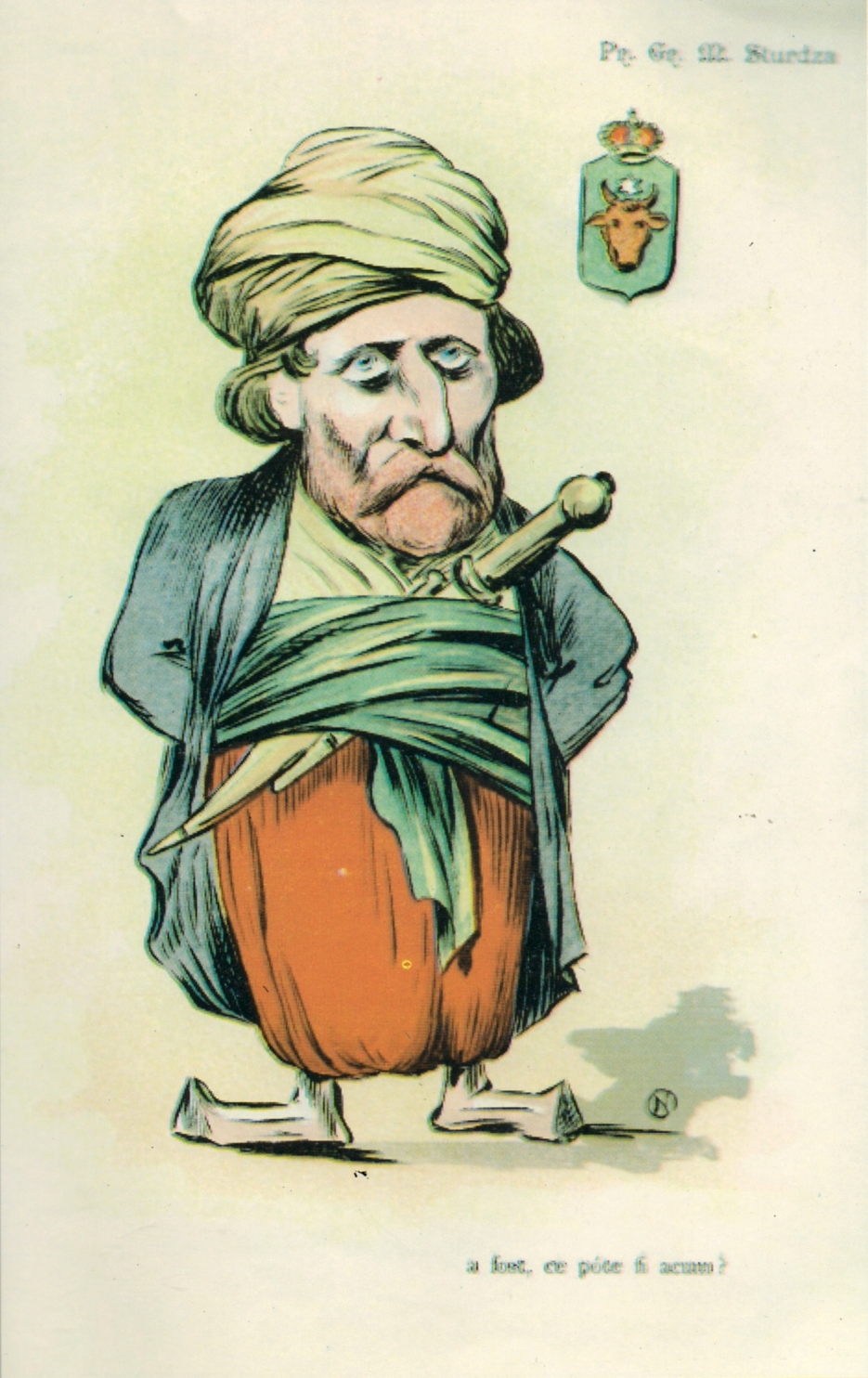
Nicolae Petrescu Găină's 1898 caricature of Sturdza

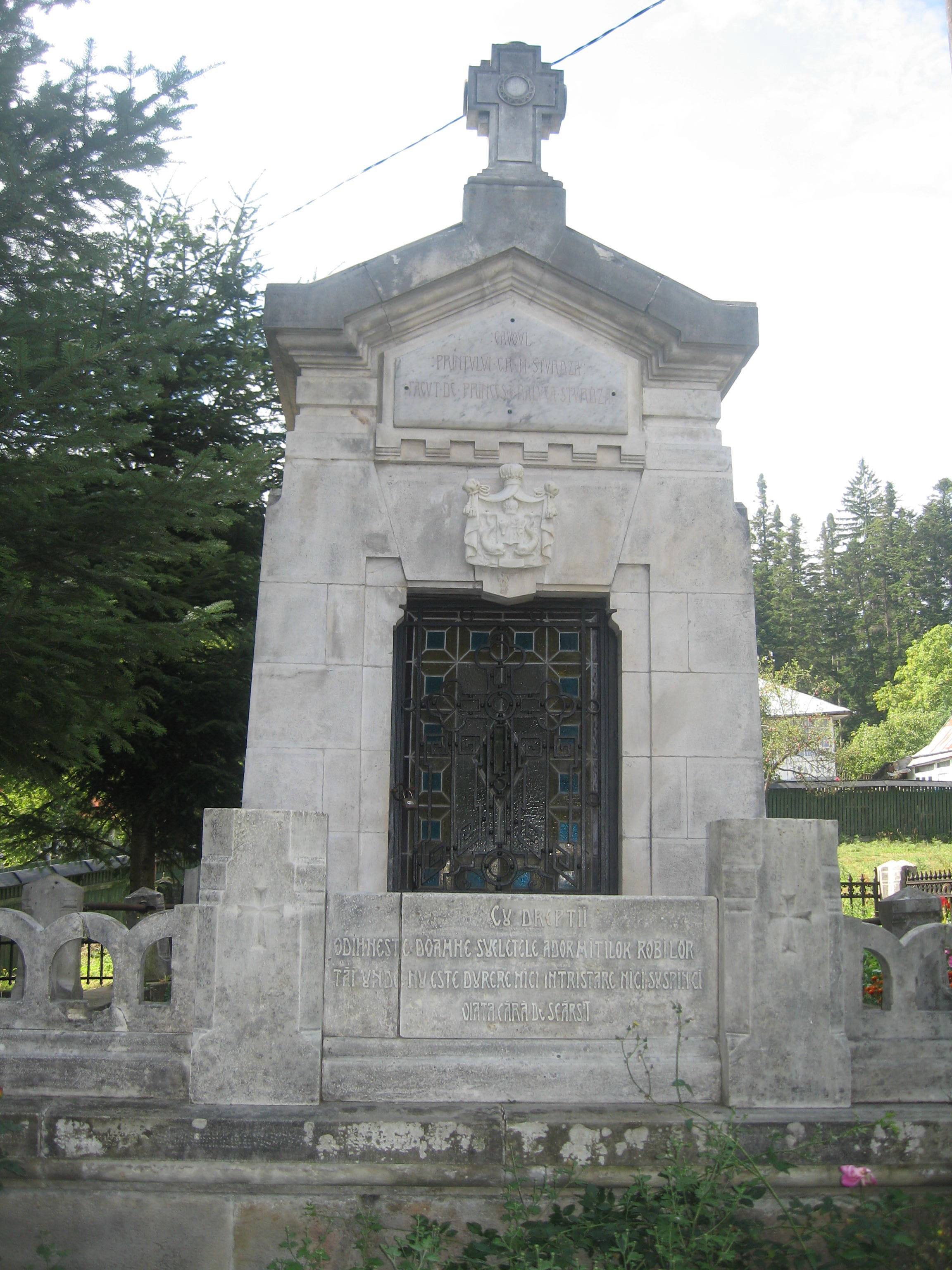
Sturdza's grave at Agapia Monastery

According to Radu Rosetti: "In his youth, Beizadea Grigore passed for a Neronian character; we, those who met him towards the end, never had that impression". He recalls his 1894 visit to the Lozonschi villa, which the Beizadea had fitted with massively oversized furniture. The building, he notes, was "in a state of ruin". According to Cantacuzène, Sturdza "lived in the only wing that was still holding together", a state of decay that was also noticeable in his retinue: Sturdza had "a dilapidated carriage, driven by a coachman in a threadbare livery that was too long and too wide for him". Political writer Mariu Theodorian-Carada recalls a chance meeting with Sturdza at Hotel Carol in Constanța, in July 1891. He was struck by the former Pasha's "mahogany beard" and 1870s clothes.

The Beizadea's final years were mostly dedicated to experimental science, leading him to become a founding member of the Société astronomique; as reported by Klumpke, he had since taken a degree from the École normale supérieure, studying under Louis Pasteur. Over thirty years, Sturdza investigated the "fundamental laws of the Universe", producing the eponymous tract Lois fondamentales de l'univers (1891). Though described by scholar Barbu Berceanu as "perhaps the only systematic encyclopedic work with just one author, a Romanian", it was allegedly ghostwritten in part by a professional astronomer, Constantin Căpităneanu, who died in 1893. A sequel, L'Ordre moral ("Moral Order"), also outlined his philosophical inquiry about the "ideal religion". Overall, Sturdza's ideas on such topics were admired by Camille Flammarion, the French astronomer and parapsychologist, garnering a more ambiguous response from physicist Jacques Babinet. One of the tenets of the books was a hypothesis on astrochemistry, with Sturdza calculating "that there are ninety-three nonillions of trentillions of atoms condensed in the eighty million stars, or altogether one-hundred and eight-six nonillions of trentillions of atoms".

Sturdza also continued to work in designing flying machines with "cardboard wings" which he infamously tested by peasants living on his estates, who suffered broken limbs as a result. An "airplane of his own design" was assigned to be driven by "one poor Gypsy, who got killed on his first attempt". In 1891, he was still passionate about flying, and theorized about the coming age of motorized aircraft. Sturdza's theories and experiments extended to the opera, seeing him as a critic of Richard Wagner's "dissonant and deafening music". By 1879, he had authored several fantasias, with motifs from Gaetano Donizetti and Gioachino Rossini. As reported by Lisbon's Diário Illustrado, the works were "simply impossible to perform" and "cannot be found for sale anywhere in Europe".

Sturdza did however play chamber music with his Junimist friend Alexandru Grigore Suțu, and invented an instrument that was reportedly used by the Paris Conservatory. This is probably the "violin-harp", built for Sturdza by Thomas Zach. It had "extra strings made of metal, for resonance". Exhibited at the 1873 World's Fair, "it did not turn out to be the revolutionary novelty they had hoped for. Instead of being larger and powerful, the tone was nasal and blurry." Sturdza was a major art sponsor in his capacity as chairman of the Amicii Artelor Society (1885), which existed as a challenge to Junimea' cultural tenets. In February 1895 the Beizadea was dedicated the poetry volume Excelsior by its sponsored author, Alexandru Macedonski, who had helped popularize Les lois.

=== Death ===
Grigore Sturdza's Palace in Bucharest

Sturdza's fortune grew to immense proportions after lawyer I. C. Barozzi, working on his behalf, discovered that Prince Mihail had hidden some 45 million lei in bullion on his various estates; Grigore was owed a third of this wealth. At some point between 1893 and 1899, the Beizadea bought himself a villa on Bucharest's Calea Victoriei, but never lived in it, finally presenting is to his other lawyer, Constantin Dissescu, for services performed in the family trial. Sturdza also commissioned a German architect, Julius Reinecke, to construct the Sturdza Palace of Bucharest. This building was infamous for its extreme eclecticism and its overall uselessness, its "immense rooms" only meant to be used for racing "a bicycle [Sturdza] had invented", and for various acrobatics. He "barely lived inside the place, after having spent on it more than he could handle." According to Radu Rosetti, the Palace is also a testament to its sponsor's "utter lack of artistic taste". It was the scene of family dramas, which played during the Beizadea's final years. In January 1895, Sturdza forced his adoptive son, also named Grigore, to marry Maria Feodosiev-Cantacuzino. In love with Gizela Boga, the daughter of a shoemaker, he killed his lover, then committed suicide, some three weeks into his marriage. Their daughter, known as Olga Boga (sometimes rendered as Bogza), was subsequently "raised, provided for, and married off by Beizadea Grigore", who also legally adopted her.

Grigore Jr's suicide pushed Sturdza to recognize his other sons by various women, including Lieutenant Dimitrie Pavelescu, who became Pavelescu-Sturdza. This new arrival to the family made national news in August 1896, when he was listed as a victim of the Avramescu–Weintraub usurers' syndicate, who were allegedly aware that his father would honor any debt. During May 1897, the Beizadea sued the Lieutenant to have the adoption canceled. The first such ever case to be heard by a Romanian court, it prompted Pavelescu's creditors to bring up proof of his paternity. Another adoptive son, Mihai, married Valeria, daughter of Junimist poet Veronica Micle; their own son, Grigore M. Sturdza, was noted as a modernist poet. Literary historian Elena Vulcănescu argues that writer and academic Paul Zarifopol, born 1874, may have unofficially been the child of Sturdza and Maria Stamatiu, who was then forced to marry the administrator of Sturdza's manor in Cristești. The Beizadea also had daughters from his extramarital affairs, including one who became the wife of chemist-politician Petru Poni.

When in Constanța, Grigore and Ralu became supporters of the local art movement: they were noted as patrons of the octogenarian actor Matei Millo, who was giving his last-ever performances at an improvised hall. During Sturdza's final months, the couple were frequently seen at the Georgescu Garden in Bucharest, where they watched sketch comedies by Nicolae Niculescu-Buzău and drank "only mazagran". The Beizadea died on January 26 (Old Style: January 12 or 13), 1901. This occurred in his palace on Bonaparte Street, Bucharest, with the ultimate cause of death registered as "double pneumonia", an illness which had consumed him for some 11 days. Aware that the disease was fatal, and "so very proud of his own anatomy", "he asked his physician to perform an autopsy on his cadaver"; reportedly, his final activity was selecting a spot for one of his decorative statues.

== Legacy ==
As Foaia Populară magazine put it, "[Sturdza's] death was much like his life: he died with a light conscience, effortlessly, at peace." The Bucharest funeral of "Romania's greatest-ever philanthropist" involved "the entire capital city, with everyone wishing to display their mourning." Memoirist Rudolf Șuțu additionally notes: "With him we lost the very last gentleman of that fine race of gentleman of the heart, and gentlemen of the mind, standing for old Moldavia. He was a prince not only through his birthright and his blood, but more than everything though his natural intelligence, through his acquiring of a solid culture, through the charms of his great loving heart". The funeral oration was delivered by Macedonski.

Sturdza was survived by his wife Ralu, who soon began a new life as a nun in Agapia Monastery. The other living heirs were Pavelescu-Sturdza, as well as two other adoptive sons (Dimitrie Popovici-Sturdza, Captain Costică Ștefănescu-Sturdza), and granddaughter Olga. These and other relatives inherited his wealth, in accordance with his will, dated September 1895; the Beizadea had wanted his palace to be passed on to the infant Prince of Romania, the future Carol II, but the gift was rejected by his grandfather, Carol I. Not included in this arrangement was another illegitimate son, the artisan Gheorghe Boboc, who sculpted his father's mausoleum at Bellu Cemetery, which also featured a bust of the defunct by Antoine Bourdelle. The legal battle over Mihail Sturdza's inheritance was still ongoing in 1903, by then involving only siblings Dimitrie and Maria.

Similar litigation surrounded Grigore's own estate, which had been much reduced by expenses in the other trial. Journalist Alexandru Sc. Miclescu, who was serving time in Văcărești Prison, claimed to have accessed a more recent will of the Beizadea, and obtained a release on bail in exchange for presenting it. The case was ultimately closed when this document was deemed a forgery. Through Olga Boga and her husband Henri Meitani, Sturdza had a great-granddaughter; in March 1935, she committed suicide, or was murdered by her father, upon the revelation that she had fallen pregnant outside marriage. In 1920, other Sturdzas moved the Beizadea's remains out of the Boboc mausoleum, relocating them to a new grave at Agapia; the surviving cenotaph was vandalized in 1955. Ralu Strudza died at Agapia in October 1914, leaving most of her wealth to charity.

From 1908, the Sturdza–Dissescu villa was entirely rebuilt by Grigore Cerchez as a Romanian Revival structure, and currently houses the George Oprescu Institute for Art History. The family palace in Iași survived its historical era, serving first as an Orthodox seminary and then as head offices for Radio Iași. Another one of Sturdza's palatial homes existed on the Romanian Riviera, at Constanța, until being torn down in 1915. The Romanian Sturdzas, meanwhile, ran into financial difficulty with the upkeep of the Sturdza palaces. The one in Bucharest was overwhelmed by the homeless, and ultimately sold to the Romanian state in 1904, through the intercession of Conservative writer Duiliu Zamfirescu. It came to house the Ministry of Foreign Affairs and it was here that the Treaty of Bucharest was signed in August 1913. After the fall of Bucharest and throughout the second half of World War I, the Foreign Affairs palace was used as a hospital by the Ottoman Army, housing victims of thiamine deficiency. In the early interwar years, the complex was only permanently used by a caretaker, Fr. Ștefănescu, and his family. In late 1933, an annex was demolished to ease access from a neighboring street. Identified as decadent, the main building was slated for demolition as early as 1937, and finally torn down in late 1944. During its final years, it was the subject of a ditty mocking Foreign Minister Victor Antonescu. Its anonymous author quipped that, once "built by a calf", the Palace was destined to house a "bou" (Romanian for both "ox" and "cretin").
