= Cetate =

Cetate ("citadel") may refer to several places in Romania:

- Cetate, Bistrița-Năsăud, a commune in Bistriţa-Năsăud County
- Cetate, Dolj, a commune in Dolj County, the location of the Battle of Cetate
  - Cetate, a village in Cetate, Dolj
- Cetate Stadium AKA Stadionul Cetate (Alba Iulia), a stadium in Alba Iulia
  - Cetate Deva AKA CNS Cetate Deva, a Romanian professional football club from Deva, Hunedoara County which plays in the above stadium
- Cetate, Timișoara, a district in Timișoara, Timiș County
  - Cetate Synagogue, a Jewish place of worship in Cetate, Timișoara

== Other ==
- Battle of Cetate, fought during the Crimean War

== See also ==
- Cetatea (disambiguation)
- Cetățuia (disambiguation)
- Pârâul Cetății (disambiguation)
