= Countess Dash =

French writer (1804–1872)

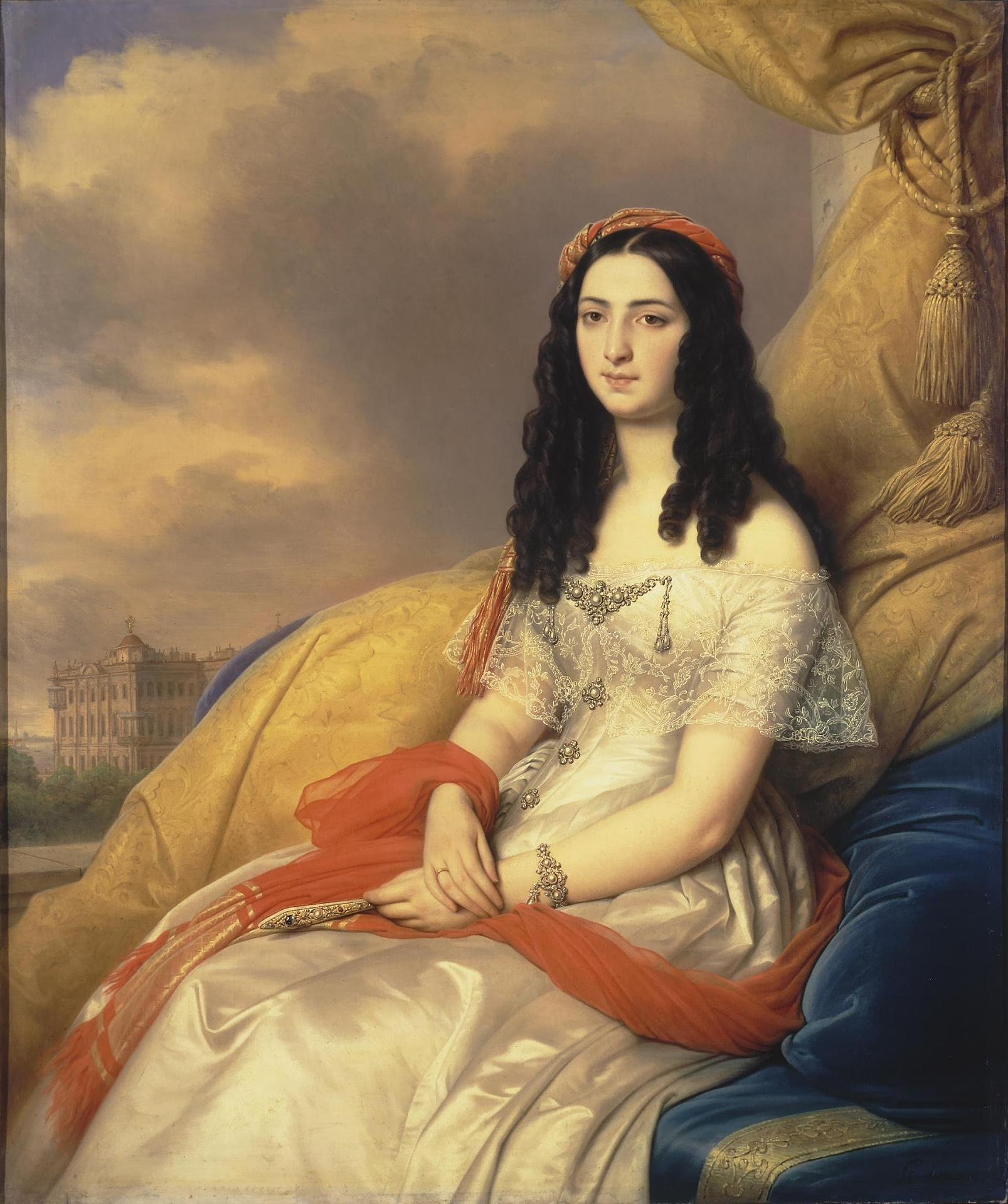
Mme la comtesse Dash

Gabrielle Anne Cisterne de Courtiras, vicomtesse de Saint-Mars (2 August 1804 – 11 September 1872), pen name Countess Dash, was a prolific French writer.

== Biography ==
Gabrielle de Courtiras was a daughter of M. de Courtiras, and early married the Marquis de Saint-Mars. After the loss of her fortune, she took to writing. On her remarking that she wished to write under a pseudonym, that of her favorite dog, “Dash,” was suggested, which she adopted.

She had a love affair with the Romanian boyar and heir apparent to the Moldavian throne Grigore Mihail Sturdza who was 18 years her junior. They met in Paris in 1843 while Grigore was a university student. In 1844 he returned to Moldavia and in early 1845 Countess Dash joined him. Grigore informed his father, prince Mihail Sturdza that they were to be married; Mihail advised him to wait.

As reported by writer Constantin Negruzzi, who was a personal witness to the events, he held the Perieni priest at gunpoint, forcing him to perform a ceremony in his father's absence, and without his approval. Dash had been formally baptized into Eastern Orthodoxy (the Moldavian Metropolitan Church), taking the name of "Diana". Her baptism and wedding were reported to the Moldavian Metropolis, which proceeded to nullify the latter act, effective on May 9, and informed the Price of his son's doings. The national scandal which erupted turned international, once it became apparent that Countess Dash was a bigamist under French law. The French consul, François Duclos, stepped in to persuade the couple that the marriage was not legal, but found himself confronted by Grigore Strudza, and unable to answer the Countess' observation that she was no longer a French national, nor a Catholic. In June 1845, French Prime Minister François Guizot personally weighed in, informing Gabrielle of the risks she was taking upon herself.

A notice originally published in Kölnische Zeitung that December noted that Sturdza and Dash had "dissolved their marriage by mutual agreement", and that he was set to marry one of Ivan Paskevich's daughters. In 1846, Dash and her cousin were living in Como, Italy at Grigore Sturdza's expense.

She wrote five to six novels. Her themes are mainly from the beau monde era in France and deal with themes of romantic love.

== Works ==
- Le jeu de la reine, her first work (1839)
- Les amours de Bussy-Rabutin (1850)
- La pomme d'Eve (1853)
- Le neuf de pique (1854)
- La belle aux yeux d'or (1860)
- Les galanteries de la cour de Louis XV (1861)
- La sorcière du roi (1861)
- Le nain du diable (1862)
- Les derniers amours de Mme. Dubarry (1864)
- La bague empoisonnée (1866)
- Comment tombent les femmes (1867)
- Les aventures d'une jeune mariée (1870)

A collection of her works was published in 1864, in 34 volumes.

== Sources ==
- Gilman, D. C.; Peck, H. T.; Colby, F. M., eds. (1905). "Dash, La Comtesse" . New International Encyclopedia (1st ed.). New York: Dodd, Mead.
- "Saint-Mars, Gabrielle Anne Cisterne de Courtiras, vicomtesse de, 1804-1872". The Online Books Page.
