= Pârâul Cetății =

Pârâul Cetății may refer to:

- Pârâul Cetății, a tributary of the Baraolt in Covasna County, Romania
- Pârâul Cetății, a tributary of the Belcina in Harghita County, Romania
- Pârâul Cetății (Olt), a tributary of the Olt River in Harghita County, Romania
- Pârâul Cetății, a tributary of the Telejenel in Prahova County, Romania

== See also ==
- Cetate (disambiguation)
- Cetățuia River (disambiguation)
