= Cetățuia =

Cetățuia may refer to several villages in Romania:

- Cetățuia, a village in Strugari Commune, Bacău County
- Cetățuia, a village in Bărbulețu Commune, Dâmbovița County
- Cetățuia, a village in Cioroiași Commune, Dolj County
- Cetățuia, a village in Vela Commune, Dolj County
- Cetățuia, a village in Găujani Commune, Giurgiu County
- Cetățuia, a village in Sânsimion Commune, Harghita County
- Cetățuia, a village in Puiești Commune, Vaslui County

and to:

- Cetățuia, a fortified hill in Cluj-Napoca
- Cetățuia, one of the Seven hills of Iași
  - Cetățuia Monastery

== See also ==
- Cetate (disambiguation)
- Cetatea (disambiguation)
- Cetățuia River (disambiguation)
