= Cetățuia River =

Cetățuia River may refer to:

- Cetățuia, a tributary of the Crasna in Vaslui County
- Luncavița River (Danube), also known as Cetățuia

== See also ==
- Cetățuia (disambiguation)
- Pârâul Cetății (disambiguation)
