= Cetatea =

Cetatea may refer to several villages in Romania:

- Cetatea, a village in Dobromir Commune, Constanța County
- Cetatea, a village in Frătești Commune, Giurgiu County
- Cetatea, a village in Căpreni Commune, Gorj County
- Cetatea, a village in Rădoiești Commune, Teleorman County

and to:

- Cetatea Albă, the Romanian name for Bilhorod-Dnistrovskyi, Odesa Oblast, Ukraine

== See also ==
- Cetate (disambiguation)
- Cetățuia (disambiguation)
