= Battle of Cetate =

1853–54 battle of the Crimean War

Coordinates: 44°06′N 23°13′E

- Part of the Crimean War
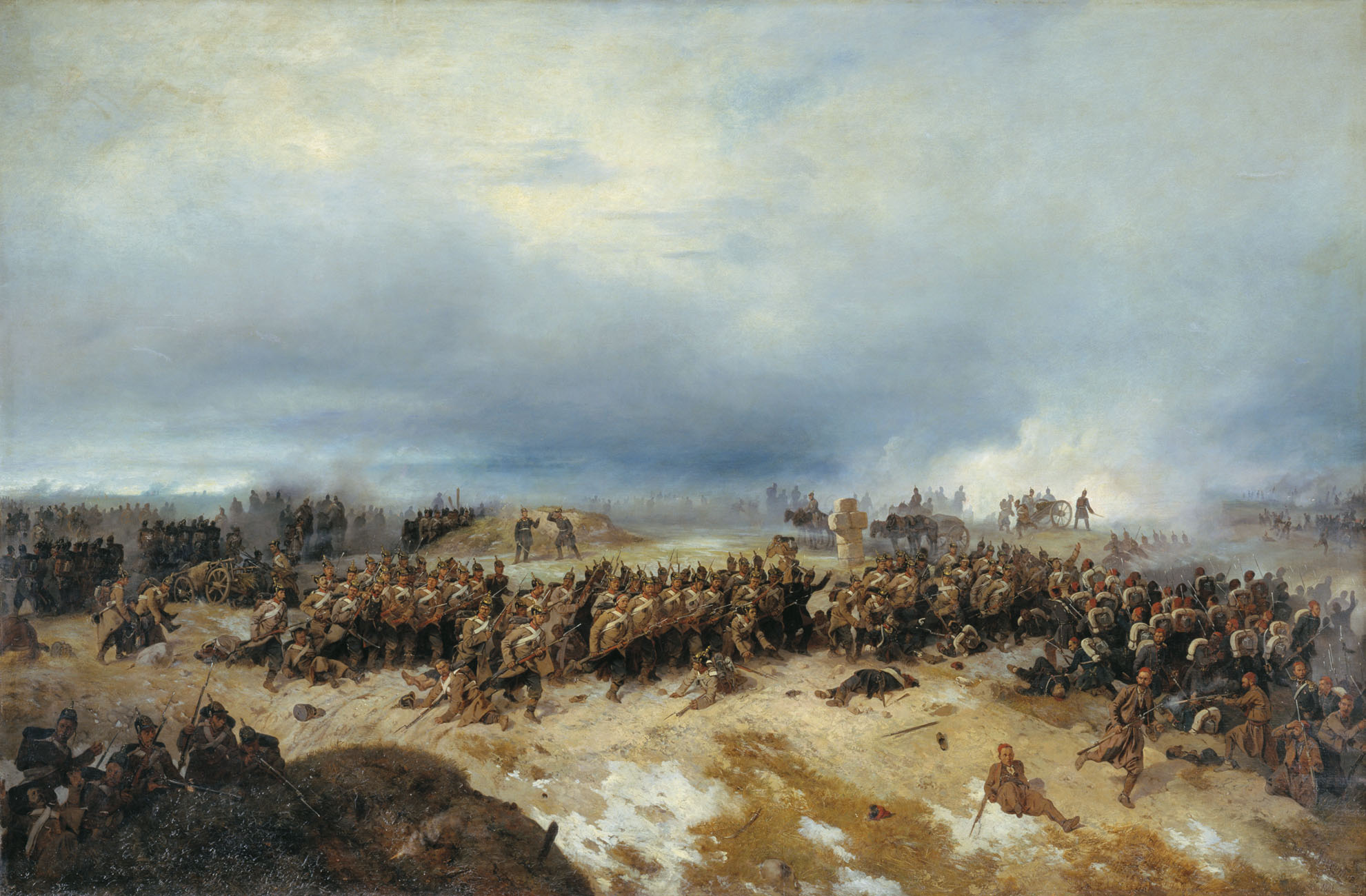
- The Battle of Cetate
Date	31 December 1853 – 6 January 1854
Location	Cetate, Wallachia
Result	Inconclusive (Note: The first battle began with the Ottoman offensive, all attacks were repulsed with heavy losses for both sides, the battle ended with the success of the Russians. Bellegarde's troops arrived and knocked the Ottomans out of their trenches, but failed in their attempts to dislodge the Ottomans from the staging area; therefore, the second engagement, against Bellegarde, was a draw. As news of Anrep's arrival on the battlefield came to the Ottomans in the evening, they retreated, and were shattered in the course of their withdrawal (n.b.: Anrep was not involved in the battle).)

Belligerents
Ottoman Empire	Russian Empire

Commanders and leaders
(Ottoman Empire) Ahmed Pasha (Ottoman Empire) Omar Pasha	(Russian Empire) Col. Alexander Karlovich Baumgarten (WIA) (Russian Empire) Maj. Gen. Karl Aleksandrovich Bellegarde (Russian Empire) Iosif Anrep-Elmpt (unengaged)

Strength
18,000 (totally), 24 guns	First Engagement: 2,500, 6 guns (Baumgarten) (full force) Second Engagement: 5,000–7,000 (Baumgarten & Bellegarde)

Casualties and losses
3,000, 6 guns, 3 banners	835 killed and 1,213 wounded

The Battle of Cetate was fought during the Crimean War. In this battle a large Ottoman force under Ahmed Pasha unsuccessfully attempted to capture the village of Cetate which was controlled by Russian Colonel Alexander Baumgarten.

== Background ==
The battle took place during the Danube campaign of the Crimean War. In the build-up to the war, Russia occupied the Danubian Principalities of Moldavia and Wallachia, positioning troops on the left (northern) bank of the Danube, which formed the border with Ottoman territory. The Ottoman Empire had responded by moving troops to the right bank to face them.

In the west, on the border with Austria and Serbia, Russian troops in Cetate were faced by Ottoman forces in the fortress of Vidin.

Following the Ottoman ultimatum on 4 October 1853 to withdraw within 2 weeks, Ottoman forces under Ahmed Pasha crossed the river and occupied the town of Calafat, which they fortified as a bridgehead.

== Battle ==
On 31 December 1853 Ahmed Pasha and a force of several thousand cavalry, supported by infantry, advanced to attack Cetate, which was held by a Russian detachment, under Colonel Alexander K. Baumgarten. This attack was repulsed, after which both sides called up reinforcements.

On 6 January 1854 (Christmas Day in the Russian Orthodox calendar), Ahmed renewed his assault with a force of 18,000 men. The Russians repelled several attacks but were running out of shells and losing a significant number of the troops. However, Russian reinforcements arrived during the day (under Major General Karl Aleksandrovich Bellegarde) and pushed the Turks out of their trenches, but failed in their attempts to dislodge the Turks from the staging area.

An important role in the battle had Grigore M. Sturdza, who enlisted in the Ottoman Army under the name of Muhlis Pasha. According to historian Adrian-Silvan Ionescu, he was riding ahead of his troops, exposing himself to Russian fire and shooting at Russian officers with a long-range English rifle. Citing an article from The Illustrated London News titled A brave boyard (No. 669, 18 February 1854, p. 155), Ionescu shows that Sturdza personally shot at Russian officers from horseback, that he reportedly struck General Anrep's helmet and that he continued firing until Russian artillery killed his horse beneath him.

== Aftermath ==
In the evening, having received the news that General Anrep with large forces moves to the battlefield, Ahmed, fearing an assault on his base and being cut off himself, abandoned the town and retreated to Calafat, the Russians for some time persecuted, having killed many.

== Gallery ==
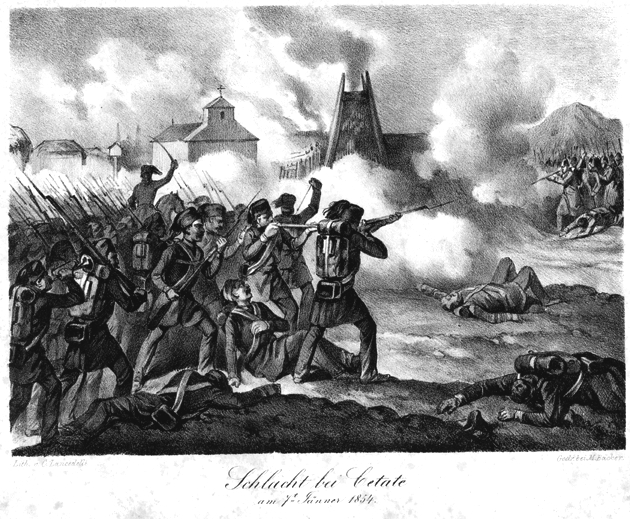
Battle of Cetate by Karl Lanzedelli

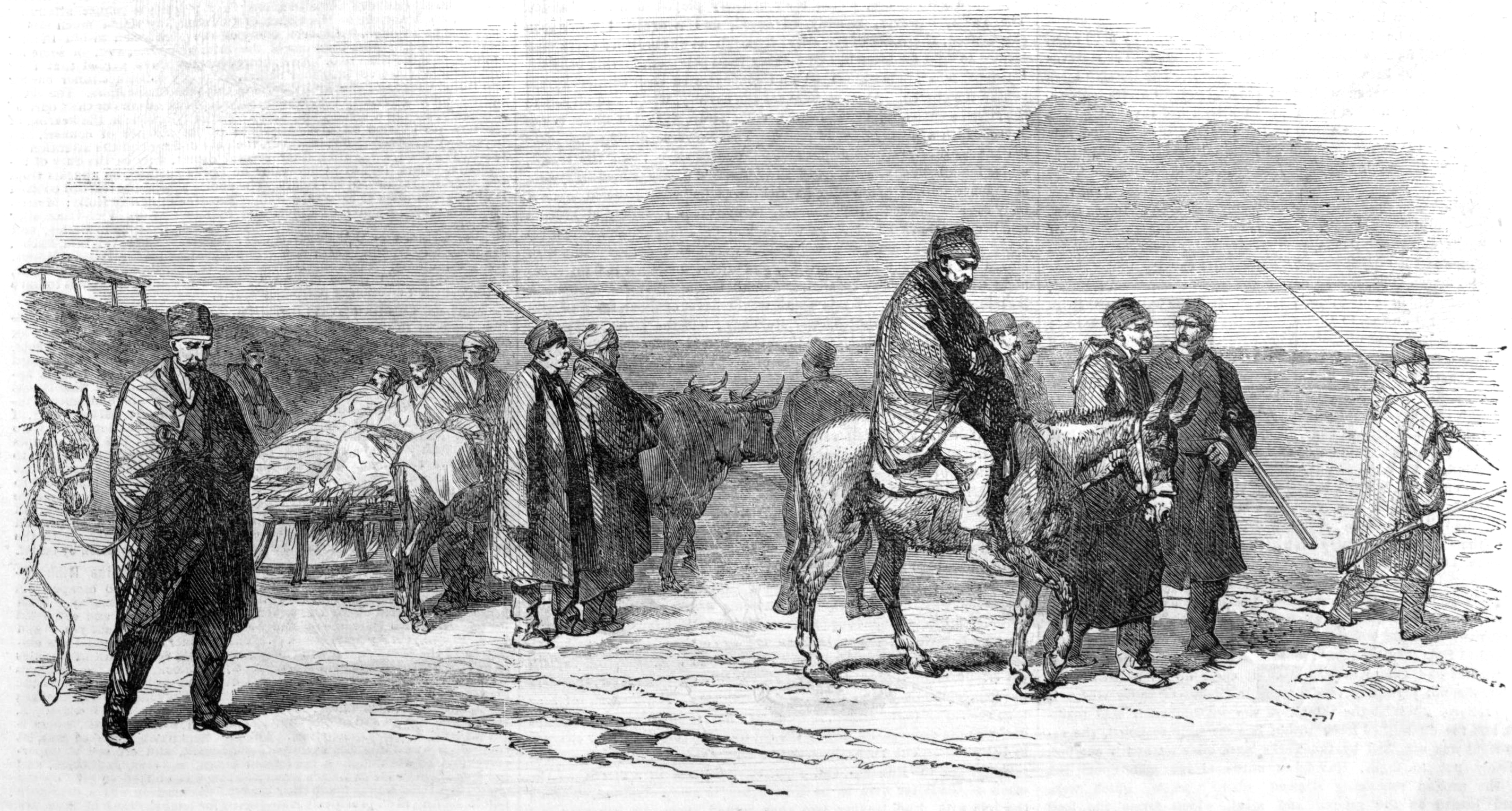
Arrival at Calafat of the wounded from Cetate

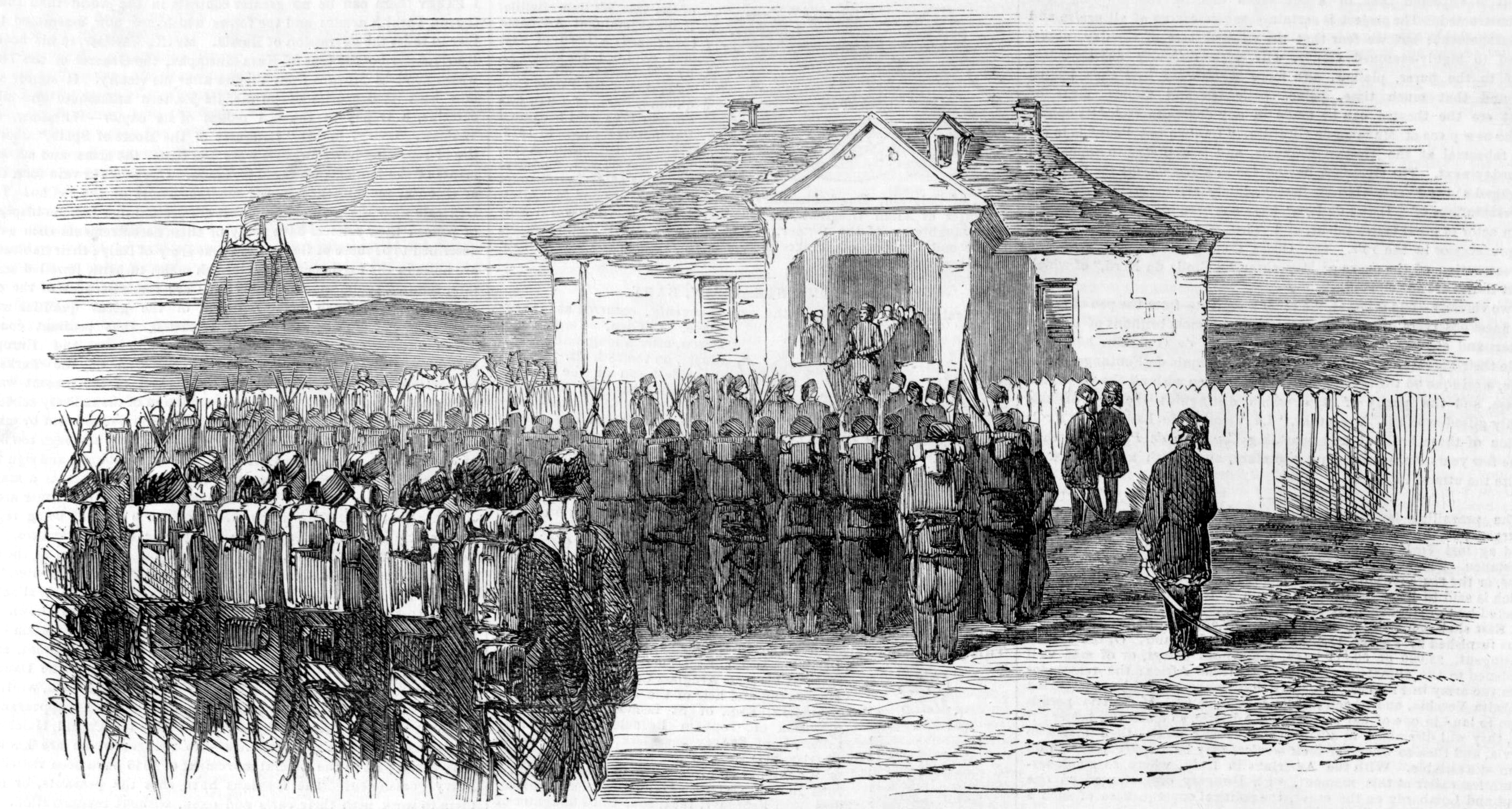
Distribution of the Medjidie, after the Battle of Cetate

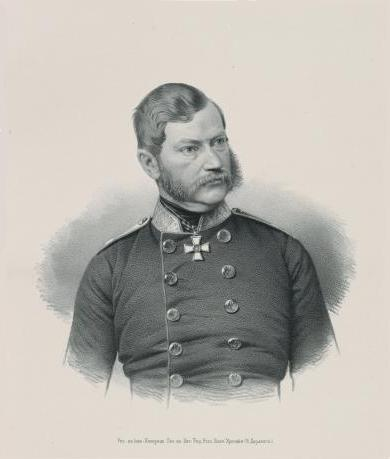
Colonel Alexander Karlovich Baumgarten, sometimes between 1858 and 1861

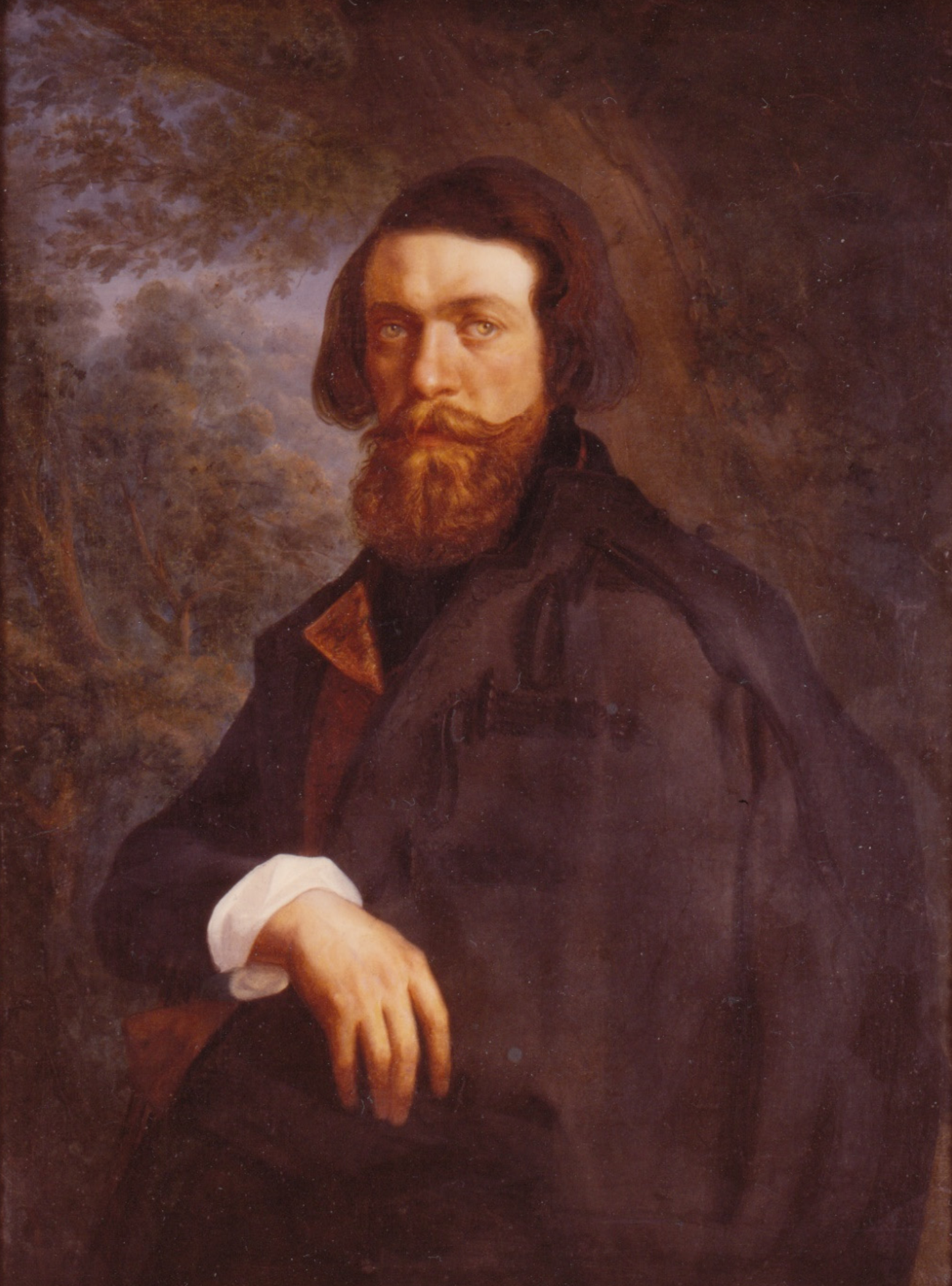
Portrait of Grigore Sturdza (Muhlis Pasha), cca. 1855

== See also ==
- Battle of Oltenița
