= Miroslav Hubmajer =

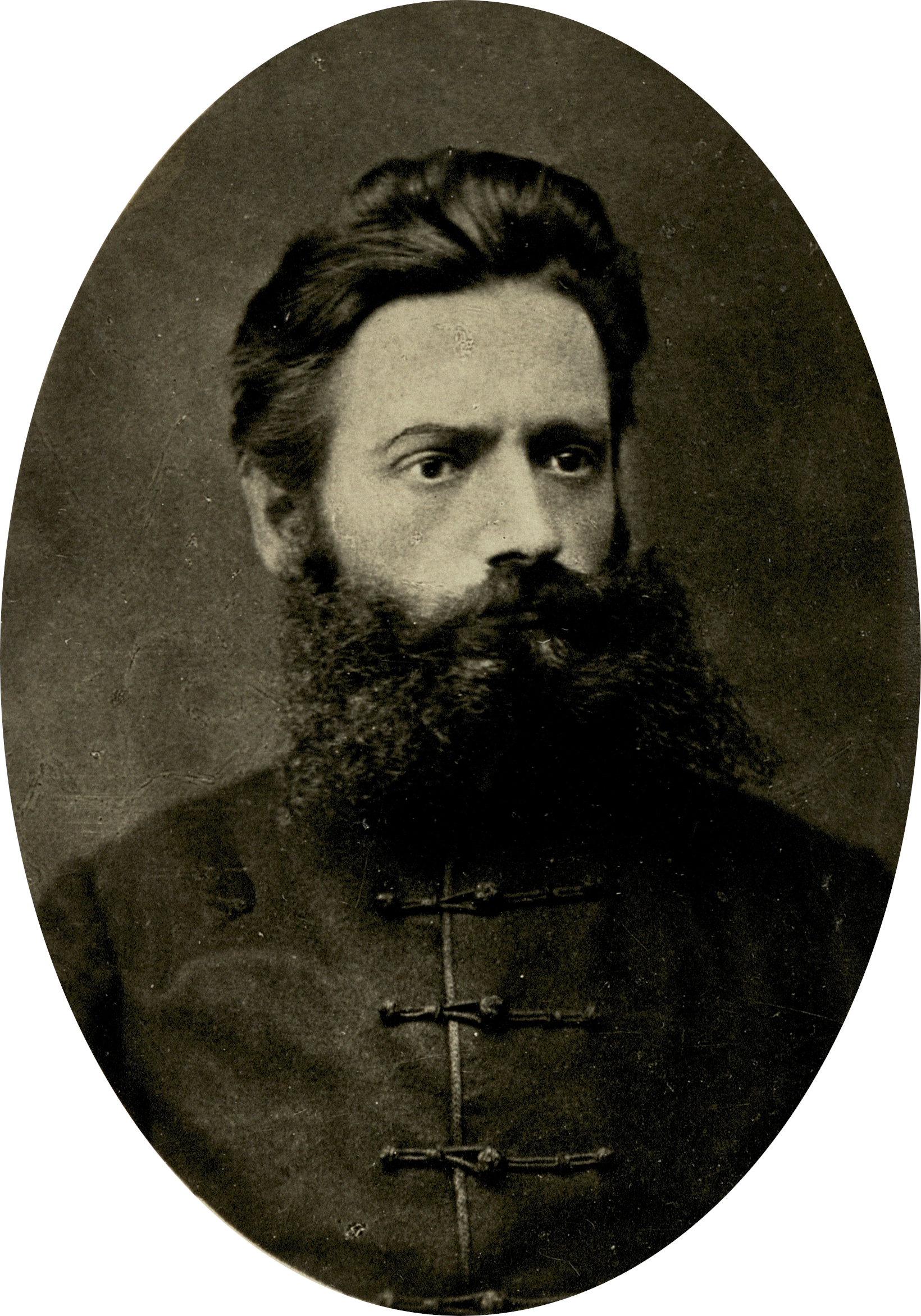
Miroslav Hubmajer, a Slovenian officer and volunteer in the Herzegovina Uprising, 1851–1910

Miroslav Hubmajer (3 January 1851–1 March 1910) was a Slovenian officer who volunteered in the Herzegovina Uprising and Serbo-Turkish war. For a time, he lived in Belgrade, and then lived in Austro-Hungarian Sarajevo.

== Early life ==
Miroslav Hubmajer was born in Ljubljana at Floriansgasse 97 (now Gornji trg) and baptized Friedrich Hubmayer. Trained as a mailman, he worked in Egypt and Sudan. During military service in the Austrian army, he received the rank of reserve lower officer. He served as an artillery NCO in Segedin, where he became acquainted with Serbs. His interest in studying mechanics led him to apply for several patents. After military service he started working for the National Printing House (Narodna tiskarna) in Ljubljana. The workers at that time were well-organized, informed, and educated and Hubmajer joined their organization.

== Wars ==
With the Herzegovina uprising (1875–1877), many printworkers joined as volunteers, including Hubmajer, who went to Herzegovina in May 1876. Hubmajer, called "Black Miroslav" by the rebels, was best known among all Slovenian volunteers in the uprising. Stories about his military achievements circulated in the magazines in Bosnia and Herzegovina.

At the Rebel Assembly in Jamnica he was elected against Peter Mrkonjić (later Serbian King Petar I Karadjordjević) for chief commander of all rebel troops although he was not recognized as leader of adherents of Peter Mrkonjić. The Turks launched a high reward for his head.

Hubmajer's first military activities were around Trebinje. He was part of the rebel delegation along with Kosta Grujić to the Principality of Montenegro to gain support from Prince Nikola in the uprising. The vojvoda Vrbić, Minister of the Interior, kindly accepted them and presented them to all the nobility and guests on the Montenegrin court. In recognition of his merits in the struggle against the Turks he received a gun belt with 60 bullets from Vrbić. Later he was sent to Una region in Bosnia to start, organize and command the uprising in that region. Meanwhile, it was recognized that individual forces could not achieve strategic success, thus 85 rebel leaders gathered in Jamnica, west of Una, to elect a chief commander and determine the battle plan. Petar Mrkonjić (the nom de guerre of Petar I Karađorđević) was suggested by some to lead the command, as he was the grandson of Karađorđe and had bravely fought in the French army against the Prussians and proved his heroism in the battle on the River Loire. But volunteers at the assembly were not in accordance; the small majority of those present were supporters of Prince Milan of Serbia (in the Karađorđević–Obrenović feud), led by Peter Uzelac, who succeeded to prevent the election of Petar Mrkonjić. Instead, Hubmajer was selected. As commander he led fierce battles near Jamnica and tried to take Kostajnica. When it failed, he successfully led his army to attack the Turkish troops in Topola, two hours away from Jamnica. After this victory the rebels swore an oath to the Serbian flag that they will fight to the end.

In 1876 he joined the Serbian army and became an artillery officer active in the Serbo-Turkish war. He participated at Javor and Deligrad. Russian general Mikhail Chernyayev, who came with volunteers from Russia to help Serbia and became the chief commander of the Serbian army, raised him to the rank of lieutenant because of his abilities.

== Post-war career ==
He accompanied Nikola Pašić's exile to Bucharest, where he founded a lithographic institute. Later he got a job in Belgrade and was editor Belgrader Zeitung. Together with Vasa Pelagić in 1884 he wrote the declaration for the Balkan-Carpathian federation. In 1896 he got a job in the regional museum in Sarajevo as an expert adviser for the Austro-Hungarian ministry of finance and administrator of the Condominium of Bosnia and Herzegovina, Beni Kallay.

Hubmajer died on 1 March 1910 in Sarajevo.
