= Probota =

- Commune
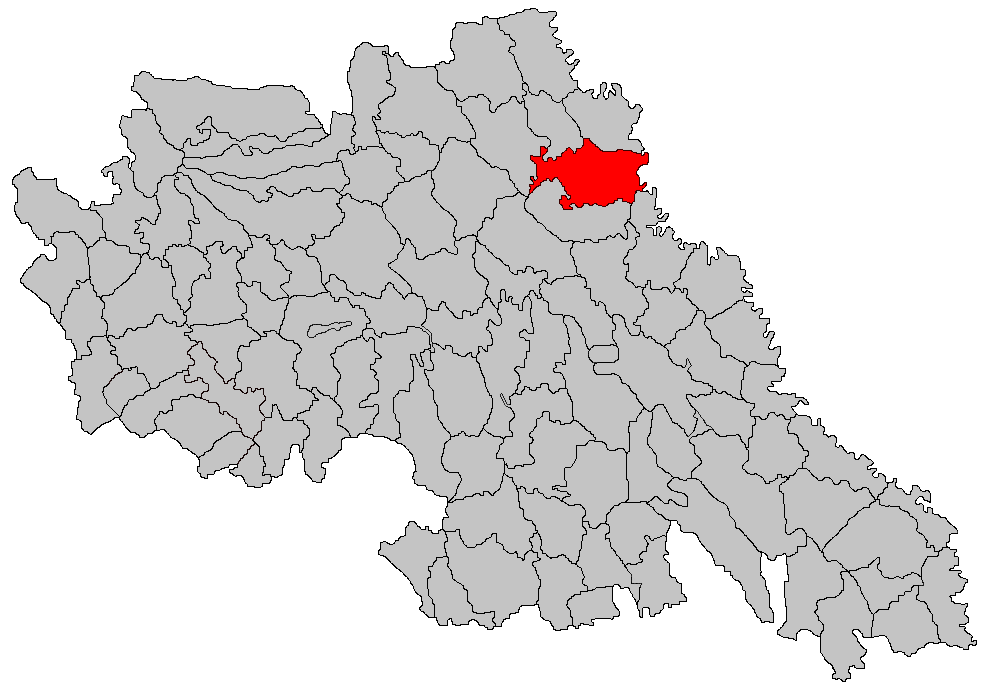
- Location in Iași County

- Location in Romania
- Coordinates: 47°24′N 27°30′E
- Country: Romania
- County: Iași
- Subdivisions: Probota, Bălteni, Perieni

Government
  - Mayor (2024–2028): Constantin Zamisnicu (PNL)
- Area: 76.66 km^{2} (29.60 sq mi)
- Elevation: 65 m (213 ft)
- Population (2021-12-01): 3,277
  - Density: 43/km^{2} (110/sq mi)
- Time zone: EET/EEST (UTC+2/+3)
- Postal code: 707395
- Area code: +40 x32
- Vehicle reg.: IS
- Website: primariaprobota.ro

Probota is a commune in Iași County, Western Moldavia, Romania. It is composed of three villages: Bălteni, Perieni and Probota.
