= Cetate, Dolj =

Cetate
- Commune
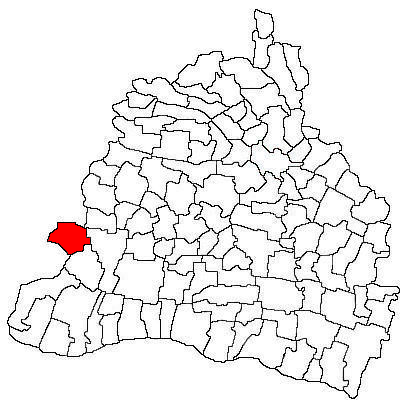
- Location in Dolj County

- Location in Romania
- Coordinates: 44°6′N 23°03′E
- Country: Romania
- County: Dolj

Government
  - Mayor (2020–2024): Marin Duță (PSD)
- Area: 86.8 km^{2} (33.5 sq mi)
- Elevation: 81 m (266 ft)
- Population (2021-12-01): 4,572
  - Density: 53/km^{2} (140/sq mi)
- Time zone: EET/EEST (UTC+2/+3)
- Postal code: 207190
- Area code: +(40) 251
- Vehicle reg.: DJ
- Website: www.primariacetate.ro

Cetate is a commune in Dolj County, Oltenia, Romania. It is composed of two villages, Cetate and Moreni. As of 2021, its population was 4,572, of which 4,118 lived in Cetate proper and 454 in Moreni.

In January 1854, during the Crimean War, Cetate was the scene of a battle between a Russian garrison there and a Turkish army based in Calafat. The battle was inconclusive, though the Turks were unable to capture the town.

== Natives ==
- Constantin Agiu (1891 – 1961), Communist politician
- Gheorghe Vasilichi (1902 – 1974), Communist politician and statesman
