= Crimean War =

Tenth conflict of the Russo-Turkish wars (1853–1856)

- Part of the Ottoman wars in Europe and the Russo-Turkish wars
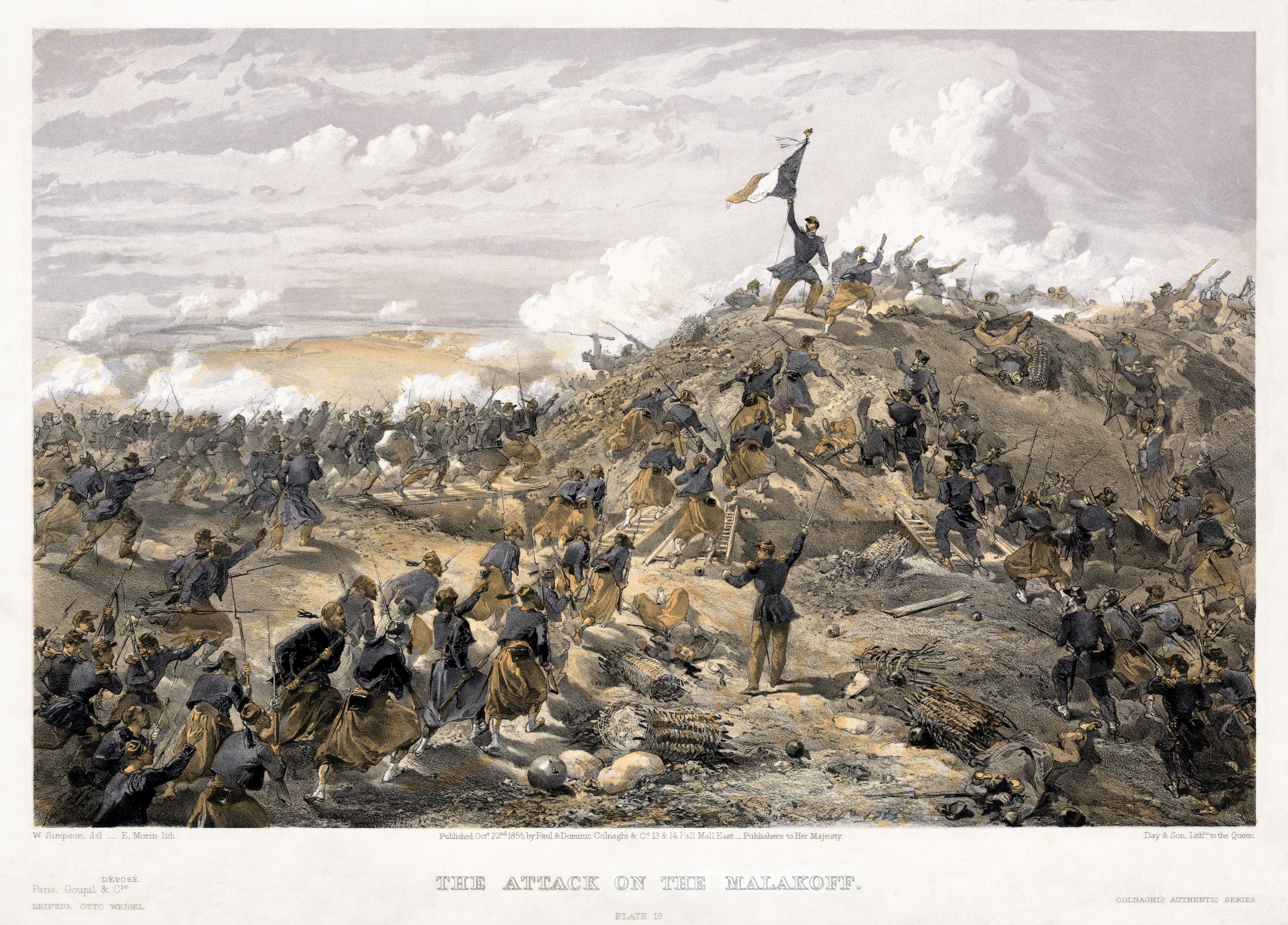
- Attack on the Malakoff, by William Simpson
Date	16 October 1853 – 30 March 1856 (2 years, 5 months and 2 weeks)
Location	Crimea, North Caucasus, Balkans, Black Sea, Baltic Sea, White Sea, Far East
Result	Allied victory
Territorial changes	Russia loses the Danube Delta and Southern Bessarabia

Belligerents
Ottoman Empire (Second French Empire) French Empire (Note: From 1854) (United Kingdom of Great Britain and Ireland) United Kingdom (Kingdom of Sardinia) Sardinia (Note: From 1855)	Russian Empire Kingdom of Greece (Note: Until 1854)

Commanders and leaders
Abdulmejid I; Omar Pasha; Napoléon III; J. L. de Saint-Arnaud #; George Hamilton-Gordon; Lord Palmerston; FitzRoy Somerset #; (Kingdom of Sardinia) Alfonso La Marmora	Nicholas I #; Alexander II; Prince Menshikov; Prince Gorchakov; Prince Paskevich; Prince Vorontsov; Nikolay Muravyov; Pavel Nakhimov †

Strength
Total: 673,900 (Ottoman Empire) 235,568 (Second French Empire) 309,268 (United Kingdom of Great Britain and Ireland) 97,864 (Kingdom of Sardinia) 21,000	Total: 889,000–1,774,872; 888,000 mobilised 324,478 deployed

Casualties and losses
Total: 165,363 dead 45,770 combat deaths 119,593 non-combat deaths: (Ottoman Empire) 45,400 dead 20,900 combat deaths 24,500 non-combat deaths; 95,615 dead 20,240 combat deaths 75,375 non-combat deaths; (United Kingdom of Great Britain and Ireland) 22,182 dead 4,602 combat deaths 17,580 non-combat deaths; (Kingdom of Sardinia) 2,166 dead 28 combat deaths 2,138 non-combat deaths (Clodfelter)	Total: 450,015 dead 73,125 combat deaths 376,890 non-combat deaths Total: 630,000 dead Total: 522,000 dead 35,671 combat deaths 37,454 non-combat deaths (Sep. 1854 – Oct. 1855 alone)
- Nearly 200,000 Crimean Tatars displaced
- Casualties include death by disease. In all cases, death by disease exceeded the sum of "killed in action" or "died of wounds".

The Crimean War (Note: French: Guerre de Crimée; Russian: Крымская война, romanized: Krymskaya voyna or Восточная война, Vostochnaya voyna, lit. 'Eastern War'; Turkish: Kırım Savaşı; Italian: Guerra di Crimea; Crimean Tatar: Qırım cenki) was fought between Russia and an alliance of the Ottoman Empire, France, the United Kingdom, and Sardinia from October 1853 to February 1856. Geopolitical causes of the war included the Eastern question (the decline of the Ottoman Empire), the expansion of Russia in the preceding Russo-Turkish wars, and the British and French preference to preserve the Ottoman Empire to maintain the balance of power in the Concert of Europe.

The war's proximate cause was Tsar Nicholas I's demand that the Ottoman Empire's Orthodox subjects be placed under his protection. After the Sublime Porte's refusal, Russian troops occupied the Danubian Principalities in July 1853. The Ottomans declared war on Russia in October. Fearing the growth of Russian influence and compelled by public outrage over the annihilation of the Ottoman squadron at Sinop, Britain and France joined the war on the Ottoman side in March 1854. The Russian advance was halted at Silistria in June.

In September 1854, after extended preparations, allied forces landed in Crimea in an attempt to capture Russia's main naval base in the Black Sea, Sevastopol. They scored an early victory at the Battle of the Alma. The Russians counterattacked in late October in what became the Battle of Balaclava and were repulsed, and a second counterattack at Inkerman ended in a Russian defeat. The front settled into the 11-month Siege of Sevastopol, involving brutal conditions for troops on both sides. Smaller military actions took place in the Caucasus (1853–1855), the White Sea (July–August 1854) and the North Pacific (1854–1855). The Kingdom of Sardinia-Piedmont entered on the allies' side in 1855.

Sevastopol ultimately fell after a renewed French assault on the Malakoff redoubt in September 1855. Diplomatically isolated and facing the prospect of invasion from the west if the war continued, Russia sued for peace in March 1856. France and Britain welcomed the development due to the conflict's domestic unpopularity. The Treaty of Paris, signed on 30 March 1856, ended the war. It forbade Russia from basing warships in the Black Sea. The Ottoman vassal states of Wallachia and Moldavia became largely independent. Christians in the Ottoman Empire gained a degree of official equality, and the Orthodox Church regained control of the Christian churches in dispute.

The Crimean War was one of the first conflicts in which military forces used modern technologies such as explosive naval shells, railways, and telegraphs. It was also one of the first to be documented extensively in written reports and in photographs. The war quickly symbolised logistical, medical and tactical failures and mismanagement. The reaction in Britain led to a demand for the professionalisation of medicine, most famously achieved by Florence Nightingale, who gained worldwide attention for pioneering modern nursing while she treated the wounded.

The Crimean War also marked a turning point for the Russian Empire. It weakened the Imperial Russian Army, drained the treasury, and undermined its influence in Europe. The defeat forced Russia's educated elites to identify the country's fundamental problems. It became a catalyst for reforms of Russia's social institutions, including the emancipation reform of 1861, which abolished serfdom in Russia, and overhauls in the justice system, local self-government, education, and military service.

== Eastern question ==
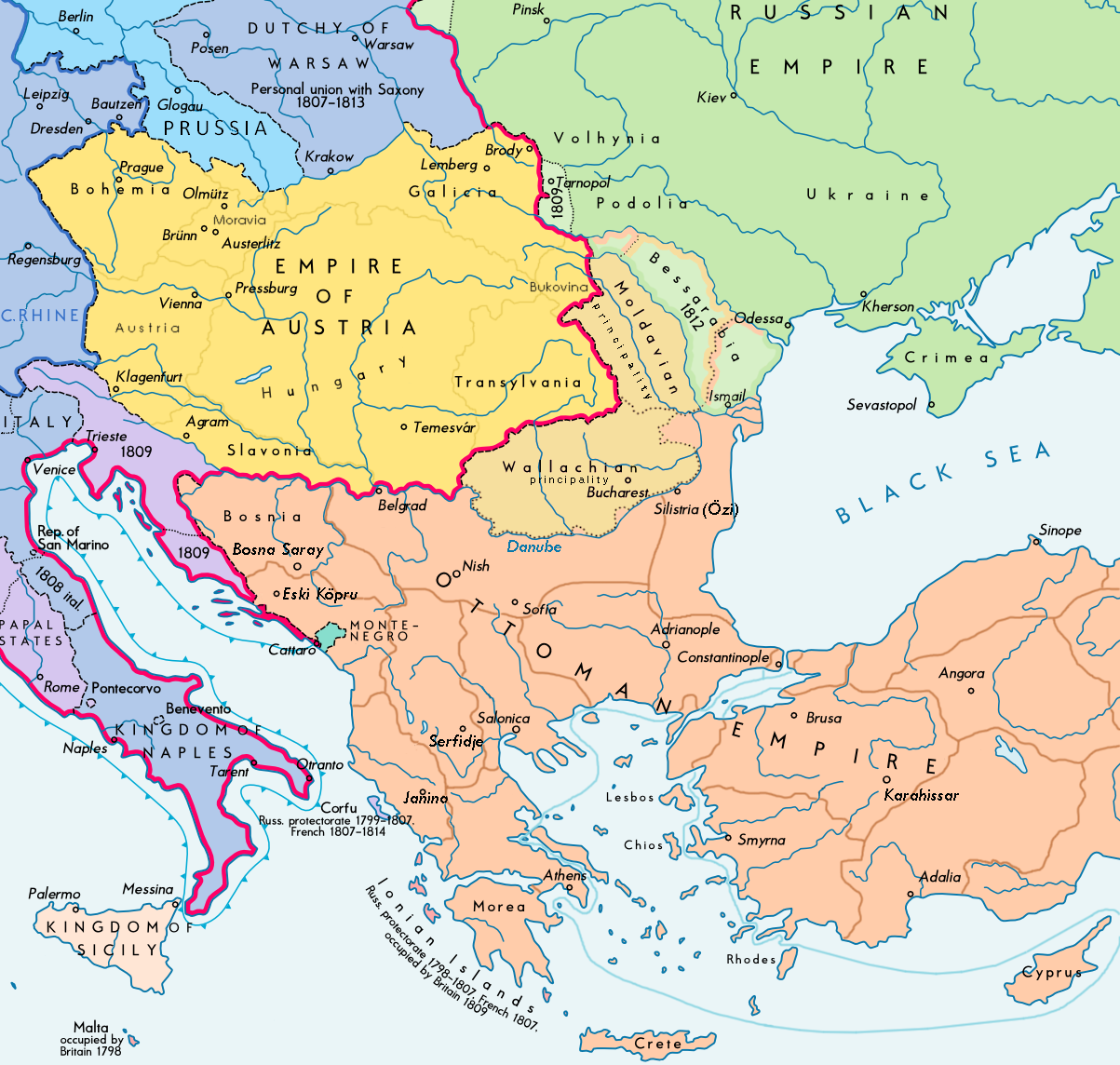
Southeastern Europe after the Treaty of Bucharest (1812)

As the Ottoman Empire steadily weakened during the 19th century, the Russian Empire stood poised to take advantage by expanding southward. In the 1850s, the British and the French Empires were allied with the Ottoman Empire and were determined to prevent that from happening. The historian A. J. P. Taylor argued that the war had resulted not from aggression, but from the interacting fears of the major players:

In some sense the Crimean War was predestined and had deep-seated causes. Neither Nicholas I nor Napoleon III nor the British government could retreat from the conflict for prestige once it was launched. Nicholas needed a subservient Turkey for the sake of Russian security; Napoleon needed success for the sake of his domestic position; the British government needed an independent Turkey for the security of the Eastern Mediterranean... Mutual fear, not mutual aggression, caused the Crimean War.

== Background ==
=== Weakening of the Ottoman Empire: 1820–1840s ===
In the early 1800s, the Ottoman Empire suffered a number of existential challenges. The Serbian Revolution in 1804 resulted in the autonomy of the first Balkan Christian nation under the empire. The Greek War of Independence, which began in early 1821, provided further evidence of the empire's internal and military weakness, and the commission of atrocities by Ottoman military forces (see Chios massacre) further undermined the empire. The disbandment of the centuries-old Janissary corps by Sultan Mahmud II on 15 June 1826 (Auspicious Incident) helped the empire in the longer term but deprived it of its existing standing army in the short term.

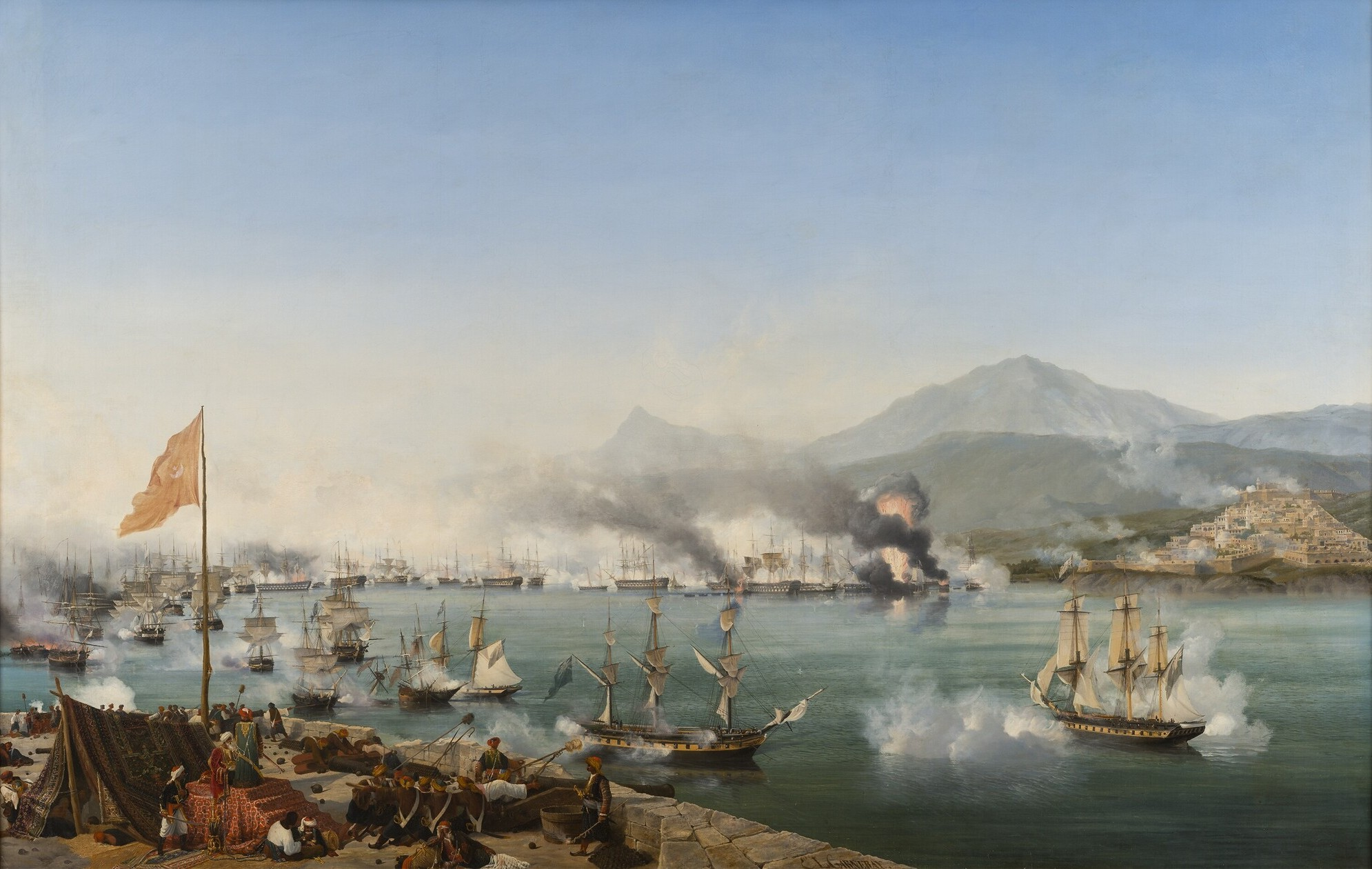
The naval Battle of Navarino (1827), as depicted by Ambroise Louis Garneray.

In 1827, the Anglo-Franco-Russian fleet destroyed almost all of the Ottoman naval forces at the Battle of Navarino. In 1830, Greece became independent after ten years of war and the Russo-Turkish War (1828–29). The Treaty of Adrianople (1829) granted Russian and Western European commercial ships free passage through the Black Sea straits. Also, the Danubian Principalities (Moldavia and Wallachia) became territories under Russian protection.

France took the opportunity to occupy Algeria, which had been under Ottoman rule, in 1830. In 1831, Muhammad Ali of Egypt, the most powerful vassal of the Ottoman Empire, declared independence. Ottoman forces were defeated in a number of battles, which forced Mahmud II to seek Russian military aid. A Russian army of 10,000 landed on the shores of the Bosphorus in 1833 and helped prevent the Egyptians from capturing Constantinople.

"The reasons for the Tsar's disquietude are not obscure. It was not just Turkey that was threatened by the advance of Ibrahim. The rights secured to Russia by a succession of treaties were also directly jeopardized. The substitution of a virile Albanian dynasty at Constantinople in place of the effete Osmanlis was the last thing desired by the Power which wished, naturally enough, to command the gate into the Mediterranean". Russia was satisfied with the weak government in Constantinople (Istanbul).

As a result, the Treaty of Hünkâr İskelesi was signed and greatly benefited Russia. It provided for a military alliance between the Russian and the Ottoman Empires if one of them was attacked, and a secret additional clause allowed the Ottomans to opt out of sending troops but to close the Straits to foreign warships if Russia were under threat. Egypt remained nominally under Ottoman sovereignty but was de facto independent.

In 1838, in a situation similar to that of 1831, Muhammad Ali of Egypt was not happy about his lack of control and power in Syria, and he resumed military action. The Ottomans lost to the Egyptians at the Battle of Nezib on 24 June 1839 but were saved by Britain, Austria, Prussia and Russia, who signed a convention in London on 15 July 1840 that granted Muhammad Ali and his descendants the right to inherit power in Egypt in exchange for the removal of Egyptian forces from Syria and Lebanon. Moreover, Muhammad Ali had to admit a formal dependence on the Ottoman sultan. After Muhammad Ali refused to obey the requirements of the convention, the allied Anglo-Austrian fleet blockaded the Nile Delta, bombarded Beirut and captured Acre. Muhammad Ali then accepted the convention's conditions.

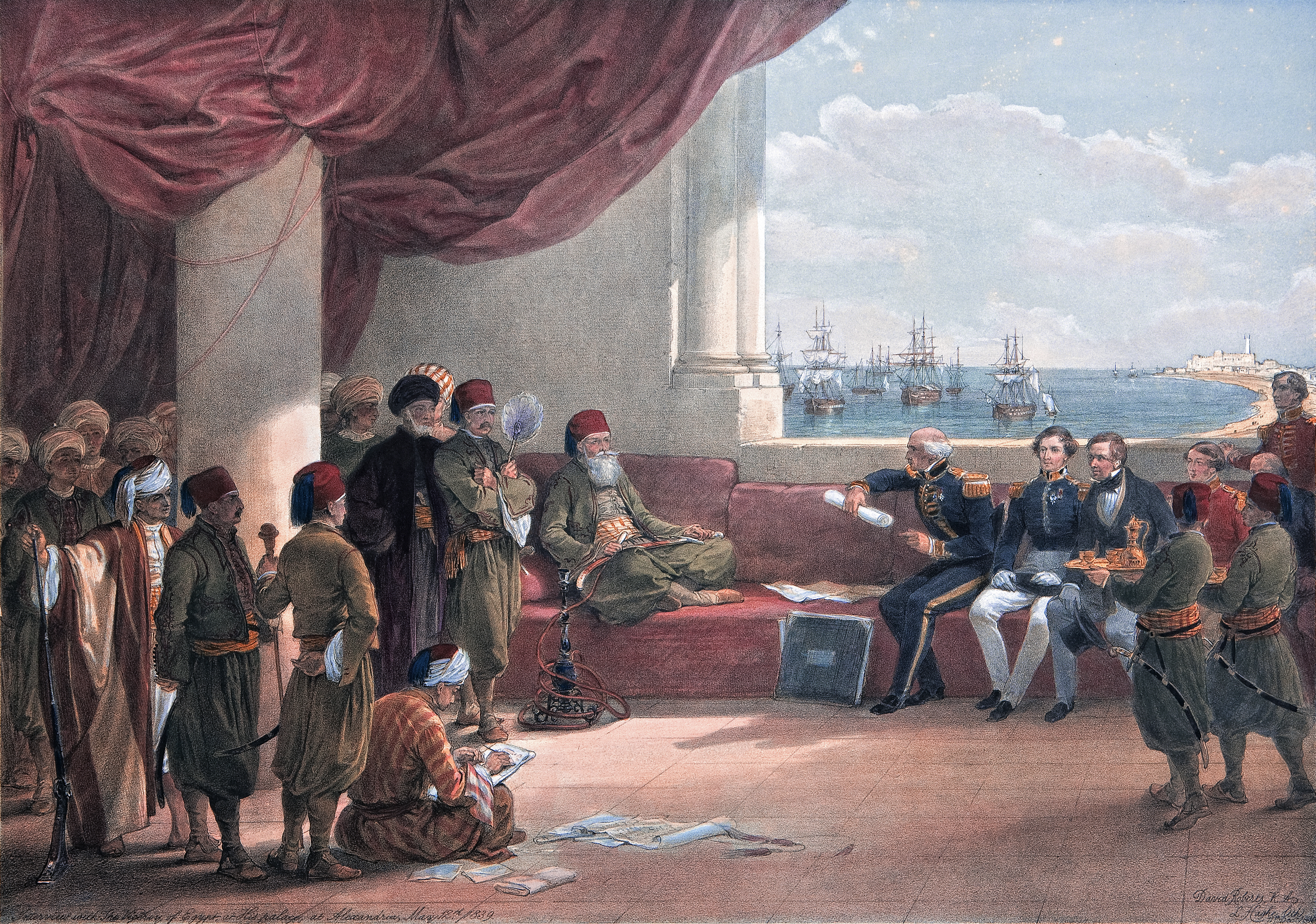
Muhammad Ali of Egypt deposed the Ottoman governor and seized control of Egypt for himself

On 13 July 1841, after the expiry of the Treaty of Hünkâr İskelesi, the London Straits Convention was signed under pressure from the European countries. The new treaty deprived Russia of its right to block warships from passing into the Black Sea in case of war. Thus, the way to the Black Sea was open for British and French warships during a possible Russo-Ottoman conflict.

Russian historians tend to view that history as evidence that Russia lacked aggressive plans. The Russian historian V. N. Vinogradov writes: "The signing of the documents was the result of deliberate decisions: instead of bilateral (none of the great powers recognized this Treaty of Unkiar Skelessi), the new Treaty of London was obligatory for all, it closed the Bosphorus and Dardanelles. In the absence of expansion plans, this was a sound decision".

In 1838, Britain lost interest in crushing the Ottoman Empire. On the contrary, after the conclusion of the trade treaty of 1838 (see Treaty of Balta Liman), Britain received unlimited access to the markets of the Ottoman Empire. "Britain imposed on the Porte a Tariff Convention which in effect transformed the Ottoman Empire into a virtual free-trade zone. Therefore its trade interests pushed it to protect the integrity of the Ottoman Empire. In the long term, the Ottoman Empire lost the opportunity to modernize and industrialise, but in the short term, it gained the opportunity to receive the support of European powers (primarily Britain) in opposing the desire of the conquered peoples for self-determination and Russia, which sought to crush its influence in the Balkans and Asia.

Publicly, European politicians made broad promises to the Ottomans. Lord Palmerston, the British Foreign Secretary, said in 1839: "All that we hear about the decay of the Turkish Empire, and its being a dead body or a sapless trunk, and so forth, is pure and unadulterated nonsense. Given 10 years of peace under European protection, coupled with internal reform, there seemed to him no reason why it should not become again a respectable Power".

Orlando Figes has claimed that "The motives of the British in promoting liberal reforms were not just to secure the independence of the Ottoman Empire against Russia. They were also to promote the influence of Britain in Turkey", also: "to promote British free-trade interests (which may have sounded splendid but was arguably damaging to the Ottoman Empire)".

"British exports to the Ottoman Empire, including Egypt and the Danubian principalities, increased nearly threefold from 1840 to 1851 (...) Thus it was very important, from the financial point of view, for Britain to prevent the Ottoman Empire from falling into other hands."

"From this moment (1838) the export of British manufactured goods to Turkey rose steeply. There was an elevenfold increase by 1850".

Assistance from Western European powers or Russia had twice saved the Ottoman Empire from destruction, but the Ottomans also lost their independence in foreign policy. Britain and France desired more than any other states to preserve the integrity of the Ottoman Empire because they did not want to see Russia gaining access to the Mediterranean Sea. Austria had the same fears.

=== Russian expansionism ===
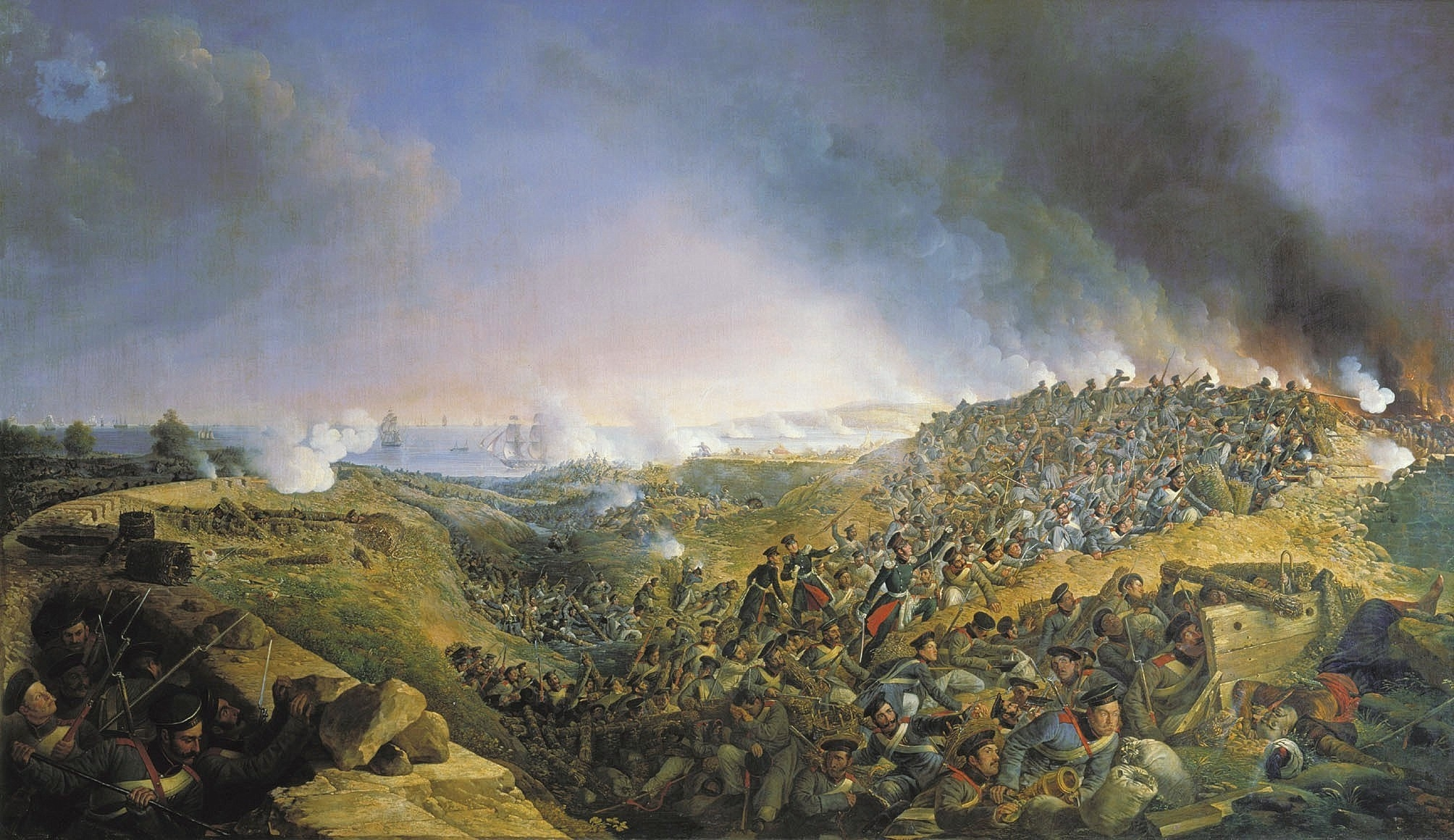
The Russian siege of Varna in Ottoman-ruled Bulgaria, July–September 1828

Russia, as a member of the Holy Alliance, had operated as the "police of Europe" to maintain the balance of power that had been established in the Congress of Vienna in 1815. Russia had assisted Austria's efforts in suppressing the Hungarian Revolution of 1848, and expected a free hand in settling its problems with the Ottoman Empire, the "sick man of Europe". However, Britain could not tolerate Russian dominance of Ottoman affairs, which would challenge its domination of the eastern Mediterranean.

Starting with Peter the Great in the early 1700s, after centuries of Ottoman northward expansion and Crimean-Nogai raids, Russia began a southwards expansion across the sparsely populated "Wild Fields" toward the warm water ports of the Black Sea, which do not freeze over, unlike the handful of ports controlled by Russia in the north. The goal was to promote year-round trade and a year-round navy. Pursuit of that goal brought the emerging Russian state into conflict with the Zaporozhian Cossacks along the lower reaches of the Dnieper River and then the Tatars of the Crimean Khanate and Circassians.

"The plan to develop Russia as a southern power had begun in earnest in 1776, when Catherine placed Potemkin in charge of New Russia (Novorossiya), the sparsely populated territories newly conquered from the Ottomans on the Black Sea's northern coastline, and ordered him to colonize the area". When Russia conquered those groups and gained possession of their territories, the Ottoman Empire lost its buffer zone against Russian expansion, and both empires came into direct conflict. The conflict with the Ottoman Empire also presented a religious issue of importance, as Russia saw itself as the protector of history of the Eastern Orthodox Church under the Ottoman Orthodox Christians, who were legally treated as second-class citizens. The Ottoman Reform Edict of 1856, promulgated after the war, largely reversed much of the second-class status, most notably the tax that only non-Muslims paid.

Britain's immediate fear was Russia's expansion at the expense of the Ottoman Empire. The British desired to preserve Ottoman integrity and were concerned that Russia might make advances toward British India or move toward Scandinavia or Western Europe. A distraction (in the form of the Ottoman Empire) on the Russian southwest flank would mitigate that threat. The Royal Navy also wanted to forestall the threat of a powerful Imperial Russian Navy. Taylor stated the British perspective:

The Crimean war was fought for the sake of Europe rather than for the Eastern question; it was fought against Russia, not in favour of Turkey.... The British fought Russia out of resentment and supposed that her defeat would strengthen the European Balance of Power.

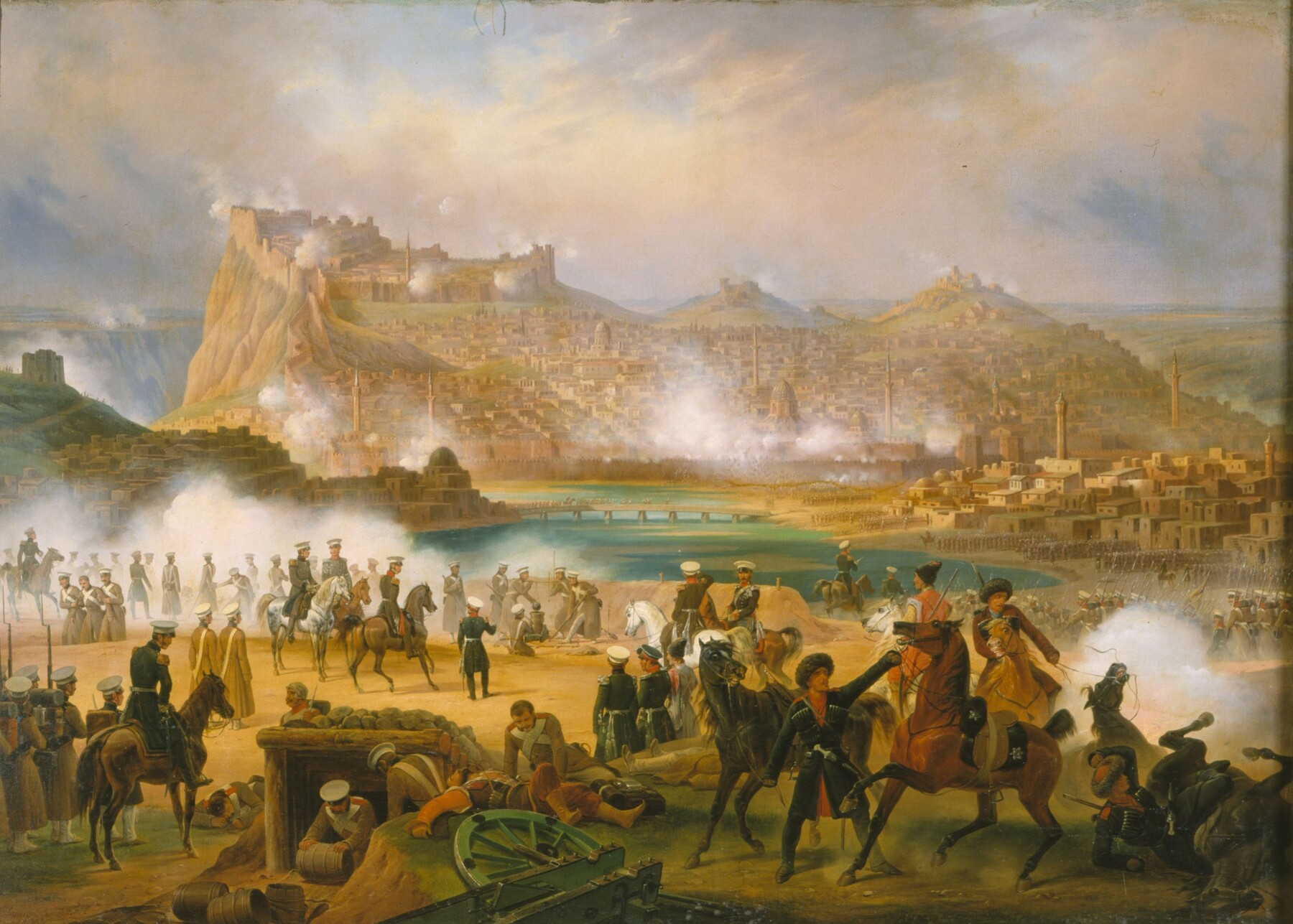
The Russian siege of Kars, Russo-Turkish War of 1828–1829

Because of "British commercial and strategic interests in the Middle East and India", the British joined the French, "cement[ing] an alliance with Britain and... reassert[ing] its military power". Among those who supported the British strategy were Karl Marx and Friedrich Engels. In his articles for the New-York Tribune around 1853, Marx saw the Crimean War as a conflict between the democratic ideals of the west that started with the "great movement of 1789" against "Russia and Absolutism". He described the Ottoman Empire as a buffer against a pattern of expansionism by the Tsar.

Marx and Engels also accused Lord Palmerston of playing along with the interests of Russia and being unserious in preparing for the conflict. Marx believed Palmerston to be bribed by Russia, and shared this belief with David Urquhart. Urquhart, for his part, was a British politician who was a major advocate for the Ottoman Empire.

Mikhail Pogodin, a professor of history at Moscow University, gave Nicholas I a summary of Russia's policy towards the Slavs in the war. Nicholas' answer was filled with grievances against the West. Nicholas shared Pogodin's sense that Russia's role as the protector of Orthodox Christians in the Ottoman Empire was not understood and that Russia was unfairly treated by the West. Nicholas especially approved of the following passage:

France takes Algeria from Turkey, and England adds another Indian kingdom to its East Indian empire every year: none of this disturbs the balance of power; meanwhile Russia has occupied Moldavia and Wallachia, temporarily, according to the word of the Russian Sovereign (and who would dare disbelieve him?), that disturbs the balance of power. France occupies Rome and stays there several years during peacetime: that is nothing; yet if Russia so much as thinks of occupying Constantinople, at least in their imagination, and the entire edifice of European politics begins to totter. England declares war on the Chinese, who have allegedly offended her: no one has the right to intervene; but Russia is obliged to ask Europe for permission if it quarrels with its neighbour. England ruins Greece by backing the false claims of a fugitive Jew and burns its fleet: that is a lawful action; but Russia, by virtue of treaties, demands security for millions of Christians, and that is deemed to strengthen its position in the East at the expense of the balance of power. The Austrian Empire is perishing—yet all the Western powers remain silent, harboring no fear that the balance of power might be upset by its collapse; on the contrary, Lord Palmerston even seeks to exacerbate its difficulties—whereas the mere thought of Turkey losing a single province, or the Sultan’s sovereign rights being diminished, makes Europe tremble for its own safety.

Mikhail Pogodin's memorandum to Nicholas I, 1853

Russia was militarily weak, technologically backward and administratively incompetent. Despite its grand ambitions toward the south, it had not built its railway network in that direction, and its communications were poor. Its bureaucracy was riddled with graft, corruption and inefficiency and was unprepared for war. Its navy was weak and technologically backward. Its army, although very large, suffered from colonels who pocketed their men's pay, from poor morale, and from a technological deficit relative to Britain and France. By the war's end, the profound weaknesses of the Russian armed forces had become readily apparent, and the Russian leadership was determined to reform it.

However, no matter how great the problems of Russia were, Russia believed those of the Ottomans were greater. "In a one-to-one fight Nikolai (Tsar) had no doubt of beating the Ottoman armies and navy". Russian foreign policy failed to understand the importance of Britain's trade interests and did not understand the changes in the situation after the conclusion of the Anglo-Ottoman Treaty in 1838 (see Treaty of Balta Liman). Russia attempted to "honestly" negotiate with the United Kingdom on the partition of the Ottoman Empire and made concessions to eliminate all objections from the United Kingdom.

"The Tsar Nicholas had always, as we have seen, been anxious to maintain a cordial understanding with England in regard to the Eastern Question, and early in the spring of 1853 he had a series of interviews with Sir George Hamilton Seymour, then British ambassador at St. Petersburg." Emperor Nicholas I assured that he did not intend to seize Constantinople and territories in the Balkans, he himself offered Britain to take over Egypt and Crete. Concessions at the conclusion of the London Straits Convention were made earlier in 1841. "By signing the convention, the Russians had given up their privileged position in the Ottoman Empire and their control of the Straits, all in the hope of improving relations with Britain and isolating France". But Britain after 1838 was interested in preserving the integrity of the Ottoman Empire and rejected all Russian proposals. "The fall of the Ottoman Empire was not, however, a requirement of British policy in the East. A weak Ottoman state best suited British interests".

=== Immediate causes of war ===
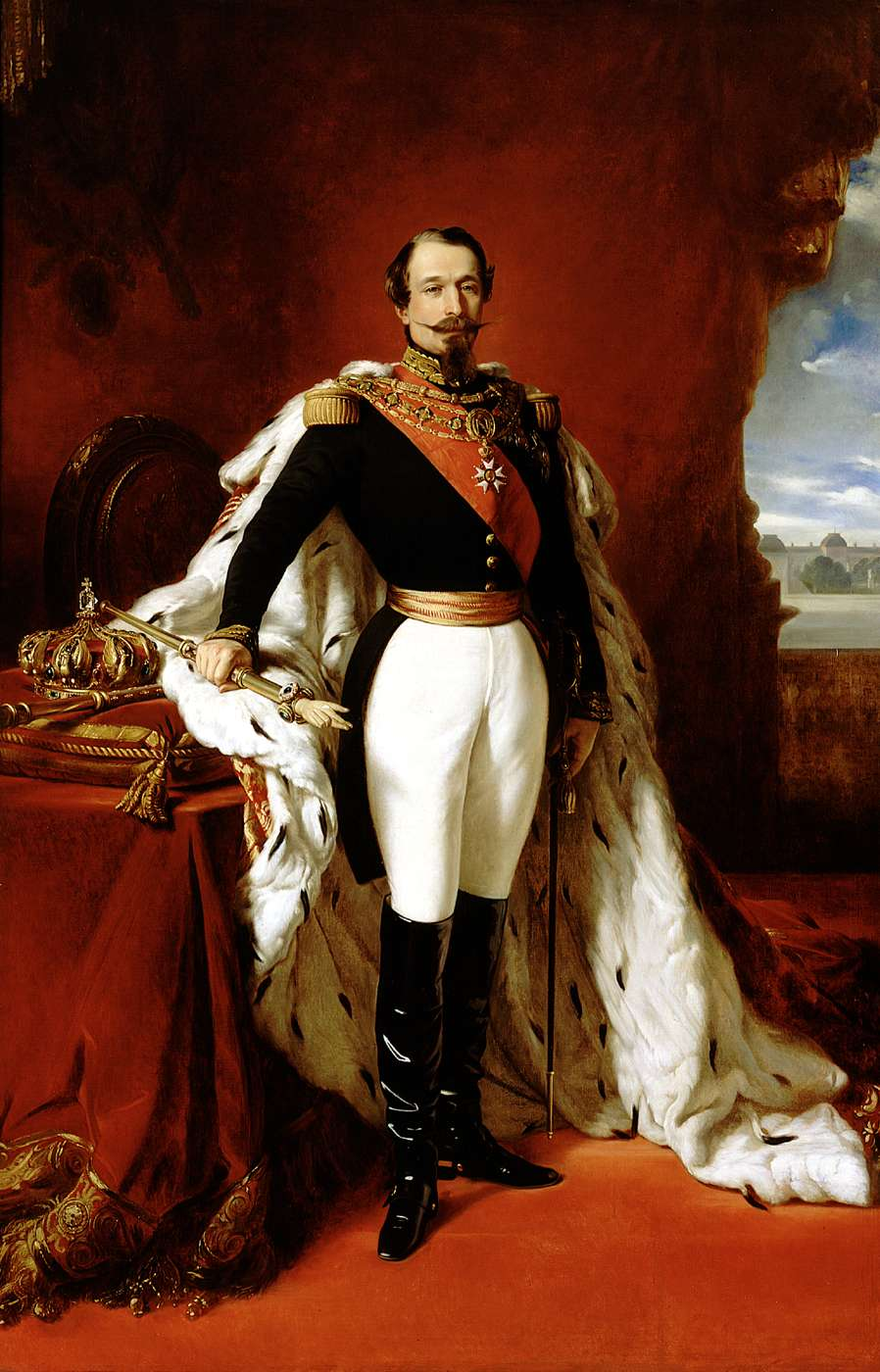
French Emperor Napoleon III in 1853

French Emperor Napoleon III's ambition to restore France's grandeur initiated the immediate chain of events that led to France and Britain declaring war on Russia on 27 and 28 March 1854, respectively. He pursued Catholic support by asserting France's "sovereign authority" over the Christian population of Palestine, to the detriment of Russia (the sponsor of Eastern Orthodoxy). To achieve that, he in May 1851 appointed Charles, marquis de La Valette, a zealous leading member of the Catholic clericalists, as his ambassador to the Sublime Porte of the Ottoman Empire.

Russia disputed that attempted change in authority. Referring to two previous treaties (one from 1757 and the Treaty of Küçük Kaynarca from 1774), the Ottomans reversed their earlier decision, renounced the French treaty and declared that Russia was the protector of the Orthodox Christians in the Ottoman Empire.

Napoleon III responded with a show of force by sending the ship of the line Charlemagne to the Black Sea and thereby violated the London Straits Convention. The gunboat diplomacy show of force, together with money, induced Ottoman Sultan Abdülmecid I to accept a new treaty confirming France and the Catholic Church's supreme authority over Christian holy places, including the Church of the Nativity, which had been held by the Greek Orthodox Church.

Tsar Nicholas I then deployed his 4th and 5th Army Corps along the River Danube in Wallachia, as a direct threat to the Ottoman lands south of the river. He had Foreign Minister Count Karl Nesselrode undertake talks with the Ottomans. Nesselrode confided to Seymour:

[The dispute over the holy places] had assumed a new character—that the acts of injustice towards the Greek church which it had been desired to prevent had been perpetrated and consequently that now the object must be to find a remedy for these wrongs. The success of French negotiations at Constantinople was to be ascribed solely to intrigue and violence—violence which had been supposed to be the ultima ratio of kings, being, it had been seen, the means which the present ruler of France was in the habit of employing in the first instance.

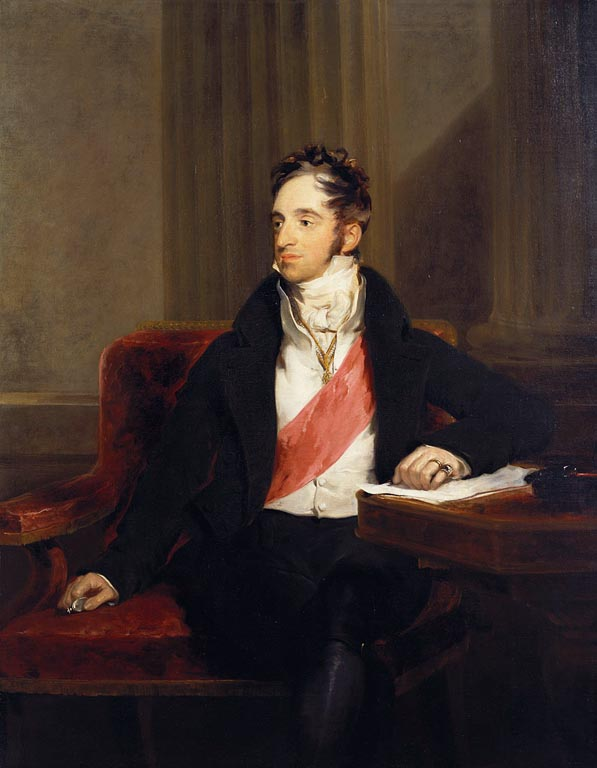
For forty years (1816–56) Karl Nesselrode guided Russian policy as foreign minister

The agreement referred to by the French was in 1740. At present most historians (except for the new Russian Orthodox nationalists) accept that the question of the holy places was no more than a pretext for the Crimean War. As conflict emerged over the issue of the holy places, Nicholas I and Nesselrode began a diplomatic offensive, which they hoped would prevent either British or French interference in any conflict between Russia and the Ottomans and prevent both from forming an anti-Russian alliance.

Nicholas began courting Britain by means of conversations with Seymour in January and February 1853. Nicholas insisted that he no longer wished to expand the Russian Empire but that he had an obligation to the Christian communities in the Ottoman Empire. He next dispatched a highly-abrasive diplomat, Prince Menshikov, on a special mission to the Ottoman Sublime Porte in February 1853. By previous treaties, the sultan had committed "to protect the (Eastern Orthodox) Christian religion and its churches". Menshikov demanded a Russian protectorate over all 12 million Orthodox Christians in the Ottoman Empire with control of the Orthodox Church's hierarchy. A compromise was reached regarding Orthodox access to the Holy Land, but the Sultan, strongly supported by the British ambassador, Stratford Canning, 1st Viscount Stratford de Redcliffe, rejected the most sweeping demands.

Russian historian Vinogradov V.N. point out that Menshikov's demands did not go beyond the limits of previous treaties. "The agreement was reached on the administration of church rites of both clergy in respected temples and, secondly, that the tsar rejected the idea of expanding his right of patronage and, in fact, insisted on confirming the terms of the Kucuk-Kaynardzhiy treaty of 1774, which allowed giving advice to the Sultan, but did not oblige them to accept".

"By the early 1850s Stratford Canning had become far more than an ambassador or adviser to the Porte. The 'Great Elchi', or Great Ambassador, as he was known in Constantinople, had a direct influence on the policies of the Turkish government. (...) His presence was a source of deep resentment among the Sultan's ministers, who lived in terror of a personal visit from the dictatorial ambassador".

Nicholas fumed at "the infernal dictatorship of this Redcliffe" whose name and political ascendancy at the Porte personified for him the whole Eastern Question, The British and the French sent in naval task forces to support the Ottomans, as Russia had prepared to seize the Danubian Principalities.

All the calculations of the Russian emperor turned out to be erroneous. Britain refused his proposals, it was not possible to prevent the Anglo-French rapprochement, Austria opposed his policy, the Ottoman Empire showed intransigence. On the contrary, a favourable situation was developing for Britain. Britain had great naval power and a powerful economy, but did not have a strong land army. The alliance with France, which had a strong land army, made it possible to strike at Russia. "With the help of French infantry, it was possible to overturn Russia's positions with one blow"

== First hostilities ==
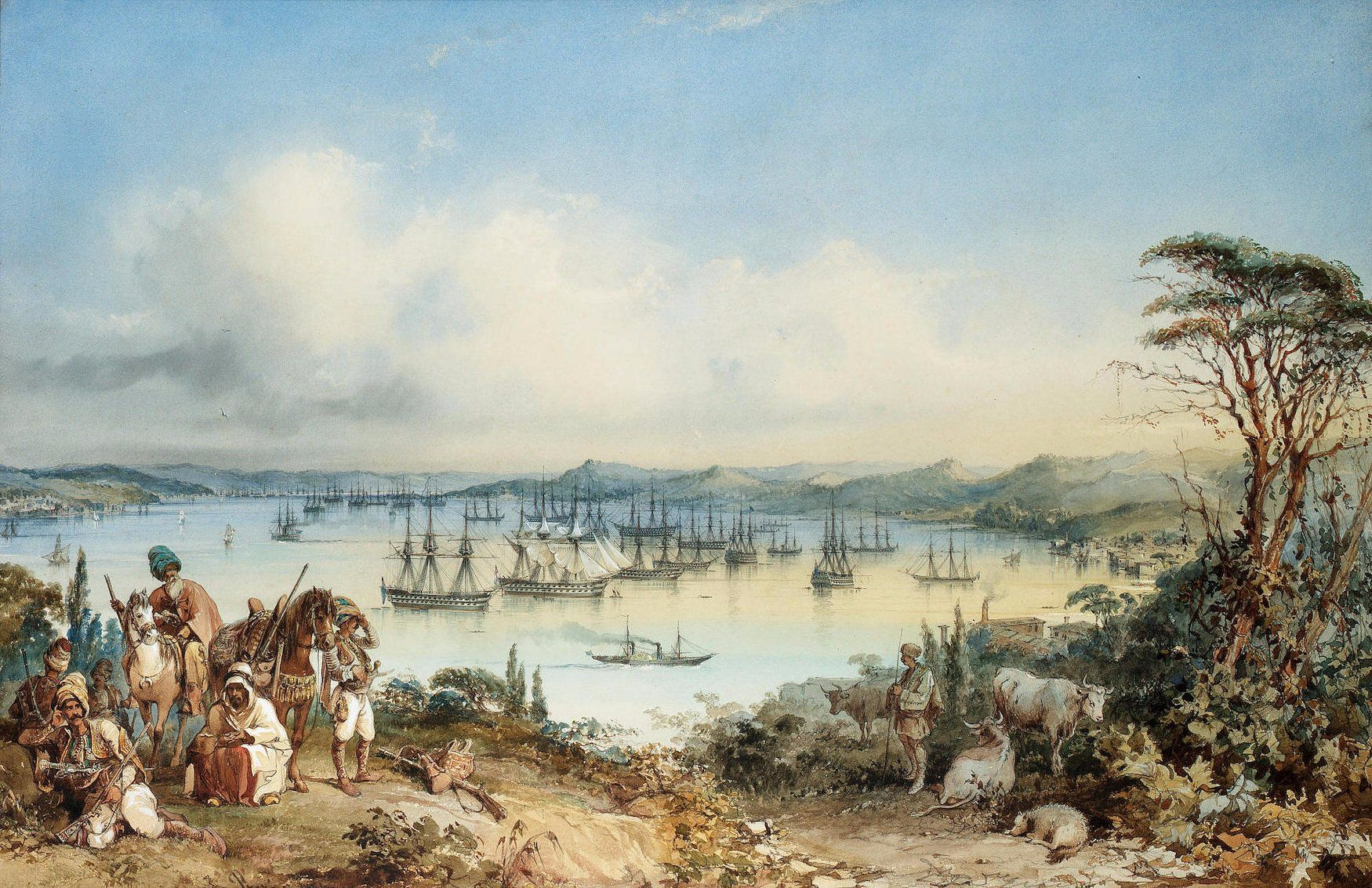
British warships anchored in the Bosphorus, late 1853, the prelude to the Crimean War. Painted by Amedeo Preziosi.

In February 1853, the British government of Prime Minister Lord Aberdeen reappointed Lord Stratford as British ambassador to the Ottoman Empire. Having resigned the ambassadorship in January, he had been replaced by Colonel Rose as chargé d'affaires. Lord Stratford then turned around, sailed back to Constantinople, arriving there on 5 April 1853 and convinced the Sultan there to reject the Russian treaty proposal as compromising Ottoman independence. The Leader of the Opposition in the British House of Commons, Benjamin Disraeli, blamed Aberdeen's and Stratford's actions for making war inevitable, which started the process that would force the Aberdeen government to resign in January 1855 over the war.

Shortly after the Tsar had learned of the failure of Menshikov's diplomacy toward the end of June 1853, he sent armies under the commands of Field Marshal Ivan Paskevich and General Mikhail Gorchakov across the River Prut into the Ottoman-controlled Danubian Principalities of Moldavia and Wallachia. Fewer than half of the 80,000 Russian soldiers who crossed the Prut in 1853 survived. By far, nearly all of the deaths would result from sickness, rather than action, since the Russian Army still suffered from medical services that ranged from bad to none.

Russia had obtained recognition from the Ottoman Empire of the Tsar's role as special guardian of the Orthodox Christians in Moldavia and Wallachia. Russia now used the Sultan's failure to resolve the issue of the protection of the Christian sites in the Holy Land as a pretext for Russian occupation of those Danubian provinces. Nicholas believed that the European powers, especially Austria, would not object strongly to the annexation of a few neighbouring Ottoman provinces, especially since Russia had assisted Austria's efforts in suppressing the Hungarian Revolution in 1849.

The United Kingdom, hoping to maintain the Ottoman Empire as a bulwark against the expansion of Russian power in Asia, sent a fleet to the Dardanelles, where it joined a fleet sent by France.

=== Battle of Sinop ===
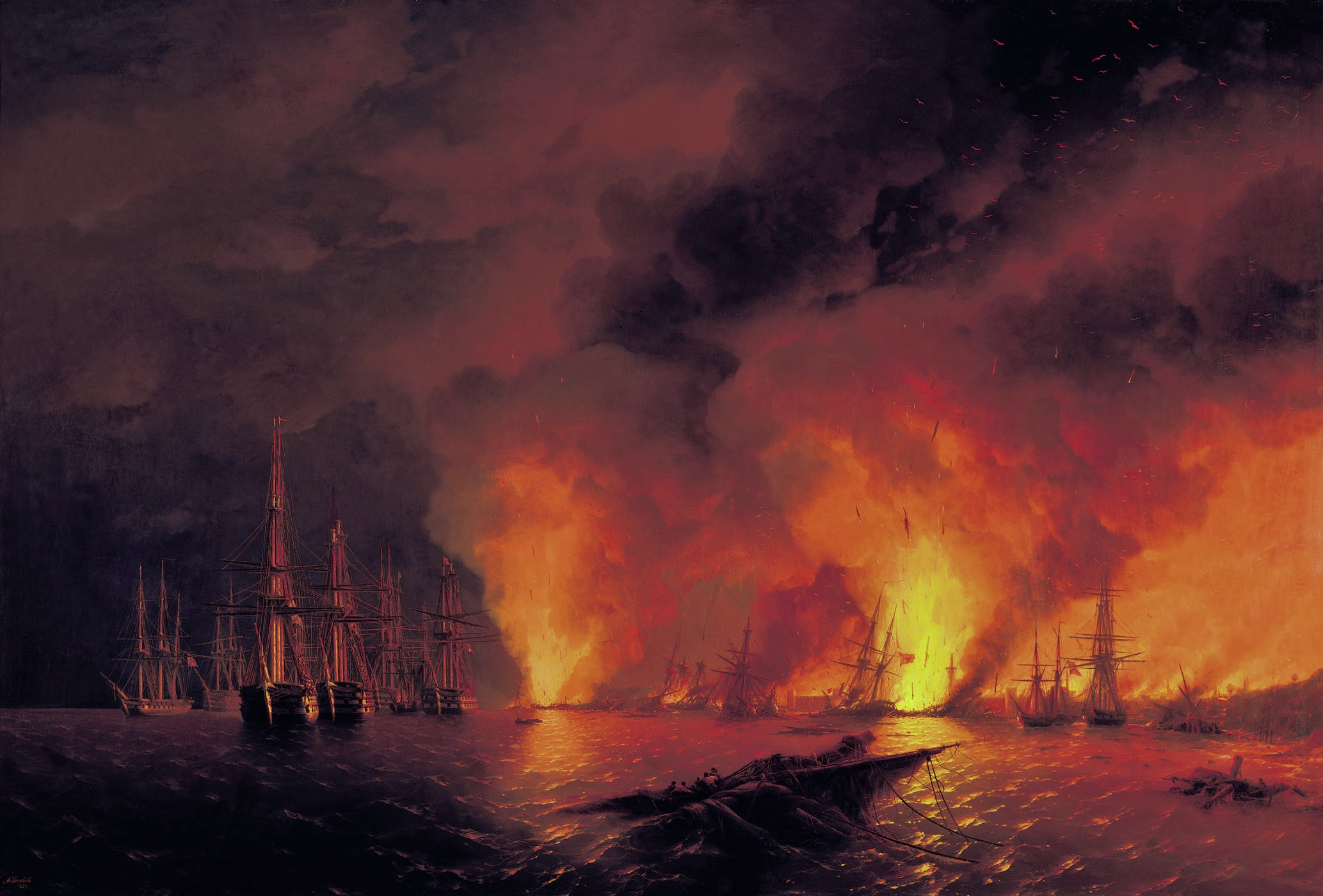
The Russian destruction of the Ottoman fleet at the Battle of Sinop on 30 November 1853 sparked the war. Painting by Ivan Aivazovsky.

The European powers continued to pursue diplomatic avenues. The representatives of the four Great Powers (the United Kingdom, France, Austria and Prussia) met in Vienna, where they drafted a note, which they hoped would be acceptable to both the Russians and the Ottomans. The peace terms arrived at by the four powers at the Vienna Conference (1853) were delivered to the Russians by Austrian foreign minister Count Karl von Buol on 5 December 1853.

The note met with the approval of Nicholas I, but Abdülmecid I rejected the proposal since he felt that the document's poor phrasing left it open to many different interpretations. The United Kingdom, France and Austria united in proposing amendments to mollify the Sultan, but the court of St. Petersburg ignored their suggestions. The United Kingdom and France then set aside the idea of continuing negotiations, but Austria and Prussia did not believe that the rejection of the proposed amendments justified the abandonment of the diplomatic process.

On 23 November, a small Russian naval force discovered the Ottoman fleet harboured in Sinop and began a blockade. Once the Russian blockade was reinforced, a squadron of six Russian ships of the line supported by five smaller warships, assaulted the harbour on 30 November 1853. During the Battle of Sinop, the Russian squadron destroyed a patrol squadron of 11 Ottoman warships—mostly frigates—while they were anchored in port under defence of the onshore artillery garrison.

The Ottoman fleet suffered a crushing defeat. The Russian victory in the naval battle of Sinope was called "the massacre of Sinope". Although Russia and the Ottoman Empire were already at war, and there was no evidence of Russian atrocities, the phrase was used as propaganda in the West. The press in both United Kingdom and France used Sinop as the casus belli ("cause of war") to shape the public opinion in favour of war against Russia. By 28 March 1854, after Russia ignored an Anglo-French ultimatum to withdraw from the Danubian Principalities, the United Kingdom and France had both declared war.

=== Dardanelles ===
Britain was concerned about Russian activity and Sir John Burgoyne, a senior advisor to Lord Aberdeen, urged for the Dardanelles to be occupied and works of sufficient strength to be built to block any Russian move to capture Constantinople and gain access to the Mediterranean. The Corps of Royal Engineers sent men to the Dardanelles, and Burgoyne went to Paris and met with the British ambassador and the French emperor. Lord Cowley wrote on 8 February to Burgoyne, "Your visit to Paris has produced a visible change in the Emperor's views, and he is making every preparation for a land expedition in case the last attempt at negotiation should break down".

Burgoyne and his team of engineers inspected and surveyed the Dardanelles area in February. They were fired on by Russian riflemen when they went to Varna. A team of sappers arrived in March, and major building works commenced on a seven-mile line of defence, which was designed to block the Gallipoli Peninsula. French sappers worked on half of the line, which was finished in May.

=== Peace attempts ===
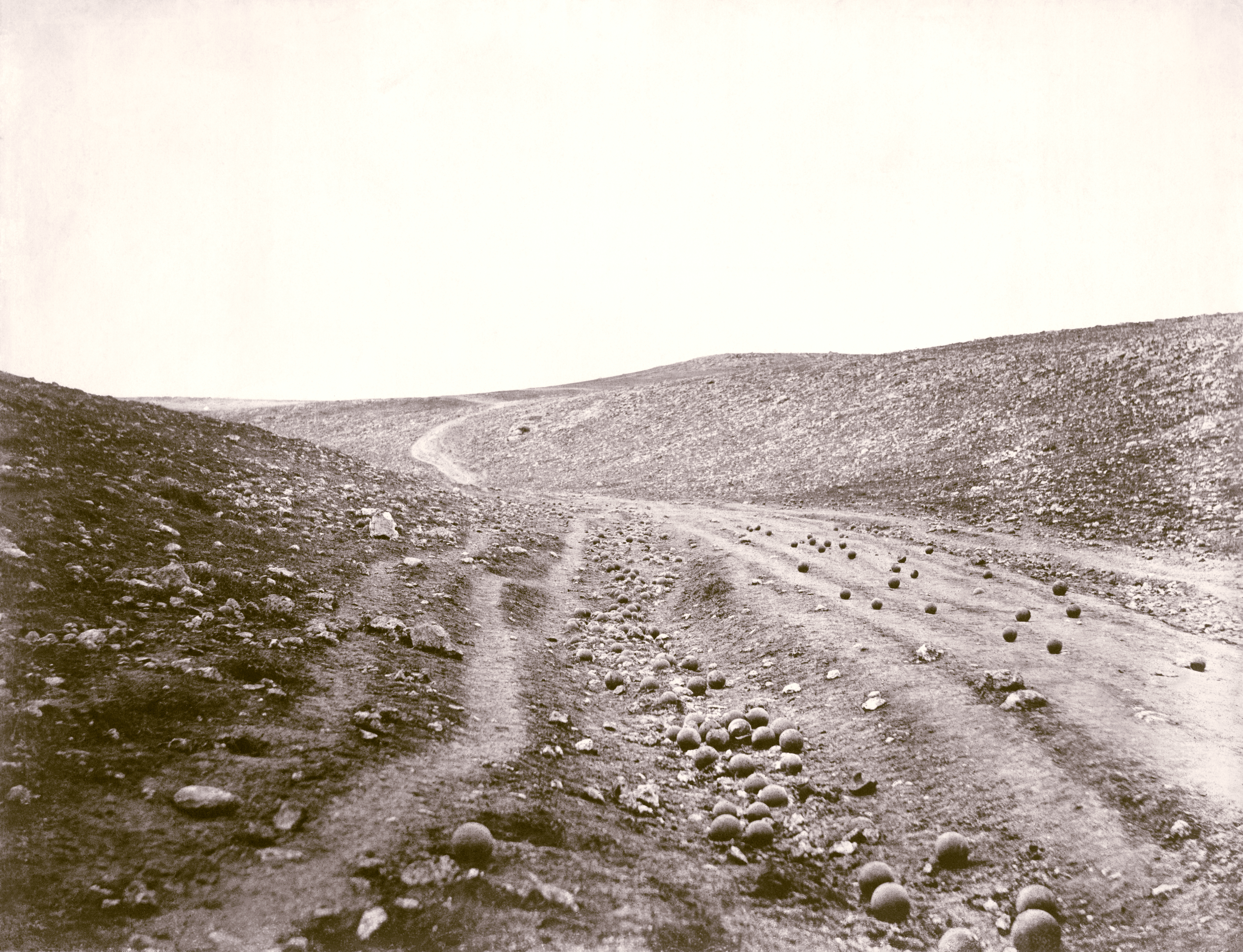
Valley of the Shadow of Death, by Roger Fenton, with cannon balls in a ravine, one of the most famous pictures of the Crimean War

Nicholas felt that because of Russian assistance in suppressing the Hungarian Revolution of 1848, Austria would side with him or at the very least remain neutral. Austria, however, felt threatened by the Russian troops in the Balkans. On 27 February 1854, the United Kingdom and France demanded the withdrawal of Russian forces from the principalities. Austria supported them and, without declaring war on Russia, refused to guarantee its neutrality. Russia's rejection of the ultimatum proved to be the justification used by Britain and France to enter the war.

Russia soon withdrew its troops from the Danubian Principalities, which were then occupied by Austria for the duration of the war. That removed the original grounds for war, but the British and the French continued with hostilities. Determined to address the Eastern Question by putting an end to the Russian threat to the Ottomans, the allies in August 1854 proposed the "Four Points" for ending the conflict in addition to the Russian withdrawal:

- Russia was to give up its protectorate over the Danubian Principalities.
- The Danube was to be opened up to foreign commerce.
- The Straits Convention of 1841, which allowed only Ottoman and Russian warships in the Black Sea, was to be revised.
- Russia was to abandon any claim granting it the right to interfere in Ottoman affairs on behalf of Orthodox Christians.

Those points, particularly the third, would require clarification through negotiations, which Russia refused. The allies, including Austria, therefore agreed that Britain and France should take further military action to prevent further Russian aggression against the Ottomans. Britain and France agreed on the invasion of Crimea as the first step.

== Battles ==
A map of the Crimean War, 1853

A map of the Crimean War, 1854

A map of the Crimean War, 1855

=== Danube campaign ===
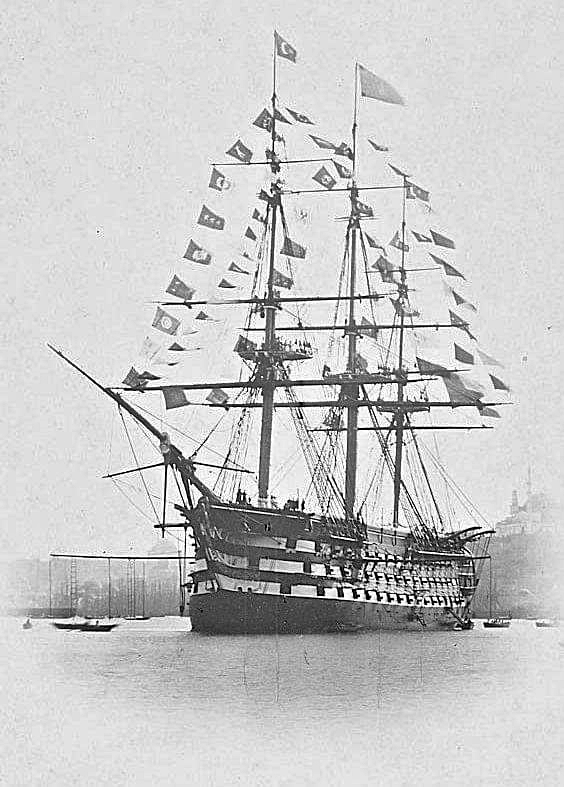
The Ottoman ship Mahmudiye (1829) participated in numerous important naval battles, including the Siege of Sevastopol

The Danube campaign opened when the Russians occupied the Danubian Principalities of Moldavia and Wallachia in July 1853, which brought their forces to the north bank of the River Danube. In response, the Ottoman Empire also moved its forces up to the river, establishing strongholds at Vidin in the west and Silistra in the east, near the mouth of the Danube. The Ottoman move up the River Danube was also of concern to the Austrians, who moved forces into Transylvania in response. However, the Austrians had begun to fear the Russians more than the Ottomans. Indeed, like the British, the Austrians were now coming to see that an intact Ottoman Empire was necessary as a bulwark against the Russians. Accordingly, Austria resisted Russian diplomatic attempts to join the war but remained neutral during the Crimean War.

After the Ottoman ultimatum in September 1853, forces under Ottoman General Omar Pasha crossed the Danube at Vidin and captured Calafat in October 1853. Simultaneously, in the east, the Ottomans crossed the Danube at Silistra and attacked the Russians at Oltenița. The resulting Battle of Oltenița was the first engagement since the declaration of war. The Russians counterattacked but were beaten back. On 31 December 1853, the Ottoman forces at Calafat moved against the Russian force at Chetatea or Cetate, a small village nine miles north of Calafat, and engaged it on 6 January 1854. The battle began when the Russians made a move to recapture Calafat. Most of the heavy fighting took place in and around Chetatea until the Russians were driven out of the village. Despite the setback at Chetatea, Russian forces on 28 January 1854 laid siege to Calafat. The siege would continue until May 1854 when it was lifted by the Russians. The Ottomans would also later beat the Russians in battle at Caracal.

In early 1854, the Russians again advanced by crossing the River Danube into the Turkish province of Dobruja. By April 1854, the Russians had reached the lines of Trajan's Wall, where they were finally halted. In the centre, the Russian forces crossed the Danube and laid siege to Silistra from 14 April with 60,000 troops. The defenders had 15,000 troops and supplies for three months. The siege was lifted on 23 June 1854. The British and the French could not then take the field for lack of equipment.

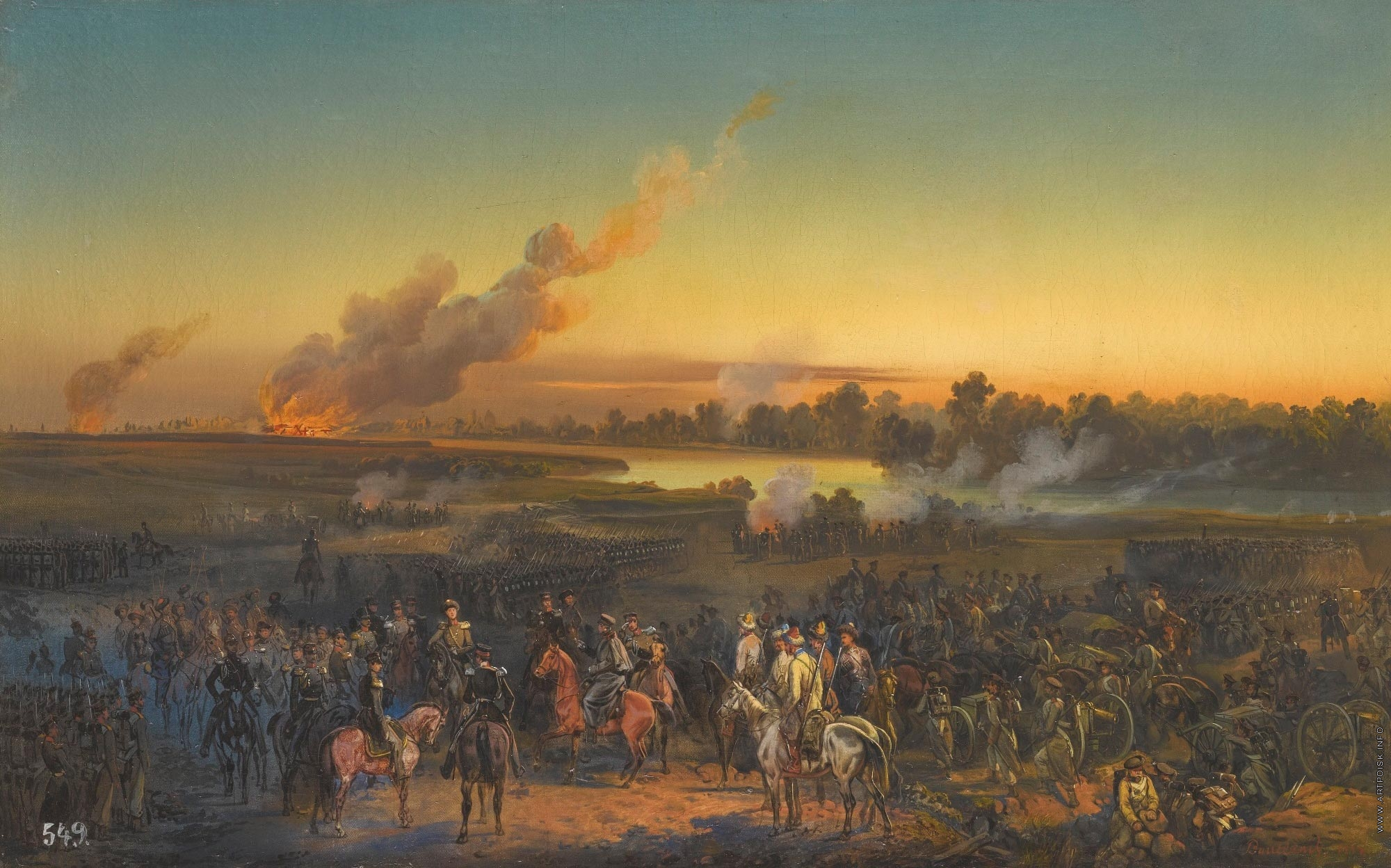
The Siege of Silistra, by Bogdan Willewalde

In the west, the Russians were dissuaded from attacking Vidin by the presence of the Austrian forces, which had swollen to 280,000 men. On 28 May 1854, a protocol of the Vienna Conference was signed by Austria and Russia. One of the aims of the Russian advance had been to encourage the Orthodox Christian Serbs and Bulgarians who were living under Ottoman rule to rebel. When the Russian troops crossed the River Prut into Moldavia, the Orthodox Christians showed no interest in rising up against the Ottomans. Adding to Nicholas I's worries was the concern that Austria would enter the war against the Russians and attack his armies on the western flank. Indeed, after attempting to mediate a peaceful settlement between Russia and the Ottomans, the Austrians entered the war on the side of the Ottomans with an attack against the Russians in the Danubian Principalities which threatened to cut off the Russian supply lines. Accordingly, the Russians were forced to raise the siege of Silistra on 23 June 1854 and to begin abandoning the principalities. The lifting of the siege reduced the threat of a Russian advance into Bulgaria.

In June 1854, the Allied expeditionary force landed at Varna, a city on the Black Sea's western coast, but made little advance from its base there. Karl Marx was noted to have quipped that "there they are, the French doing nothing and the British helping them as fast as possible". In July 1854, the Ottomans, under Omar Pasha, crossed the Danube into Wallachia and on 7 July 1854 engaged the Russians in the city of Giurgiu and conquered it. The capture of Giurgiu by the Ottomans immediately threatened Bucharest in Wallachia with capture by the same Ottoman army. On 26 July 1854, Nicholas I, responding to an Austrian ultimatum, ordered the withdrawal of Russian troops from the principalities. Also, in late July 1854, following up on the Russian retreat, the French staged an expedition against the Russian forces still in Dobruja, but it was a failure.

By then, the Russian withdrawal was complete, except for the fortress towns of northern Dobruja, and Russia's place in the principalities was taken by the Austrians as a neutral peacekeeping force. There was little further action on that front after late 1854, and in September, the allied force boarded ships at Varna to invade Crimea.

=== Black Sea theatre ===
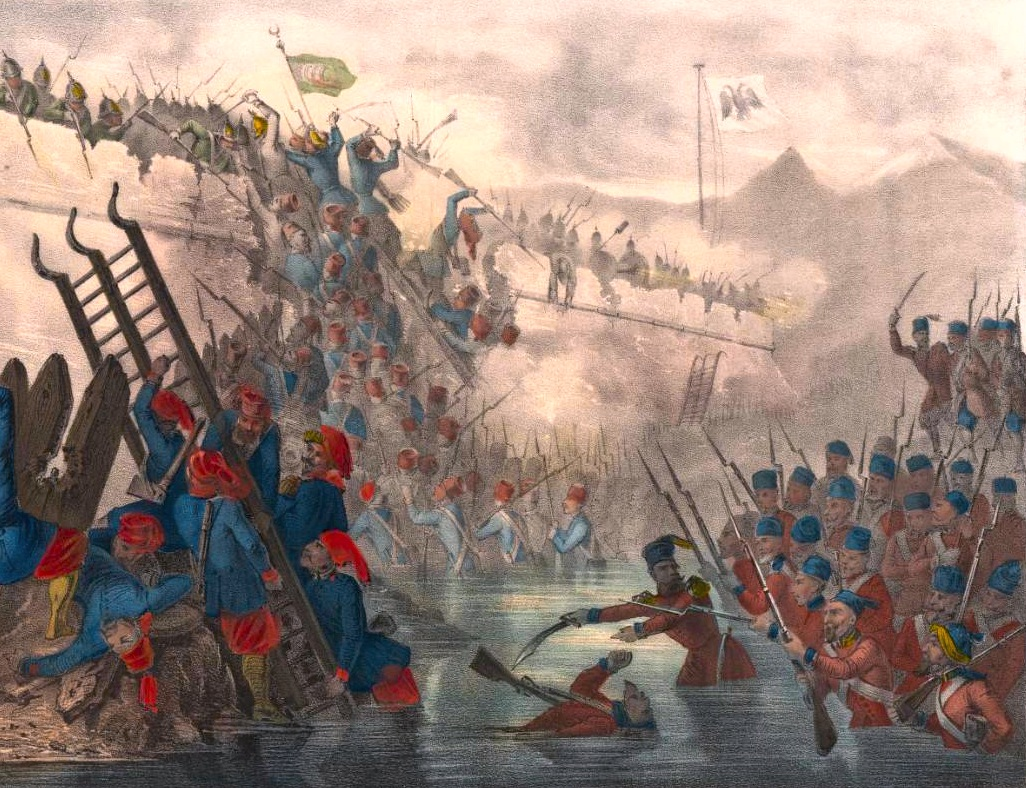
Turkish troops storming Fort Shefketil

The naval operations of the Crimean War commenced with the dispatch in mid-1853 of the French and the British fleets to the Black Sea region, to support the Ottomans and to dissuade the Russians from encroachment. By June 1853, both fleets had been stationed at Besikas Bay, outside the Dardanelles. With the Russian occupation of the Danube Principalities in July 1853, they moved to the Bosphorus, and on 3 January 1854, they entered the Black Sea.

Meanwhile, the Russian Black Sea Fleet operated against Ottoman coastal traffic between Constantinople and the Caucasus ports, and the Ottoman fleet sought to protect the supply line. The clash came on 30 November 1853, when a Russian fleet attacked an Ottoman force in the harbour at Sinop and destroyed it at the Battle of Sinop. The battle outraged British public opinion, which called for war. There was little additional naval action until March 1854, when after the declaration of war, the British frigate HMS Furious was fired on outside Odessa Harbour. In response an Anglo-French fleet bombarded the port and caused much damage to the town. To show support for the Ottomans after the Battle of Sinop, on 22 December 1853, the Anglo-French squadron entered the Black Sea and the steamship HMS Retribution approached the Port of Sevastopol. Its commander received an ultimatum not to allow any ships in the Black Sea.

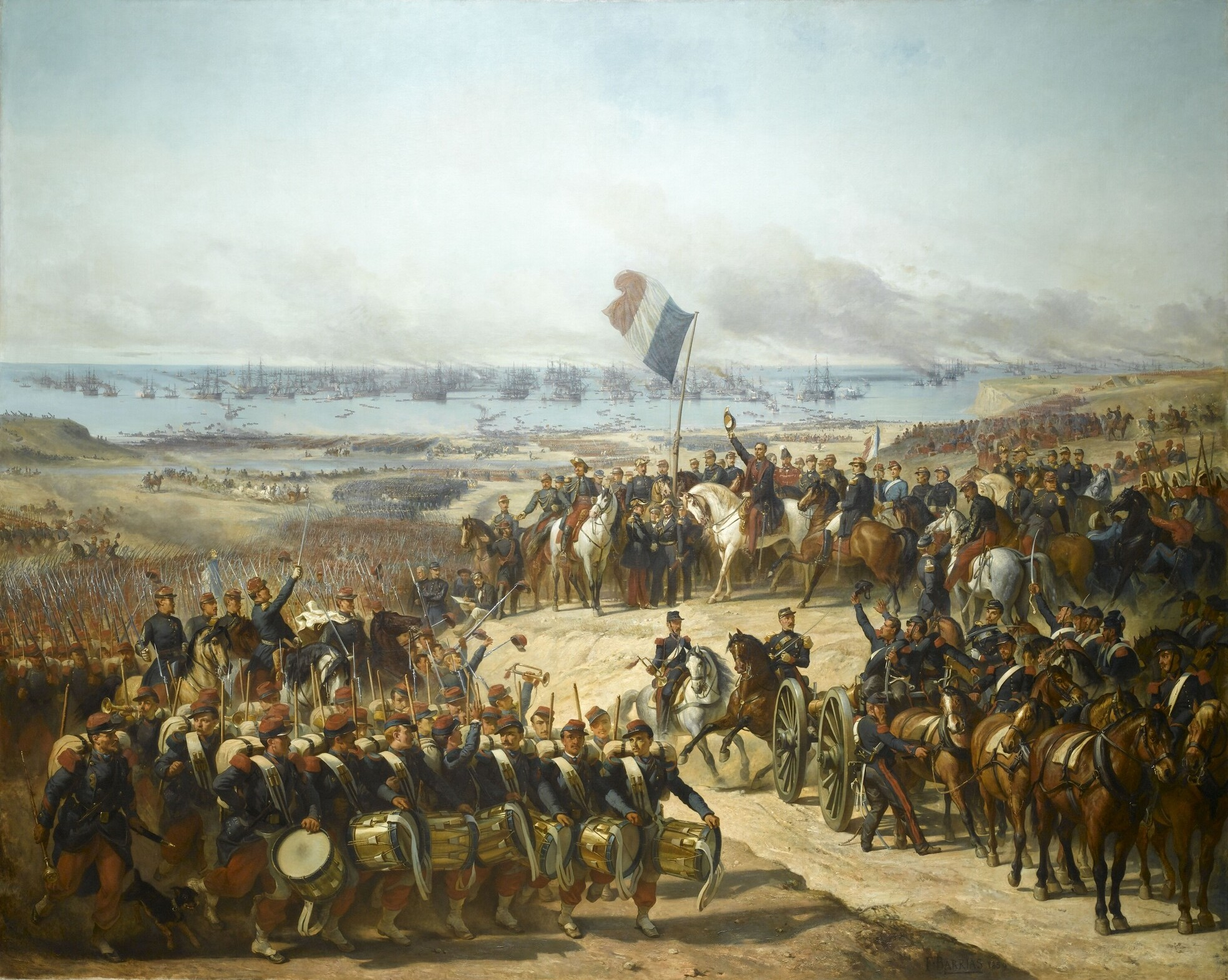
The French landing near Yevpatoria, Crimea, 1854

In June, the fleets transported the Allied expeditionary forces to Varna to support the Ottoman operations on the Danube. In September they again transported the armies, this time to Crimea. The Russian fleet then declined to engage the allies but preferred to maintain a "fleet in being", a strategy that failed when Sevastopol, the main port and the base of most of the Black Sea fleet, came under siege. The Russians were reduced to scuttling their warships as blockships after they had stripped them of their guns and men to reinforce batteries on shore. During the siege, the Russians lost four 110- or 120-gun, three-decker ships of the line, twelve 84-gun two-deckers and four 60-gun frigates in the Black Sea, as well as a large number of smaller vessels. During the rest of the campaign, the allied fleets remained in control of the Black Sea and ensured that the various fronts were kept supplied.

In May 1855, the allies successfully invaded Kerch and operated against Taganrog in the Sea of Azov. In September, they moved against Russian installations in the Dnieper estuary by attacking Kinburn in the first use of ironclad ships in naval warfare.

=== Crimean campaign ===
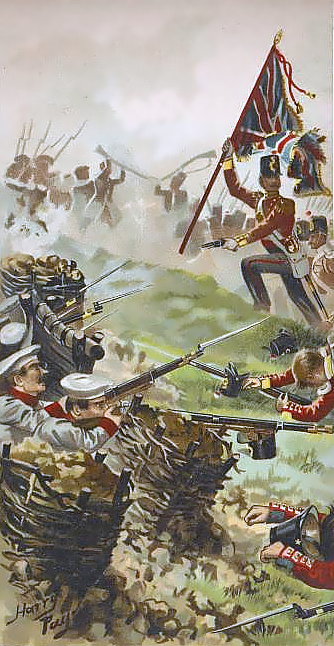
Russo-British skirmish during the Crimean War. By Harry Payne

The Russians evacuated Wallachia and Moldavia in late July 1854. Therefore, the immediate cause of war had now been withdrawn, and the war might have then ended. However, war fever among the public in both Britain and France had been whipped up by the press in both countries to the degree that politicians found it untenable to propose immediately ending the war. The coalition government of George Hamilton-Gordon, 4th Earl of Aberdeen, fell on 30 January 1855 on a no-confidence vote, as Parliament voted to appoint a committee to investigate the mismanagement of the war.

French and British officers and engineers were sent on 20 July on Fury, a wooden Bulldog-class paddle sloop, to survey the harbour of Sevastopol and the coast near it. They managed to get close to the harbour mouth to inspect the formidable batteries. Returning, they reported that they believed that 15,000–20,000 troops were encamped. Ships were prepared to transport horses, and siege equipment was both manufactured and imported.

Oriental Army of the Crimean campaign by Gustav Bartsch. From left to right: Admiral Ferdinand-Alphonse Hamelin, Lord Lucan, Lord Raglan, Admiral Dundas, Sir John Campbell, Duke of Cambridge, Lord Cardigan, Ismail Pasha, Omer Pasha, Muhlis Pasha (Grigore Sturdza), Sultan Abdülmecid I, Said-Bey (Vasile Obedeanu), Ahmed Pasha, col. Desmaret, Marshal Baraguey d'Hilliers, Prince Napoleon, col. Trochu, Marshal de Saint-Arnaud, general Bosquet, general de Canrobert

The Crimean campaign opened in September 1854. In seven columns, 360 ships sailed, each steamer towing two sailing ships. Anchoring on 13 September in the bay of Yevpatoria, the town surrendered, and 500 marines landed to occupy it. The town and the bay would provide a fallback position in case of disaster. The ships then sailed east to make the landing of the allied expeditionary force on the sandy beaches of Kalamita Bay, on the south-west coast of Crimea. The landing surprised the Russians, as they had expected a landing at Katcha. The last-minute change proved that Russia had known the original campaign plan. There was no sign of the enemy and so all of the invading troops landed on 14 September 1854. It took another four days to land all of the stores, equipment, horses and artillery.

The landing took place north of Sevastopol and so the Russians had arrayed their army in expectation of a direct attack. The allies advanced and on the morning of 20 September came up to the River Alma and engaged the Russian Army. The Russian position was strong, but after three hours, the allied frontal attack had driven the Russians out of their dug-in positions with losses of 6,000 men. The Battle of the Alma resulted in 3,300 Allied losses. Failing to pursue the retreating forces was one of many strategic errors made during the war, and the Russians themselves noted that if the allies had pressed south that day, they would have easily captured Sevastopol.

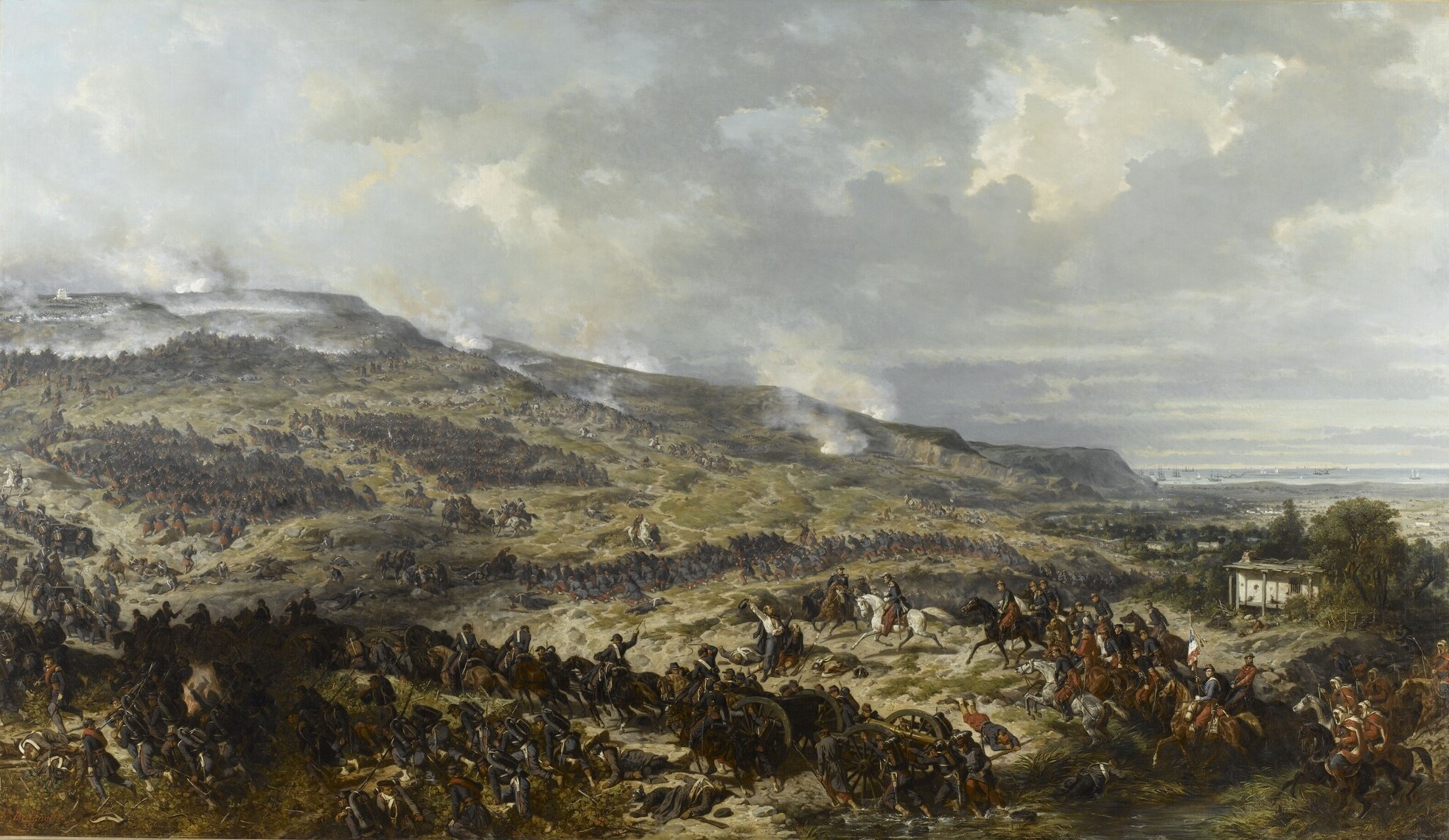
The Battle of the Alma

Believing the northern approaches to the city too well defended, especially because of the presence of a large star fort and the city being on the south side of Sevastopol Bay, Sir John Burgoyne, the engineer advisor, recommended for the allies attack to Sevastopol from the south. The joint commanders, Raglan and Saint-Arnaud, agreed. On 25 September, the whole army began to march southeast and encircled the city from the south after it had established port facilities at Balaclava for the British and at Kamiesch (Russian: Камышовая бухта, romanized: Kamyshovaya bukhta) for the French. The Russians retreated into the city. On 26 September, Saint-Arnaud gave up his command to Canrobert.

The Allied armies moved without problems to the south, and the heavy artillery was brought ashore with batteries and connecting trenches built. By 10 October, some batteries were ready, and by 17 October, when the bombardment commenced—126 guns were firing, 53 of them French. The fleet meanwhile engaged the shore batteries. The British bombardment worked better than that of the French, who had smaller-calibre guns. The fleet suffered high casualties during the day. The British wanted to attack that afternoon, but the French wanted to defer the attack.

A postponement was agreed, but on the next day, the French were still not ready. By 19 October the Russians had transferred some heavy guns to the southern defences and had outgunned the allies.

Reinforcements for the Russians gave them the courage to send out probing attacks. The Allied lines, beginning to suffer from cholera as early as September, were stretched. The French, on the west, had less to do than the British on the east, with their siege lines and the large nine-mile open wing back to their supply base on the south coast.

=== Battle of Balaclava ===
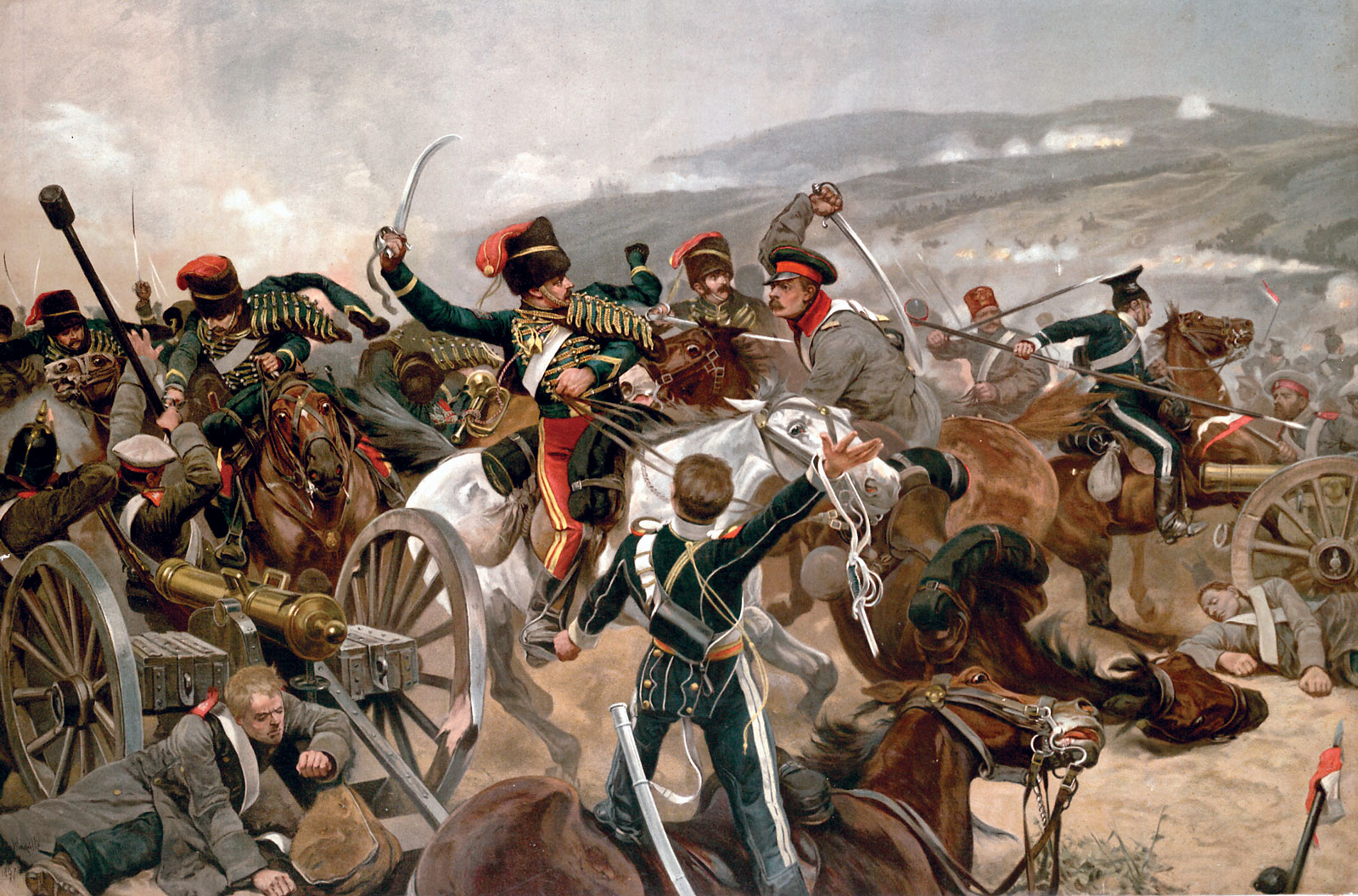
British cavalry charging against Russian forces at Balaclava

A large Russian assault on the allied supply base to the southeast at Balaclava was rebuffed on 25 October 1854. The Battle of Balaclava is remembered in Britain for the actions of two British units. At the start of the battle, a large body of Russian cavalry charged the 93rd Highlanders, who were posted north of the village of Kadikoi. Commanding them was Sir Colin Campbell. Rather than "form square", the traditional method of repelling cavalry, Campbell took the risky decision to have his Highlanders form a single line two men deep. Campbell had seen the effectiveness of the new Minié rifles with which his troops were armed at the Battle of Alma, a month earlier, and he was confident that his men could beat back the Russians. His tactics succeeded. From up on the ridge to the west, the Times correspondent William Howard Russell saw the Highlanders as a "thin red streak topped with steel", a phrase which soon became the "Thin Red Line".

Soon afterward, a Russian cavalry movement was countered by the Heavy Brigade, which charged and fought hand to hand until the Russians retreated. That caused a more widespread Russian retreat, including a number of their artillery units. After the local commanders had failed to take advantage of the retreat, Lord Raglan sent out orders to move up and to prevent the withdrawal of naval guns from the recently captured redoubts on the heights. Raglan could see those guns because of his position on the hill. In the valley, that view was obstructed, and the wrong guns were in sight to the left. The local commanders ignored the demands, which led to the British aide-de-camp, Captain Louis Nolan, personally delivering the quickly-written and confusing order to attack the artillery. When Lord Lucan questioned to which guns the order referred, the aide-de-camp pointed to the first Russian battery that he could see and allegedly said "There is your enemy, there are your guns", because of his obstructed view, which were wrong. Lucan then passed the order to the Earl of Cardigan, which resulted in the Charge of the Light Brigade.

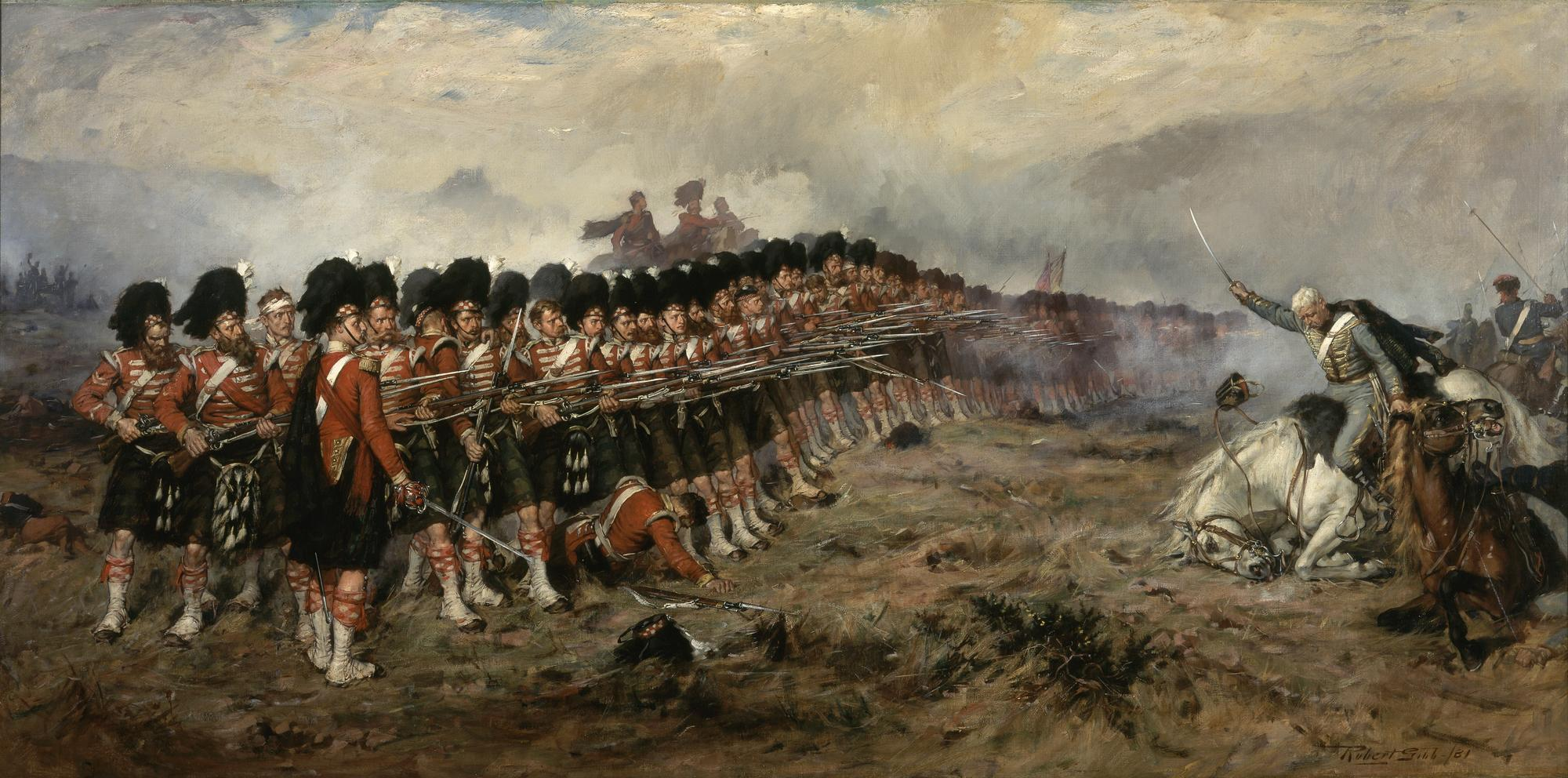
The Thin Red Line at the Battle of Balaclava, where the 93rd Sutherland Highlanders held off Russian cavalry.

In that charge, Cardigan formed up his unit and charged the length of the Valley of the Balaclava, under fire from Russian batteries in the hills. The charge of the Light Brigade caused 278 casualties of the 700-man unit. The Light Brigade was memorialised in the famous poem by Alfred, Lord Tennyson, "The Charge of the Light Brigade". Although traditionally, the charge of the Light Brigade was looked upon as a glorious but wasted sacrifice of good men and horses, recent historians believe that the charge of the Light Brigade succeeded in at least some of its objectives. The aim of any cavalry charge is to scatter the enemy's lines and frighten the enemy off the battlefield. The Charge of the Light Brigade so unnerved the Russian cavalry, which had been routed by the Charge of the Heavy Brigade, that the Russians were set to full-scale flight.

The shortage of men led to the failure of the British and the French to follow up on the Battle of Balaclava, which led directly to the much bloodier Battle of Inkerman. On 5 November 1854, the Russians attempted to raise the siege at Sevastopol with an attack against the allies, which resulted in another allied victory.

=== Winter of 1854–1855 ===
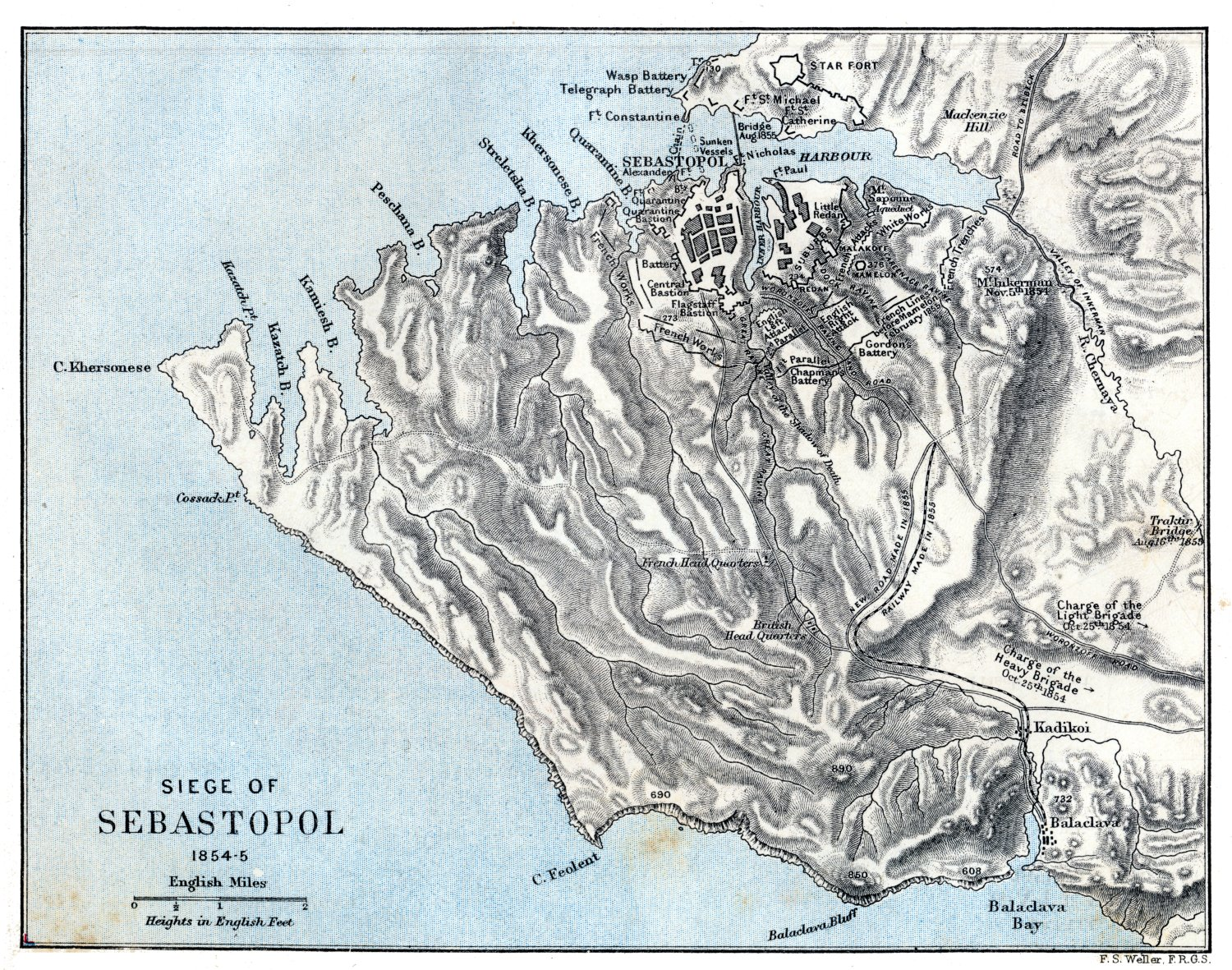
Historical map showing the territory between Balaclava and Sevastopol at the time of the Siege of Sevastopol

Winter weather and a deteriorating supply of troops and materiel on both sides led to a halt in ground operations. Sevastopol remained invested by the allies, whose armies were hemmed in by the Imperial Russian Army in the interior. On 14 November, the "Balaklava Storm", a major weather event, sank 30 allied transport ships, including HMS Prince, which was carrying a cargo of winter clothing.

The storm and the heavy traffic caused the road from the coast to the troops to disintegrate into a quagmire, which required engineers to devote most of their time to its repair, including by quarrying stone. A tramway was ordered and arrived in January with a civilian engineering crew, but it took until March before it had become sufficiently advanced to be of any appreciable value. An electrical telegraph was also ordered, but the frozen ground delayed its installation until March, when communications from the base port of Balaklava to the British HQ was established. The pipe-and-cable-laying plough failed because of the hard frozen soil, but nevertheless 21 miles (34 km) of cable were laid.

The troops suffered greatly from cold and sickness, and the shortage of fuel led them to start dismantling their defensive gabions and fascines. In February 1855, the Russians attacked the allied base at Eupatoria, where an Ottoman army had built up and was threatening Russian supply routes. The Russians were defeated at the Battle of Eupatoria, leading to a change in their command.

The strain of directing the war had taken its toll on the health of Tsar Nicholas. Full of remorse for the disasters that he had caused, he caught pneumonia and died on 2 March.

=== Siege of Sevastopol ===
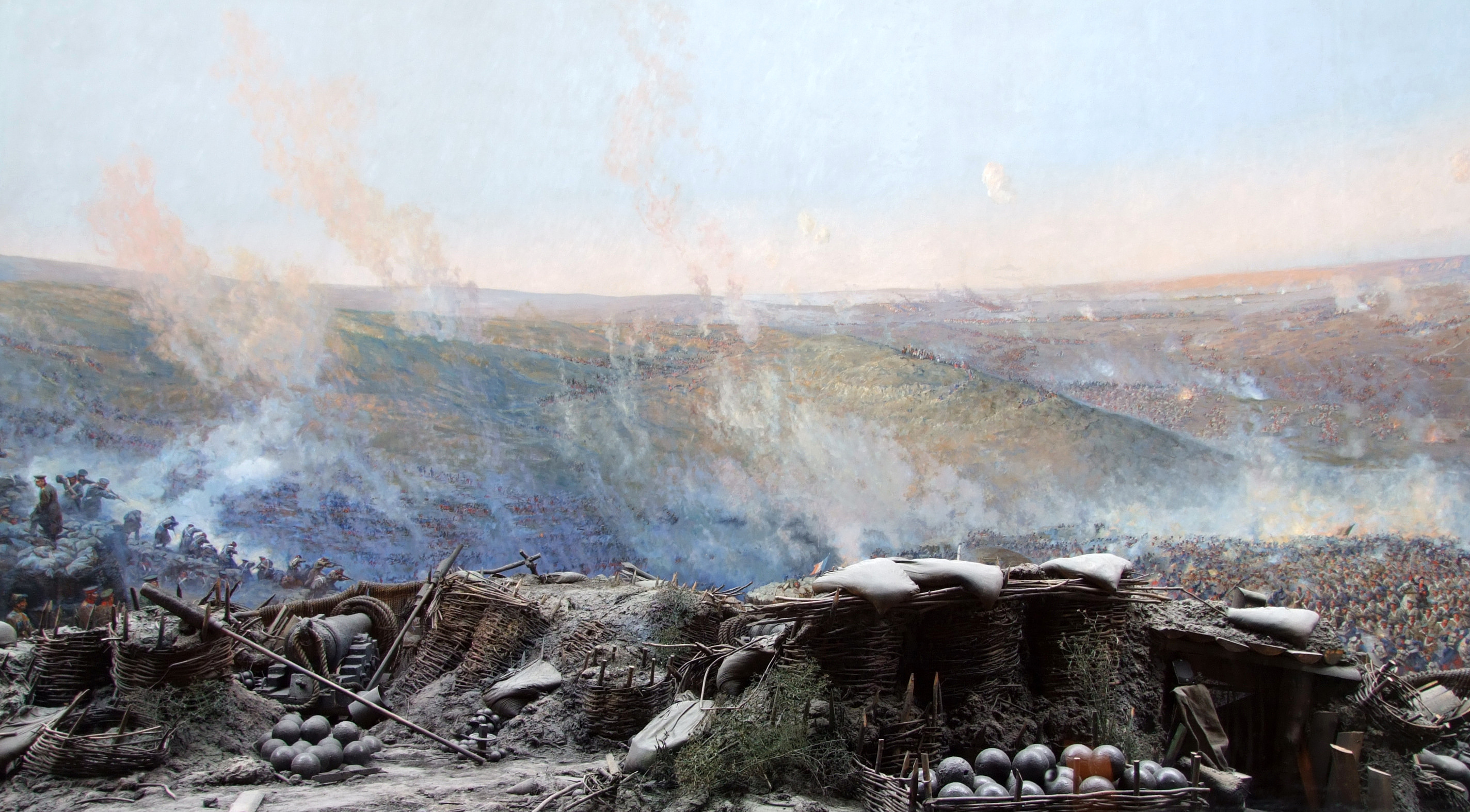
The Siege of Sevastopol panorama by Franz Roubaud

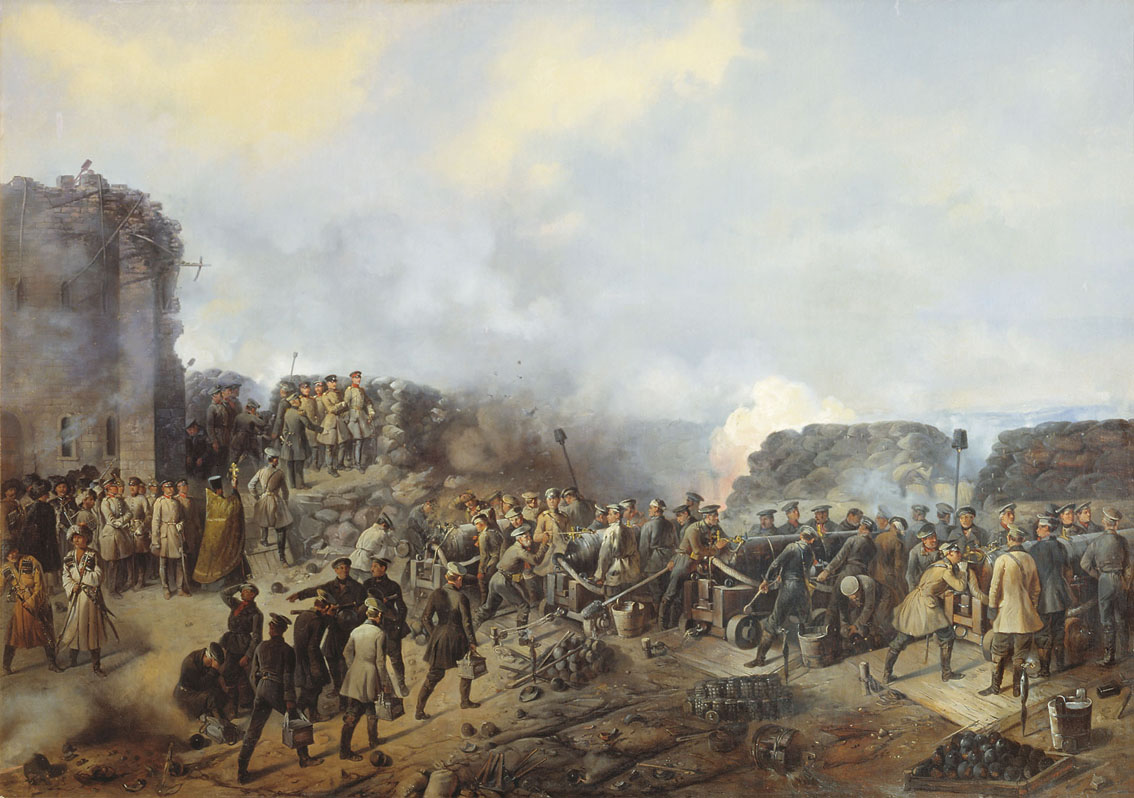
Siege of Sevastopol 1855 by Grigoryi Shukaev

The allies had had time to consider the problem, and the French were brought around to agree that the key to the defence was the Malakoff. Emphasis of the siege at Sevastopol shifted to the British left against the fortifications on Malakoff Hill. In March, there was fighting by the French over a new fort being built by the Russians at Mamelon, on a hill in front of the Malakoff. Several weeks of fighting resulted in little change in the front line, and the Mamelon remained in Russian hands.

In April 1855, the allies staged a second all-out bombardment, which led to an artillery duel with the Russian guns, but no ground assault followed.

On 24 May 1855, 60 ships, containing 7,000 French, 5,000 Turkish and 3,000 British troops, set off for a raid on the city of Kerch, east of Sevastopol, in an attempt to open another front in Crimea and to cut off Russian supplies. When the allies landed the force at Kerch, the plan was to outflank the Russian Army. The landings were successful, but the force made little progress thereafter.

Many more artillery pieces had arrived and had been dug into batteries. The first general assault of Sevastopol took place on 18 June 1855. There is a legend that the assault was scheduled for that date in favour of Napoleon III in the 40th anniversary of the Battle of Waterloo, but the legend is not confirmed by historians. However, the appearance of such a legend is undoubtedly symptomatic since the war in France was understood as a certain revanche for the defeat of 1812.

In June, a third bombardment was followed after two days by a successful attack on the Mamelon, but a follow-up assault on the Malakoff failed with heavy losses. Meanwhile, the garrison commander, Admiral Pavel Nakhimov, fell on 30 June 1855, and Raglan died on 28 June. Losses in those battles were so great that by agreement of military opponents short-term truces for removal of corpses were signed (these truces were described in the work of Leo Tolstoy "Sevastopol Sketches"). The assault was beaten back with heavy casualties and in an undoubted victory for Russia. The Russian Siege of Sevastopol (panorama) depicts the moment of the assault of Sevastopol on 18 June 1855.

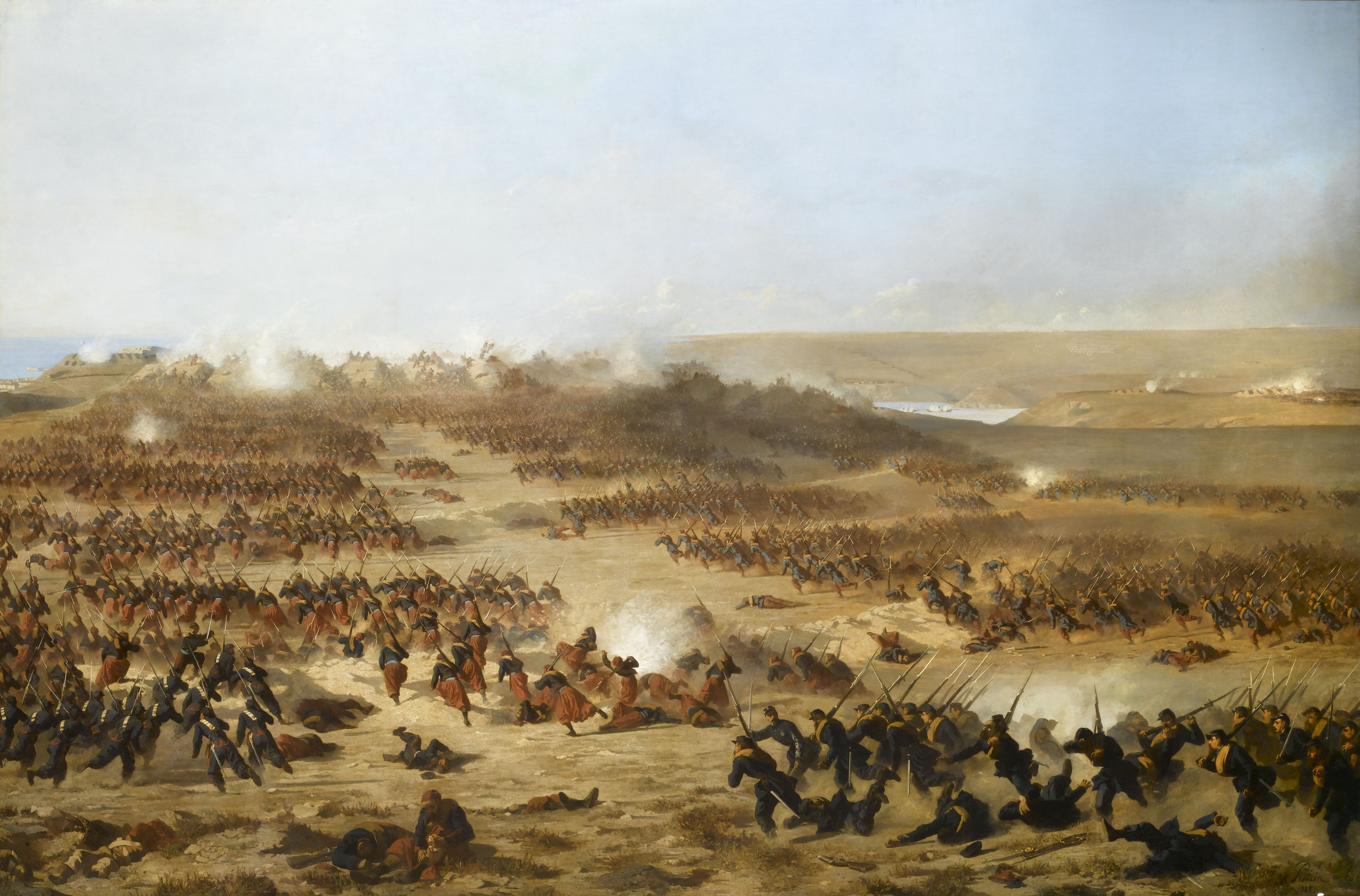
French zouaves attack Russian positions in the Battle of Malakoff

In August, the Russians again made an attack towards the base at Balaclava, which was defended by the French, newly arrived Sardinian and Ottoman troops. The resulting Battle of the Chernaya was a defeat for the Russians, who suffered heavy casualties.

For months, each side had been building forward rifle pits and defensive positions, which resulted in many skirmishes. Artillery fire aimed to gain superiority over the enemy guns. The final assault was made on 5 September, when another French bombardment (the sixth) was followed by an assault by the French Army on 8 September and resulted in the French capture of the Malakoff fort. The Russians failed to retake it and their defences collapsed. Meanwhile, the British assaulted the Great Redan, a Russian defensive battlement just south of the city of Sevastopol, a position that had been attacked repeatedly for months. Whether the British captured the Redan remains in dispute: Russian historians recognise only the loss of the Malakhov Kurgan, a key point of defence, claiming that all other positions were retained. What is agreed is that the Russians abandoned the positions, blew up their powder magazines and retreated to the north. The city finally fell on 9 September 1855, after a 337-day-long siege.

Both sides were now exhausted, and no further military operations were launched in Crimea before the onset of winter. The main objective of the siege was the destruction of the Russian fleet and docks and took place over the winter. On 28 February, multiple mines blew up the five docks, the canal, and three locks.

=== Azov campaign ===
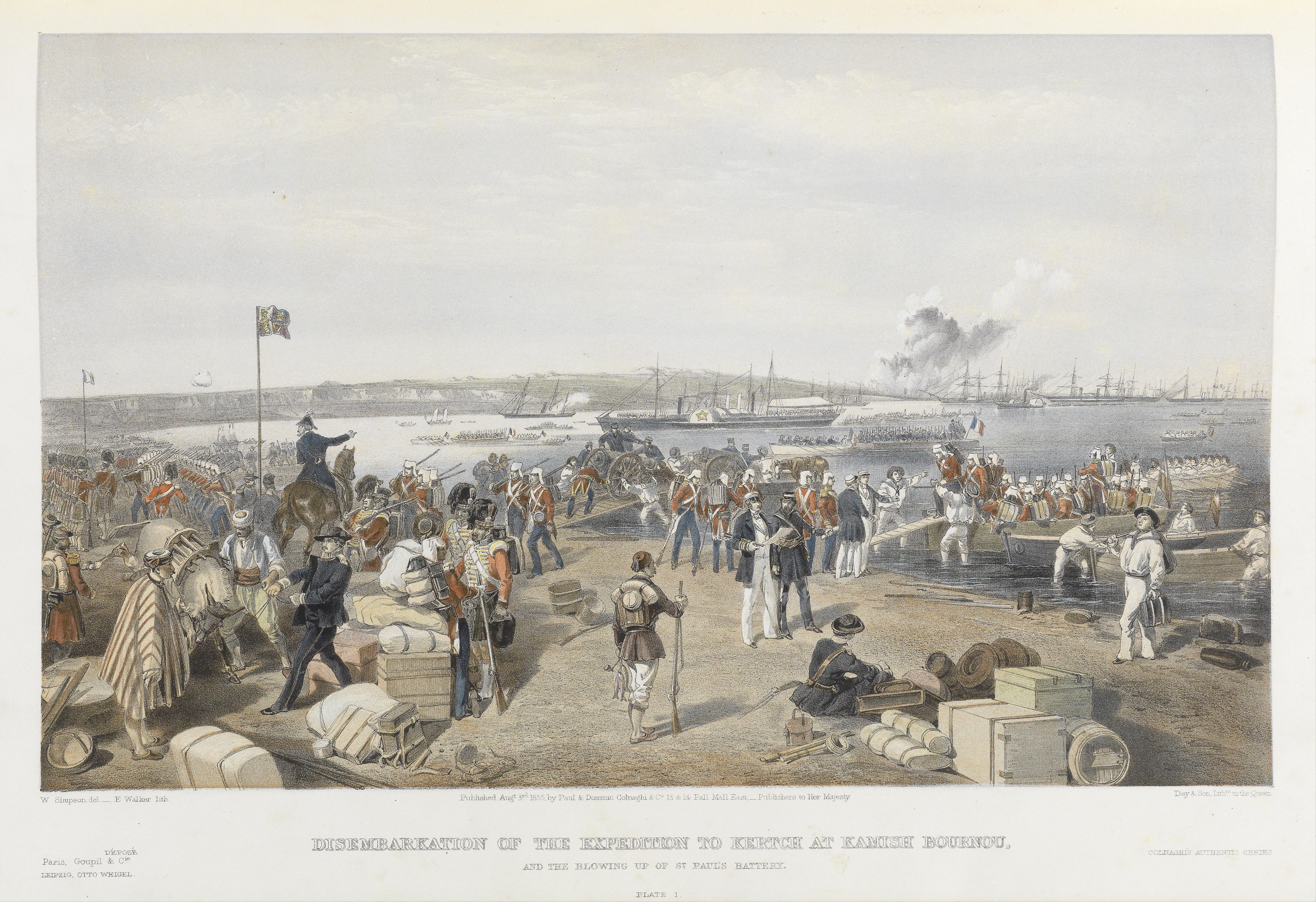
Disembarkation of the expedition to Kerch

In early 1855, the allied Anglo-French commanders decided to send an Anglo-French naval squadron into the Azov Sea to undermine Russian communications and supplies to besieged Sevastopol. On 12 May 1855, Anglo-French warships entered the Kerch Strait and destroyed the coast battery of the Kamishevaya Bay. Once through the Kerch Strait, British and French warships struck at every vestige of Russian power along the coast of the Sea of Azov. Except for Rostov and Azov, no town, depot, building or fortification was immune from attack, and Russian naval power ceased to exist almost overnight. This Allied campaign led to a significant reduction in supplies flowing to the besieged Russian troops at Sevastopol.

On 21 May 1855, the gunboats and armed steamers attacked the seaport of Taganrog, the most important hub near Rostov-on-Don. The vast amounts of food, especially bread, wheat, barley and rye, that were amassed in the city after the outbreak of war were prevented from being exported.

The governor of Taganrog, Yegor Tolstoy, and Lieutenant-General Ivan Krasnov refused an allied ultimatum by responding, "Russians never surrender their cities". The Anglo-French squadron bombarded Taganrog for 6 1/2 hours and landed 300 troops near the Old Stairway in the centre of Taganrog, but they were thrown back by Don Cossacks and a volunteer corps.

In July 1855, the allied squadron tried to go past Taganrog to Rostov-on-Don by entering the River Don through the Mius River. On 12 July 1855 HMS Jasper grounded near Taganrog thanks to a fisherman who moved buoys into shallow water. The Cossacks captured the gunboat with all of its guns and blew it up. The third siege attempt was made 19–31 August 1855, but the city was already fortified, and the squadron could not approach close enough for landing operations. The allied fleet left the Gulf of Taganrog on 2 September 1855, with minor military operations along the Azov Sea coast continuing until late 1855.

=== Caucasus theatre ===
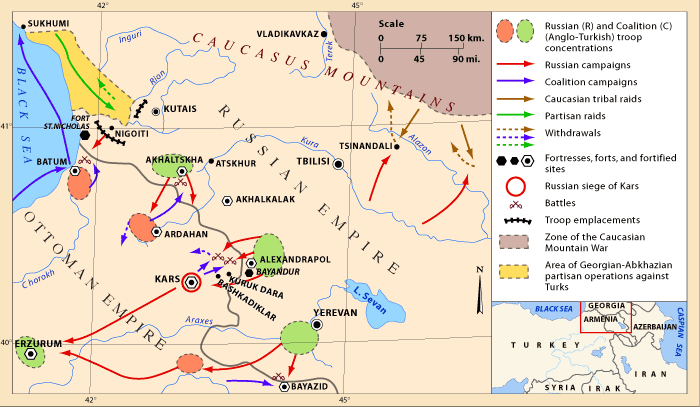
Caucasus front during the Crimean War

As in the previous wars, the Caucasus front was secondary to what happened in the west. Perhaps because of better communications, western events sometimes influenced the east. The main events were the second capture of Kars and a landing on the Georgian coast. Several commanders on both sides were either incompetent or unlucky, and few fought aggressively.

1853: There were four main events. 1. In the north, the Ottomans captured the border fort of Saint Nicholas in a surprise night attack (27/28 October). They then pushed about 20,000 troops across the Choloki river border. Being outnumbered, the Russians abandoned Poti and Redoubt Kali and drew back to Marani. Both sides remained immobile for the next seven months. 2. In the centre the Ottomans moved north from Ardahan to within cannon-shot of Akhaltsike and awaited reinforcements (13 November), but the Russians routed them. The claimed losses were 4,000 Turks and 400 Russians. 3. In the south about 30,000 Turks slowly moved east to the main Russian concentration at Gyumri or Alexandropol (November). They crossed the border and set up artillery south of town. Prince Vakhtang Orbeliani tried to drive them off and found himself trapped. The Ottomans failed to press their advantage; the remaining Russians rescued Orbeliani and the Ottomans retired west. Orbeliani lost about 1,000 men from 5,000. The Russians now decided to advance. The Ottomans took up a strong position on the Kars road and attacked-only to be defeated in the Battle of Başgedikler, losing 6,000 men, half their artillery and all of their supply train. The Russians lost 1,300, including Prince Orbeliani. This was Prince Ellico Orbeliani, whose wife was later kidnapped by Imam Shamil at Tsinandali. 4. At sea the Turks sent a fleet east, which was destroyed by Admiral Nakhimov at Sinope.

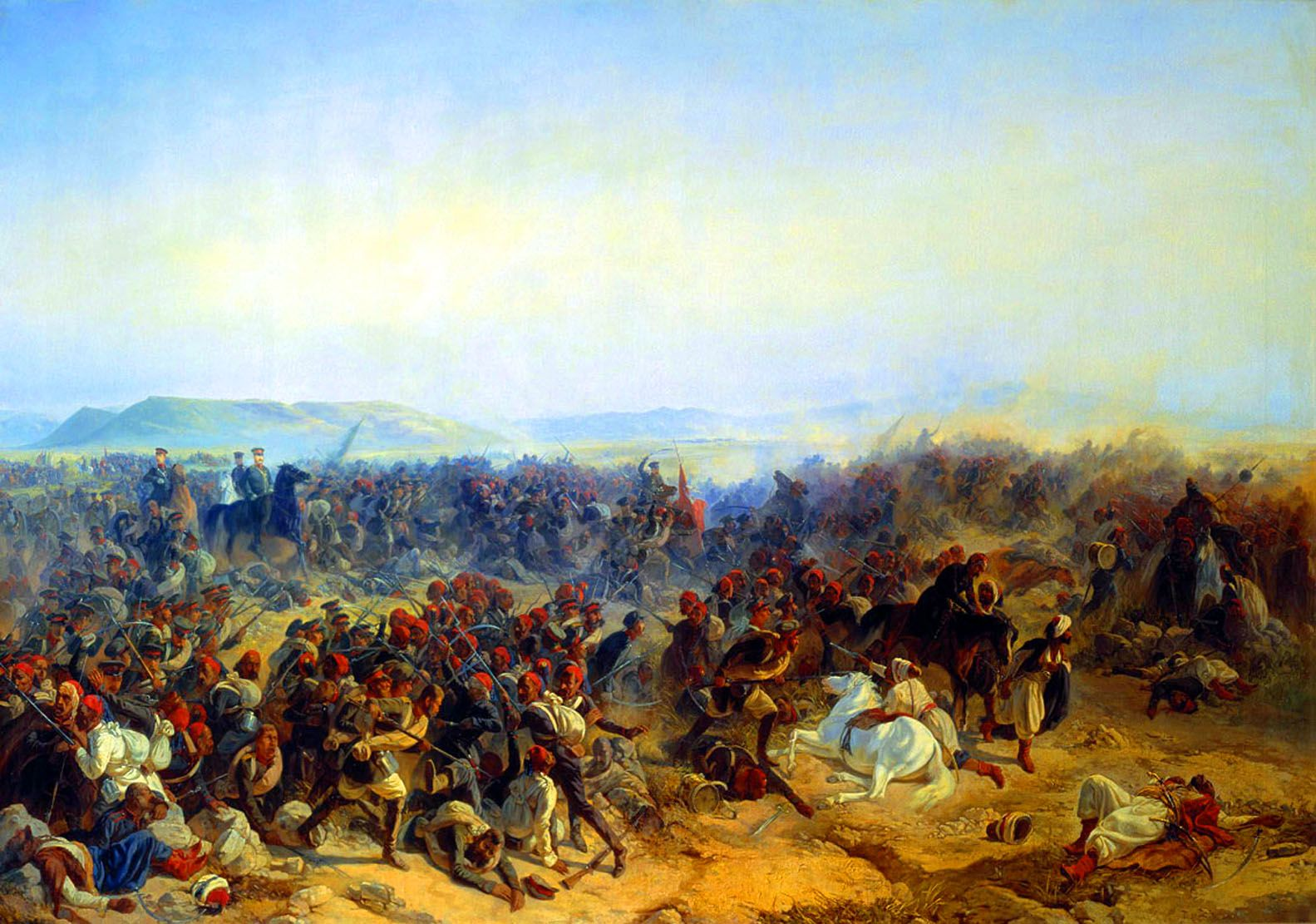
General Bebutashvili defeated the Ottomans at the Battle of Kurekdere.

1854: The British and French declared war on 28 March. Early in the year on 3 January, the Anglo-French fleet appeared in the Black Sea, and the Russians abandoned the Black Sea Defensive Line from Anapa south. Nikolay Muravyov, who replaced Vorontsov, fearing an Anglo-French landing in conjunction with Shamil, 3rd Imam of Dagestan and the Persians, recommended withdrawal north of the Caucasus. For that purpose, he was replaced by Aleksandr Baryatinsky. When the allies chose a land attack on Sevastopol, any plan for a landing in the east was abandoned.

In the north, Georgiy Evseevich Eristov pushed southwest, fought two battles, forced the Ottomans back to Batumi, retired behind the Cholok river and suspended action for the rest of the year (June). In the far south, Wrangel pushed west, fought a battle and occupied Bayazit. In the centre. the main forces stood at Kars and Gyumri. Both slowly approached along the Kars-Gyumri road and faced each other, neither side choosing to fight (June–July). On 4 August, Russian scouts saw a movement which they thought was the start of a withdrawal, the Russians advanced and the Ottomans attacked first. They were defeated and lost 8,000 men to the Russian 3,000. Also, 10,000 irregulars deserted to their villages. Both sides withdrew to their former positions. About then, the Persians made a semi-secret agreement to remain neutral in exchange for the cancellation of the indemnity from the previous war.

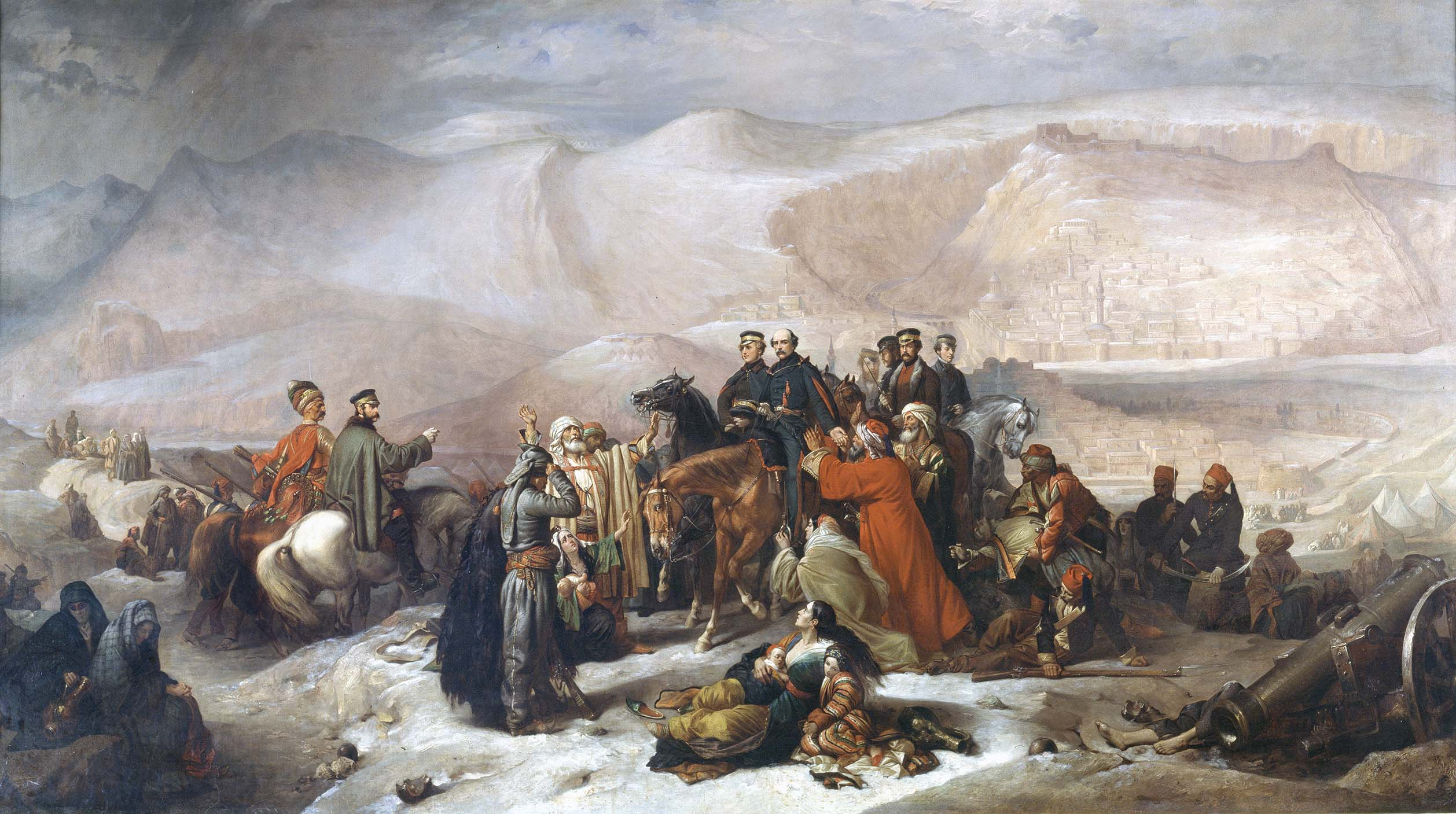
The Capitulation of Kars by Thomas Jones Barker, 1860

1855: Siege of Kars: Up to May 1855, Ottomans forces in the east were reduced from 120,000 to 75,000, mostly by disease. The local Armenian population kept Muravyov well-informed about the Ottomans at Kars and he judged they had about five months of supplies. He therefore decided to control the surrounding area with cavalry and starve them out. He started in May and by June was south and west of the town. A relieving force fell back and there was a possibility of taking Erzurum, but Muravyov chose not to. In late September he learned of the fall of Sevastopol and a Turkish landing at Batum. This led him to reverse policy and try a direct attack. It failed, the Russians losing 8,000 men and the Turks 1,500 (29 September). The blockade continued and Kars surrendered on 28 November.

1855: Georgian coast: Omar Pasha, the Turkish commander at Crimea had long wanted to land in Georgia, but the western powers vetoed it. When they relented in August most of the campaigning season was lost. In 8 September Turks landed at Batum, but the main concentration was at Sukhum Kale. This required a 100-mile march south through a country with poor roads. In essence, it was a military demonstration to frighten the Russian command and force it to lift the siege of the fortress of Kars. "All luck depended on whether Muravyov (the Russian commander) would be scared or not". But the Russian command did not see a serious threat, the Siege of Kars was continued. The Russians planned to hold the line of the Ingur river which separates Abkhazia from Georgia proper. Omar crossed the Ingur on 7 November and then wasted a great deal of time, the Russians doing little. By 2 December he had reached the Tskhenistsqali, the rainy season had started, his camps were submerged in mud and there was no bread. Learning of the fall of Kars he withdrew to the Ingur. The Russians did nothing and he evacuated to Batum in February of the following year.

=== Baltic theatre ===
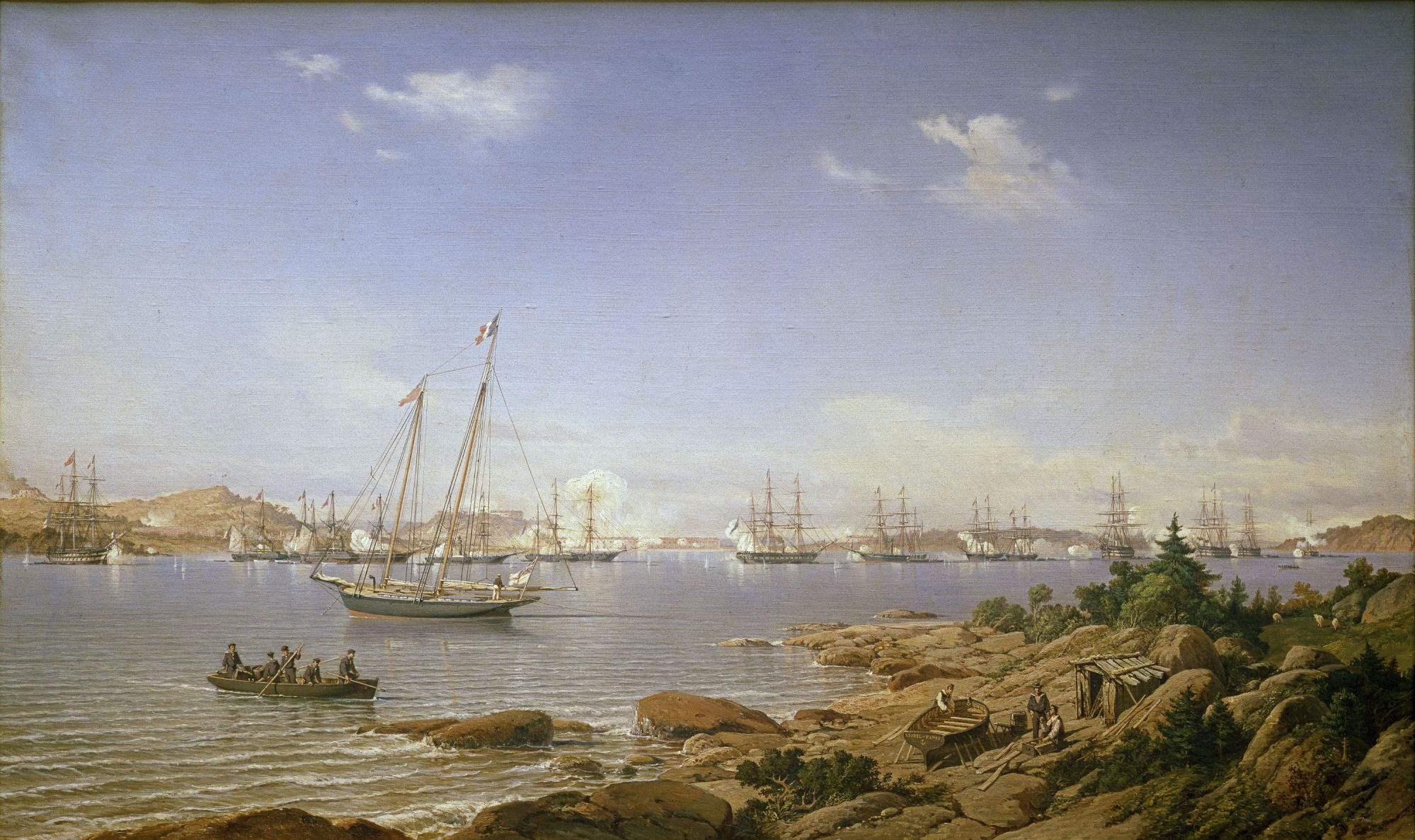
Bombardment of Bomarsund during the Crimean War, by Antoine Léon Morel-Fatio

The first hostile armed action of the two Western allies against Russia was the appearance of the British and French fleets in the Baltic Sea. However, the Allies understood the large number of Russian forces in this region to protect the capital. Therefore, the actions of the Anglo-French troops in this area were aimed at keeping the Russian command on alert and preventing the dispatch of troops to strengthen the defence of the southern part of the country. As a result, small-scale attacks and measures were carried out to disrupt Russian merchant shipping.

The Baltic was a forgotten theatre of the Crimean War. Popularisation of events elsewhere overshadowed the significance of this theatre, which was close to Saint Petersburg, the Russian capital. In April 1854, an Anglo-French fleet entered the Baltic to attack the Russian naval base of Kronstadt and the Russian fleet that was stationed there. In August 1854, the combined British and French fleet returned to Kronstadt for another attempt. The outnumbered Russian Baltic Fleet confined its movements to the areas around its fortifications. At the same time, the British and French commanders Sir Charles Napier and Alexandre Ferdinand Parseval-Deschenes although they led the largest fleet assembled since the Napoleonic Wars, considered the Sveaborg fortress too well-defended to engage. Thus, shelling of the Russian batteries was limited to two attempts in 1854 and 1855, and initially, the attacking fleets limited their actions to blockading Russian trade in the Gulf of Finland. Naval attacks on other ports, such as the ones in the island of Hogland in the Gulf of Finland, proved more successful. Additionally, allies conducted raids on less fortified sections of the Finnish coast. These battles are known in Finland as the Åland War.

Russia depended on imports—both for its domestic economy and for the supply of its military forces: the blockade forced Russia to rely on more expensive overland shipments from Prussia. The blockade seriously undermined the Russian export economy and helped shorten the war.

The burning of tar warehouses and ships led to international criticism, and in London the MP Thomas Milner Gibson demanded in the House of Commons that the First Lord of the Admiralty explain "a system which carried on a great war by plundering and destroying the property of defenceless villagers". In fact, the operations in the Baltic sea were in the nature of binding forces. It was very important to divert Russian forces from the south or, more precisely, not to allow Nicholas to transfer to Crimea a huge army guarding the Baltic coast and the capital. This goal Anglo-French forces achieved. The Russian Army in Crimea was forced to act without superiority in forces.

In August 1854 a Franco-British naval force captured and destroyed the Russian Bomarsund fortress on Åland Islands. In the August 1855, the Western Allied Baltic Fleet tried to destroy heavily defended Russian dockyards at Sveaborg outside Helsinki. More than 1,000 enemy guns tested the strength of the fortress for two days. Despite the shelling, the sailors of the 120-gun ship Rossiya, led by Captain Viktor Poplonsky, defended the entrance to the harbour. The Allies fired over 20,000 shells but failed to defeat the Russian batteries. The British then built a massive new fleet of more than 350 gunboats and mortar vessels, which was known as the Great Armament, but the war ended before the attack was launched.

Part of the Russian resistance was credited to the deployment of newly invented naval mines. Perhaps the most influential contributor to the development of naval mining was a Swede resident in Russia, the inventor and civil engineer Immanuel Nobel (the father of Alfred Nobel). Immanuel Nobel helped the Russian war effort by applying his knowledge of industrial explosives, such as nitroglycerin and gunpowder. An account given in 1860 by United States Army Major Richard Delafield dates modern naval mining to the Crimean War: "Torpedo mines, if I may use this name given by Fulton to 'self-acting mines underwater', were among the novelties attempted by the Russians in their defences about Cronstadt and Sevastopol."

For the campaign of 1856, Britain and France planned an attack on the main base of the Russian Navy in the Baltic sea—Kronstadt. The attack was to be carried out using armoured floating batteries. The use of the latter proved to be highly effective in the attack on Kinburn on the Black Sea in 1855. Undoubtedly, this threat contributed on the part of Russia the decision on the conclusion of peace on unfavourable terms.

=== White Sea theatre ===
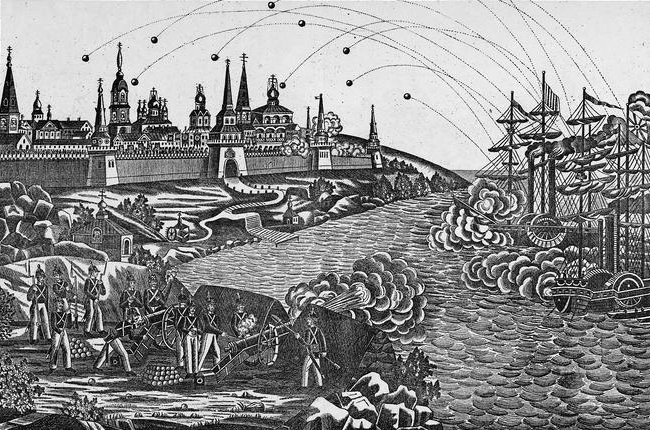
"Bombardment of the Solovetsky Monastery in the White Sea by the Royal Navy", a lubok (popular print) from 1868

Initial British and subsequent Allied reconnaissance efforts all led to the unanimous conclusion that Archangel could not be successfully attacked because it could not even be reached by Allied warships. In June 1854, a squadron of three British warships led by HMS Miranda left the Baltic for the White Sea. An attempt to find a deep-water fairway for the approach to Arkhangel was thwarted by Russian artillery fire. "Ommanney and the two ships that accompanied him to the Solovetsky Islands were clearly surprised by the monastery’s unexpected resistance". An ultimatum was presented on the surrender of the fortress, it was rejected. On 19 July 1854, artillery fire was conducted on the monastery for 6.5 hours. Hundreds of shots were fired. The fortress also responded with artillery fire. "Shot fell harmless on the massive outwork which encloses the Monastery". Concluding that there was nothing more to be done, Ommanney and his squadron left the anchorage soon.

Russia's other northern centres, however, were not as fortunate. On 20 August 1854, British ships approached the town of Kola. "In a scene repeated countless times over the next two years, a British ship’s boat (...) approached the shore and, submitted conditional terms for the surrender of the Garrison". And after "red hot shot and explosive shells quickly and predictably combined with a “fresh breeze" to make Kola "burn furiously", ill-armed garrison of 50 retired soldiers, assisted by civilian volunteers, had no hope of defending the densely concentrated and irregularly spaced wooden houses, which were reduced "to ashes" during a daylong bombardment. Britain and France severely curtailed both local and international maritime trade throughout the region. "British and French sources recounted learning from Russian ones, including Anton Pofkoff (or Pafkoff) of Kandalaksha, that the White Sea Districts and Kola were so ill-supplied that renewing a blockade in 1856 would probably result in these areas being “entirely deserted" by their inhabitants.

=== Pacific theatre ===
Minor naval skirmishes also occurred in the Far East, where at Petropavlovsk on the Kamchatka Peninsula a British and French Allied squadron including HMS Pique under Rear Admiral David Price and a French force under Counter-Admiral Auguste Febvrier Despointes besieged a smaller Russian force under Rear Admiral Yevfimiy Putyatin. In September 1854, an Allied landing force was beaten back with heavy casualties, and the Allies withdrew. The victory at Petropavlovsk was for Russia in the words of the future Minister of War Dmitry Milyutin "a ray of light among the dark clouds". "The French emperor was displeased. The emperor and his ministers were used to suffering losses (even more severe) in this war, but they were not used to defeat". The following year, the Anglo-French fleet approached Petropavlovsk again, this time with twice the number of ships. The Russians escaped under the cover of snow in early 1855 after Allied reinforcements arrived in the region.

The Anglo-French forces in the Far East also made several small landings on Sakhalin and Urup, one of the Kuril Islands.

=== Piedmontese involvement ===
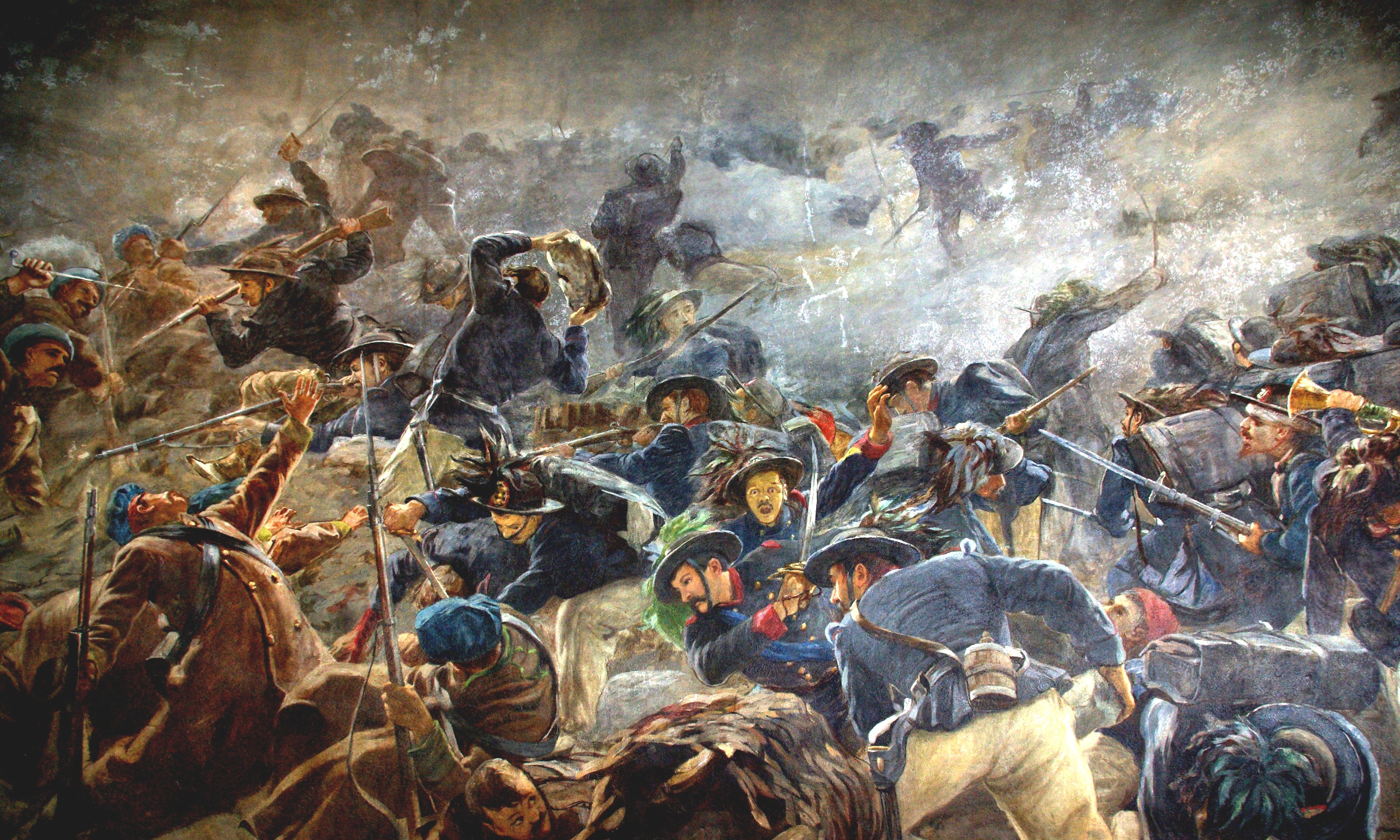
The Italian Bersaglieri halt the Russian attack during the Battle of the Chernaya.

Camillo di Cavour, under orders of Victor Emmanuel II of Piedmont-Sardinia, sent an expeditionary corps of 15,000 soldiers, commanded by General Alfonso La Marmora, to side with French and British forces during the war. This was an attempt at gaining the favour of the French, especially when the issue of uniting Italy would become an important matter. The deployment of Italian troops to Crimea, and the gallantry shown by them in the Battle of the Chernaya (16 August 1855) and in the Siege of Sevastopol, allowed the Kingdom of Sardinia to be among the participants at the peace conference at the end of the war, where it could address the issue of the Risorgimento to other European powers.

=== Greece ===
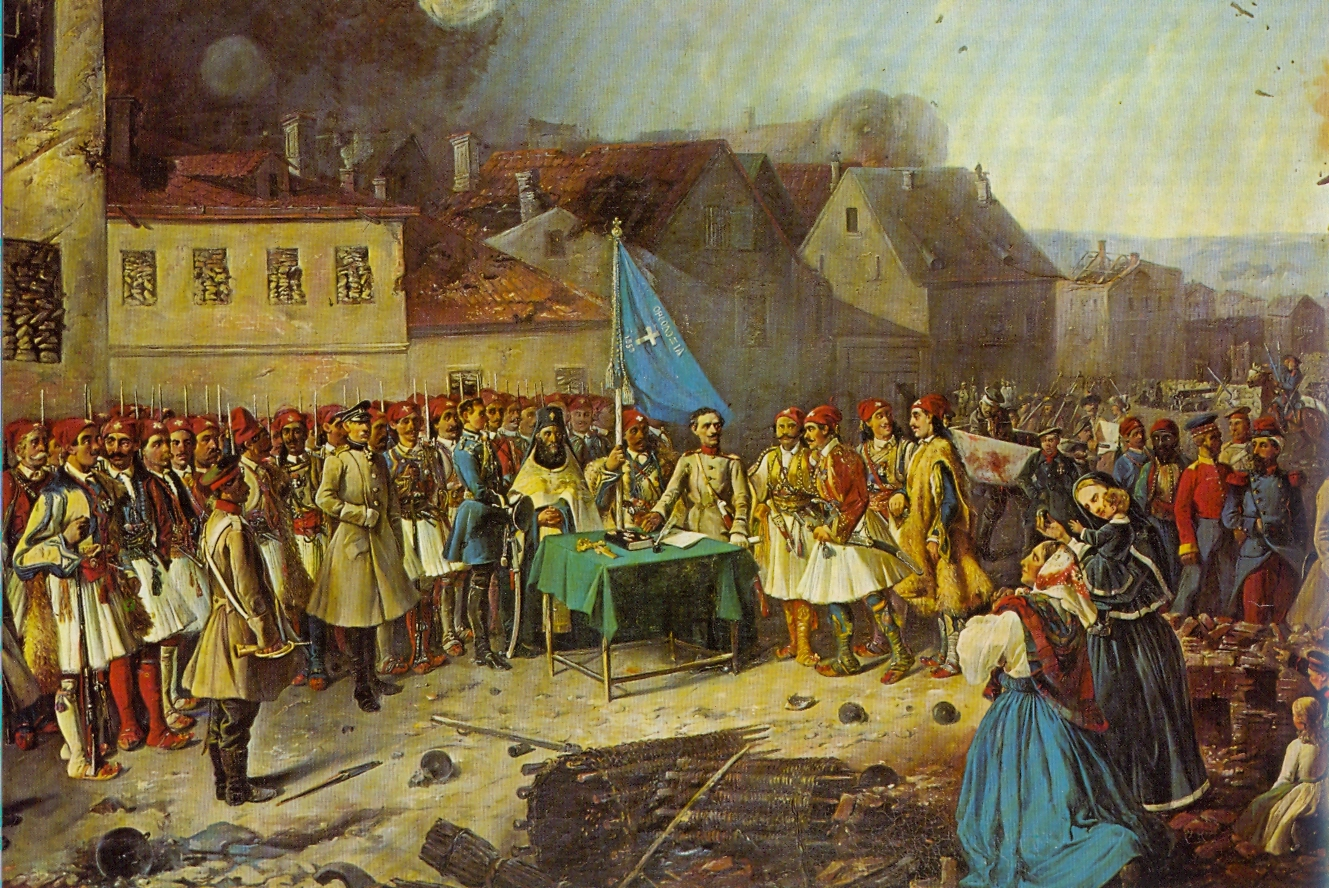
A Greek legion fought for Russia at Sevastopol

Greece played a peripheral role in the war. When Russia attacked the Ottoman Empire in 1853, King Otto of Greece saw an opportunity to expand north and south into Ottoman areas that had large Greek Christian majorities. Greece did not coordinate its plans with Russia, did not declare war, and received no outside military or financial support. Greece, an Orthodox nation, had considerable support in Russia, but the Russian government decided it was too dangerous to help Greece expand its holdings. When the Russians invaded the Principalities, the Ottoman forces were tied down so Greece invaded Thessaly and Epirus. To block further Greek moves, the British and French occupied the main Greek port at Piraeus from April 1854 to February 1857, and effectively neutralised the Greek Army. The Greeks, gambling on a Russian victory, incited the large-scale Epirus Revolt of 1854 as well as uprisings in Ottoman Crete. The insurrections were failures that were easily crushed by the Ottomans' allied Egyptian Army. Greece was not invited to the peace conference and made no gains out of the war. The frustrated Greek leadership blamed the King for failing to take advantage of the situation; his popularity plunged and he was forced to abdicate in 1862.

In addition, a 1,000-strong Greek Volunteer Legion was formed in the Danubian Principalities in 1854 and later fought at Sevastopol.

=== Kiev Cossack revolt ===
A peasant revolt that began in the Vasylkiv county of Kiev Governorate (province) in February 1855 spread across the whole Kiev and Chernigov Governorates, with peasants refusing to participate in corvée labour and other orders of the local authorities and, in some cases, attacking priests who were accused of hiding a decree about the liberation of the peasants.

== End of the war ==
=== British position ===
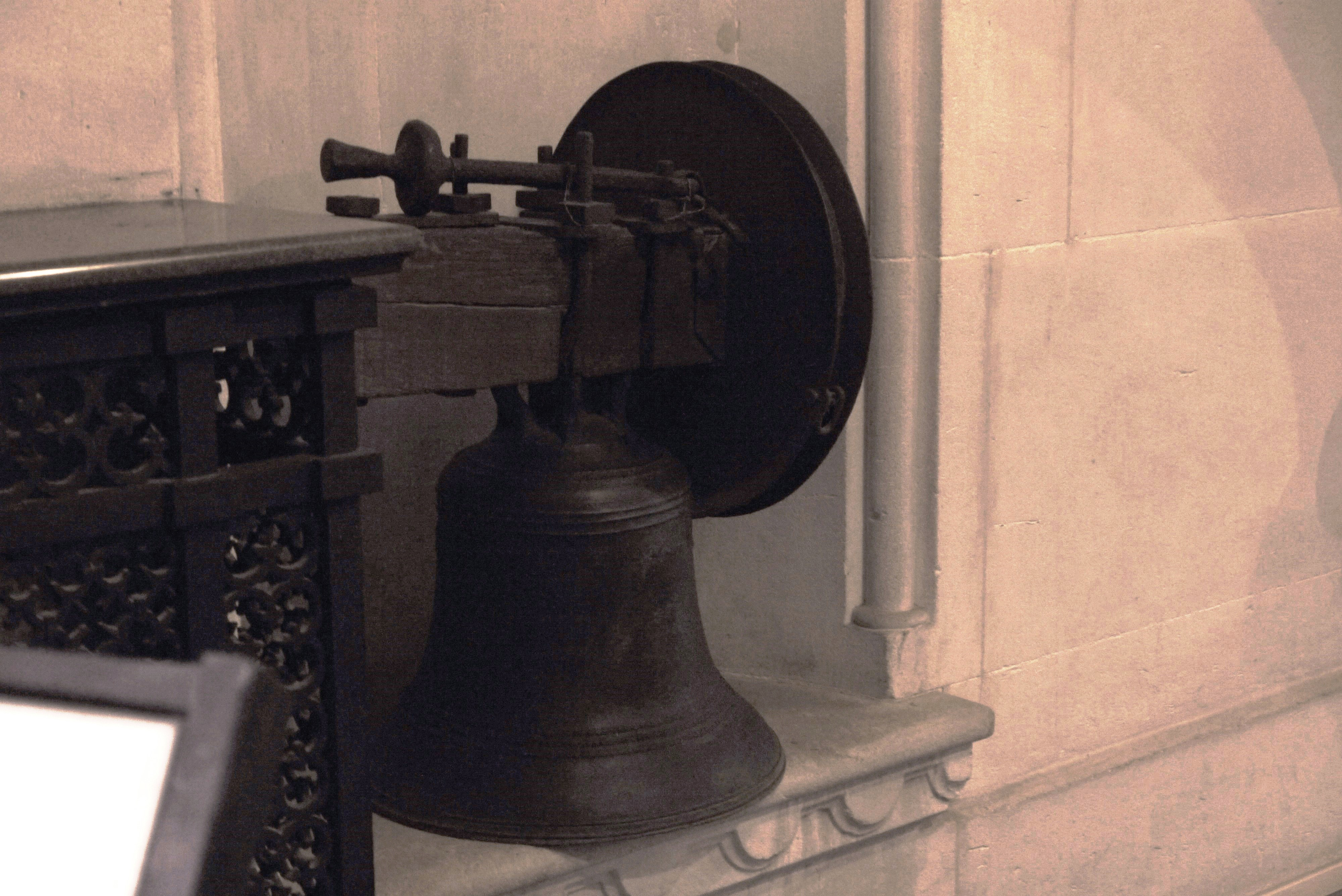
One of three 17th-century church bells in Arundel Castle, England, which were taken from Sevastopol as trophies at the end of the Crimean War

Dissatisfaction with the conduct of the war was growing with the public in Britain and other countries and was worsened by reports of fiascos, especially the devastating losses of the Charge of the Light Brigade at the Battle of Balaclava. On Sunday, 21 January 1855, a "snowball riot" occurred in Trafalgar Square near St Martin-in-the-Fields in which 1,500 people gathered to protest against the war by pelting cabs and pedestrians with snowballs. When the police intervened, the snowballs were directed at the constables. The riot was finally put down by troops and police acting with truncheons. In Parliament, the Conservatives demanded an accounting of all soldiers, cavalry and sailors sent to Crimea and accurate figures as to the number of casualties sustained by all British armed forces in Crimea, especially concerning the Battle of Balaclava. When Parliament passed a bill to investigate by the vote of 305 to 148, Aberdeen said he had lost a vote of no confidence and resigned as prime minister on 30 January 1855. The veteran former Foreign Secretary Lord Palmerston became prime minister. Palmerston took a hard line and wanted to expand the war, foment unrest inside the Russian Empire and reduce the Russian threat to Europe permanently. Sweden–Norway and Prussia were willing to join Britain and France, and Russia was isolated.

=== Peace negotiations ===
France, which had sent far more soldiers to the war and suffered far more casualties than Britain had, wanted the war to end, as did Austria.

Negotiations began in Paris in February 1856 and were surprisingly easy. France, under the leadership of Napoleon III, had no special interests in the Black Sea and so did not support the harsh British and Austrian proposals.

Peace negotiations at the Congress of Paris resulted in the signing of the Treaty of Paris on 30 March 1856. In compliance with Article III, Russia restored to the Ottoman Empire the city and the citadel of Kars and "all other parts of the Ottoman territory of which the Russian troop were in possession". Russia returned the Southern Bessarabia to Moldavia. By Article IV, Britain, France, Sardinia and Ottoman Empire restored to Russia "the towns and ports of Sevastopol, Balaklava, Kamish, Eupatoria, Kerch, Jenikale, Kinburn as well as all other territories occupied by the allied troops". In conformity with Articles XI and XIII, the Tsar and the Sultan agreed not to establish any naval or military arsenal on the Black Sea coast. The Black Sea clauses weakened Russia, which no longer posed a naval threat to the Ottomans. The Principalities of Moldavia and Wallachia were nominally returned to the Ottoman Empire, and the Austrian Empire was forced to abandon its annexation and to end its occupation of them, but they in practice became independent. The Treaty of Paris admitted the Ottoman Empire to the Concert of Europe, and the great powers pledged to respect its independence and territorial integrity.

=== Aftermath in Russia ===
Some members of the Russian intelligentsia saw defeat as a pressure to modernise their society. Grand Duke Constantine, a son of the Tsar, remarked:

We cannot deceive ourselves any longer; we must say that we are both weaker and poorer than the first-class powers, and furthermore poorer not only in material terms but in mental resources, especially in matters of administration.

== Long-term effects ==
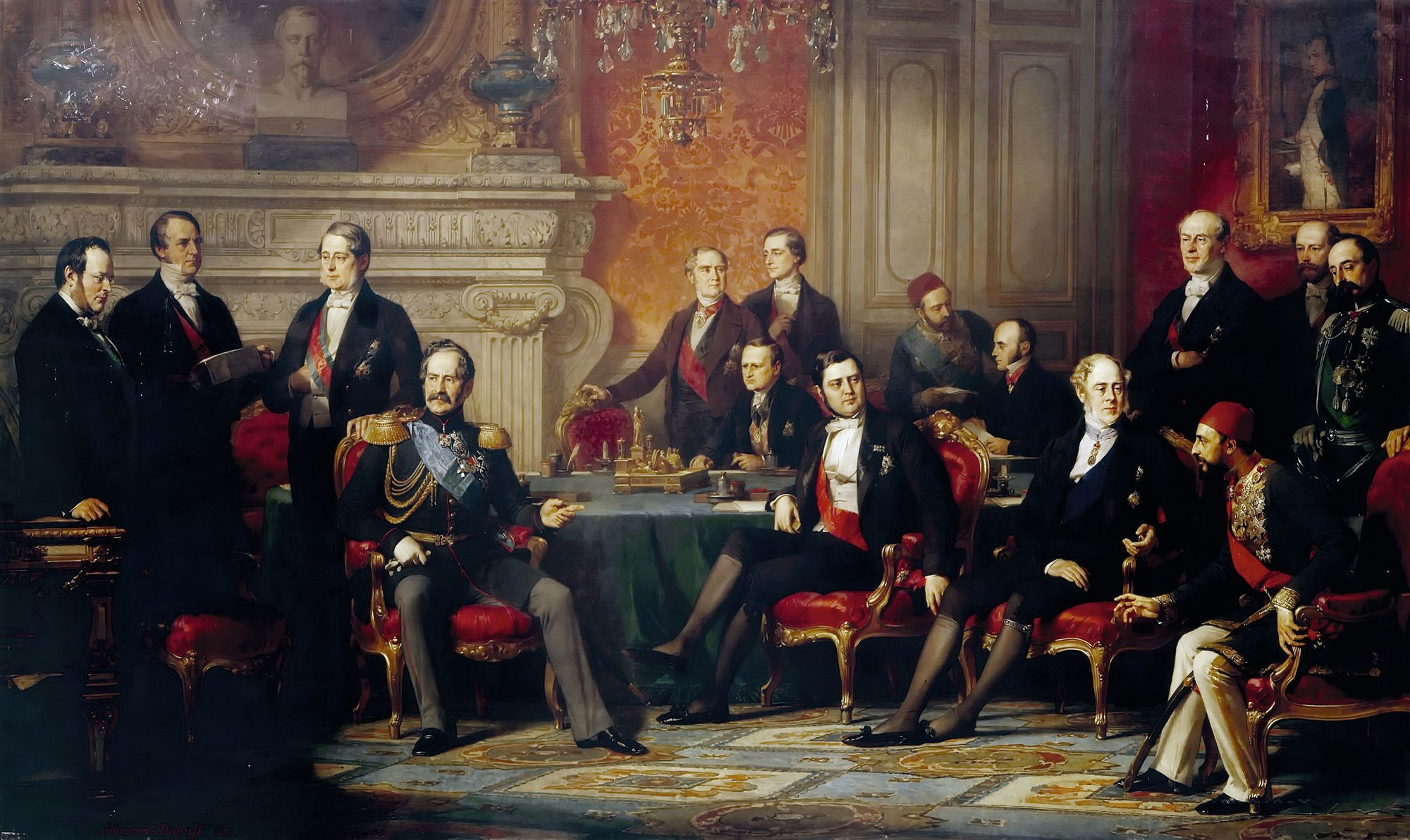
The Congress of Paris by Edouard Dubufe. The Treaty of Paris brought an end to the war.

Orlando Figes points to the long-term damage Russia suffered: "The demilitarization of the Black Sea was a major blow to Russia, which was no longer able to protect its vulnerable southern coastal frontier against the British or any other fleet... The destruction of the Russian Black Sea Fleet, Sevastopol and other naval docks was a humiliation. No compulsory disarmament had ever been imposed on a great power previously... The Allies did not really think that they were dealing with a European power in Russia. They regarded Russia as a semi-Asiatic state... In Russia itself, the Crimean defeat discredited the armed services and highlighted the need to modernize the country's defences, not just in the strictly military sense, but also through the building of railways, industrialization, sound finances and so on... The image many Russians had built up of their country—the biggest, richest and most powerful in the world—had suddenly been shattered. Russia's backwardness had been exposed... The Crimean disaster had exposed the shortcomings of every institution in Russia—not just the corruption and incompetence of the military command, the technological backwardness of the army and navy, or the inadequate roads and lack of railways that accounted for the chronic problems of supply, but the poor condition and illiteracy of the serfs who made up the armed forces, the inability of the serf economy to sustain a state of war against industrial powers, and the failures of autocracy itself."

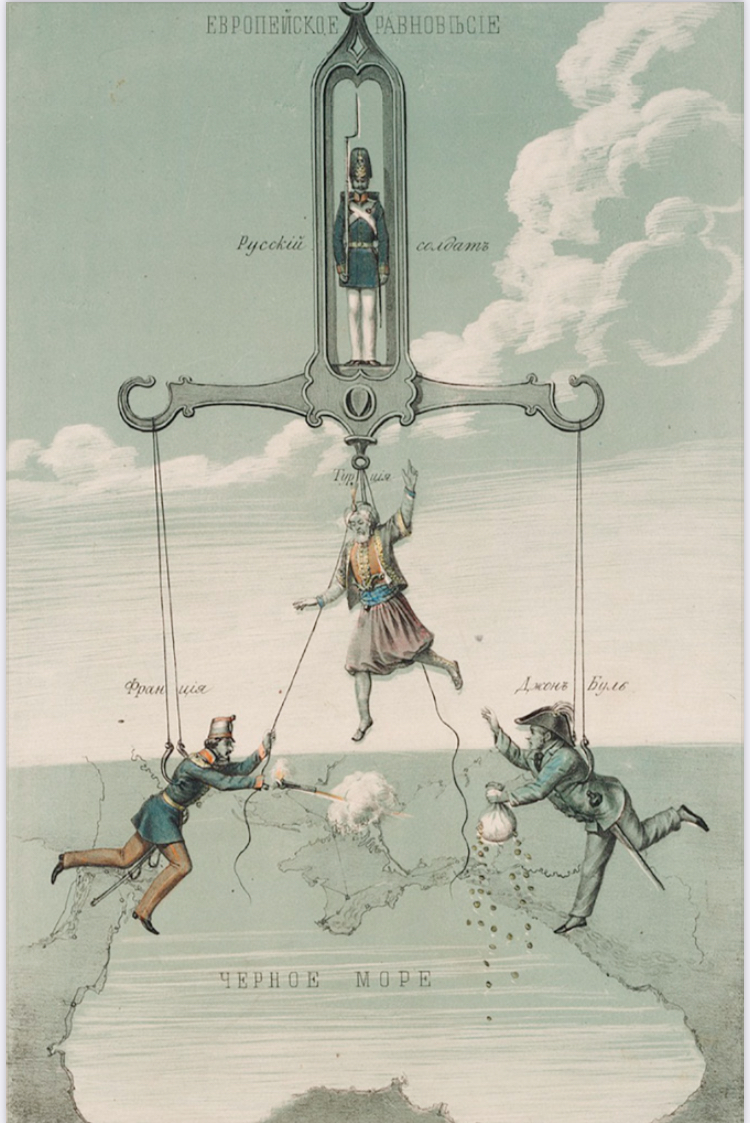
The New European Balance in Europe, Russian propaganda poster c. 1855

Surprisingly, after the war, a Russian-French rapprochement came, which corresponded to the plans of both sides. France persuaded the Russians to support their claims to return to the territories before the Congress of Vienna, in exchange for ceasing to act as a guarantor of the Paris peace. Alexander II stated in response to his minister's remark: "It would undoubtedly be more useful for our interests to have him among our allies if we could rely on him."

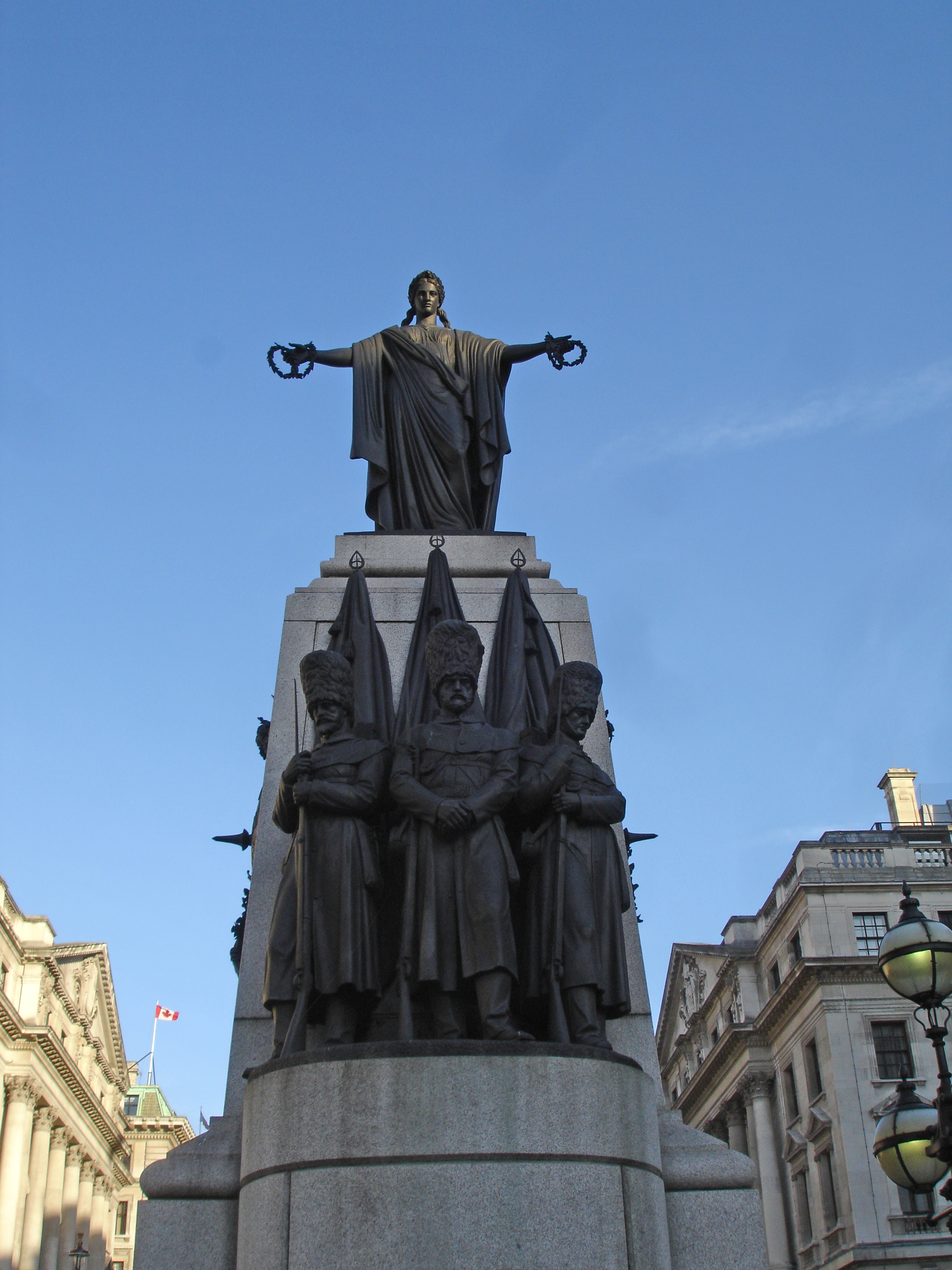
Crimean War Memorial at Waterloo Place, St James's, London

The Treaty of Paris stood until 1871, when Prussia defeated France in the Franco-Prussian War of 1870–71. While Prussia and several other German states united to form a powerful German Empire in January 1871, the French had deposed Napoleon III and proclaimed the Third Republic the previous September. During his reign, Napoleon, eager for the support of the United Kingdom, had opposed Russia over the Eastern Question. Russian interference in the Ottoman Empire did not in any significant manner threaten the interests of France (Kissinger uses Napoleon's pandering to journalists and public opinion on this subject—at the expense of the true interests of France—as an example of strategic frivolity), and France abandoned its opposition to Russia after the establishment of the republic. Encouraged by the new attitude of French diplomacy after the surrenders of the besieged French Army at Sedan and later Metz and supported by the German chancellor Otto von Bismarck, Russia in October 1870 renounced the Black Sea clauses of the treaty agreed to in 1856, signing the Treaty of London in 1871. As the United Kingdom with Austria-Hungary could not enforce the clauses, Russia once again established a fleet in the Black Sea.

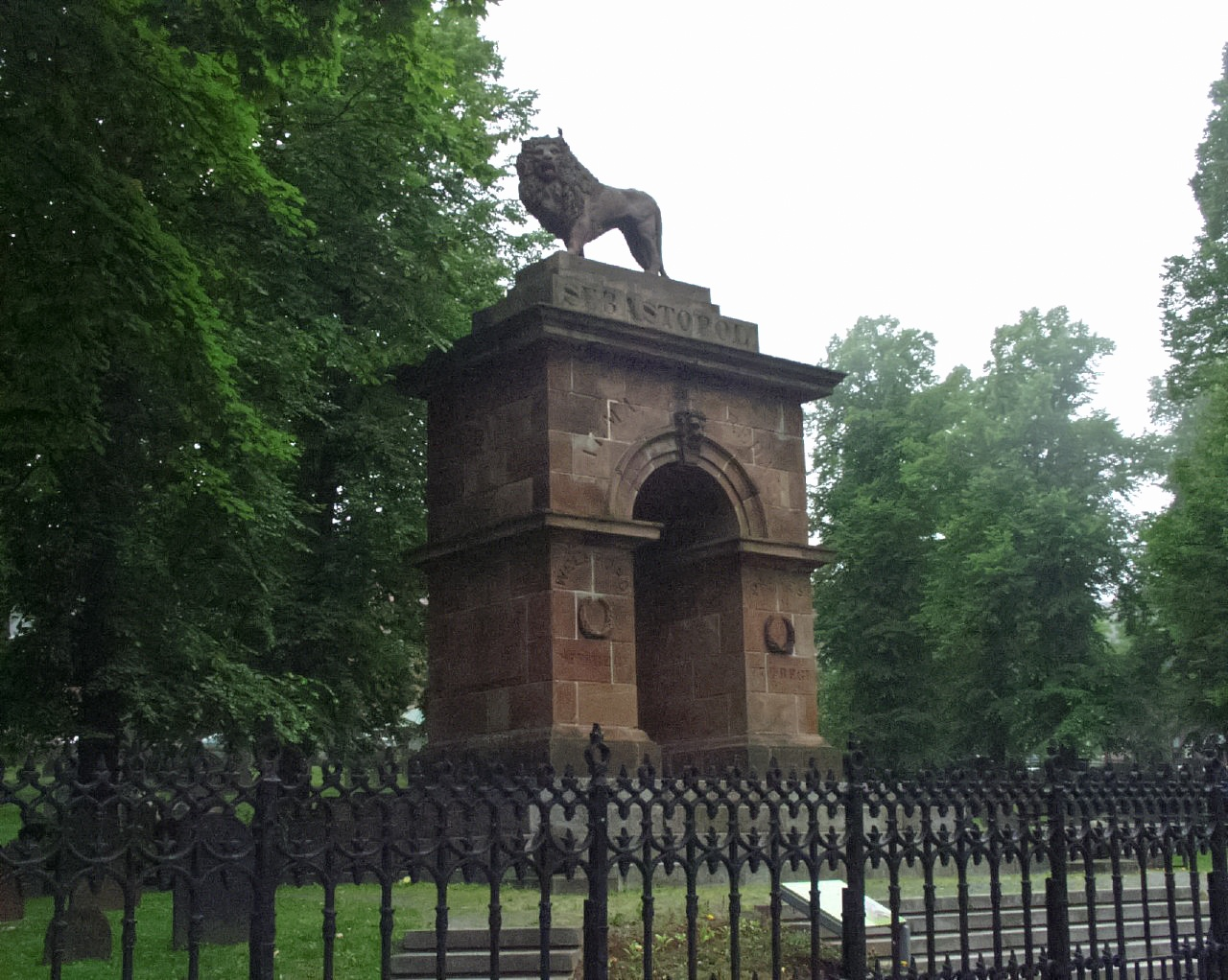
Sebastopol Monument, Halifax, Nova Scotia – the only Crimean War Monument in North America

After being defeated in the Crimean War, Russia feared that its Alaskan territory would be easily captured in any future war with the British; therefore, Alexander II opted to sell the territory to the United States.

A Greek tortoise named Timothy was found on a Portuguese ship by Captain John Guy Courtenay-Everard on HMS Queen in 1854. Serving as a mascot throughout the war, when she died in 2004 this made her the last living veteran of the Crimean war.

Historian Norman Rich argues that the war was not an accident, but was sought out by the determination of the British and French not to allow Russia an honourable retreat. Both insisted on a military victory to enhance their prestige in European affairs when a non-violent peaceful political solution was available. The war then wrecked the Concert of Europe, which had long kept the peace.

Turkish historian Candan Badem wrote, "Victory in this war did not bring any significant material gain, not even a war indemnity. On the other hand, the Ottoman treasury was nearly bankrupted due to war expenses". Badem adds that the Ottomans achieved no significant territorial gains, lost the right to a navy in the Black Sea, and failed to gain status as a great power. Further, the war gave impetus to the union of the Danubian principalities and ultimately to their independence.

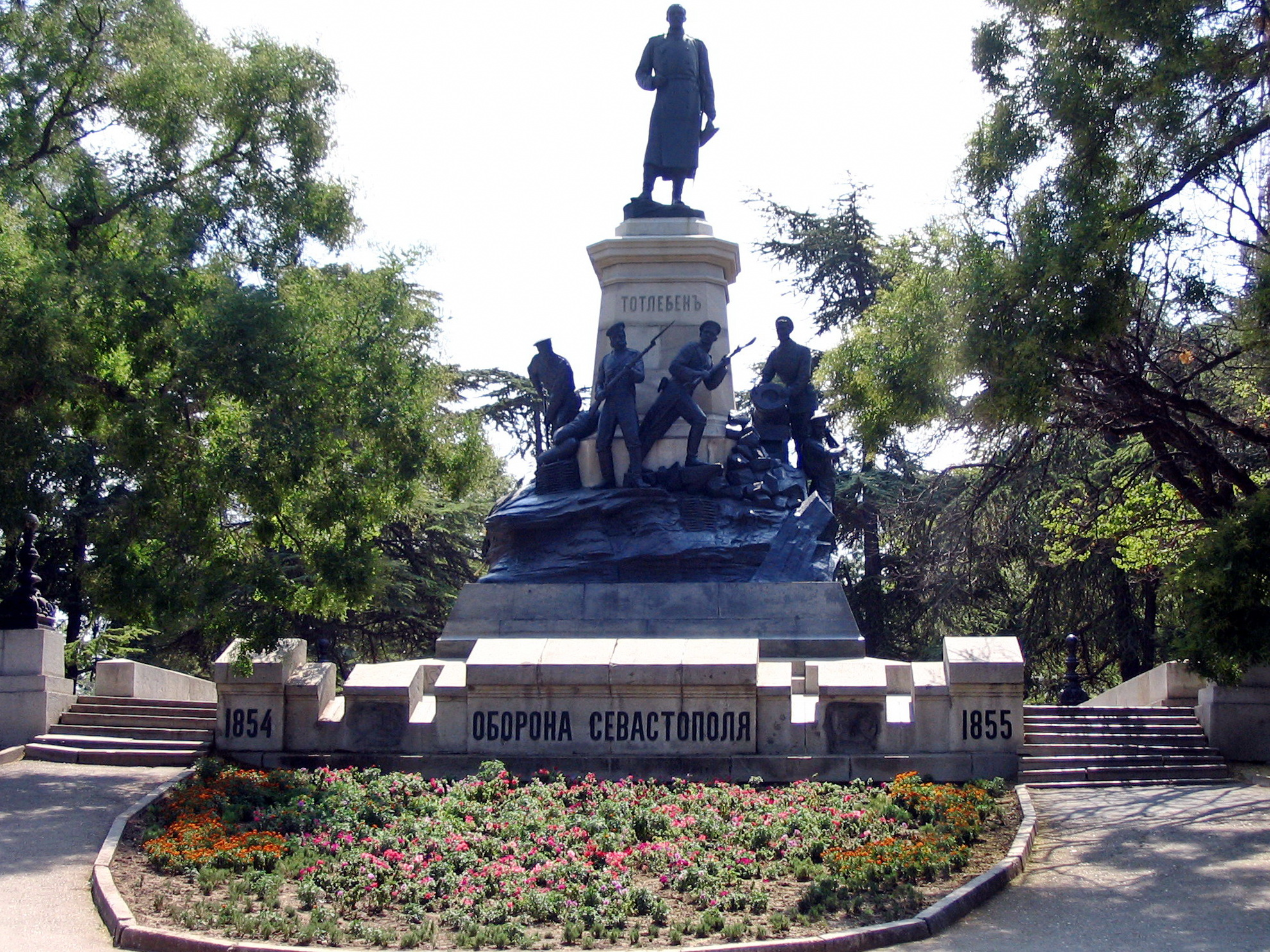
Monument to the Baltic German military engineer and general of the Imperial Russian Army Eduard Totleben in Sevastopol, Crimea

The treaty punished the defeated Russia, but in the long run, Austria lost the most from the war despite having barely taken part in it. Having abandoned its alliance with Russia, Austria remained diplomatically isolated following the war, which contributed to its disastrous defeats in the 1859 Franco-Austrian War that resulted in the cession of Lombardy to the Kingdom of Sardinia and later in the loss of the Habsburg rule of Tuscany and Modena, which meant the end of Austrian influence in peninsular Italy. Furthermore, Russia did not do anything to assist its former ally, Austria, in the 1866 Austro-Prussian War, when Austria lost Venetia and, more importantly, its influence in most German-speaking lands. The status of Austria as a great power, with the unifications of Germany and Italy, now became very precarious. It had to compromise with Hungary; the two countries shared the Danubian Empire. With France now hostile to Germany and gravitating towards Russia, and with Russia competing with the newly renamed Austro-Hungarian Empire for an increased role in the Balkans at the expense of the Ottoman Empire, the foundations were in place for building the diplomatic alliances that would shape the First World War.

The Treaty's guarantees to preserve Ottoman territories were broken 21 years later when Russia, exploiting nationalist unrest in the Balkans and seeking to regain lost prestige, once again declared war on the Ottoman Empire on 24 April 1877. In this later Russo-Turkish War the states of Romania, Serbia, and Montenegro gained international recognition of their independence and Bulgaria achieved its autonomy from direct Ottoman rule. Russia took over Southern Bessarabia, lost in 1856. The regions of Batum and Kars, as well as those inhabited by Adjarians (Muslim Georgians) and Armenians, were also annexed to Russia in the Caucasus. At the same time, "protectors" of the Ottoman Empire Britain received Cyprus as a colonial possession, while Austria-Hungary occupied and annexed Bosnia and Herzegovina in 1908. Finally, Ottoman rule in the Balkans ended after the First Balkan War of 1912, when the combined forces of the Balkan states defeated it.

The Crimean War marked the re-ascendancy of France to the position of pre-eminent power on the Continent, the continued decline of the Ottoman Empire and a period of crisis for Imperial Russia. As Fuller notes, "Russia had been beaten on the Crimean Peninsula, and the military feared that it would inevitably be beaten again unless steps were taken to surmount its military weakness." To compensate for its defeat in the Crimean War, the Russian Empire then embarked in more intensive expansion in Asia, partially to restore national pride and partially to distract Britain on the world stage, intensifying the Great Game.

The war also marked the demise of the first phase of the Concert of Europe, the balance-of-power system that had dominated Europe since the Congress of Vienna in 1815 and had included France, Russia, Prussia, Austria and the United Kingdom. From 1854 to 1871, the Concert of Europe concept was weakened, leading to the crises that were the unifications of Germany and of Italy, before a resurgence of great power conferences.

In 1870, Prussia persuaded Russia to remain neutral in the Franco-Prussian war. Bismarck, having declared it impossible to keep 100 million Russians in a humiliated position without sovereign rights to their Black Sea coastline, supported Russia against the Treaty of Paris, and in return, Prussia achieved freedom of action against France in 1870–71 and inflicted a crushing defeat on it.

Azimullah Khan, an Indian who visited the war front after arriving at Constantinople following a failed mission in England, has been claimed by several writers to have inspired the outbreak of the Indian Rebellion of 1857. According to Vinayak Damodar Savarkar in his book The Indian War of Independence (c. 1909) and several other writers, Khan observed the poor quality of the British troops in Crimea and viewed this as a sign that Britain would not able to resist a revolt against Company rule in India. However, the academic Francis Jarman argues that such claims are exaggerated and Khan played only a minor role in the instigation of the rebellion.

=== Debt ===
The Crimean War marked the beginning of a prolonged period of debt dependence for the Ottoman Empire. In 1854 and 1855 the Ottoman government contracted its first large foreign loans—£3 million from Dent, Palmer & Co. and £5 million from the London Rothschilds—at interest rates of 6 per cent and 4 per cent respectively, secured by the revenues from Egyptian taxes. Although these loans were considered relatively inexpensive and successfully financed the war effort, they established a precedent for external borrowing on European markets. During the following two decades, the Empire increasingly relied on foreign credit to cover budget deficits and to service earlier debts. By the 1870s, interest payments consumed a major share of state revenues, culminating in the suspension of payments in 1875 and the creation of the Ottoman Public Debt Administration in 1881. The financial legacy of the Crimean War thus extended far beyond the battlefield, entangling the Ottoman state in a cycle of dependency that limited its fiscal sovereignty for the remainder of its existence. The last of the Ottoman public debts were repaid by the Republic of Turkey in 1954, a full century after the first wartime loans were contracted.

=== Historical analysis ===
According to historian Shepard Clough, the war

was not the result of a calculated plan, nor even of hasty last-minute decisions made under stress. It was the consequence of more than two years of fatal blundering in slow-motion by inept statesmen who had months to reflect upon the actions they took. It arose from Napoleon's search for prestige; Nicholas's quest for control over the Straits; his naïve miscalculation of the probable reactions of the European powers; the failure of those powers to make their positions clear; and the pressure of public opinion in Britain and Constantinople at crucial moments.

The view of "diplomatic drift" as the cause of the war was first popularised by A. W. Kinglake, who portrayed the British as victims of newspaper sensationalism and duplicitous French and Ottoman diplomacy.

More recently, historians Andrew Lambert and Winfried Baumgart have argued that Britain was following a geopolitical strategy in aiming to destroy the fledgling Russian Navy, which might challenge the Royal Navy for control of the seas, and that the war was also a joint European response to a century of Russian expansion not just southwards but also into Western Europe.

=== Casualties ===
The war undoubtedly became one of the bloodiest in the history of Europe at that time, but data on casualties vary greatly. The European states, Russia, France and Britain suffered the greatest losses. Sources agree on the definition of the losses of the last two, these are 95,615 dead on the part of France, 22,182 on the part of Britain and 2,166 dead Italians, Turkish losses range from 45,400 dead to 400,000. Estimates on the number of Russian soldiers who died in the war vary from 450,000 to 630,000, the vast majority to disease (by one calculation, only 1 out of every 6 Russian deaths was due to combat). Specifically in the Crimean campaign of 1854–1856, 113,529 Russian military deaths were documented (40,551 in combat, 88,798 to disease and accidents) and 81,247 men were wounded. Historian Yevgeny Tarle described the war as a "bloody massacre".

== Documentation ==
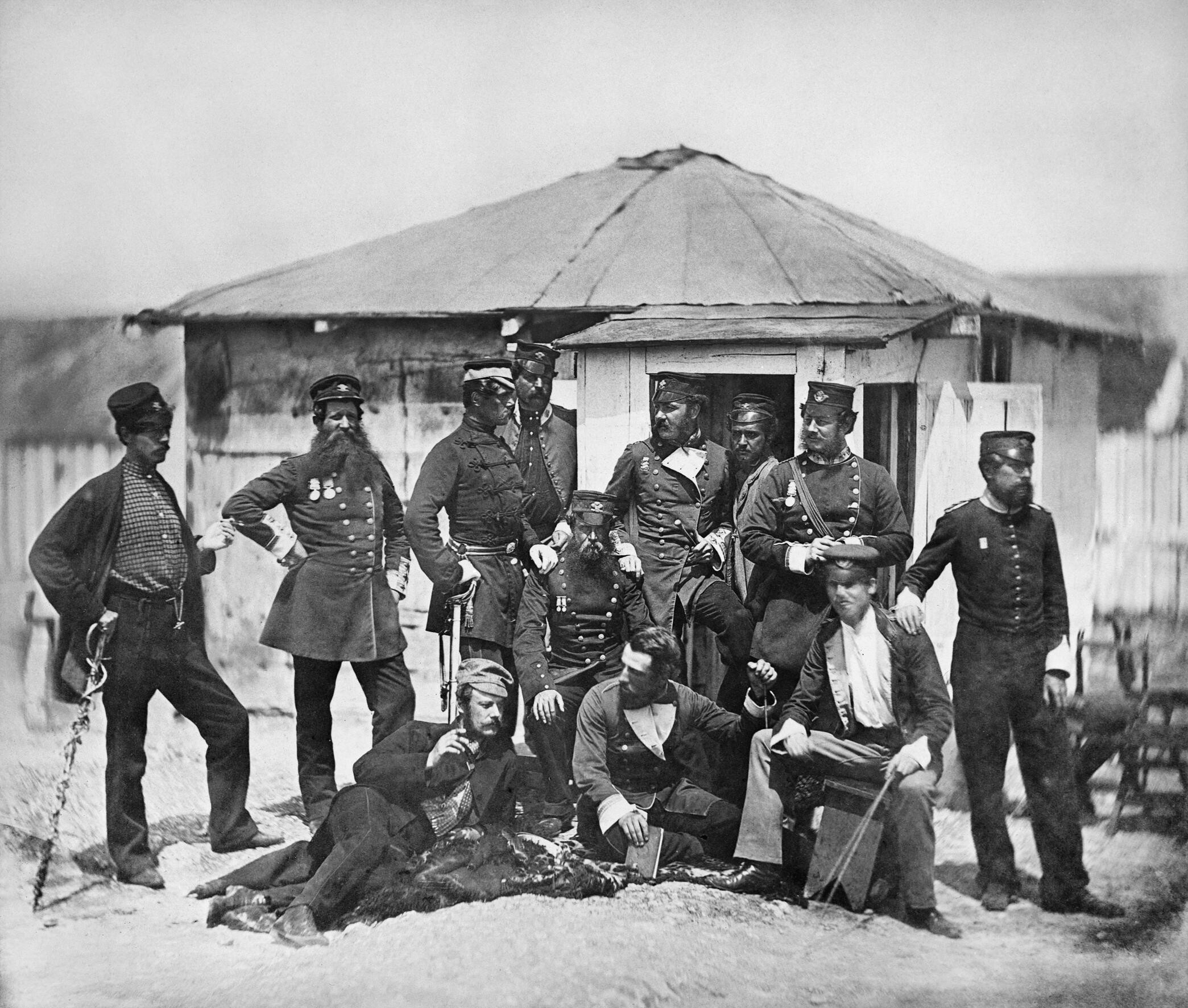
Officers of the 41st Foot on 5 November 1854, photograph by James Robertson

Documentation of the war was provided by William Howard Russell, who wrote for The Times newspaper, and by Roger Fenton's photographs. News from war correspondents reached all of the nations involved in the war and kept the public citizenry of those nations better informed of the day-to-day events of the war than had been the case in any earlier war. The British public was very well informed on the day-to-day realities of the war. After the French extended the telegraph to the coast of the Black Sea in late 1854, news reached London in two days. When the British laid an underwater cable to Crimea in April 1855, news reached London in a few hours. The daily news reports energised public opinion, which brought down the Aberdeen government and carried Lord Palmerston into office as prime minister. Leo Tolstoy wrote a few short sketches on the Siege of Sevastopol, collected in Sevastopol Sketches. The stories detail the lives of the Russian soldiers and citizens in Sevastopol during the siege. Because of this work, Russell and Tolstoy have each been called the world's first war correspondent.

== Criticisms and reform ==
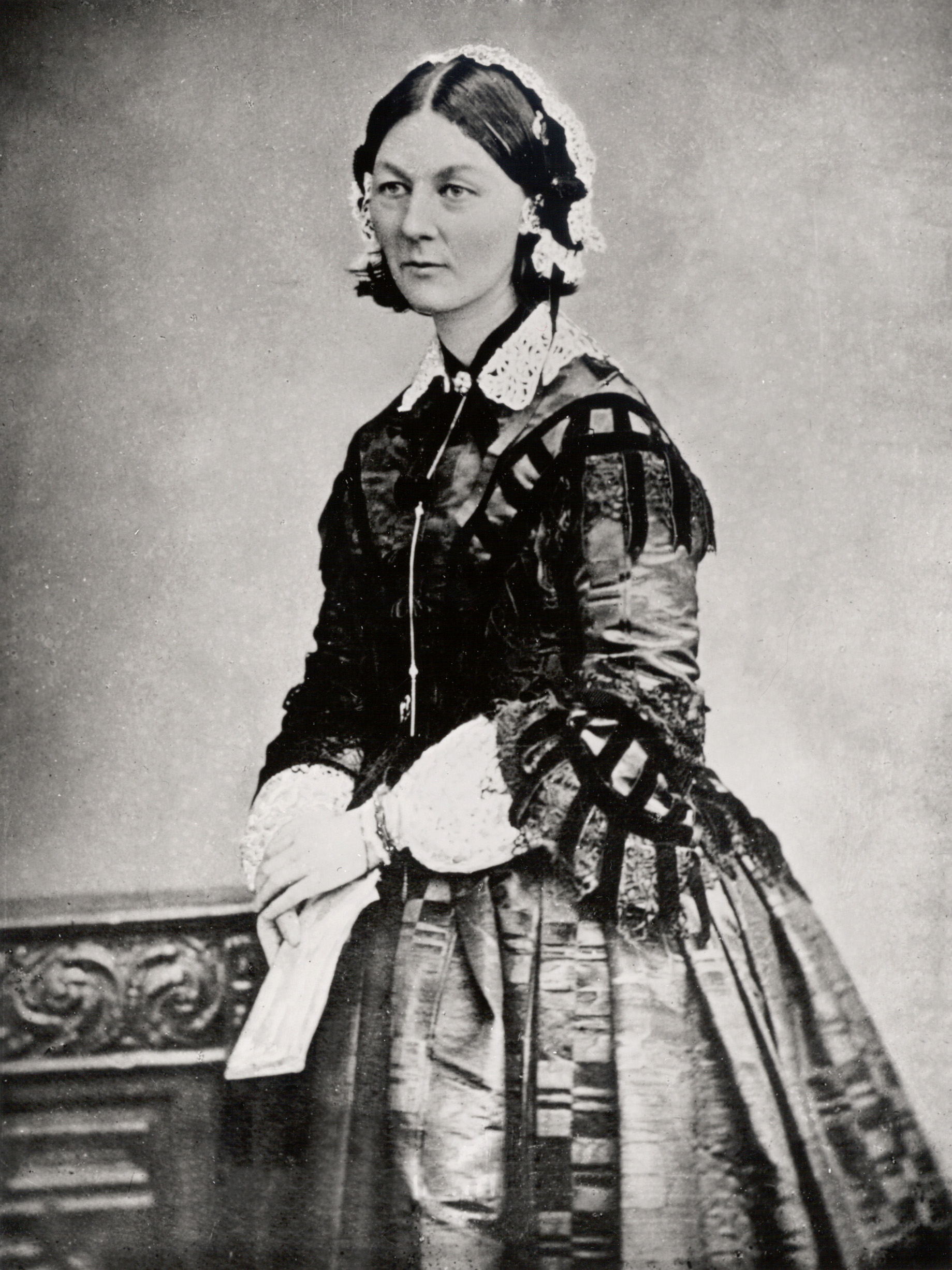
During the Crimean War, Florence Nightingale and her team of nurses used new statistical approaches to raise awareness, clean up the military hospitals and set up the first training school for nurses in the United Kingdom.

Historian R. B. McCallum points out the war was enthusiastically supported by the British populace as it was happening, but the mood changed very dramatically afterwards. Pacifists and critics were unpopular but:

in the end they won. Cobden and Bright were true to their principles of foreign policy, which laid down the absolute minimum of intervention in European affairs and a deep moral reprobation of war... When the first enthusiasm was passed, when the dead were mourned, the sufferings revealed, and the cost counted, when in 1870 Russia was able calmly to secure the revocation of the Treaty, which disarmed her in the Black Sea, the view became general of the war was stupid and unnecessary, and effected nothing... The Crimean war remained as a classic example... of how governments may plunge into war, how strong ambassadors may mislead weak prime ministers, how the public may be worked up into a facile fury, and how the achievements of the war may crumble to nothing. The Bright-Cobden criticism of the war was remembered and to a large extent accepted [especially by the Liberal Party]. Isolation from European entanglements seemed more than ever desirable.

As the memory of the "Charge of the Light Brigade" demonstrates, the war became an iconic symbol of logistical, medical and tactical failures and mismanagement. Public opinion in Britain was outraged at the logistical and command failures of the war; the newspapers demanded drastic reforms, and parliamentary investigations demonstrated the multiple failures of the army. The reform campaign was not well organised, and the traditional aristocratic leadership of the army pulled itself together, and blocked all serious reforms. No one was punished. The outbreak of the Indian Rebellion of 1857 shifted attention to the heroic defence of British interest by the army, and further talk of reform went nowhere.

The demand for professionalisation was achieved by Florence Nightingale, who gained worldwide attention for pioneering and publicising modern nursing while treating the wounded. Another nurse, a Jamaican named Mary Seacole, also made an impact providing care for wounded and dying soldiers. The Times war correspondent William Howard Russell spoke highly of Seacole's skill as a healer, writing "A more tender or skilful hand about a wound or a broken limb could not be found among our best surgeons."

Outstanding achievements in battlefield surgery were done during the war of 1853–56. "Nikolai Pirogov, who pioneered the system of field surgery that other nations came to only in the First World War".

The Crimean War also saw the first tactical use of railways and other modern inventions, such as the electric telegraph, with the first "live" war reporting by Russell. Some credit Russell with prompting the resignation of the sitting British government through his reporting of the lacklustre condition of British forces deployed in Crimea. Additionally, the telegraph reduced the independence of British overseas possessions from their commanders in London due to such rapid communications. Newspaper readership informed public opinion in the United Kingdom and France as never before.

The Crimean War was a contributing factor in the Russian abolition of serfdom in 1861: Tsar Alexander II (Nicholas I's son and successor) saw the military defeat of the Russian serf-army by free troops from Britain and France as proof of the need for emancipation. The Crimean War also led to the realisation by the Russian government of its technological inferiority, in military practices as well as weapons.

The most crippling deficiency of the Russian army was its poor interior lines (there were only 8,000 km of paved roads in all of the Russian Empire and less than 1,600 km of rail, none near Crimea), which meant that despite the Russian army possessing vast numerical superiority on paper (having started the war with a million men under arms and recruited a million more during it), their effective strength in actual battles was often equal or inferior to that of their opponents. Tactical inferiority compounded their strategic disadvantages: Russian soldiers were often poorly-trained, and both their artillery and small arms were inferior to those of the Anglo-French. While the latter had at this time standardized rifled firearms, the Russian infantry was still armed predominantly with smoothbore muskets that had changed very little from the time of Peter I, leaving them severely outranged.

Alexander initiated the reforms, which were aimed at strengthening and modernising the Russian state in the light of weaknesses revealed by the war.

== Chronology of major battles of the war ==
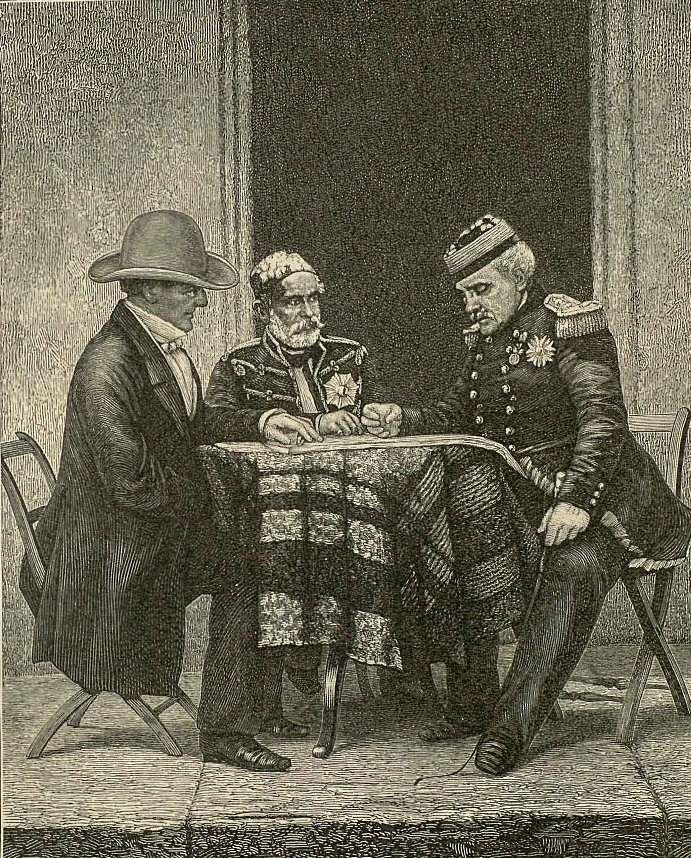
FitzRoy Somerset, Omar Pasha and Marshal Pélissier

- Battle of Sinop, 30 November 1853
- Siege of Silistra, 5 April – 25 June 1854
- First Battle of Bomarsund, 21 June 1854
- Second Battle of Bomarsund, 15 August 1854
- Siege of Petropavlovsk, 30–31 August 1854, on the Pacific coast
- Battle of the Alma, 20 September 1854
- Siege of Sevastopol, 25 September 1854 to 8 September 1855
- Battle of Balaclava, 25 October 1854 (see also Charge of the Light Brigade and the Thin Red Line)
- Battle of Inkerman, 5 November 1854
- Battle of Eupatoria, 17 February 1855
- Battle of the Chernaya (aka "Battle of Traktir Bridge"), 16 August 1855
- Battle of Kinburn (1855), 17 October 1855
- Sea of Azov naval campaign, May to November 1855
- Siege of Kars, June to 28 November 1855

== See also ==
- Crimean War Research Society
- Foreign policy of the Russian Empire
- Egyptian intervention in the Crimean War
- Grand Crimean Central Railway
- International relations (1814–1919)
- List of Crimean War Victoria Cross recipients
- List of British recipients of the Légion d'Honneur for the Crimean War
- Order of Nakhimov
- Peace Concluded (painting)
- Nikolskaya sopka
- List of war films and TV specials set between 1775 and 1914#Crimean War (1853–1856) (depictions in film and television)

== Citations ==
=== Sources ===
- Егоршина, Петрова (2023). История русской армии [The history of the Russian Army] (in Russian). Moscow: Moskva. ISBN 978-5-699-42397-2.
- Airapetov, Oleg (2017). Крымская война [Crimean War] (in Russian). Regnum. ISBN 978-5-91150-036-8.
- Arnold, Guy (2002). Historical Dictionary of the Crimean War. Scarecrow Press. ISBN 978-0-81086613-3.
- * Badem, Candan (2010). The Ottoman Crimean War (1853-1856). BRILL. doi:10.1163/ej.9789004182059.i-432. ISBN 978-90-04-18205-9. JSTOR 10.1163/j.ctt1w8h1kf. OCLC 1247557705, 668221743.
- Clodfelter, M. (2017). Warfare and Armed Conflicts: A Statistical Encyclopedia of Casualty and Other Figures, 1492–2015 (4th ed.). Jefferson, North Carolina: McFarland. ISBN 978-0786474707.
- Dumas, S.; Vedel-Petersen, K.O. (1923). Losses of Life Caused By War. Oxford: Clarendon Press. pp. 41–42.
- Figes, Orlando (2010). Crimea: The Last Crusade. London: Allen Lane. ISBN 978-0-7139-9704-0.
- Figes, Orlando (2011). The Crimean War: A History. Henry Holt and Company. ISBN 978-1429997249.
- Greenwood, Adrian (2015). Victoria's Scottish Lion: The Life of Colin Campbell, Lord Clyde. UK: History Press. p. 496. ISBN 978-0-7509-5685-7. Archived from the original on 21 February 2016.
- Kissinger, H. (2012). Diplomacy. Simon & Schuster UK. ISBN 978-1-4711-0449-7.
- Marriott, J.A.R. (1917). The Eastern Question. An Historical Study in European Diplomacy. Oxford at the Clarendon Press.
- Small, Hugh (2007), The Crimean War: Queen Victoria's War with the Russian Tsars, Tempus
- Tarle, Evgenii Viktorovich (1950). Crimean War (in Russian). Vol. II. Moscow and Leningrad: Izdatel'stvo Akademii Nauk.
- Tarle, Yevgeny (1959). Writings (in Russian). Vol. 9. Moscow: USSR Academy of Sciences Press.
- Porter, Maj Gen Whitworth (1889). History of the Corps of Royal Engineers. Vol. I. Chatham: The Institution of Royal Engineers.
- Royle, Trevor (2000), Crimea: The Great Crimean War, 1854–1856, Palgrave Macmillan, ISBN 1-4039-6416-5
- Taylor, A. J. P. (1954). The Struggle for Mastery in Europe: 1848–1918. Oxford University Press.
- Troubetzkoy, Alexis S. (2006). A Brief History of the Crimean War. London: Constable & Robinson. ISBN 978-1-84529-420-5.
