= Vasile Obedeanu =

Romanian military officer and politician (1834–1902)

Member of the Senate of Romania
- In office 1884–1886
- In office 1895–1902

Personal details
- Born: 1 January 1834 Caracal, Romanați, Wallachia
- Died: 1902 (aged 67–68)
- Resting place: Bellu Cemetery, Bucharest
- Party: National Liberal Party
- Spouse: Natalia Miclescu
- Children: 8 (including Oscar Obedeanu)
- Parent(s): Petrache Obedeanu; Elisabeta Florescu
- Awards: Order of the Medjidie; Crimea Medal (4 clasps); Turkish Crimea Medal; Order of the Star of Romania; Order of the Crown of Romania; Military Virtue Medal; Danube Crossing Cross; Order of Hohenzollern

Military service
- Allegiance: Ottoman Empire (1853–1856); United Principalities of Moldavia and Wallachia/Kingdom of Romania
- Branch/service: Cavalry
- Rank: Captain (Ottoman Army); Colonel (Romanian Army)
- Battles/wars: Crimean War * Siege of Silistra * Battle of the Alma * Battle of Balaclava * Battle of Inkerman * Siege of Sevastopol; Romanian War of Independence

Vasile Petre Obedeanu (known in Ottoman service as Said Bey or Saïd Bey; 1 January 1834 – 1902) was a Romanian cavalry officer, landowner, and politician. At the outbreak of the Crimean War in 1853, he volunteered for the Ottoman Army, serving as a cavalry captain and aide-de-camp to Marshal Omar Pasha across major campaigns on the Danube and in the Crimean Peninsula. After specialized cavalry training in France, he returned to Romania, taught at the Military School in Bucharest, and later fought against the Ottoman Empire in the Romanian War of Independence (1877–1878), rising to the rank of colonel in the reserve. In civilian life, he was active in the National Liberal Party, serving as prefect of Romanați and Ilfov counties and as a member of both chambers of the Parliament of Romania.

== Early life and education ==
Vasile Obedeanu was born on 1 January 1834 in Caracal, Romanați County, in the Principality of Wallachia (cemetery records list his birth year as 1835). He belonged to an old boyar family from Oltenia with estates in Romanați and elsewhere in the region, as well as residences in Bucharest. His parents were Petrache (Petre) Obedeanu, an Oltenian boyar who held the court ranks of mare agă and logofăt, and Elisabeta Florescu. The family was genealogically connected to the Argetoianu family, from which Petrache Obedeanu had changed his surname to Obedeanu.

Obedeanu attended primary school in Craiova, where his teachers included Ioan Maiorescu, professor and director of the Central School of Craiova. By 1850, his family had settled in Bucharest, where he enrolled at the Military School (graduating in 1854).

== Ottoman service and the Crimean War ==
Vasile Obedeanu as Said Bey, painting by Nicolae Grigorescu

At the outbreak of the Crimean War in 1853, while still a 19-year-old student at the Military School in Bucharest, Obedeanu volunteered for the Ottoman Army. Fluency in three foreign languages facilitated his admission to the general staff of Marshal Omar Pasha, commander of the Ottoman forces in the Danubian Principalities, whom he served as captain aide-de-camp. He held the rank of cavalry captain in the 2nd Regiment of the Sultan's Imperial Guard. During his Ottoman service, Obedeanu bore the name and title Said Bey (Saïd Bey), though he retained his Eastern Orthodox faith and did not convert to Islam.

Oriental Army of the Crimean campaign by Gustav Bartsch. From left to right: Admiral Ferdinand-Alphonse Hamelin, Lord Lucan, Lord Raglan, Admiral Dundas, Sir John Campbell, Duke of Cambridge, Lord Cardigan, Ismail Pasha, Omer Pasha, Muhlis Pasha (Grigore Sturdza), Sultan Abdülmecid I, Said-Bey (Vasile Obedeanu), Ahmed Pasha, col. Desmaret, Marshal Baraguey d'Hilliers, Prince Napoleon, col. Trochu, Marshal de Saint-Arnaud, general Bosquet, general de Canrobert

Obedeanu saw active combat during the Danubian Campaign at the Siege of Silistra, and subsequently in the Crimean Peninsula at the Battle of the Alma, the Battle of Balaclava, the Battle of Inkerman, and the Siege of Sevastopol. For his service in these campaigns, he was awarded the Ottoman Order of the Medjidie, the British Crimea Medal with four clasps, the French Crimean War Medal, and the Turkish Crimea Medal.

== Later military career ==
Sent on the orders of the Sultan, Obedeanu specialized at the Cavalry School in Saumur, France (variously dated to 1855 or immediately after the conclusion of the war), and also served in Constantinople as an attaché at the Ottoman Ministry of War.

Upon returning to Romania, he received the rank of major and served as a cavalry drill instructor and riding professor at the Military School in Bucharest between 1860 and 1862. Although he increasingly turned toward administration and politics, he returned to active military service at the outbreak of the Romanian War of Independence (1877–1878), fighting on the Romanian side against his former Ottoman comrades as a reserve cavalry major.

He continued to advance in the reserve officer corps, appearing in August 1880 as a reserve major in the 10th Călărași Regiment, receiving promotion to lieutenant colonel on 16 March 1883, and attaining the rank of colonel in the reserve cavalry on 10 May 1886. For his participation in the 1877–1878 campaign, he was decorated with the Order of the Star of Romania with swords, the Order of the Crown of Romania, the Military Virtue Medal, the Danube Crossing Cross, the Order of Hohenzollern, the Defenders of Independence Medal, and the Russian commemorative medal of the 1877–1878 war.

Obedeanu remained active in military intellectual circles in retirement. On 16 April 1892, he delivered a lecture at the Reserve Officers' Club in Bucharest on the origins and major historical periods of cavalry and ancient Roman armed forces, published that year as a 17-page brochure titled Conferința asupra originei și epocelor principale ale cavaleriei și puterei armate în vechime la Romani in the Cercul Publicațiunilor Militare series.

== Political and administrative career ==
In civilian life, Obedeanu aligned himself with the National Liberal Party. In the years following the Romanian War of Independence, he served as prefect of Romanați County, succeeding Iorgu Călățeanul and preceding Mihalache Demetrian. On 24 May 1886, he was appointed prefect of Ilfov County, holding that office until March 1888.

After retiring from active military duty, Obedeanu was elected multiple times to both the Chamber of Deputies and the Senate, including his election as senator for Romanați County in September 1895 on the government Liberal ticket. Later in the decade, he became a vocal critic of Prime Minister Dimitrie A. Sturdza's administration during the political controversy surrounding the "Ghenadie Affair" involving Metropolitan Ghenadie Petrescu.

== Personal life and death ==
Obedeanu married Natalia Miclescu (1843–1907), daughter of the great vornic Alexandru Miclescu. The couple had eight children: Ernest, Eduard, Oscar, Constantin, Ecaterina (Catinca), Olga, Alice, and Ioan (born in Craiova on 12 January 1863, who died in infancy).

Two of his sons achieved prominence in public and cultural life:

- Oscar Obedeanu, who studied at the School of Fine Arts in Bucharest and the Academy of Fine Arts in Munich, becoming a history painter noted for military and battle scenes inspired in part by his father's accounts of the Romanian War of Independence.
- Constantin V. Obedeanu, a magistrate and author of historical and political works, including studies on the history and estates of the Obedeanu family.

Vasile Obedeanu died in 1902 and was buried at Bellu Cemetery in Bucharest.
