= Ahmad Pasha al-Munkali =

Egyptian military leader and Nazir al-Jihadia (19th-century)

Ahmad al-Munkali Pasha
- أحمد المنكلي
- Children: Ali Jalal Pasha
- Military career
- Allegiance: Egypt Eyalet
- Branch: Egyptian Armed Forces
- Rank: Lieutenant general
- Commands: Nazir al-Jihadia (Ministry of Defense) (1848)
- Conflicts: Egyptian–Ottoman War (1831–1833); 1838 Druze revolt Egyptian–Ottoman War (1839–1841); Crimean War

Lieutenant general Ahmad Pasha al-Munkali (Arabic: أحمد باشا المنكلي) was one of the most famous Egyptian military leaders in the nineteenth century. He participated in the Syrian war and the Crimean war.

== Military career ==
He was seriously wounded in the 1838 Druze revolt. Al-Munkali participated in the Syrian war with Ibrahim Pasha, son of Mahammad Ali Pasha, who led the infantry in the Battle of Nezib. When the Egyptian armies evacuated the Levant, the army was divided into three divisions, one of which was led by Ibrahim Pasha, the second by Soliman Pasha al-Faransawi, and the third by Ahmad Pasha al-Munkali. Each of these three divisions took a different path.

After his return from Syria, Mahammad Ali appointed him to administrative positions. Then he sent him to Sudan to organize it. But Ibrahim Pasha assigned him in 1848 to reorganize the army and appointed him as Nazir al-Jihadia (Minister of Defense). After Ibrahim Pasha died, Abbas I removed him.

In the Crimean War, Ahmad Pasha al-Munkali replaced Lieutenant General Selim Fathi Pasha in command of the Egyptian armies in Crimea, after the latter was killed in the Battle of Eupatoria. Al-Munkali remained in this position until illness forced him to ask the wāli of Egypt, Sa'id Pasha, for permission to return to Egypt. The wāli responded to his request on Muharram 15, 1272 AH, corresponding to September 27, 1855, and appointed Major General Isma'il Pasha Abu Jabal in his place.

After the Egyptian victory in the Battle of Konya, Ibrahim Pasha appointed Ahmad Mankali Pasha as the Egyptian governor of Adana and Tarsus.

== Political positions ==
Al-Munkali took on the job of Nazir al-Jihadia (Minister of Defense) several times.

== Family ==
His son Ali Jalal Pasha married Princess Zubaida, daughter of Mahammad Ali Tawfik, and with her he had two sons, Mahammad Ali Jalal and Muhyiddin Jalal Bey.

== See also ==
- Selim Fathi Pasha
- Mahammad Rustum Bey
