= Selim Fathi Pasha =

Leader of the Egyptian ground forces in the Crimean War

- سليم فتحي
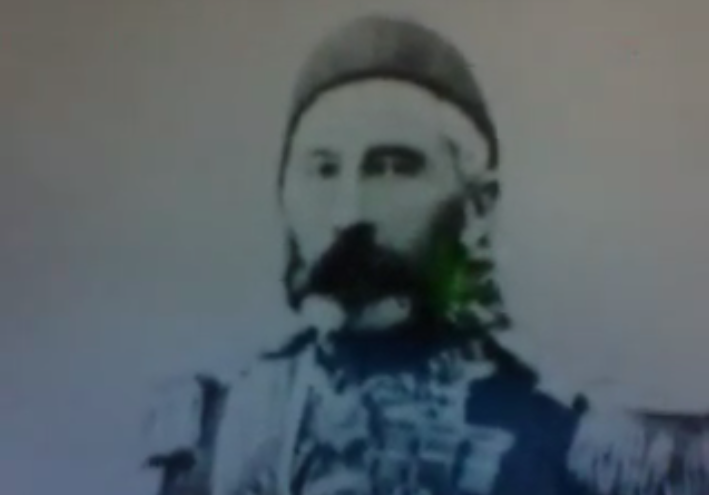
- Born: early 19th-century
- Died: 17 February 1855; Yevpatoria, Russia
- Cause of death: Killed in action
- Burial place: near Juma-Jami Mosque
- Military career
- Allegiance: Egypt Eyalet
- Branch: Egyptian Armed Forces
- Rank: Lieutenant general
- Conflicts: Egyptian–Ottoman War (1831–1833); Egyptian–Ottoman War (1839–1841); Crimean War: Siege of Silistria (1854); Battle of Eupatoria (1855) †

Lieutenant general Selim Fathi Pasha (Egyptian Arabic: سليم فتحي باشا) (Probably born in the early 19th century and killed in the Crimean War on February 17, 1855) was an Egyptian military commander under the Muhammad Ali dynasty, who led the Egyptian ground forces in the Crimean War.

== Military career ==
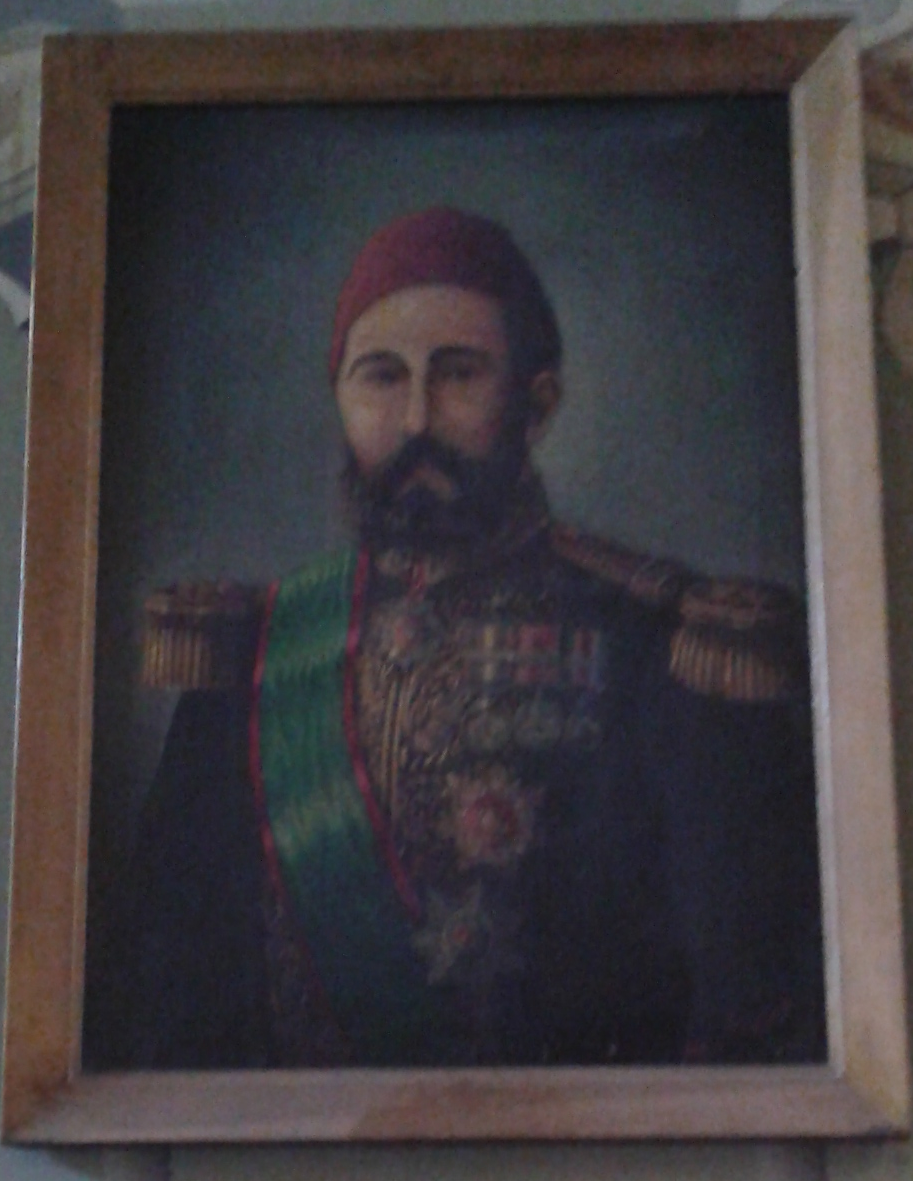
A large-sized color portrait of Lieutenant General Selim Fathi Pasha on display at the Egyptian National Military Museum in the Citadel - Cairo

Prince Omar Toussoun described Selim Pasha as the best student of Soliman Pasha al-Faransawi, to whom Muhammad Ali Pasha entrusted the establishment of the Egyptian army and was its chief of staff. Selim Fathi Pasha participated in the wars of Ibrahim Pasha in the Levant and Anatolia, and was one of their heroes. During the reign of Muhammad Ali Pasha, he became head of the School of Staff of War, then in 1848 he was appointed commander of the infantry (bayada), and he was one of the closest Egyptian military leaders to European civilization.

In the year 1853, Selim Fathi Pasha took command of the ground forces sent by Abbas I to aid the Ottoman Empire in the Crimean War. His army was composed of 6 Alai bayadas (infantry) totaling 15,704 soldiers, Alai Sawari (cavalry) composed of 1,291 soldiers, and Alai Tobgia (artillery) composed of 2,727 soldiers, numbering 12 batteries, each with six cannons, so the total number of its cannons was 72, and the total of this ground army was 19,722 soldiers.

== Family and children ==
He married Ayesha Hanem al-Farwajiya a noblewoman who originally came from Makkah Modern day Saudi Arabia and had two children. Among his most prominent descendants is the military historian Major General Staff of War Hassan Fathi (1921–2008), author of the encyclopedia “Arts of War in the Islamic Conquests, فنون الحرب في الفتوحات الإسلامية.”

== Honoring ==
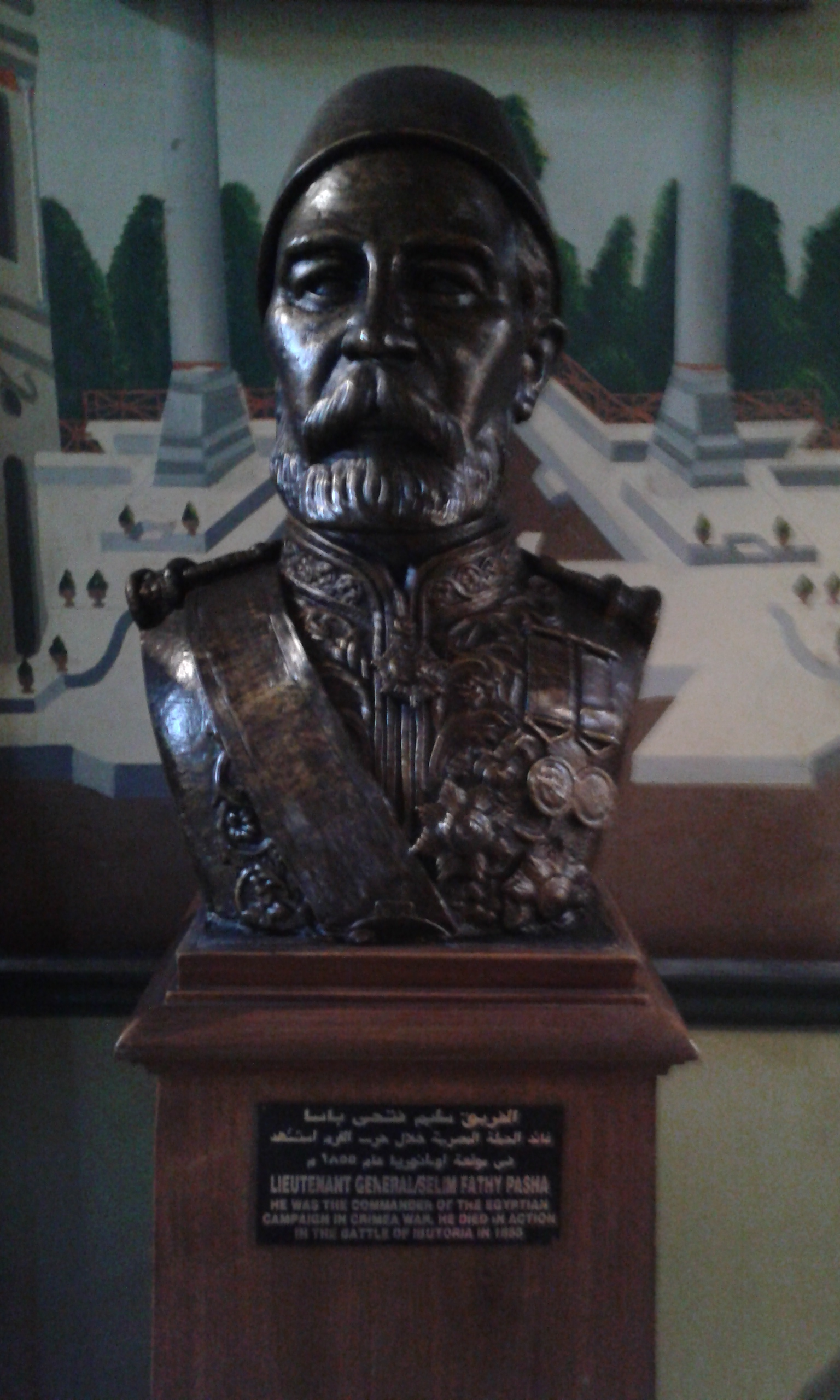
A bust of Selim Fathi Pasha is on display at the National Military Museum in the Citadel, Cairo

There is a bust of Lieutenant General Selim Fathi Pasha in the Egyptian National Military Museum located on Citadel Street in Cairo, and a large-sized color portrait.

== Death ==
Lieutenant General Selim Pasha Fathi was killed in the Battle of Eupatoria in the Crimean War on Saturday the 29th of Jumada al-Awwal in the year 1271 AH, corresponding to February 17, 1855, AD. He was buried on the orders of the Serdar (commander) of the Ottoman Armies, Ikram Omar Pasha, in Yevpatoria near the Juma-Jami Mosque, and he was replaced in command of the Egyptian forces by Ahmad Pasha al-Munkali until September 27, 1855.

== See also ==
- Mahammad Rustum Bey
