= Pyotr Gorchakov =

Russian general (1790–1868)

Pyotr Dmitrievich Gorchakov
- Пётр Дми́триевич Горчако́в
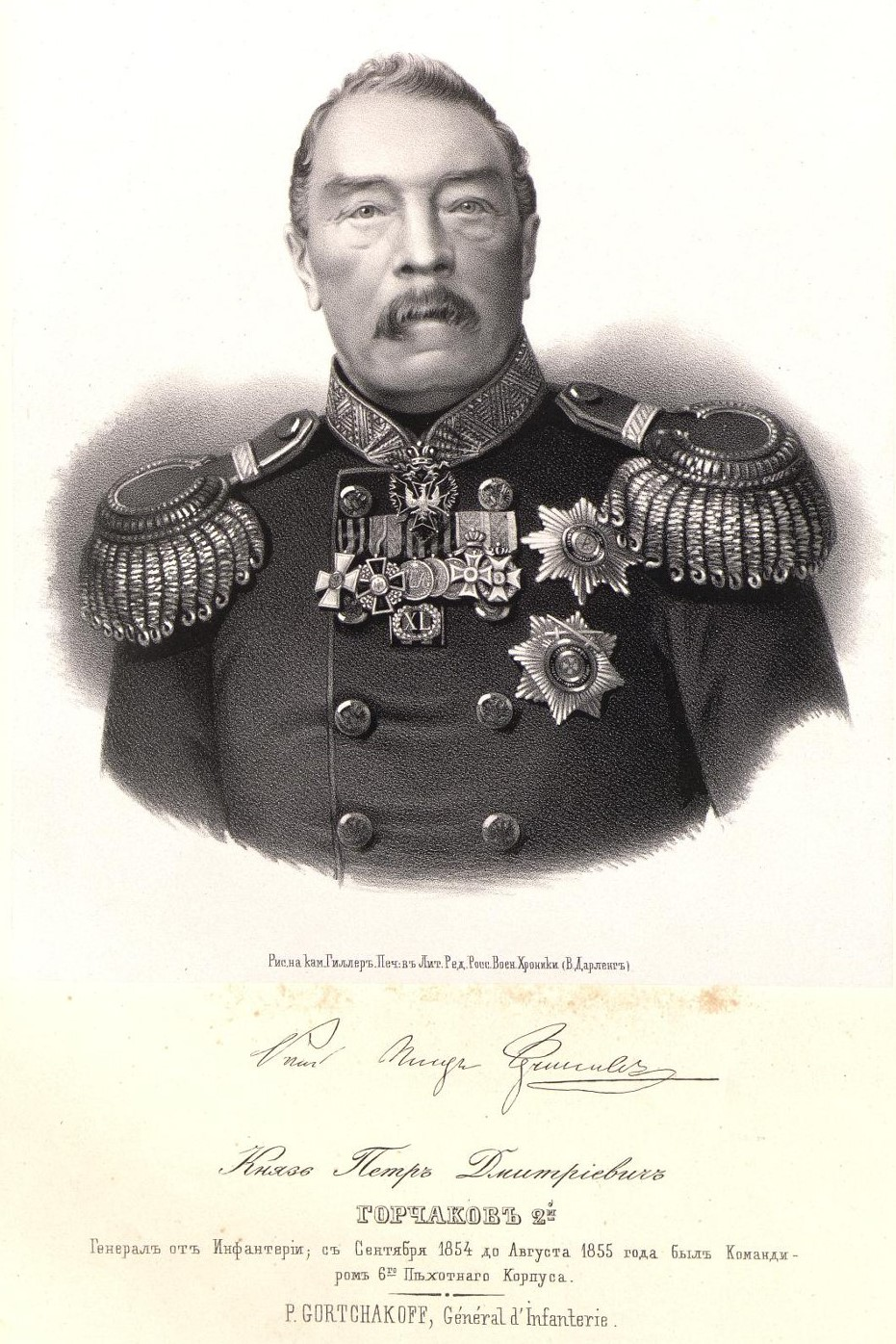
- Prince Pyotr Dmitrievich Gorchakov
- Born: 24 June 1790; Russian Empire
- Died: 6 March 1868 (aged 77); Moscow, Russian Empire
- Relatives: Mikhail Dmitrievich Gorchakov (brother)
- Military career
- Allegiance: Russian Empire
- Branch: Imperial Russian Army
- Rank: General
- Commands: VI Army Corps
- Conflicts: Russo-Turkish War (1806–1812); Napoleonic Wars; Crimean War

Prince Pyotr Dmitrievich Gorchakov (Russian: Пётр Дми́триевич Горчако́в; 24 June 1790 – 6 March 1868) was an Imperial Russian Army general from the Gorchakov family of Russian nobility.

== Life ==
He was an elder brother of Mikhail D. Gorchakov (1793–1861) imperial general of the artillery. He served under Mikhail Kamensky and Mikhail Kutuzov in the campaign against Turkey, and afterward against France in 1813–1814. In 1820 he suppressed an insurrection in the Caucasus, for which service he was raised to the rank of major-general. In 1828–1829 he fought under Prince Peter von Wittgenstein against the Turks, won an action at Aidos, and signed the treaty of peace at Adrianople. In 1839 he was made governor of Eastern Siberia, and in 1851, he retired into private life.

When the Crimean War broke out he offered his services to the emperor Nicholas, by whom he was appointed general of the VI army corps in the Crimea. He commanded the corps in the battles of Alma and Inkerman. He retired in 1855 and died at Moscow, on March 18, 1868.
