= Ferdinand-Alphonse Hamelin =

French admiral (1796–1864)

Ferdinand Alphonse Hamelin
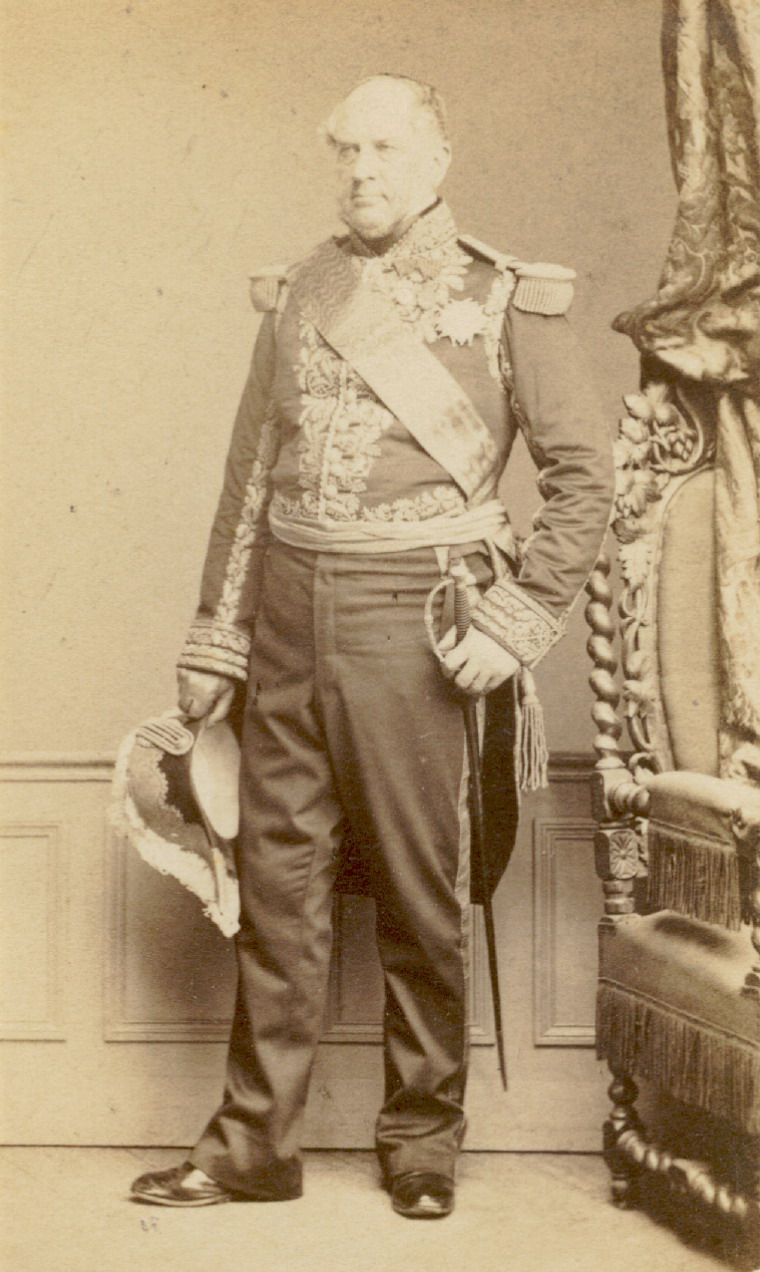
- Hamelin c. 1860–64
- Born: 2 September 1796; Pont-l'Évêque, Calvados, Normandy, France
- Died: 2 January 1864 (aged 67)
- Relatives: Jacques Félix Emmanuel Hamelin
- Military career
- Allegiance: (France) First French Empire, Second French Republic
- Branch: French Navy
- Service years: 1806 – 1860
- Rank: Admiral
- Conflicts: Napoleonic Wars; Crimean War; Battle of Sevastopol
- Awards: Legion of Honor
- Other work: Minister of Marine

Ferdinand-Alphonse Hamelin (2 September 1796 – 10 January 1864), French admiral, was born in Pont-l'Évêque, Normandy. He was the nephew of Jacques Félix Emmanuel Hamelin, a successful rear admiral in the French Navy of the Napoleonic era.

== Early career ==
Hamelin went to sea in 1806 as cabin boy with his uncle, Jacques Félix Emmanuel Hamelin, on the frigate Vénus in the era of Napoleon and the French Empire. The Vénus was part of the French squadron in the Indian Ocean during the Mauritius Campaign of 1809-1811, and young Hamelin had an opportunity of seeing much active service. She, in company with another and a smaller vessel, captured the English frigate Ceylon in 1810, but was immediately afterwards captured herself by the Boadicea, under Commodore Josias Rowley (1765–1842). Young Hamelin was a prisoner of war for a short time.

== Career after the First French Empire fell ==
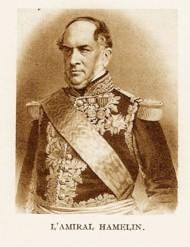
Portrait of Ferdinand Hamelin

He returned to France in 1811. On the fall of the Empire he had better fortune than most of the Napoleonic officers who were turned ashore. In 1821 he became lieutenant, and in 1823 took part in the French expedition under the Duke of Angoulême into Spain. In 1828 he was appointed captain of the Actéon, and was engaged till 1831 on the coast of Algiers and in the conquest of the town and country. His first command as flag officer was in the Pacific, where he showed much tact during the dispute over the Marquesas Islands with England in 1844.

He was promoted vice-admiral in 1848. During the Crimean War he commanded in the Black Sea, and co-operated with Admiral Dundas in the bombardment of Sevastopol on 17 October 1854. His relations with his English colleague were not very cordial. On 7 December 1854 he was promoted to admiral. Shortly afterwards he was recalled to France, and was named minister of marine.

Oriental Army of the Crimean campaign by Gustav Bartsch. From left to right: Admiral Ferdinand-Alphonse Hamelin, Lord Lucan, Lord Raglan, Admiral Dundas, Sir John Campbell, Duke of Cambridge, Lord Cardigan, Ismail Pasha, Omer Pasha, Muhlis Pasha (Grigore Sturdza), Sultan Abdülmecid I, Said-Bey (Vasile Obedeanu), Ahmed Pasha, col. Desmaret, Marshal Baraguey d'Hilliers, Prince Napoleon, col. Trochu, Marshal de Saint-Arnaud, general Bosquet, general de Canrobert

His administration lasted till 1860, and was remarkable for the expeditions to Italy and China organized under his directions; but it was even more notable for the energy shown in adopting and developing the use of armour. The launch of the Gloire in 1859 set the example of constructing seagoing ironclads. When Napoleon III made his first concession to Liberal opposition, Admiral Hamelin was one of the ministers sacrificed. He held no further command, and died on 10 January 1864.
