= 1838 Druze revolt =

Druze uprising in Syria against the Ottoman Egypt Eyalet (1838)

- Part of Campaigns of Muhammad Ali of Egypt
Date	January 1838 - July 1838
Location	Ottoman Syria (Hauran, Galilee and Mount Lebanon)
Result	Revolt suppressed

Belligerents
Egypt Eyalet; Shihab's forces supported by: Anaza tribe; Wuld Ali tribe; Sulut tribe of Laja (since March 1838)	Druze clans supported by: Sulut tribe of Laja (until March 1838); Maydan quarter of Damascus

Commanders and leaders
Ibrahim Pasha; Muhammad Pasha; Ahmed Pasha al-Mankili (WIA); Sharif Pasha; Bashir Shihab II; Khalil Shihab	Shibly al-Aryan; Hasan Junbalat; Nasir ad-Din al-Imad

Strength
15,000	8,000

Casualties and losses
unknown	unknown

The 1838 Druze revolt was a Druze uprising in Syria against the authority of Ibrahim Pasha and effectively against the Egypt Eyalet under Muhammad Ali. The rebellion was led by Druze clans of Mount Lebanon, with an aim to expel the Egyptian forces, under Ibrahim Pasha considering them as infidels.

The revolt was suppressed with a bitter campaign by Ibrahim Pasha, after a major Druze defeat in the Wadi al-Taym, and the Egyptian rule effectively restored in Galilee and Mount Lebanon with a peace agreement signed between the Egyptians and Druze leaders on 23 July 1838.

== Background ==
The tensions between the Druze and the Egyptians had been mounting since the 1834 Syrian Peasant Revolt (1834). The ruling classes of the region resented Egyptian authority and the Druze in particular resisted the rule of Ibrahim Pasha, who personally considered the Druze as heretics and oppressed them. What sparked the revolt itself, however, was the conscription decree of the Egyptian army.

== Revolt ==
The first reports of the Druze uprising came in January 1838. Some 400 troops, led by Ali Agha al-Busayli, governor of Hauran, attacked the Druzes in Tha'la, and suffered the first defeat, as Ali and a large number of his troops were killed. The Egyptian troops, dispatched from Damascus were slaughtered by Druze peasants during the night. Later, a second force of 6,000 regulars was sent, requiring the Druze to reorganize for more serious fighting. The Egyptian army, led by Muhammad Pasha forced the Druze to withdraw but, exhausted from traversing the mountainous terrain, were repelled by the Druze fighters near Smaid. A new Egyptian force, led by Minikly Pasha, Egyptian Minister of War, and Sharif Pasha was again defeated by some 2,000 Druze insurgents.

The successive defeats prompted Ibrahim Pasha to arrive from Aleppo by himself. Ibrahim recruited loyal Albanians and recalled reinforcements from Hama, Acre and Aleppo, creating an army which according to British officials counted some 15,000 men. The force blockaded the Lajat field north of Hauran, while Sharif Pasha began negotiations with the insurgents. The Druze refused to lay down their weapons, but concerned with the size of the amounting armies, tried to enlist additional forces to support the revolt from across Syria and Lebanon. The attempt was largely unsuccessful, and effectively failed.

In early April, Shibli al-Aryan attempted to secure more fighters from the supportive villages and succeeded in raising some 8,000 fighters. Soon, the Druze of Mount Lebanon began streaming to join the rebel ranks, and from April it seemed the rebellion incorporated the entire Druze community. The main roads were cut by the Druze, disrupting the Egyptian army supplies. At this point, Ibrahim Pasha ordered Emir Bashir Shihab II, his ally, to send 1,000 men to Wadi al-Taym, where the clashes erupted on April 7. The Egyptian army was commanded by Ahmad Bek, consisting of an infantry regiment, 300 Bedouins and 500 irregulars, which succeeded to overwhelm the Druzes with 33 dead, scores wounded and four taken prisoner. Egyptian losses were 13 killed, 65 wounded.

Following the defeat by Ahmad Bek, Shibli occupied Rashayya and killed its governor, while Druze volunteers kept flowing in to join his forces. Another reinforcement of 4,000 men was requested by Ibrahim Pasha from Bashir Shihab II, and arrived under the command of Bashir's son. Joined by two sheikhs from Mount Lebanon—Hasan Junbalat and Nasir ad-Din al-Imad—the Druze fighters were led into Wadi Bakka, where on July 4 they suffered a decisive defeat, losing some 640 men including al-Imad.

In early July, tensions still mounted as the Druze rebels captured an Egyptian garrison outside of Safed. The local Safed militia of several hundred was heavily outnumbered by the Druze, and the city was gripped in despair as the militia eventually abandoned the city and the Druze rebels entered the city on July 5. The resulting plunder by the Druze rebels, which targeted the Jewish community, lasted for three days. Much of the local population sought refuge in Acre.

Subsequently, Shibli moved to southern Wadi al-Taym, where he was attacked by the Christian fighters of Emir Bashir, led by his son Emir Khalil. The attack was unsuccessful, and the Druze succeeded in withstanding the pressure until July 17, when Egyptian reinforcements crushed them at Shebaa. Shibli and 1,500 of his men fled to Mount Hermon, while most of the insurgents in the Hauran surrendered and were granted amnesty.

== Agreement ==
The critical points to end the rebellion were the water war, engaged by Egyptian forces upon the Druze population and the effective defeat of the main insurgent force in Wadi al-Taym. It persuaded Druze leaders to negotiate peace with Ibrahim Pasha. Sheikh Hasan al-Bitar of Rashaya and the Christian Jiris Abu ad-Dibs mediated the agreement, whereby Ibrahim Pasha agreed to give amnesty to insurgents and to put the Druze into forced labor in lieu of exemption from conscription, in return for the surrender of Druze arms and those seized from Egyptians. The agreement was signed on July 23, 1838. At first, the Druze willingly surrendered their arms, but it soon became clear, that those were not the arms that had been used in the fighting, prompting Ibrahim Pasha to send his officers with a demand for an immediate surrender of the entire Druze arsenal. The process continued slowly, and lasted until August.

== Aftermath ==
Small groups of insurgents still refused to lay their weapons, including Shibli in Mount Hermon and sheikh Husain Abu Asaf in Lajat. Shibli eventually fled to Baalbek, but forced into hiding, he finally surrendered to the Egyptians. When Shibli met Ibrahim Pasha, he proposed his services as an irregular, and was accepted into Egyptian service. Shibli was later sent out of the country, appointed to Sinar. Apparently, Shibli was still in service of Ibrahim by late 1840, when Egyptians began evacuating Syria and Lebanon. The last 100 Druze rebels in Lajat were joined by another 400 Druze insurgents by 1839, and were reportedly devastated a village near Hasbaya. The dominance of Ibrahim Pasha over Ottoman Syria diminished with the 1840 agreement, which was signed during the Second Egyptian-Ottoman War (1839-1841).

== See also ==
- Hauran Druze Rebellion
