= Mikhail Dmitrievich Gorchakov =

Russian general (1793–1861)

Prince Mikhail Dmitrievich Gorchakov
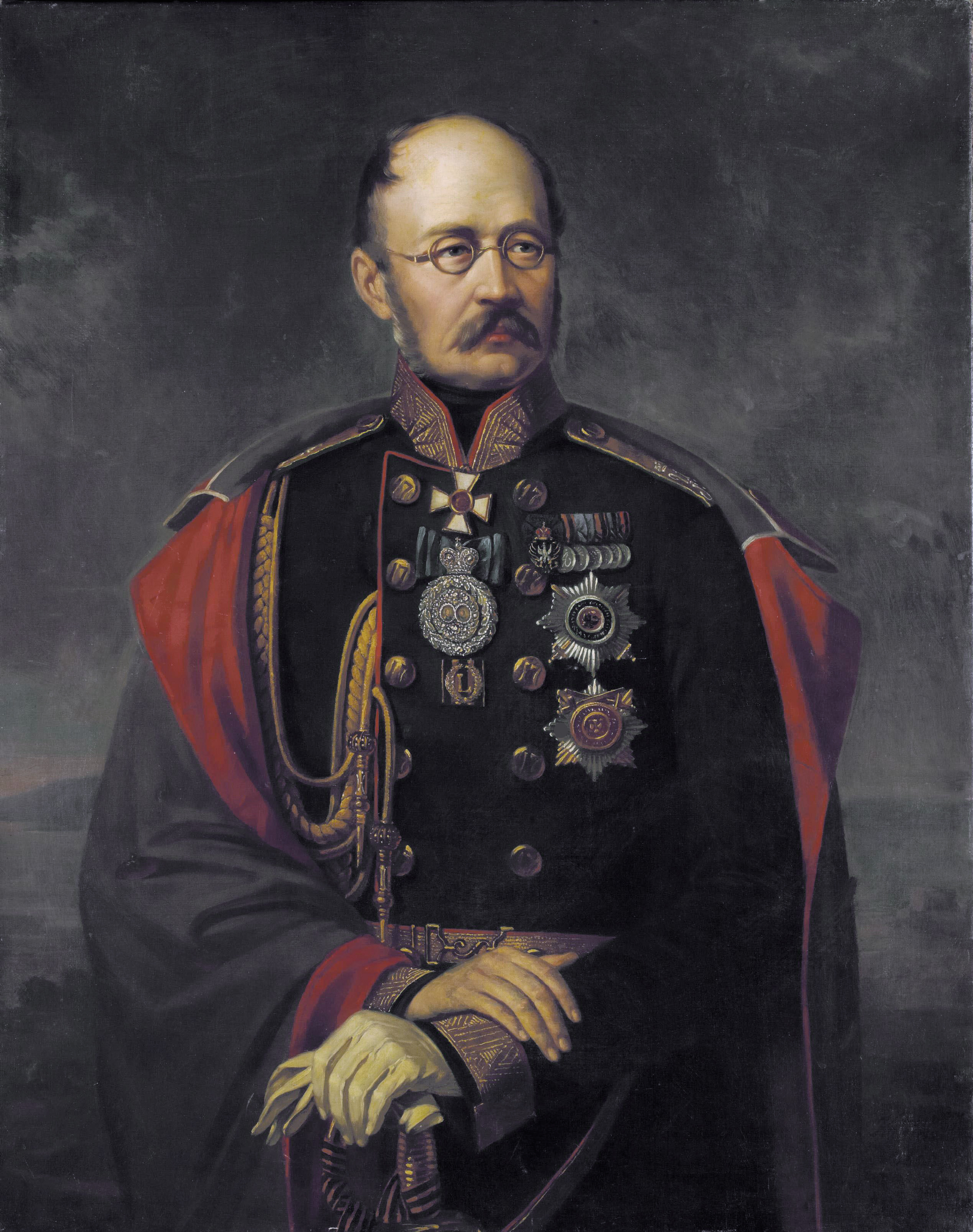
- Portrait by Jan Ksawery Kaniewski, 1860
- Born: 8 February 1793; Warsaw, Polish–Lithuanian Commonwealth
- Died: 30 May 1861 (aged 68); Warsaw, Congress Poland, Russian Empire
- Burial place: Brotherhood Cemetery, Sevastopol
- Military career
- Allegiance: Russia
- Branch: Imperial Russian Army
- Service years: 1807–1861
- Rank: General of the Artillery
- Conflicts: See battles: Russo-Persian War (1804–1813); Napoleonic Wars; Battle of Borodino; Battle of Bautzen; Russo-Turkish War; November Uprising; Battle of Olszynka Grochowska (WIA); Battle of Ostrolenka; Battle of Warsaw; Crimean War; Siege of Silistra; Battle of the Chernaya; Battle of the Great Redan; Battle of Malakoff
- Awards: Order of St. Andrew; Order of St. George; Order of St. Vladimir

Prince Mikhail Dmitrievich Gorchakov (Russian: Михаи́л Дми́триевич Горчако́в, Polish: Michaił Dymitrowicz Gorczakow; 8 February [O.S. 28 January] 1793 – 30 May [O.S. 18 May] 1861, Warsaw) was a Russian general of the artillery from the Gorchakov family, who commanded the Russian forces in the latter stages of the Crimean War and later served as the namestnik of Poland from 1856 until his death. His military career included remarkable successes, such as the Battle of the Great Redan, as well as significant setbacks, such as the Battle of the Chernaya.

== Life and career ==
Mikhail and his brother Pyotr Gorchakov were the children of a notable writer Prince Dmitri Petrovich Gorchakov and his wife Natalie Boborykina. Mikhail entered the Russian army in 1807 as a cadet of the Leib Guard Artillery battalion. In 1809 in the rank of lieutenant he took part in the campaigns against Persia.

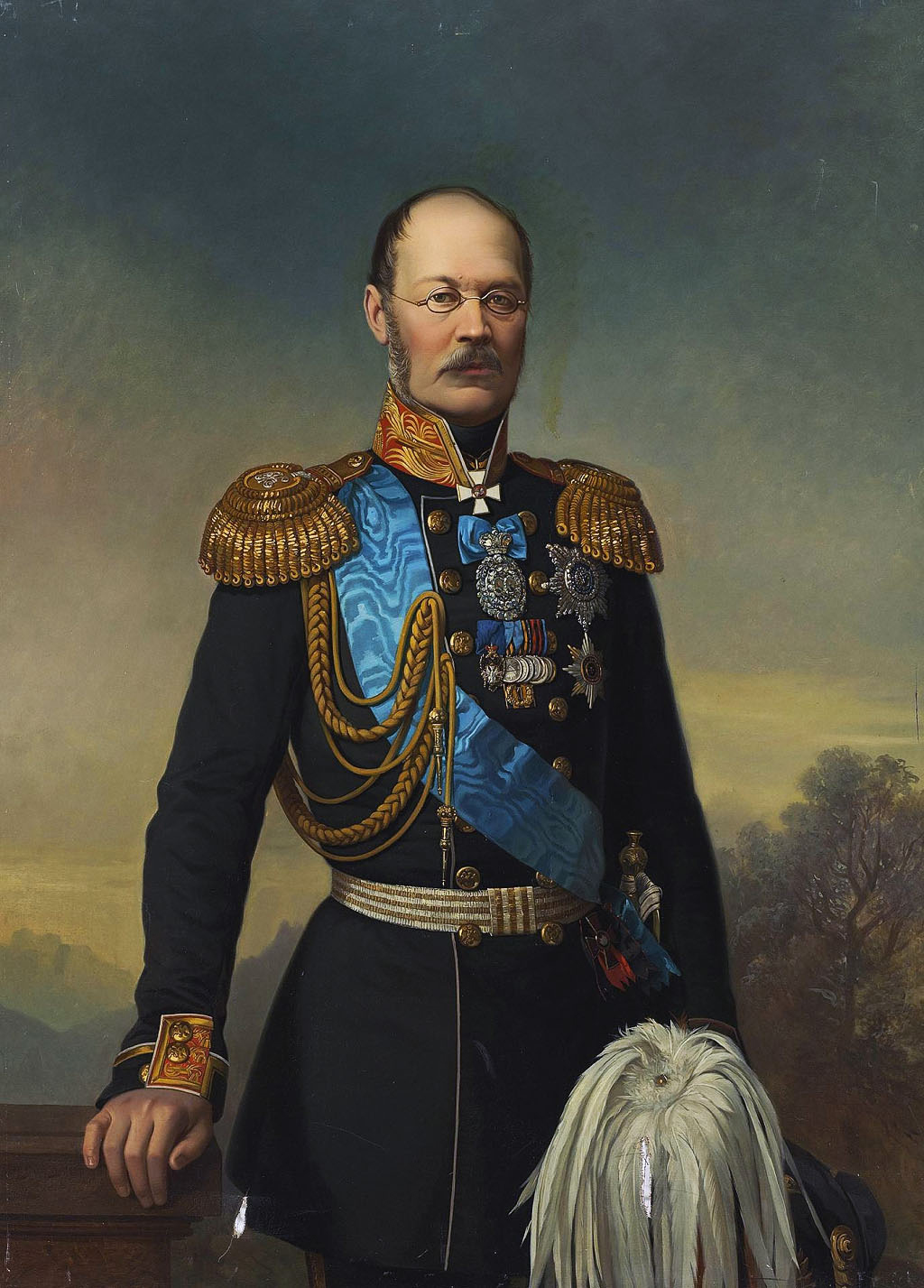
1871 portrait by Egor Ivanovich Botman

During the Napoleonic Wars he distinguished himself at Borodino (received the Order of St. Vladimir of 4th degree) and at Bautzen (received the Order of St. Anna of 2nd degree, the Prussian Order Pour le Mérite and the rank of staff-captain). His career quickly developed and in 1824 he was a Major General. Gorchakov demonstrated bravery during the Russo-Turkish War of 1828–1829, on 29 May 1829 he was one of the first to swim across the Danube. He was present at the sieges of Silistria and Shumna.

After being appointed, on 6 December 1829 a general officer, after 7 February 1831 Gorchakov replaced wounded General Ivan Sukhozanet as the head of the artillery of the Acting Army. Later he was present in the campaign in Poland, and was wounded at the Battle of Olszynka Grochowska, on February 25, 1831. He also distinguished himself at the Battle of Ostrołęka and at the taking of Warsaw.

During the next years he served under Field Marshal Ivan Paskevich as the head of the Staff of the Acting Army. For these services he was promoted to the rank of lieutenant-general and numerous supreme Russian and foreign awards.

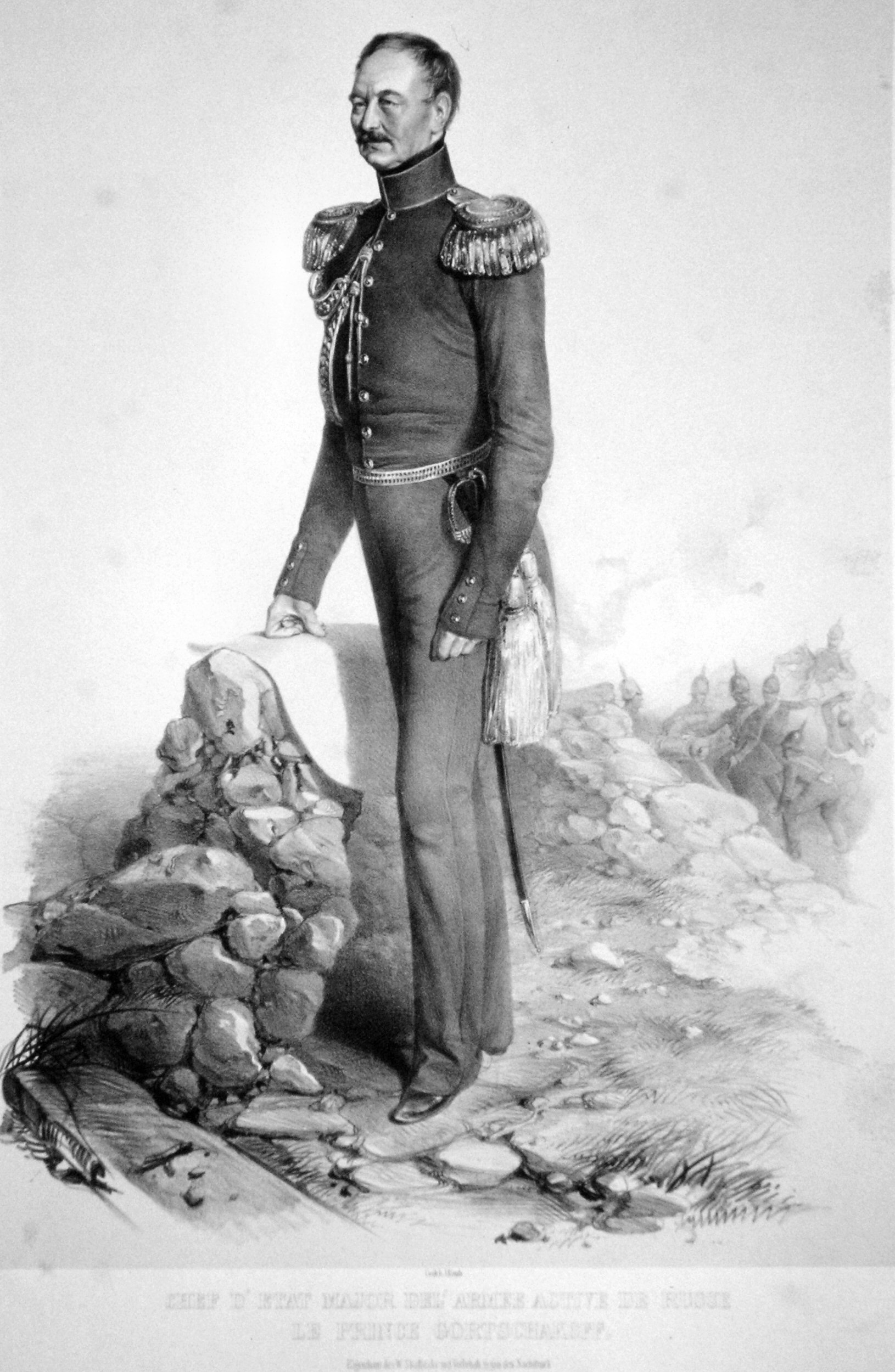
1849 lithograph by August Strixner

In 1846, he was nominated military governor of Warsaw. In 1849 he commanded the Russian artillery in the war against the Hungarians, and in 1852 he visited London as a representative of the Russian army at the funeral of the duke of Wellington. At this time he was chief of the staff of the Russian army and adjutant general to the tsar.

Upon Russia declaring war against Turkey in 1853, he was appointed commander-in-chief of the troops which occupied Moldavia and Wallachia. In 1854, he crossed the Danube and besieged Silistra, but was superseded in April by Prince Ivan Paskevich, who, however, resigned on June 8, when Gorchakov resumed the command. In July the siege of Silistra was aborted due to Austrian diplomatic pressure, and the Russian armies recrossed the Danube; in August they withdrew to Russia.

In 1855, Gorchakov was appointed commander-in-chief of the Russian forces in the Crimea in place of the disgraced Prince Menshikov. Gorchakov's defence of Sevastopol, and final retreat to the northern part of the town, which he continued to defend till peace was signed in Paris, were conducted with skill and energy. The Battle of the Great Redan against British forces was a notable local victory. In 1856 he was appointed as the namestnik of Poland in succession to Prince Paskevich. He died at Warsaw on May 30, 1861, and was buried, in accordance with his own wish, at Sevastopol.

== Sources ==
- "Горчаков, Михаил Дмитриевич" . Brockhaus and Efron Encyclopedic Dictionary (in Russian). 1906.
