= Mahammad Rustum Bey =

Egyptian military commander

- محمد رستم
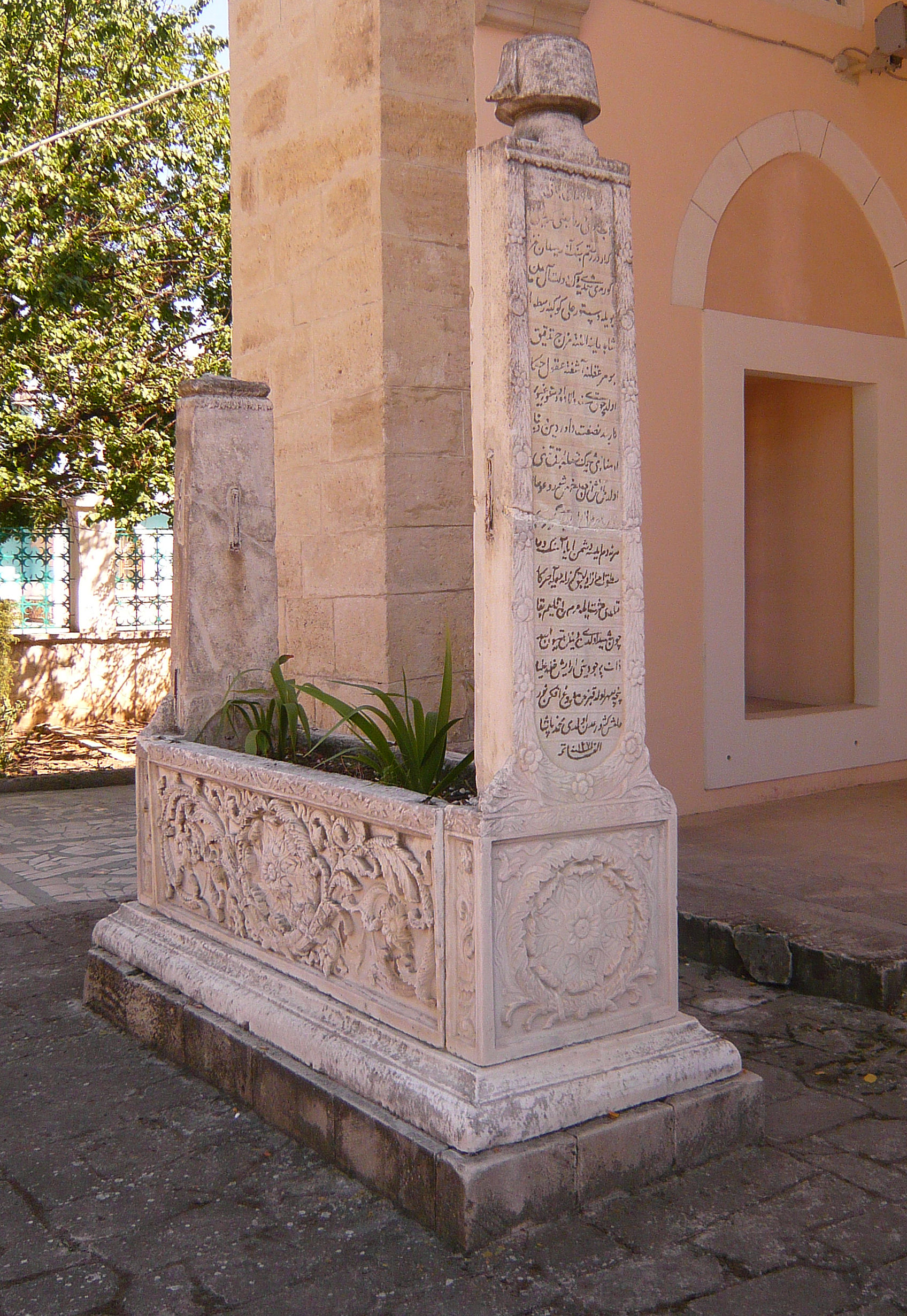
- Rustum Bey's grave outside the Juma-Jami Mosque
- Died: 1855; Yevpatoria, Russia
- Cause of death: Killed in action
- Burial place: Juma-Jami Mosque
- Military career
- Allegiance: Egypt Eyalet
- Branch: Egyptian Armed Forces
- Rank: Miralay (Brigadier general)
- Conflicts: Battle of Eupatoria (1855)

Miralay (Brigadier general) Mahammad Rustum Bey (Egyptian Arabic: محمد رستم بك) was an Egyptian military commander who participated in the Crimean War as the commander of one of the Egyptian army's Alay (regiments) that fought in the war alongside the Ottoman army. Rustum Bey was killed in the Battle of Eupatoria and was buried in the Juma-Jami Mosque in the city of Yevpatoria in Crimea.
