= Isma'il Pasha Abu Jabal =

19th century Egyptian military and political leader (1234 AH – 17 1300 AH)

Ismail Abu Jabal Pasha
- إسماعيل أبو جبل
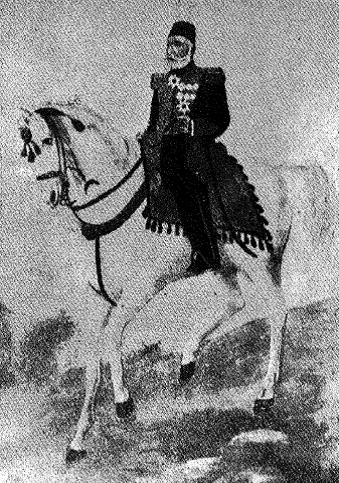
- Born: 1818-1819 / 1234 AH; Elâzığ, Ottoman Empire
- Died: 24 April 1883 / 17 Jumada al-Thani 1300 AH; Cairo, Khedivate of Egypt
- Military career
- Allegiance: Egypt Eyalet; Khedivate of Egypt
- Branch: / Egyptian Armed Forces
- Conflicts: Wahhabi War; Crimean War

'Amir al-Liwa' Ismail Pasha Abu Jabal (Egyptian Arabic: إسماعيل باشا أبو جبل) (1819-1818 / 1234 AH – 24 April 1883 / 17 Jumada al-Thani 1300 AH) was an Egyptian military and political leader who lived in the nineteenth century. He participated as a brigade commander in the Crimean War, which the Egyptian army fought alongside the armies of the Ottoman Empire, and then the wāli of Egypt, Sa'id Pasha, assigned him - on Muharram 15, 1272 AH, corresponding to September 27, 1855 AD - to lead the Egyptian armies in the Crimea after Ahmad Pasha al-Munkali was excused due to ill health.

== Upbringing ==
Ismail Haqqi bin Suleiman bin Bakir bin Ahmad was born in the year 1234 AH in the village of Muridi, in the state of Ma'amoura al-Aziz (Elazığ) in Anatolia, and his father was the Kaymakam of his village. His father sent him to Egypt in the year 1248 AH, where he joined the Darsakhana School in the Citadel, where he mastered the Turkish and Persian languages speaking and writing. Then he moved to the military schools in Bujaq al-Nakhila (in Khanka).

== Military career ==
On 4 Safar 1250 AH, he was attached to the 21st Infantry Alai (regiment) (21st Ji Alai Bayada) with the position of Barinji Alamdar, then he was promoted to the rank of first lieutenant in Barinji Orta (battalion) 8 J Block, and was soon promoted to the rank of Yuzbashi Baranji Orta Barinji Block on 6 Dhu al-Qadah. Then he traveled within the forces of Ibrahim Pasha to fight the Wahhabis, and there he was promoted to the rank of Barinji Saghul Aghasi, then he was promoted to the rank of 2nd G Bekbashi after he proved his worth in the battle of Jabal al-Diriyah, then he was promoted to the rank of Barinji Bekbashi (which is equivalent to the rank of Kaymakam) and was appointed commander of a group of soldiers that fought a decisive battle in which Ismail Pasha performed well.

After Ismail Pasha returned from Hejaz with the Egyptian expedition, he was granted the rank of Amiralai, and on the seventh of Jumada al-Thani in the year 1266 AH, he was promoted to the rank of Major General, and was entrusted with the command of Alai 3G and Alai 4G Bayada (infantry), then he was appointed Director of the General Directorates of Qena and Esna, then Hakmdar (governor) of Sudan and a commander of its soldiers, then he returned to Egypt and was appointed general of Beringi Alai and 4G Alai Bayada.

Oriental Army of the Crimean campaign by Gustav Bartsch. From left to right: Admiral Ferdinand-Alphonse Hamelin, Lord Lucan, Lord Raglan, Admiral Dundas, Sir John Campbell, Duke of Cambridge, Lord Cardigan, Ismail Pasha, Omer Pasha, Muhlis Pasha (Grigore Sturdza), Sultan Abdülmecid I, Said-Bey (Vasile Obedeanu), Ahmed Pasha, col. Desmaret, Marshal Baraguey d'Hilliers, Prince Napoleon, col. Trochu, Marshal de Saint-Arnaud, general Bosquet, general de Canrobert

When the Crimean War broke out, the Ottoman Empire requested an Egyptian expedition to fight the Russians, so the Egyptian government prepared an army whose commander-in-chief was Ahmad Pasha al-Munkali, and Ismail Pasha Abu Jabal was appointed as a second commandant of three columns of Bayada soldiers, alai of Zarkh cavalry, and a section of Tobgia (artillery) instead of Major General Ahmad Pasha Shukri.

Then al-Munkali Pasha was relieved of command of the expedition due to his ill health, so Sa'id Pasha relieved him on September 27, 1855, AD (Muharram 15, 1272 AH), and Ismail Pasha Abu Jabal took his place.

Following Abu Jabal's return to Egypt in the year 1272 AH, he was appointed temporary president of the Tanta Council, then he was appointed general commander (commander-in-chief) of the infantry soldiers, during the reign of Sa'id Pasha, and he remained in this position until the Nizarat al-Jihadia (Ministry of War) order was issued to dispense with all brigades and assistants, so he resigned and was given Atyan. As a pensioner, however, he was soon returned to military service and appointed a major general in charge of the al-Ma'ia al-Sunnia soldiers, then he was appointed a member of the ruling council, then he was appointed “Sir Çeşmeh Ordi” in the Jihadia office instead of Ali Pasha Qulli, then he returned again to the ruling council, which he soon returned to. It was canceled by order of Sa'id Pasha, so Ismail Pasha was appointed commissioner to sell the Miri properties (government properties) to pay off the debts.

Meanwhile, the Arabs of Faiyum and al-Wahat rebelled, so Ismail Pasha was appointed as an extraordinary military commander to put down their revolt. He succeeded in doing so, then he was appointed director of the Qena and Esna districts. At that time, the Crown Prince of Belgium (King Leopold II later) came to visit Upper Egypt, and Ismail Pasha met him. He stayed with him for the duration of his stay, and when the Belgian prince returned to his country, the government of Belgium presented Abu Jabal with the Order of Leopold, with the rank of Officer, accompanied by a letter of thanks received from the Ministry of Foreign Affairs, dated July 12, 1863 AD.

Then Abu Jabal was appointed head of the Military Council in Egypt, then director of Gharbia, then Khedive Ismail granted him the rank of lieutenant general, then he was appointed a member of the Council of Rules until that council was abolished.

In the year 1283 AH, Abu Jabal assumed the position of Ma'moor 'Omoom al-Malahat, then the mission of the improvements of the Ibrahimiya Canal in Dairut was added to his responsibilities. He was then appointed governor of Cairo while the first mission remained in his charge. Then he was separated from it and appointed as a warden for collections of late funds in Upper Egypt. In the year 1291 AH, he was appointed a member of the Judgments Council, and in the following year he was appointed deputy of that council. Then in the following year he assumed the position of Secretary-General of the Egyptian Treasury, and on April 10, 1879, he was appointed President of the Judgments Council, and he remained in this position until he was retired on September 15. 1879.

When the Urabi Revolt broke out, Abu Jabal was one of its major opponents, and he accompanied Khedive Tawfiq to Alexandria, and after the attack on Alexandria, he accompanied Tawfiq to the Ras el-Tin Palace, but his health soon deteriorated after his return to Cairo, where he died on Jumada al-Thani 17, 1300 AH.

== Nickname ==
Abu Jabal was given this title in honor of his good performance in one of the battles of the Wahhabi wars. In one incident, the force he was leading was trapped in the mountain, and the enemy surrounded them from every direction. Ismail Pasha drew his sword and led his soldiers in a counterattack. Ibrahim Pasha was watching the fighting from a distance. Ismail Pasha was seriously injured in this battle, but it has been proven that with his soldiers until he was finally victorious, Ibrahim Pasha summoned him and thanked him for his valor and ordered his personal doctor to treat his wounds, and from that time he was nicknamed Abu Jabal.

== Honors ==
- Order of the Medjidie, second class (Ottoman Empire)
- Medal of Excellence (Ottoman Empire)
- Turkish Crimea Medal (Ottoman Empire)
- Order of Glory (Ottoman Empire)
- Order of Leopold (Belgium)
