= Siege of Silistria (1854) =

1854 battle of the Crimean War

- Part of the Crimean War
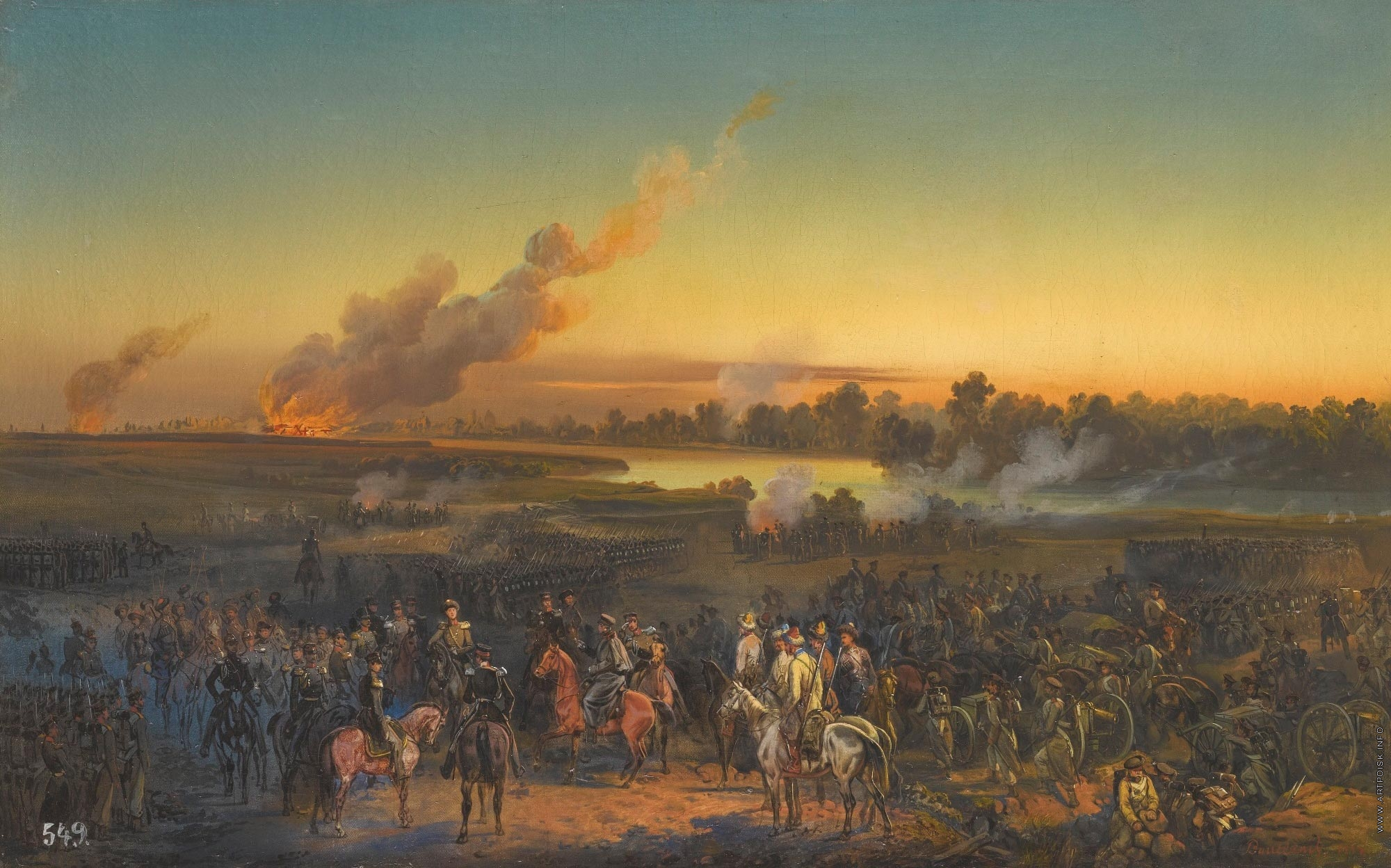
- Siege of Silistria by Bogdan Willewalde
| Date | 11 May – 23 June 1854 |
| Location | Silistria, Ottoman Bulgaria 44°7′9.01″N 27°15′40.9″E |
| Result | Ottoman victory |

Belligerents
| Ottoman Empire; (Ottoman Egypt) Eyalet of Egypt | Russian Empire |

Commanders and leaders
| (Ottoman Empire) Musa Pasha †; (Ottoman Empire) Robert Cannon (Behram Pasha); (United Kingdom of Great Britain and Ireland) Capt. James Butler (British officer) †; (United Kingdom of Great Britain and Ireland) Lt. Charles Nasmyth (British officer; acting commander); (Ottoman Egypt) Selim Fathi Pasha | (Russian Empire) Nicholas I; (Russian Empire) Ivan Paskevich; (Russian Empire) Mikhail Gorchakov; (Russian Empire) Karl Schilder †; (Russian Empire) Dmitry Selvan † |

Strength
| 12–18,000 men. (Garrison) | 50–90,000 men and 266 guns |

Casualties and losses
| 1,400 killed | 16,000 casualties; 10,000 killed; 6,000 wounded |
- Location of Silistria in present-day Bulgaria

The siege of Silistria, or siege of Silistra, was a key engagement in the Crimean War, fought from 11 May to 23 June 1854 between the Russian Empire and the Ottoman Empire in present-day Bulgaria. The Russian army, numbering up to 90,000 men with 266 guns, attempted to capture the Danubian fortress of Silistria as part of a broader strategy to outflank Ottoman defences and pre-empt an expected Allied landing at Varna. The garrison, 12,000 to 18,000 Ottoman troops and Egyptian auxiliaries, was bolstered by British military advisers and successfully withstood a six-week siege.

The operation was shaped by diplomatic and regional tensions. Russia hoped for a general Balkan uprising and misjudged the likelihood of Austrian or Serbian neutrality. Austria, concerned that a Russian advance might provoke unrest among its own Serb population, mobilised 280,000 troops along the Danube and warned Russia against crossing the river. At the same time, Anglo-French troops began arriving in Varna, and a joint Austrian–Ottoman convention granted Austria the right to occupy the Danubian Principalities of Wallachia and Moldavia.

Despite capturing key outworks and preparing a final assault, the Russians abruptly lifted the siege just hours before the planned storming of the citadel. Orders to retreat were issued by Field Marshal Ivan Paskevich following imperial instructions from Nicholas I of Russia, who had resisted calls for evacuation until faced with isolation and a growing Allied threat. The siege marked Russia's largest siege effort against an Ottoman fortress to date and its failure forced a withdrawal from the Danubian principalities, ending that phase of the war.

== Background ==
In early 1854, the Russian Empire sought to pressure the Ottoman government and destabilise its Balkan provinces by launching a military campaign south of the Danube. On 20 March, two Russian army corps crossed into Ottoman territory. In the east, a 50,000-strong force under General Alexander von Lüders advanced from Bessarabia into Dobruja, seizing several key positions between 23 and 29 March. By the beginning of April, Russian troops had reached the defensive line known as Trajan's Wall, located about 30 miles east of Silistria (now Silistra).

== Prelude ==
The central Russian army group under Prince Mikhail Dmitrievich Gorchakov moved toward Silistria, with the aim of capturing the fortress. Silistria, built upon ancient Roman foundations, had been developed by the Ottomans into a major fortress and trading hub. It featured a fortified inner citadel and an outer ring of ten modern forts. Russian war plans envisioned the occupation of major Ottoman strongholds in the region, including Silistria, Vidin, Rusçuk (now Ruse), Galatz (now Galați), and Brailov (now Brăila), as part of a wider effort to secure a foothold in the Balkans and block Allied intervention through the Black Sea coast. Contemporary accounts also noted that the Russian preparations in April included batteries positioned north of the Danube and a series of skirmishes aimed at encircling the fortress.

== Siege ==
The Ottoman garrison was composed largely of Albanian and Egyptian soldiers, a force of 12,000 men, commanded by Musa Pasha. A second Ottoman army of around 40,000 to 45,000 under Omar Pasha Ottoman Commander-in-Chief, remained stationed at Şumnu (now Shumen). (Note: Omar Pasha was originally a Serbian Orthodox Christian named Mihajlo Latas, who later converted to Islam and became a high-ranking Ottoman commander.)

The defenders were assisted by approximately six British officers, including Robert Cannon (Behram Pasha), Captain James Butler, and Lieutenant Charles Nasmyth. (Note: Nasmyth was also a war correspondent for The Times of London. His dispatches, written from April to June 1854, offered detailed coverage of the siege until his wounding and subsequent death.) Both Butler and Nasmyth, officers of the Ceylon Rifles and veterans of the East India Company army, arrived before the siege began and volunteered their services to the garrison. Another British officer present was Thomas Simmons, who served as the British commissioner attached to the Ottoman army. Prussian Colonel Grach, a former army engineer and specialist in entrenchments, also served on the Ottoman staff, advising on measures to strengthen the fortress's defences. Contemporary accounts emphasised the influence of these foreign officers. Captain Butler in particular left a detailed journal of the siege, describing daily skirmishes and expressing concern that the Ottoman troops had no regular routine for alarms and showed weak discipline. Historian James J. Reid argues that Butler's testimony reflected long-standing structural problems in Ottoman military practice, particularly the unreliability of sentry duty, which had been observed in earlier campaigns and would persist into the Russo–Turkish War of 1877.

The Russian vanguard reached Silistria on 5 April. General Karl Schilder, who had taken the fortress in 1829, resumed command, this time accompanied by Lieutenant-Colonel Eduard Totleben, responsible for siege works and fortification. Although initial Russian plans envisioned a swift encirclement, they failed to completely isolate the town, allowing Ottoman forces to continue resupply operations. On 22 April, Field Marshal Prince Ivan Paskevich assumed command of the Danube campaign and arrived from Warsaw to Bucharest. Although entrusted with overall authority, Paskevich remained sceptical of the campaign's prospects, later urging a withdrawal in view of mounting pressure from Austria and signs of Allied mobilisation. By May the numbers of defenders rose to 18,000 after reinforcements arrived, while the Russian forces reached 90,000.

On 28 May, the Ottoman garrison launched a sally against Russian lines, prompting a counter-assault on Arab Tabia, a key southern redoubt in the Silistra fortress complex. Russian forces briefly captured the position but, lacking reinforcements, were forced to withdraw after suffering heavy casualties. General Selvan was killed during the fighting. Russian casualties included 22 officers and more than 900 enlisted men killed or wounded. Ottoman reports recorded 68 dead and 121 wounded. On 2 June, Musa Pasha was struck by shrapnel and fatally wounded while preparing for prayers.; British officers Butler and Nasmyth temporarily assumed leadership of the garrison. Butler died after being shot in the head, (Note: 27-year-old Butler, the first British soldier to be killed in the war, became known in the British press as "The Hero of Silistra".) Nasmyth took command and started re-organise the defence. In reports to Nicholas I, Paskevich credited the defenders' tenacity to the strategic input of foreign officers.

On 10 June, Paskevich reported being shaken by a nearby shell burst, after which he retired to Warsaw, officially due to health reasons. Command passed to General Gorchakov. Three days later, Schilder was severely wounded and died shortly afterward. On 20 June, Arab Tabia was recaptured by Russian forces.

On 21 June, final preparations were underway for an all-out assault on the main fortress, scheduled for 4 am Yet only hours before the operation, Gorchakov received orders, originating from Paskevich on 13 June and endorsed by the Tsar, to abandon the siege:

The siege of Silistria must be raised if the fortress is not yet taken at the receipt of this letter.

— Nicholas I of Russia to Field Marshal Paskevich, 13 June 1854,

The sudden withdrawal was triggered by multiple strategic concerns: Austria had signed a convention with the Ottomans on 14 June granting it rights to occupy the Danubian Principalities, while Allied forces were now massing at Varna, with 50,000 French and 20,000 British troops in theatre. On 24 June, the Russian army withdrew across the Danube, dismantling the pontoon bridge behind them. The Ottomans did not pursue. Russian losses during the siege are estimated at 2,500 dead and 1,783 wounded. (Note: Among those present in the last days of the siege was the young Russian officer Leo Tolstoy, then serving as an orderly.)

== Aftermath ==
Although the defenders of Silistria held firm, most scholars agree that the lifting of the siege was ultimately driven less by battlefield outcomes than by external diplomatic and military pressures. Austria had concentrated a large force, reportedly up to 280,000 troops, along the borders of Wallachia and Moldavia, and had warned Russia against further advances across the Danube.

By late June, Allied reinforcements began arriving in strength. On 27 June 1854, 30,000 British troops landed at Varna, followed by 12,000 French soldiers under Vice-Admiral Bruat three days later. Combined with Austria's decision to sign a convention with the Ottomans allowing it to temporarily occupy the Danubian Principalities, these developments left Russia diplomatically isolated. The Russian high command, under mounting pressure, ordered a general withdrawal. To avoid the appearance of defeat, the retreat was officially presented as a "strategic withdrawal".

Following the evacuation, Emperor Nicholas I accepted the Austro-Ottoman occupation of Wallachia and Moldavia, effectively ending Russia's military presence south of the Danube and bringing the Danubian phase of the Crimean War to a close. With the Russian threat receding, Ottoman forces under Omar Pasha crossed the Danube and advanced into Wallachia, where they engaged Russian forces at Giurgevo in early July 1854.

== Notes ==
- ́Ágoston, G.A.; Masters, B.A. (2010). Encyclopedia of the Ottoman Empire. Facts on File Library of World History. Facts On File, Incorporated. ISBN 978-1-4381-1025-7.
- Badem, Candan (2010). "The" Ottoman Crimean War: (1853 - 1856). BRILL. ISBN 978-90-04-18205-9.
- Bartlett, Rosamund (1 June 2018). Tolstoy: A Russian Life. HMH. ISBN 978-0-547-54587-5.
- Cuvalo, A. (2010). The A to Z of Bosnia and Herzegovina. G - Reference, Information and Interdisciplinary Subjects Series. Scarecrow Press. ISBN 978-0-8108-7647-7.
- The Edinburgh Medical and Surgical Journal. Arch. Constable & Comp. 1858.
- Harris, Stephen M. (7 December 2018). British Military Intelligence in the Crimean War, 1854–1856. Routledge. ISBN 978-1-135-24493-4.
- Heathcote, T. A. (1999). The British Field Marshals, 1763-1997: A Biographical Dictionary. Leo Cooper. ISBN 978-0-85052-696-7.
- Hötte, H.H.A.; Demeter, G.; Turbucs, D. (2017). Atlas of Southeast Europe: Geopolitics and History. Volume Three: 1815–1926. Handbook of Oriental Studies. Section 1 The Near and Middle East. Brill. ISBN 978-90-04-36181-2.
- Jaques, T.; Showalter, D.E. (2007). Dictionary of Battles and Sieges: P-Z. Dictionary of Battles and Sieges: A Guide to 8,500 Battles from Antiquity Through the Twenty-first Century. Greenwood Press. ISBN 978-0-313-33539-6.
- Kennedy, David (4 May 2023). Well Met! Friends and Travelling Companions of Rev. Thomas Bowles: Journals of Travels in Egypt, Petra and the Near East, 1854. Archaeopress Publishing Ltd. ISBN 978-1-80327-484-3.
- Macphail, Rosslyn (30 December 2024). From Fighting Napoleon to the Scottish Military Academy: The Life of Captain John Orr. Pen and Sword Military. ISBN 978-1-3990-3448-7.
- Ponting, Clive (15 February 2011). The Crimean War: The Truth Behind the Myth. Random House. ISBN 978-1-4070-9311-6.
- Reid, J.J. (2000). Crisis of the Ottoman Empire: Prelude to Collapse 1839-1878. Quellen und Studien zur Geschichte des östlichen Europa. F. Steiner. ISBN 978-3-515-07687-6.
- Russell, W.H. (1865). General Todleben's History of the Defence of Sebastopol, 1854-5: A Review. Tinsley Brothers.
- Small, H. (2018). The Crimean War: Europe's Conflict with Russia. History Press. ISBN 978-0-7509-8742-4.
- Studii și materiale de istorie modernă (in Romanian). Editura Academiei Republicii Populare Romîne. 1999.
- Sweetman, J. (2014). Crimean War. Essential Histories. Taylor & Francis. ISBN 978-1-135-97650-7.
- Baumgart, Winfried (9 January 2020). The Crimean War: 1853–1856. Bloomsbury Publishing. ISBN 978-1-350-08345-5.
