= Battle of Eupatoria =

1855 battle of the Crimean War

- Part of the Crimean War
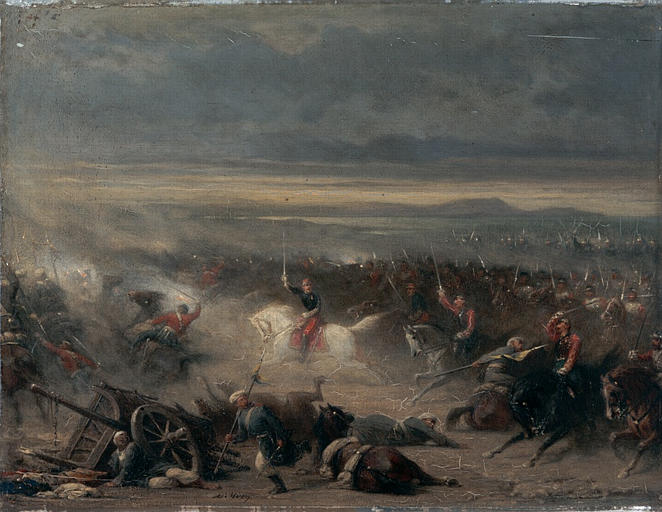
- Battle of Eupatoria by Adolphe Yvon
Date	17 February 1855 (Note: All dates are New Style)
Location	Eupatoria, Russian Empire 45°12′42.13″N 33°22′52.38″E
Result	Ottoman victory

Belligerents
Ottoman Empire; Khedivate of Egypt; French Empire; United Kingdom	Russia

Commanders and leaders
(Ottoman Empire) Omar Pasha (Ottoman Empire) Iskender Pasha (Ottoman Empire) Muhlis Pasha; Selim Pasha † (Ottoman Empire) Behram Pasha (France) A.-O.-M. d'Allonville	(Russia) Stepan Khrulev (Russia) Mikhail Gorchakov

Strength
31,600 Turkish infantry, cavalry, and artillery 1,000 Tatars; 276 French Sailors; 34 Cannons; 4 British steamers 1 Ottoman frigate 1 French frigate	17,924 Russian infantry, cavalry, and artillery 634 Greek volunteers 325 Cossacks; 108 Cannons

Casualties and losses
91 killed 286 wounded	168 killed 583 wounded 18 missing

The Battle of Eupatoria (Russian: Штурм Евпатории, lit. 'Storm of Eupatoria'; Turkish: Gözleve Muharebesi) occurred on 17 February 1855 during the Crimean War when the army of the Russian Empire unsuccessfully attempted to capture the Crimean port city of Eupatoria held by the forces of the Ottoman Empire.

== Background ==
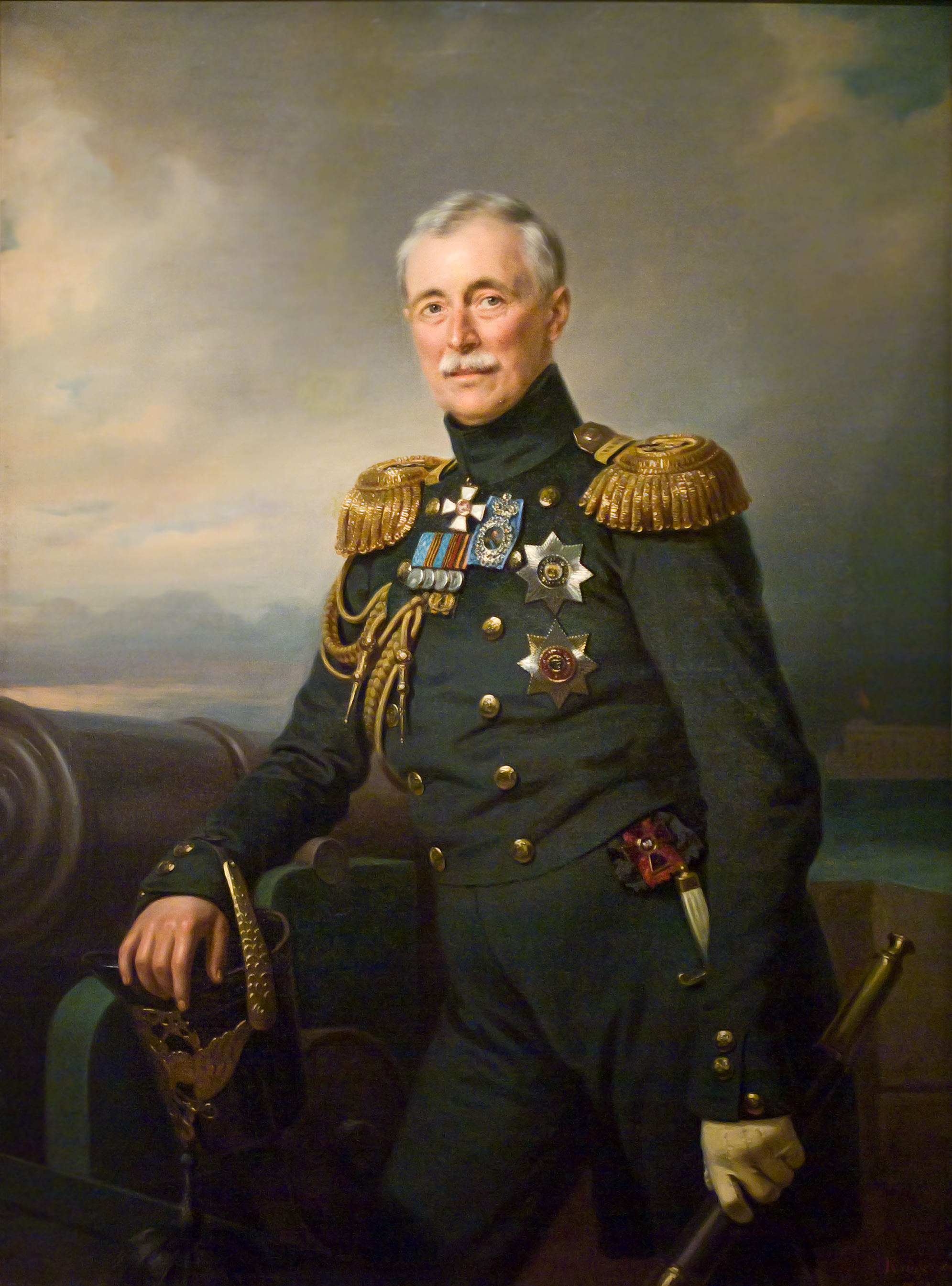
Prince Alexander Menshikov

On 28 March 1854, the United Kingdom and France formally entered the Crimean War as allies of the Ottoman Empire by declaring war against Russia. In September 1854, Allied forces landed on the coast of the Crimean Peninsula as a part of a military offensive to attack and capture Russia's primary Black Sea naval base at Sevastopol. By mid-October, the Allies had surrounded Sevastopol and put the port city under siege. During the fall and winter of 1854-1855, the belligerents reinforced their armies on Crimea. While the Russians brought troops to Crimea overland from the mainland, the Allies brought in their reinforcements by means of transports across the Black Sea with Eupatoria being one of two major disembarkation points for the Allies on Crimea.

In December 1854, Tsar Nicholas I wrote to Prince Alexander Menshikov, the Russian Commander-in-chief for the Crimean War, demanding that the reinforcements being sent to Crimea be put to a useful purpose and expressing a fear that enemy landings at Eupatoria were a danger. The Tsar feared rightfully so that additional Allied forces at Eupatoria, located 75 kilometers north of Sebastopol, could sever Crimea from Russia at the Isthmus of Perekop cutting-off the flow of communications, materials, and reinforcements.

Shortly thereafter, Prince Menshikov informed his officers on Crimea that Tsar Nicholas insisted that Eupatoria be captured and destroyed if it could not be held. To conduct the attack, Menshikov added that he had been authorized to use the reinforcements currently en route to Crimea including the 8th Infantry Division. Menshikov then acted to select a commanding officer for the attack to which his first and second choices both declined the assignment, making excuses to avoid leading an offensive that neither believed would have a successful outcome. Ultimately, Menshikov selected Lieutenant General Stepan Khrulev, an artillery staff officer described as willing to "do exactly what you tell him," as the officer in overall charge of the undertaking.

== Strength and deployment ==
To prepare for the attack, Khrulev inspected Eupatoria by means of numerous reconnaissance missions. In the opinion of the Russian commander, the town was strongly fortified as it was surrounded by a continuous earthen wall bordered by a ditch. There were some portions of the wall, however, that seemed unfinished and under construction. Along the walls were gun batteries supporting 34 cannons. Given its position bordering the shore of the Black Sea to the south, the city was also protected by the guns of Allied warships in the harbor. Outside the fortified walls, the landscape was largely barren as the need for firewood had resulted in the destruction of most of the surrounding buildings and structures.

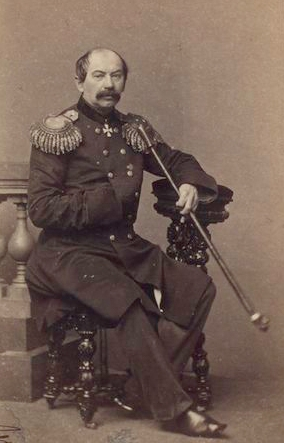
General Stepan Khrulev

Inside the city there were approximately 33,000 men including nearly five Turkish infantry divisions, two Turkish cavalry squadrons led by Muhlis Pasha, 1,000 Tatars, 276 French sailors, and a small French infantry detachment. The Turkish forces at Eupatoria were under the command of Omar Pasha an experienced military officer.

To capture the city, Khrulev planned to attack in three columns. The primary thrust would be in the center at the north wall where the impact of a potential naval bombardment would be less. In order to draw the defenders away from the center, Khrulev would use the other two columns to attack on the flanking walls of the city. The flanking attack on the left would begin first followed by the flanking attack on the right. If the plan went well, the focus of the defenders would shift to the flanks and the Russians would move to break through at the center.

Each of the three columns was to be composed of approximately 5,000 foot soldiers and 36 cannons. The columns charged with conducting the flanking attacks were also to be supported by over 2,200 cavalry troopers. Two dragoon regiments with a light horse battery and a brigade of lancers were to be held behind the lines in reserve. To provide cover for the artillery and their crews, 76 wooden epaulements were to be built before the battle and moved to a position 500 yards from the town walls when the battle began. Khrulev's total deployment for the battle was planned to include 22 infantry battalions, 24 cavalry squadrons, and five Cossack sotnias, a total of nearly 19,000 men.

== Battle ==
In the evening of 16 February, Khrulev put his plan into action, quietly moving his forces to positions approximately 3½ kilometers from the walls of Eupatoria. At that point, lines of riflemen and the Cossacks were moved to the front as forward posts while the remainder of the men silently began to build the epaulements for the gun batteries. The darkness of the night and the contour of the land hid their activities from the Turkish pickets.

As dawn approached, Khrulev mounted his horse and personally led the column on the left forward to the point of the first attack, approximately 1,300 meters from Eupatoria's walls. Following immediately behind Khrulev, the company commanders led their battalions forward. As they moved forward, however, they were observed by the Tatars on watch who retreated toward the city sounding the alarm. Although, Khrulev planned his offensive as a surprise attack, the Turks were aware that an attack was forthcoming and were already on the parapets.

At approximately 6 am, the first shots were fired when the Turks began a general cannonade supported by rifle fire. As quickly as they could respond, the Russians began their own artillery fire. For about an hour both sides continued to bombard each other. During this time, Khrulev reinforced his column on the left, advanced his artillery to within 500 meters of the city walls, and began to concentrate his cannon fire on the Turkish center.

Although the Turkish guns were of a larger caliber, the Russian artillery began to have some success in the cannonade. Shortly thereafter when the Turkish fire slackened, the Russians began to advance five battalions of infantry toward the city walls on the left. A part of this force included a battalion of Greek volunteers who had joined forces with the Russians early in February. Using the ruins of a cemetery, the infantry battalions advanced to a position 400 meters from the ditch which served as a defensive belt in front of the city walls. Equipped with fascines, scaling ladders, and other items, the infantry battalions advanced quickly to the ditch in a final assault all the while in a crossfire of canister shot and rifle fire from the walls of the city plus bombardment from the Allied warships in the harbor.

At this point, the attack effectively stopped. The ditches were filled with water at such a depth that the attackers quickly found themselves unable to scale the walls. After numerous failed attempts to cross the ditches and ascend their ladders to the top of the walls, the Russians were forced to retreat and seek shelter back at grounds of the cemetery. Seeing their enemy's difficulties, the Turks took advantage of the situation and sent a battalion of infantry and two squadrons of cavalry out of the city to pursue the Russians as they fell back.

Almost immediately, Khrulev deemed the ditches as an obstacle that could not be overcome and came to the conclusion that Eupatoria could not be taken given its defenses and complement of defenders. When asked with regard to the next steps, Khrulev ordered his forces to retreat. The order was communicated to the commanders of the right and center columns, neither of which had engaged in the fight to the degree as the effort of the left column.

Although many of the Russian commanders desired to continue the attack, they were overruled by Khrulev and an orderly retreat was begun at about 10 am that morning. Khrulev led his defeated force to a defensive position in the hills to the east and formed them up into three columns. Omar Pasha sent a force of infantry and cavalry in pursuit, but chose only to observe their activities.

The Russian casualties were almost twice as great as those of the Turkish defenders. The Russians suffered 168 killed, 583 wounded, and 18 missing. The Turkish casualties were 91 killed and 286 wounded. Among the Ottoman dead was General Selim-Pasha.

== Aftermath ==
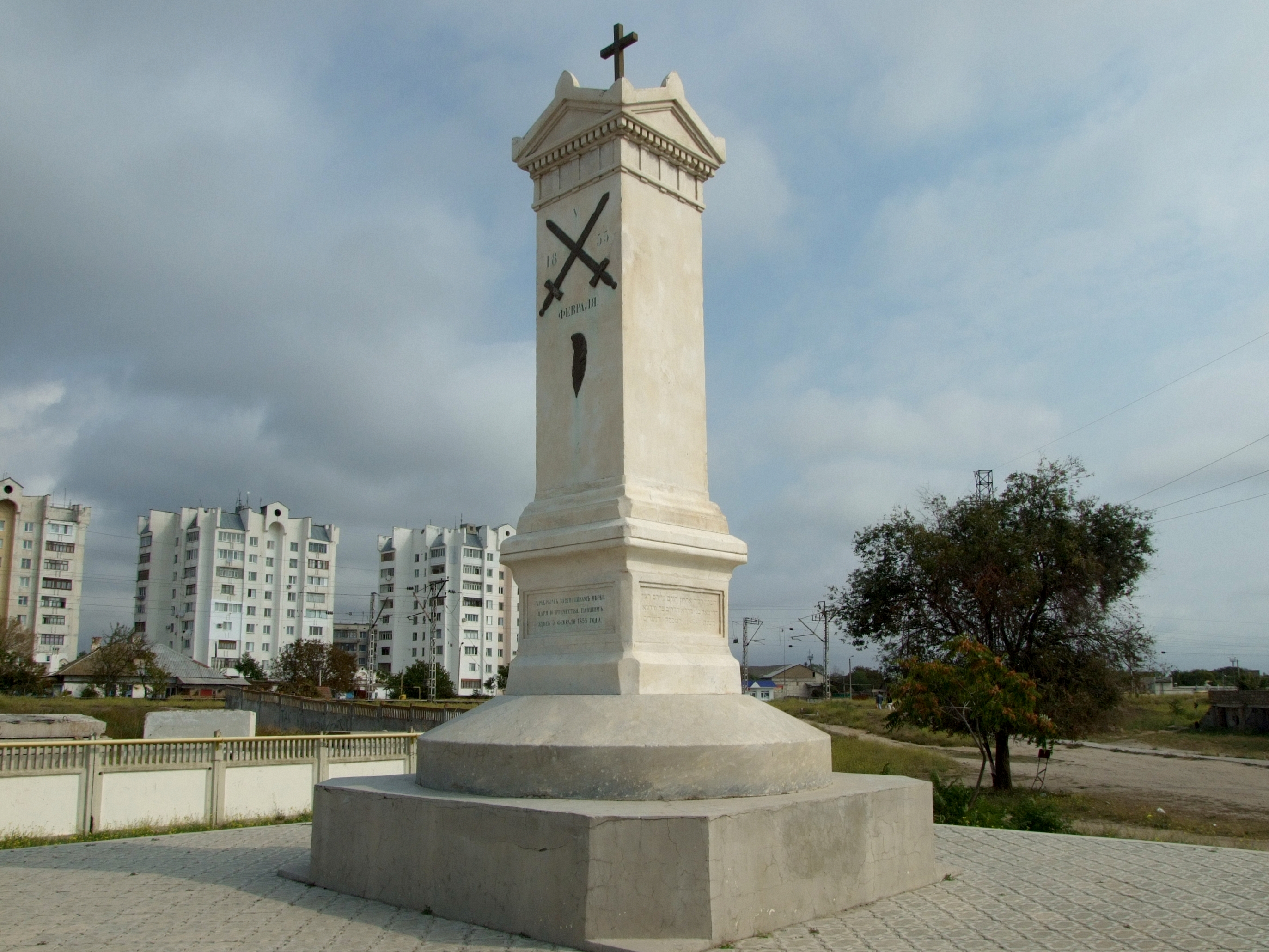
Crimean War Monument at the battlefield in Eupatoria

When the news of the defeat reached St. Petersburg, Tsar Nicholas was extremely disappointed and saddened. Already ill, Tsar Nicholas' spirit seemed broken and he died shortly thereafter on 2 March 1855. Succeeding his father, Tsar Alexander II dismissed Khrulev and replaced Prince Menshikov as the Commander-in-chief of the Russian forces for the Crimean War.

Although there was sentiment that the tyrant was dead and that the war would soon end, Tsar Alexander did not seek an immediate peace. Strategically, the battle of Eupatoria confirmed that Allied command of the Black Sea would ensure that the threat to the Russian flank on Crimea would remain for the duration of hostilities. For the Allies, possession of Eupatoria also meant that the investment of Sevastopol remained a viable option.

== General references ==
- Blake, R. L. V. ffrench, The Crimean War (Sphere Books; London: 1973)
