= Juma-Jami Mosque =

Sunni mosque in Yevpatoria, Crimea

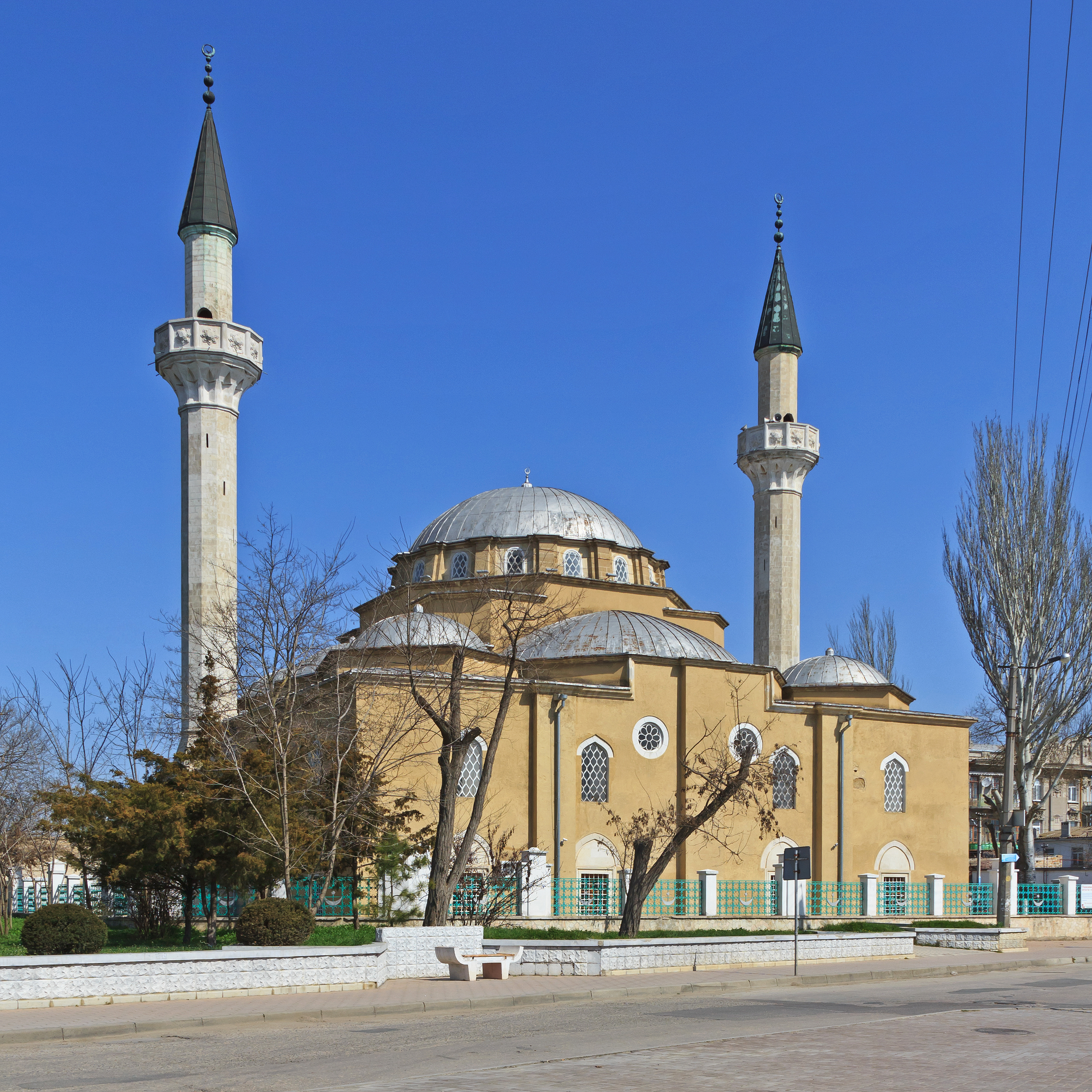

Religion
- Affiliation: Islam
- Rite: Sunni
- Status: Active

Location
- Location: Yevpatoria
- Interactive map of Juma-Jami Mosque
- Territory: (Autonomous Republic of Crimea) AR Crimea (de jure) (Autonomous Republic of Crimea) Republic of Crimea (de facto)
- Coordinates: 45°11′45″N 33°22′38″E

Architecture
- Architect: Mimar Sinan
- Type: Mosque
- Style: Ottoman architecture
- Completed: 1564

Specifications
- Direction of façade: North
- Dome height (outer): 20 meters
- Dome dia. (outer): 6 m (20 ft)
- Minaret: 2
- Minaret height: 35 meters
- Materials: Limestone

Immovable Monument of National Significance of Ukraine
- Official name: Мечеть Джума-Джамі (Cuma Cami Mosque)
- Type: Architecture
- Reference no.: 010044

The Juma-Jami Mosque, (Ukrainian: Мечеть Джума-Джамі; Crimean Tatar: Cuma Cami; Russian: Мечеть Джума-Джами; Turkish: Cuma Han Camii) also known as the Friday Mosque, is located in Yevpatoria, Crimea. Built between 1552 and 1564, it is a mosque designed by the Ottoman architect Mimar Sinan.

== History ==
The Juma-Jami is the largest mosque of Crimea and was founded by Khan Devlet I Giray in 1552. The Khan commissioned Istanbul architect Mimar Sinan (1489–1588) to build the mosque. Sinan was the chief architect of the Ottoman Empire. He designed the Sinan Pasha Mosque and the Şehzade Mosque in Istanbul. Construction of the Juma-Jami Mosque was a long process. At the time, Mimar Sinan was busy with construction of the Süleymaniye Mosque, in Istanbul, which was also plagued by financial difficulties due to money being spent on a war with Ivan the Terrible.

The mosque continued to be embellished and improved over time. From 1740 to 1743, the mosque was rebuilt and the main building was restored; from 1758 to 1769, the western facade of the mosque was decorated with paintings.

== Photos ==
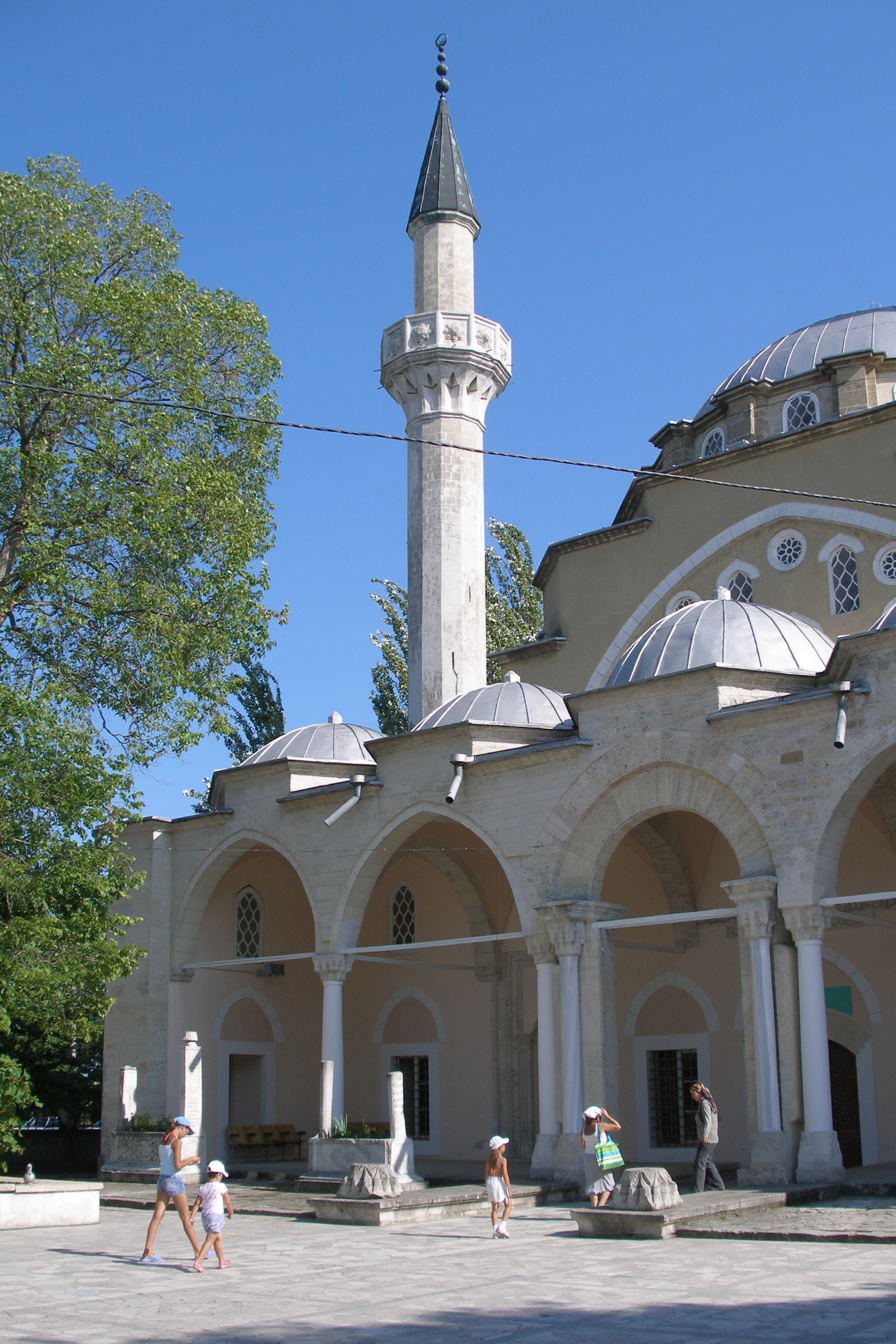
Main entrance to the Juma-Jami Mosque

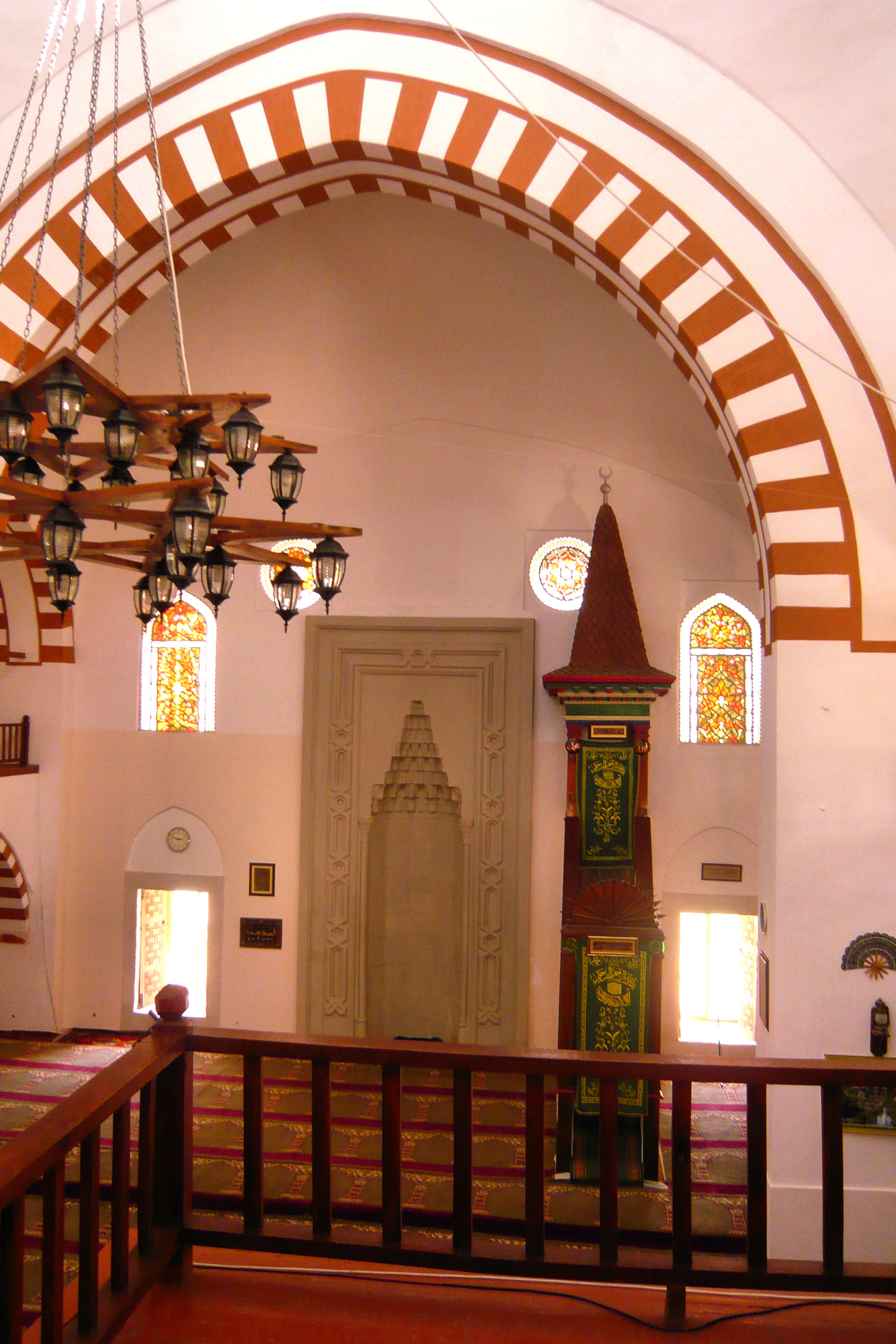

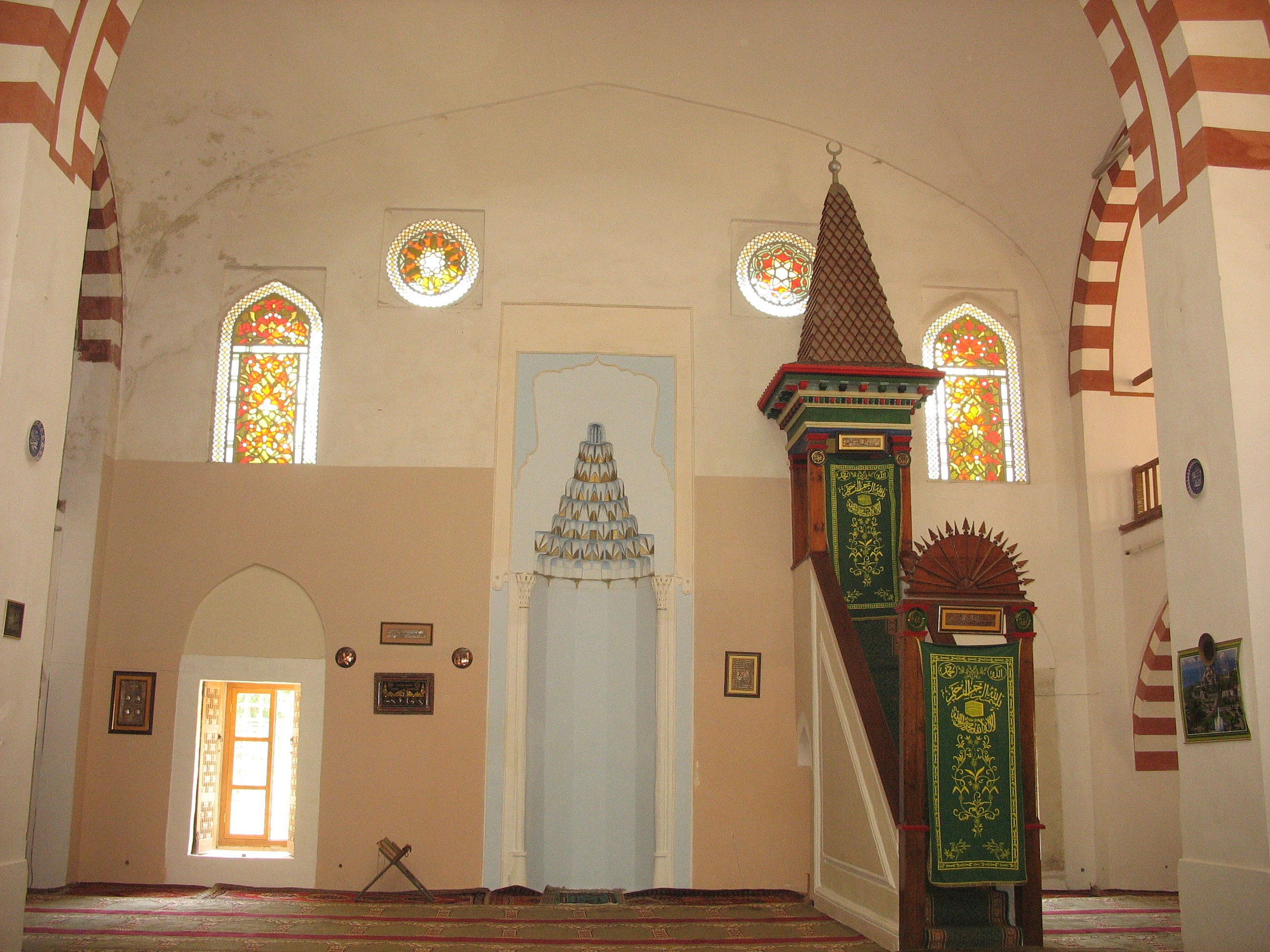

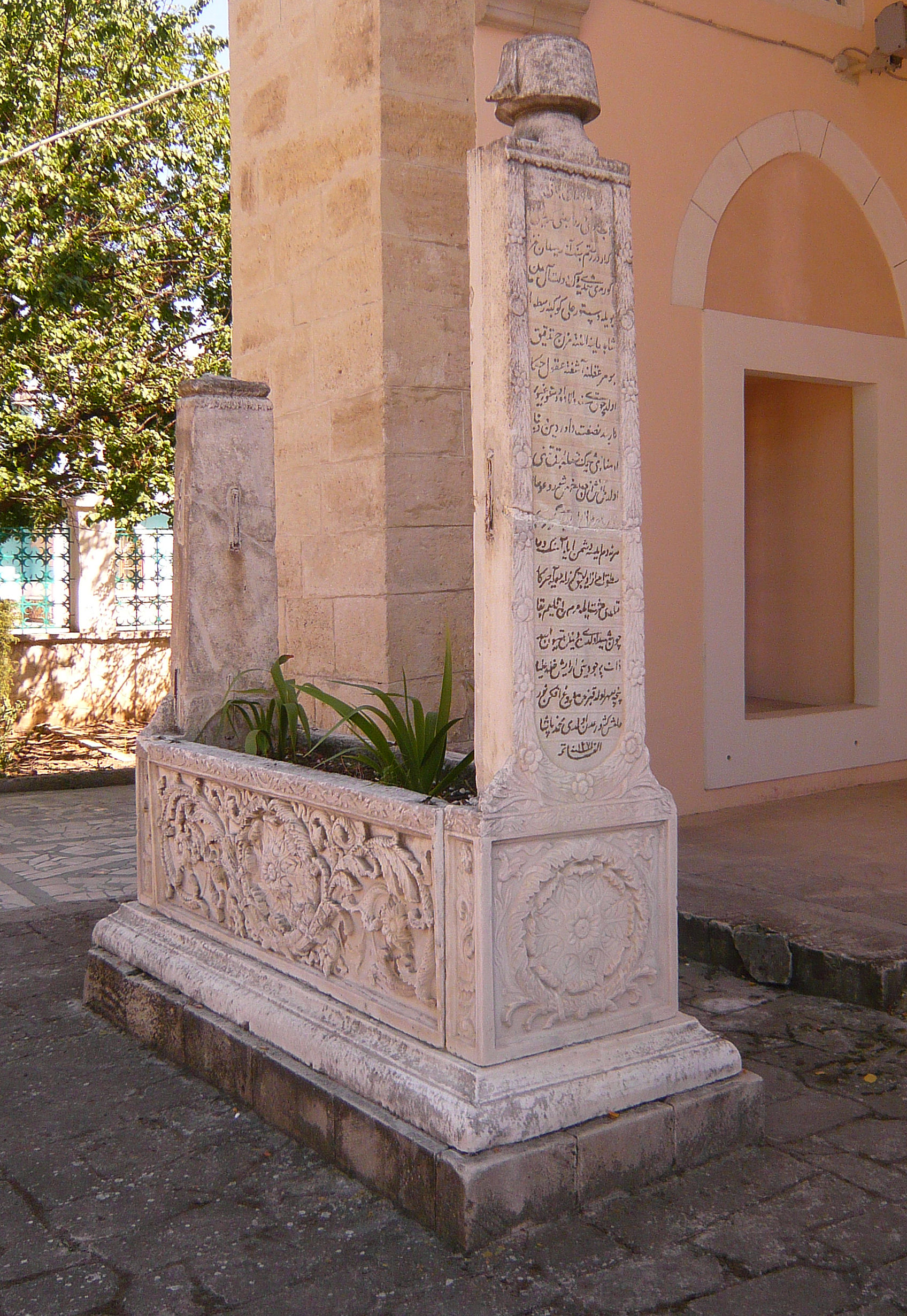

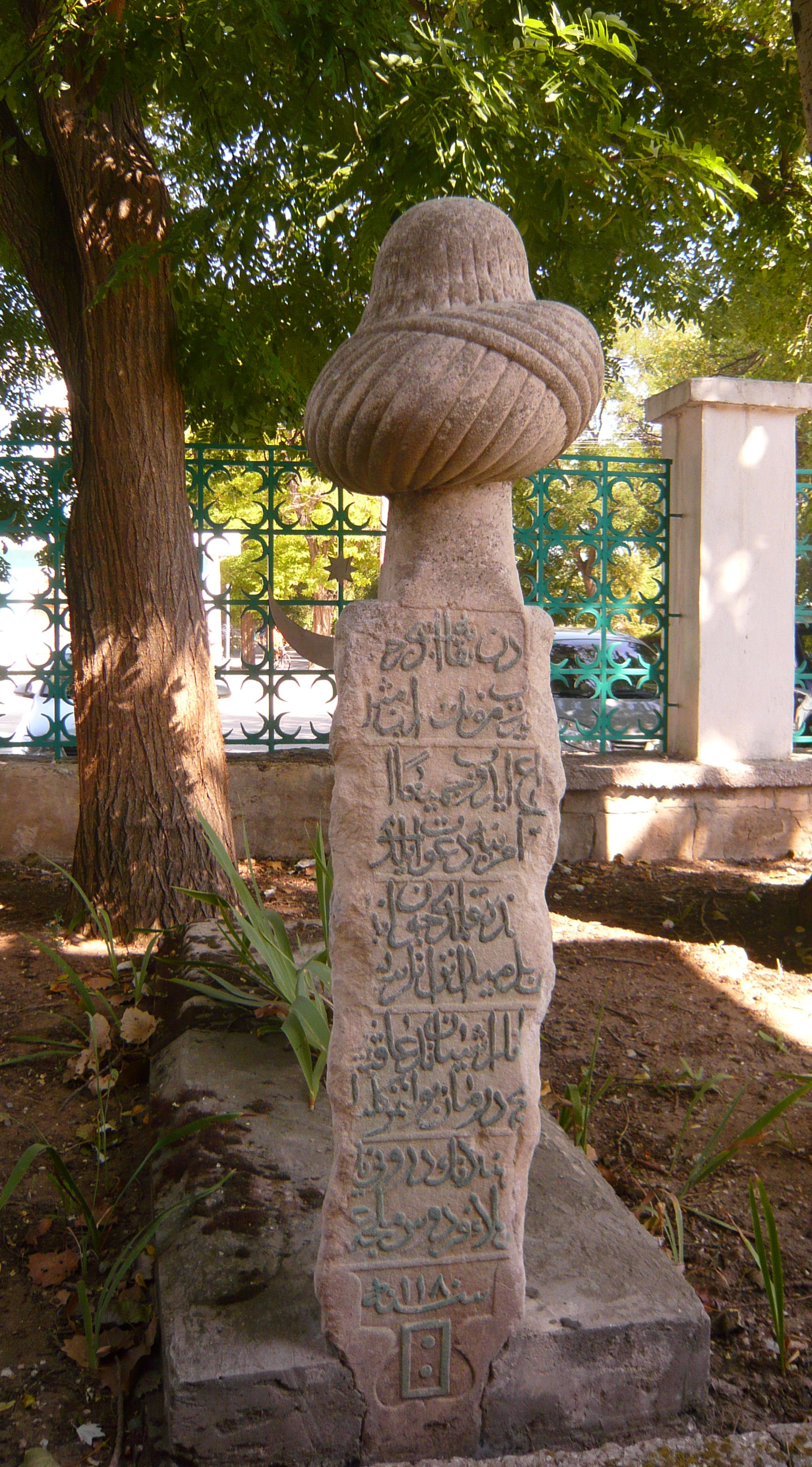

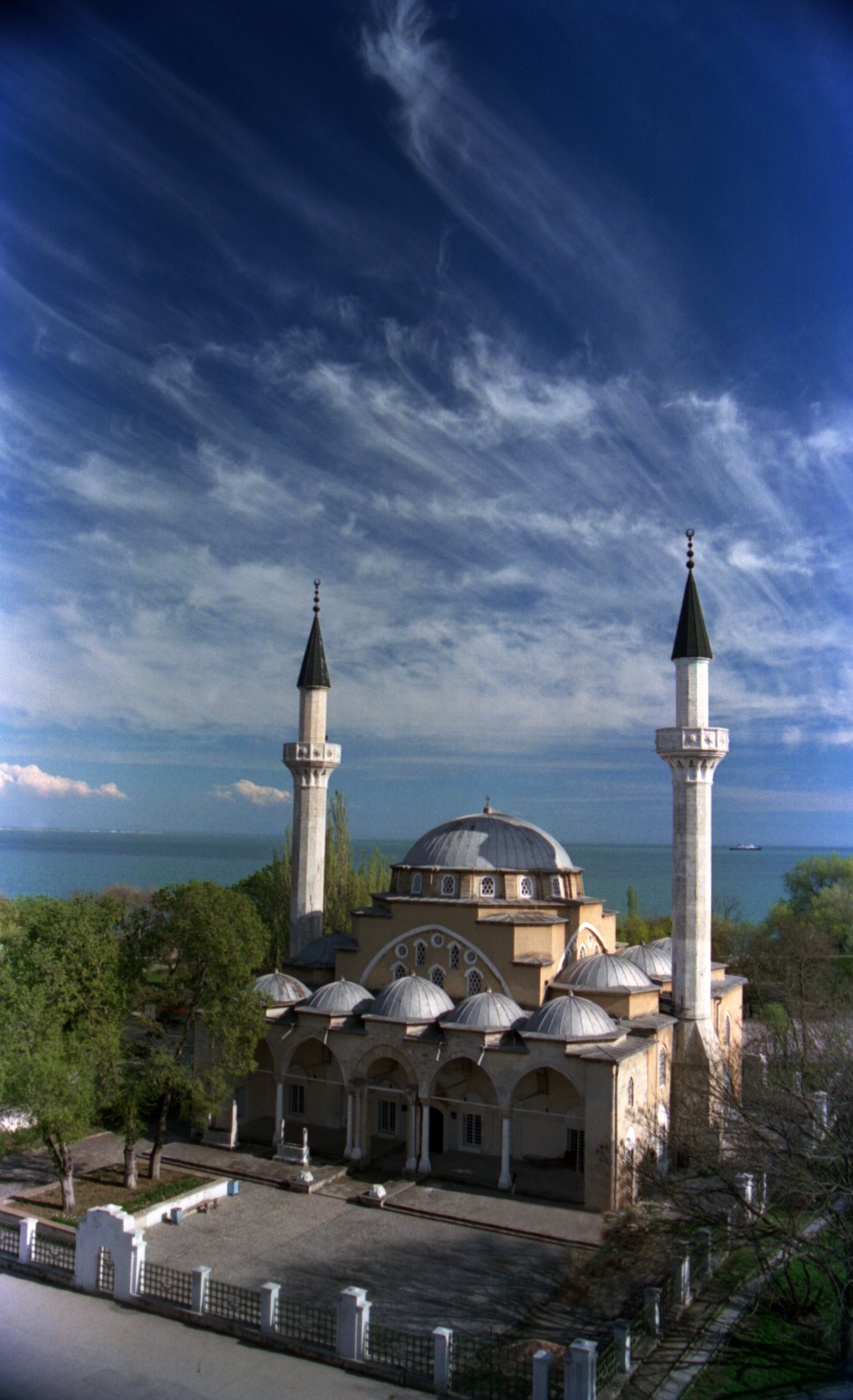

== See also ==
- Religion in Crimea
- List of mosques in Europe
