= Zouaves at the Malakoff =

Painting by Horace Vernet

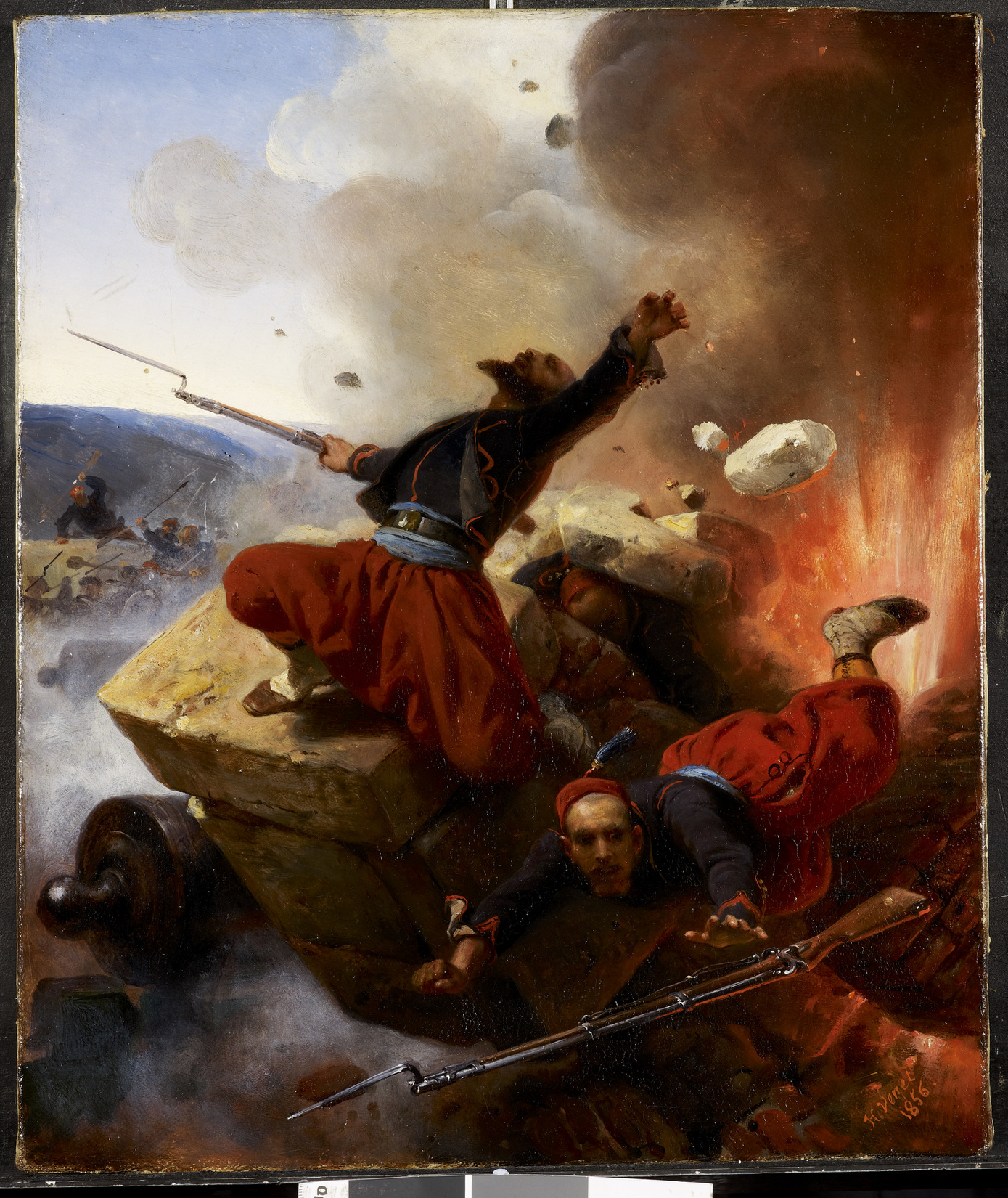
- Artist: Horace Vernet
- Year: 1856
- Type: Oil on canvas, history painting
- Dimensions: 39.7 cm × 33.9 cm (15.6 in × 13.3 in)
- Location: Royal Collection

Zouaves at the Malakoff is an 1856 military history painting by the French artist Horace Vernet. It features a scene from the Crimean War during the Battle of Malakoff, the final storming of the Malakoff Redoubt on 8 September 1855 that brought an end the Siege of Sevastopol. A group of French Zouaves are shown during the assault on the Russian defences.

Although Vernet had not witnessed the actual storming of the Malakoff, he had visited the siege lines in 1854. The painting was acquired by Queen Victoria as a Christmas present for her husband Prince Albert in 1857 and remains in the Royal Collection today. A mezzotint was produced based on the painting by Adolphe Gautier. Vernet returned to produce a larger painting based on the subject The Capture of the Malakoff Tower.

== Bibliography ==
- Godfrey, Sima. The Crimean War and Cultural Memory: The War France Won and Forgot. University of Toronto Press, 2023.
- Harkett, Daniel & Hornstein, Katie (ed.) Horace Vernet and the Thresholds of Nineteenth-Century Visual Culture. Dartmouth College Press, 2017.
- Lambert, David. Soldiers of Uncertain Rank: The West India Regiments in British Imperial Culture. Cambridge University Press, 2024.
- Thoma, Julia. The Final Spectacle: Military Painting under the Second Empire, 1855-1867. Walter de Gruyter, 2019.
