= Malakhov =

Malakhov (Russian: Малахов) is a Russian family name derived from the Biblical name of Malachi. Alternative spellings include Malakov and Malakoff. The name may refer to:

== People ==
Listed alphabetically by given name

- Aimable Pélissier, 1st Duc de Malakoff (1794-1864), Marshal of France
- Alice Malakhov (born 2008), Canadian actress
- Andrey Malakhov (born 1972), Russian television presenter
- George Malakov (1928–1979), Ukrainian artist
- Igor Malakhov (born 1979), Russian football player
- Ilya Malakov (born 1990), Russian theater and film actor
- Ivan Malakhov (born 1953), Russian politician
- Mikhail Fedorovich Malakhov (born 1946), Kazakh judge
- Mikhail Pavlovich Malakhov (1781–1842), Russian architect
- Vladimir Malakhov (chess player) (born 1980), Russian chess player
- Vladimir Malakhov (dancer) (born 1968), Russian dancer
- Vladimir Malakhov (ice hockey) (born 1968), Russian ice hockey player
- Yevgeni Malakhov (born 1982), Russian football player

== Places ==
=== United States ===
- Malakoff, California, a former settlement in Nevada County
  - Malakoff Diggins State Historic Park, a state park
- Malakoff, Texas, a city in Henderson County

=== Elsewhere ===
- Malakhov Kurgan, Sevastopol, Crimea
- Malakoff, Ontario, Canada
- Malakoff, Hauts-de-Seine, France
- Malakoff, New Brunswick, Canada
- Malakoff, Moss County, Norway

== Ships ==
- SS Malakoff, a cargo steamship, wrecked in 1929
- Malakoff, French Navarin-class minesweeper, launched in 1918

== Other uses ==
- Avenue de Malakoff, a street in the 16th arrondissement of Paris
- Battle of Malakoff, an 1855 battle during the Siege of Sevastopol in the Crimean War
- Malakoff (food), fried cheese balls or sticks from Western Switzerland
- Malakoff (power company), a Malaysian company
- Malakoff Tower, in Recife Antigo, Recife, Brazil
