= The Malakoff Gorge =

Painting by Adolphe Yvon

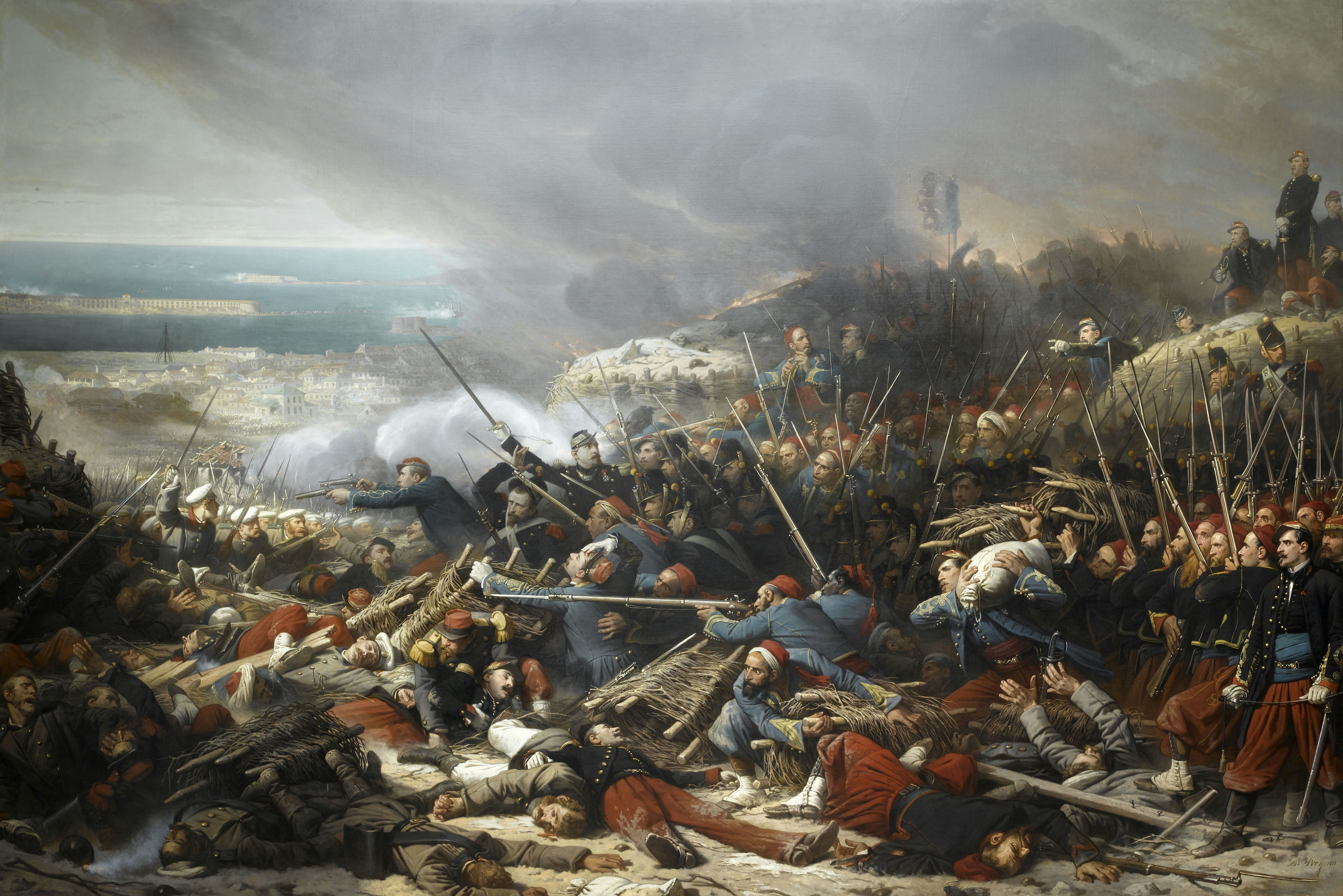
- Artist: Adolphe Yvon
- Year: 1859
- Type: Oil on canvas, history painting
- Dimensions: 500 cm × 750 cm (200 in × 300 in)
- Location: Palace of Versailles, Versailles

The Malakoff Gorge (French Combat dans la gorge de Malakoff) is an 1859 military history painting by the French artist Adolphe Yvon. It depicts a scene from the Battle of Malakoff during Siege of Sevastopol in 1855. It shows soldiers of the French Army advancing to clash with Russian forces defending the city on 8 September 1855. The harbour of the city can be seen in the background. Troops depicted in the foreground include Algerian Tirailleurs and French Zouaves. Several portraits of real figures are included such as Joseph Vinoy, Félix Douay and Emmanuel Félix de Wimpffen.

Yvon produced three notable paintings displaying different moments of the storming of the city, having previously displayed The Capture of the Malakoff Tower. He was a leading painter or military art during the Second French Empire of Napoleon III, whose government commissioned the work. This painting was displayed at the Salon of 1859, today both the painting and a smaller replica are part of the collection of the Museum of French History at the Palace of Versailles

== See also ==
- The Capture of the Malakoff Tower, an 1858 painting by Horace Vernet

== Bibliography ==
- Hornstein, Katie. Picturing War in France, 1792–1856. Yale University Press, 2018.
- Thoma, Julia. The Final Spectacle: Military Painting under the Second Empire, 1855–1867. Walter de Gruyter, 2019.
