= Napoleon III at the Battle of Solferino =

Painting by Ernest Meissonier

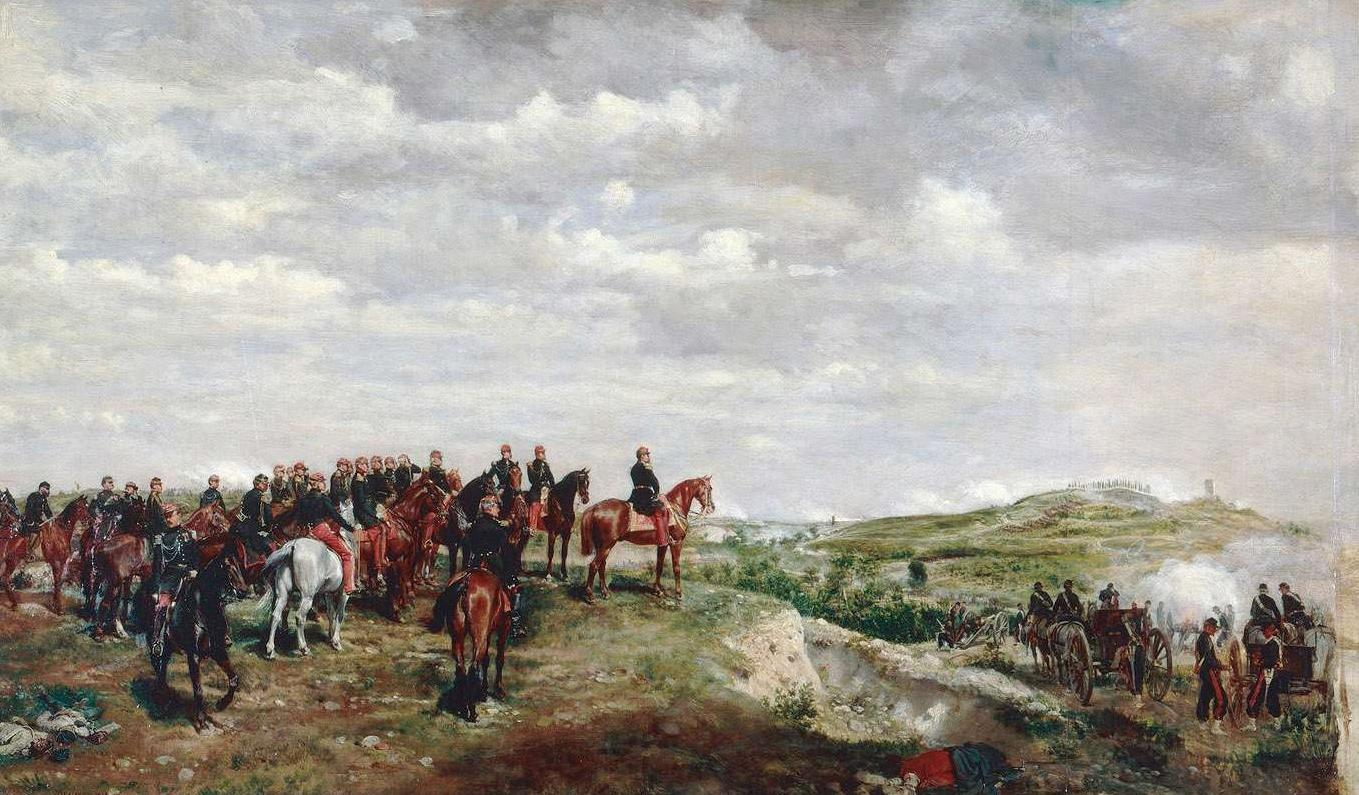
- Artist: Ernest Meissonier
- Year: 1863
- Type: Oil on panel, history painting
- Dimensions: 43.5 cm × 76 cm (17.1 in × 30 in)
- Location: Château de Compiègne; Oise

Napoleon III at the Battle of Solferino is an oil on panel history painting by the French artist Ernest Meissonier, from 1863.

== History and description ==
It depicts the Battle of Solferino fought on 24 June 1859 during the Second Italian War of Independence.The French Emperor Napoleon III is shown at the head of his armies during the significant victory over the Austrians. The Emperor is shown on horseback on the crest of a hill surrounded by his senior commanders.

The painting was produced as part of a wave of paintings designed to glorify France's recent military achievements and draw comparisons to the reign of the emperor's uncle, Napoleon. The painting was displayed at the Salon of 1864 held in Paris. Today it is in the collection of the Château de Compiègne.

== See also ==
- The Battle of Solferino, an 1863 painting by Adolphe Yvon

== Bibliography ==
- Brauer, Fae. Rivals and Conspirators: The Paris Salons and the Modern Art Centre. Cambridge Scholars Publishing, 2014.
- Marwil, Jonathan. Visiting Modern War in Risorgimento Italy. Palgrave Macmillan, 2010.
- Milner, John. Art, War and Revolution in France, 1870-1871: Myth, Reportage and Reality. Yale University Press, 2000.
- Thoma, Julia. The Final Spectacle: Military Painting under the Second Empire, 1855–1867. Walter de Gruyter, 2019.
