= Battle of Malakoff =

1855 battle of the Crimean War

Coordinates: 44.603888898889°N 33.549166676667°E

- Part of the siege of Sevastopol and the Crimean War
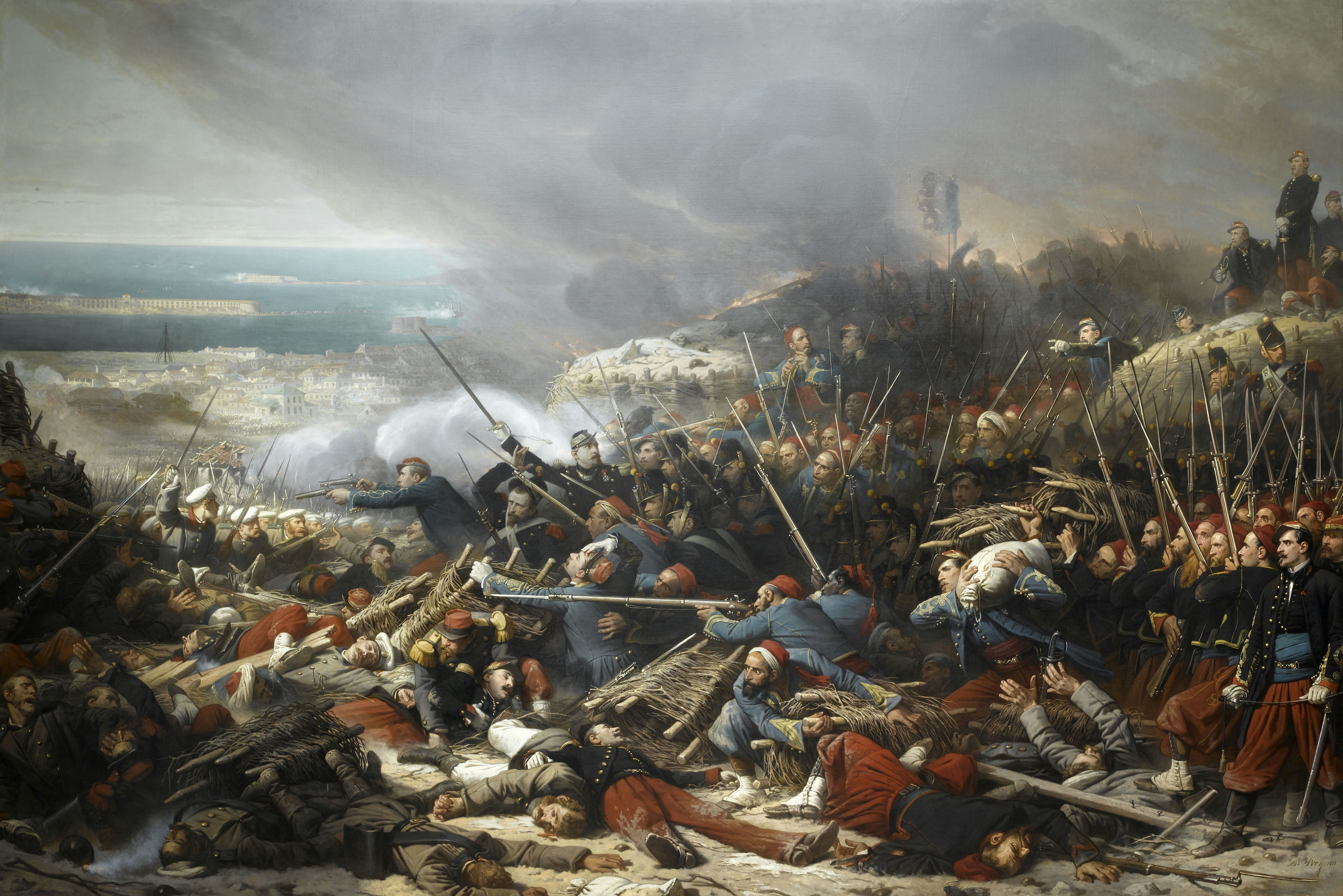
- The Malakoff Gorge by Adolphe Yvon, 1859
Date	18 June 1855: 1st assault 8 September 1855: 2nd assault (Note: June 18 and September 8 were the dates of the two French assaults on Malakoff, but the Allies shelled the position throughout the siege from October 1854 to September 1855. During the Crimean War, the Allies used the Gregorian calendar while the Russians used the Julian calendar. Because of the difference of twelve days between the two calendars, some sources claim that the battle of Malakoff took place on August 27.)
Location	Malakhov Kurgan, Sevastopol, Taurida Governorate, Russian Empire
Result	French victory: 1st assault repulsed; 2nd assault successful

Belligerents
(France) French Empire	Russian Empire

Commanders and leaders
(France) Patrice de MacMahon (France) Aimable Pélissier	(Russian Empire) Mikhail Dmitrievich Gorchakov

Strength
70,500: 1st assault: 28,000 (Note: Fletcher and Ischenko point out that for the assault on June 18 the French assembled three divisions of 6,000 men each with a fourth in reserve, while the British sent 3,000 men to storm the Great Redan and another 1,000 in reserve; the Russians had 35 infantry battalions behind Malakoff and Little Redan. Guillemin suggests that 11,000 Russians were defending the suburb of Korabelnaya. Eduard Totleben indicates that at this stage of the siege Sevastopol was defended by about 53,000 men, supported by 22,000 soldiers stationed on the heights east of the city. Allied forces numbered 100,000 French, 45,000 British, 15,000 Sardinians, and 7,000 Ottomans. ·); 2nd assault: 60,000 (Note: According to Skorikov, 1,400 infantrymen, 500 artillerymen, 900 diggers and 100 sappers were at Malakoff on September 8. Fletcher and Ishchenko state that Sevastopol was defended by about 50,000 soldiers, and that the French had 25,000 men lined up against the Korabelnaya suburb and 20,000 against the city; they were also supported by 5,000 Sardinians deployed against the Flagstaff Bastion. Figes notes that the French deployed ten and a half divisions to attack, representing 35,000 French and 2,000 Sardinians. Guillemin suggests that 50,000 Russians held the city, while the British fielded 10,700 men. Gouttman mentions 50,000 Russians attacked by 20,500 French from the city side, 25,500 French from the suburb of Korabelnaya, 10,700 British and a Sardinian brigade.)	59,500: 1st assault: 11,000 (Note: Fletcher and Ischenko point out that for the assault on June 18 the French assembled three divisions of 6,000 men each with a fourth in reserve, while the British sent 3,000 men to storm the Great Redan and another 1,000 in reserve; the Russians had 35 infantry battalions behind Malakoff and Little Redan. Guillemin suggests that 11,000 Russians were defending the suburb of Korabelnaya. Eduard Totleben indicates that at this stage of the siege Sevastopol was defended by about 53,000 men, supported by 22,000 soldiers stationed on the heights east of the city. Allied forces numbered 100,000 French, 45,000 British, 15,000 Sardinians, and 7,000 Ottomans. ·); 2nd assault: 50,000 (Note: According to Skorikov, 1,400 infantrymen, 500 artillerymen, 900 diggers and 100 sappers were at Malakoff on September 8. Fletcher and Ishchenko state that Sevastopol was defended by about 50,000 soldiers, and that the French had 25,000 men lined up against the Korabelnaya suburb and 20,000 against the city; they were also supported by 5,000 Sardinians deployed against the Flagstaff Bastion. Figes notes that the French deployed ten and a half divisions to attack, representing 35,000 French and 2,000 Sardinians. Guillemin suggests that 50,000 Russians held the city, while the British fielded 10,700 men. Gouttman mentions 50,000 Russians attacked by 20,500 French from the city side, 25,500 French from the suburb of Korabelnaya, 10,700 British and a Sardinian brigade.)

Casualties and losses
1st assault: 5,000 (Note: Gooch reported French losses of 3,500 men on June 18, compared with 1,500 for the British and Russians. Fletcher and Ischenko cited the same figures, adding that the Russians lost 4,000 men in the June 17 bombardment. Guillemin states that the Russians lost 5,500 men, including 4,000 in the bombardment on the 17th, the British 1,700, the French 1,400 killed, 1,800 wounded, and 400 prisoners of war. Gouttman estimates that the French had 1,600 killed and 2,200 wounded, while the Russians and British had 1,500 killed and wounded each. Figes reports that the British lost about 1,000 men and the French "perhaps six times that number, but the exact number has been censored."); 2nd assault: 10,000 (Note: Fletcher and Ischenko note that French losses on September 8 were 1,634 killed, 4,513 wounded, and 1,410 missing; Russians 2,684 killed, 7,243 wounded, and 1,739 missing; British 390 killed, 2,043 wounded, and 177 missing; they note that the missing can be considered killed. Guillemin reports that the French lost 7,600 men, including 1,900 killed, the Russians lost 12,900 men, including 3,000 killed, the British lost 2,400 men, including 400 killed, and the Sardinians lost 40 men. Gouttman suggests that the Russians lost 13,000 men, the French 7,500, and the British 2,500.) Other estimates of the 2nd assault: 7,546 to 10,000	1st assault: 5,500 (Note: Gooch reported French losses of 3,500 men on June 18, compared with 1,500 for the British and Russians. Fletcher and Ischenko cited the same figures, adding that the Russians lost 4,000 men in the June 17 bombardment. Guillemin states that the Russians lost 5,500 men, including 4,000 in the bombardment on the 17th, the British 1,700, the French 1,400 killed, 1,800 wounded, and 400 prisoners of war. Gouttman estimates that the French had 1,600 killed and 2,200 wounded, while the British had 1,500 killed and wounded, the Russians had 1,500 killed and wounded in battle, plus about 4,000 lost from the bombardment. Figes reports that the British lost about 1,000 men and the French "perhaps six times that number, but the exact number has been censored."); 2nd assault: 12,000 (Note: Fletcher and Ischenko note that French losses on September 8 were 1,634 killed, 4,513 wounded, and 1,410 missing; Russians 2,684 killed, 7,243 wounded, and 1,739 missing; British 390 killed, 2,043 wounded, and 177 missing; they note that the missing can be considered killed. Guillemin reports that the French lost 7,600 men, including 1,900 killed, the Russians lost 12,900 men, including 3,000 killed, the British lost 2,400 men, including 400 killed, and the Sardinians lost 40 men. Gouttman suggests that the Russians lost 13,000 men, the French 7,500, and the British 2,500.) Another estimate of the 2nd assault: 13,000

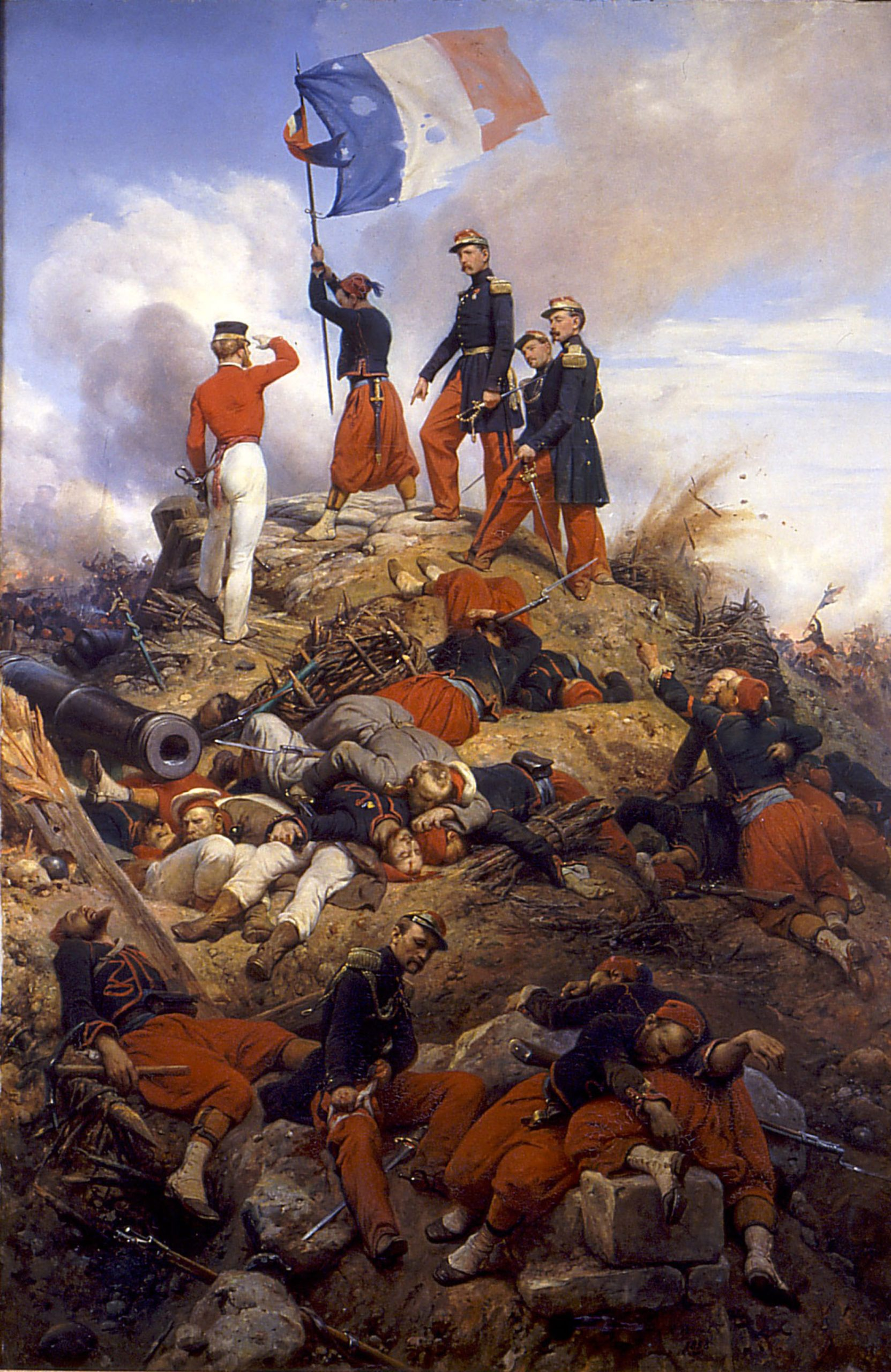
The Capture of Malakoff by Horace Vernet. A British officer salutes the French flag.

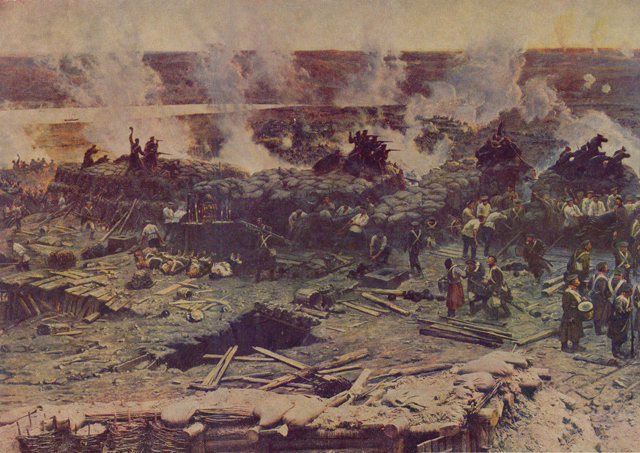
Detail of Franz Roubaud's panoramic painting (1904).

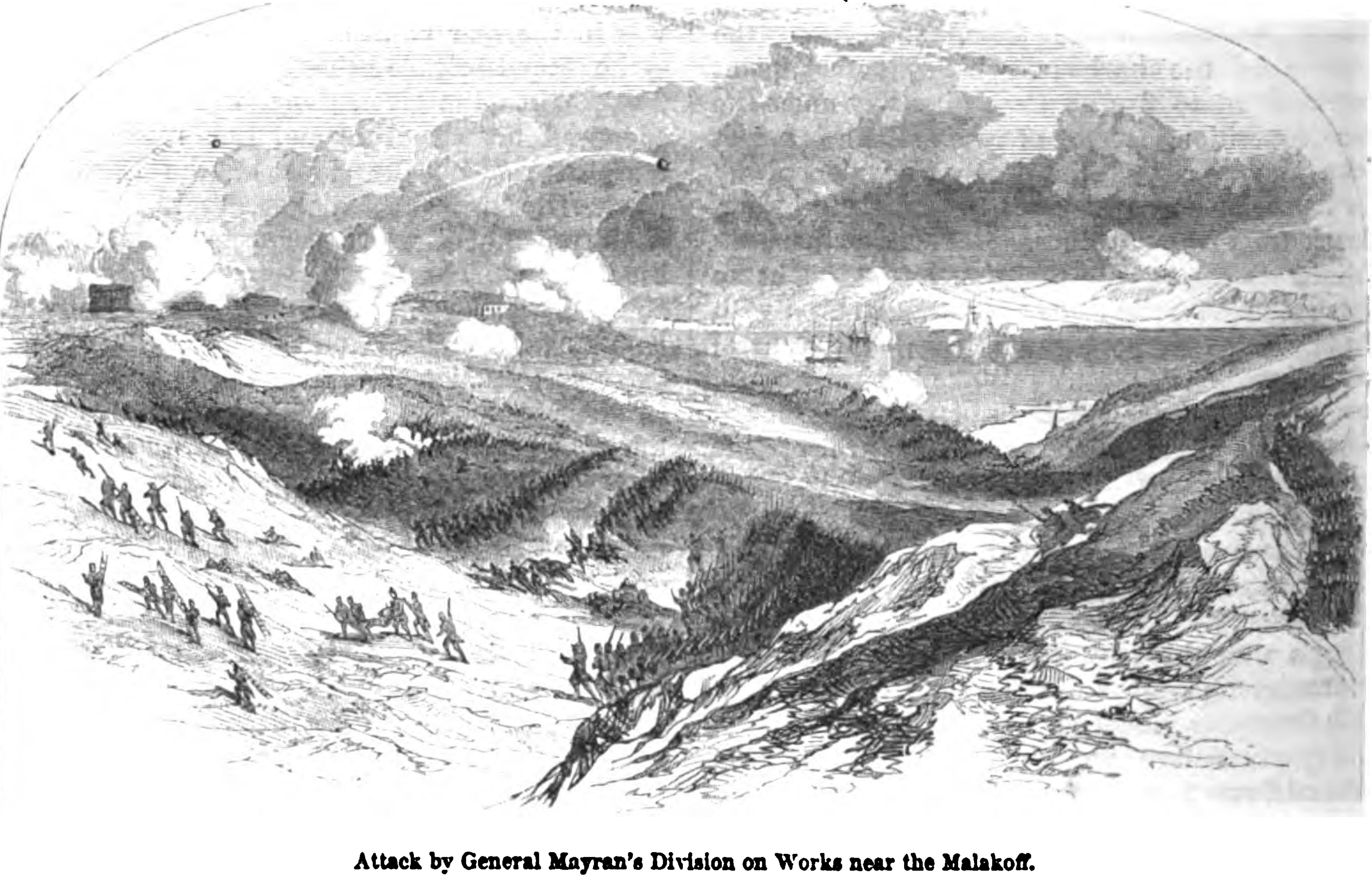
Attack by General Mayran's Division on Works near the Malakoff. George Dodd. Pictorial history of the Russian war 1854–56

The Battle of Malakoff (French: Bataille de Malakoff, Russian: Бой на Малаховом кургане) or the Storming of the Malakhov Kurgan (Russian: Штурм Малахова кургана) was a series of French attacks against Russian forces on the Malakoff redoubt. The first attack was unsuccessful, and occurred on 18 June 1855; subsequent capture of the redoubt was on 8 September 1855. The assaults were parts of the Crimean War and the siege of Sevastopol. The French army under General MacMahon successfully stormed the Malakoff redoubt on 8th, while a simultaneous British attack on the Redan to the south of the Malakoff was repulsed. In one of the war's defining moments, the French zouave Eugène Libaut raised the French flag on the top of the Russian redoubt. The battle of Malakoff resulted in the fall of Sevastopol on 9 September, bringing the 11-month siege to an end.

== Background ==
Until 1784, most of the fortifications around Sevastopol were dedicated to the protection of the harbour entrance, the city itself and its naval base and were positioned close to these features. The construction of fortifications in the surrounding hills had been planned as early as 1837, but at the time of the battle only basic facilities and roadways had been completed on the north side of the long, westward-facing bay. To the south the central anchor of the defence system was the Malakoff-Kurgan ridge. Situated about 2 1/2 miles (4.0 km) southeast of the city, it consisted of a two-story stone tower of limestone on which the Russians had placed five heavy 18-pounder cannons at the beginning of the siege.

There is some mystery surrounding this tower. Although it is known that the tower was built some time before the start of the war, the historical records do not show exactly when this occurred, and no mention of this is made in the contemporary descriptions of the siege itself. Additionally, there are different spellings and translations into or from Russian, including Малахова башня. What is known is that the tower was originally built or expanded by Sevastopol merchants and then later taken over by the Russian Navy. The tower had a diameter of about 14–15 metres (46–49 ft) and a height of 8 metres (26 ft). In its centre the battery known as "Lunette Kamchatka" was placed. This was a smaller fortification that was designed to protect several artillery pieces.

At this time the Russian cartographers marked all landmarks in and around this ridge as "Fort Malakoff". This included several large grave mounds and the same ridge lying in front known as Mamelon ("vert Mamelon"). The name "Fortmortal Malakoff" (or French "Fort Malakoff", Russian "Malakhov") was retained after the war in Western literature covering the Crimean War.

The harbour of Sevastopol, formed by the estuary of the Chernaya, was protected against attack by sea not only by the Russian war-vessels, afloat and sunken, but also by heavy granite forts on the south side and by the defensive works. For the town itself, and the suburb of Korabelnaya, the plans for the works had been laid down for years. The Malakoff Tower covered the suburb, flanked on either side by the Redan and the Little Redan. The town was covered by a line of works marked by a flagstaff and central bastions, and separated from the Redan by the inner harbour.

Lieutenant Colonel Eduard Totleben, the Russian chief engineer, had begun work on these sites early in the war. Through daily efforts to rebuild, re-arm and improve the fortifications, he was able to finally connect them with a continuous defence system enceinte. Yet early in October 1854, Sevastopol was not the towering fortress it later became, and Totleben himself maintained that had the allies assaulted it immediately, they would have succeeded in taking the city. There were, however, many reasons against them doing so at the time, and it was not until 17 October that the first attack took place.

== Battle ==
Throughout 17 October, a tremendous artillery duel raged. The Russian artillery was initially successful, the French corps fell under siege and suffered heavy losses. The advancing fleet engaging the harbour batteries also suffered a loss of 500 men and several ships were heavily damaged. Still, British siege batteries managed to silence the Malakoff and its annexes, after having succeeded in hitting a munitions depot and, if failure had not occurred at the other points of attack, an assault might have succeeded. As it was, by daybreak, Totleben's engineers had repaired and improved the damaged works.

For months the siege of Sevastopol continued. During July the Russians lost on an average of 250 men a day, and finally the Russians decided to break the stalemate and gradual attrition of their army. Gorchakov and the field army were to make another attack at the Chernaya, the first since the Inkerman. On 16 August, both Pavel Liprandi and Read's corps furiously attacked the 37,000 French and Sardinian troops on the heights above Traktir Bridge. The assailants came on with the greatest determination, but they were ultimately unsuccessful. At the end of the day, the Russians drew off leaving 260 officers and 8,000 men dead or dying on the field; the French and British only lost 1,700. With this defeat the last chance of saving Sevastopol vanished.

The same day, a determined bombardment once more reduced the Malakoff and its dependencies to impotence, and it was with absolute confidence in the result that Marshal Pélissier planned the final assault. At noon on 8 September 1855, the whole of Bosquet's corps suddenly attacked all along the right sector. The fighting was of the most desperate kind: the French attack on the Malakoff was successful, but the other two French attacks were repelled. The British attack on the Redan was initially successful, but a Russian counterattack drove the British out of the bastion after two hours after the French attacks on the Flagstaff Bastion (left of the Great Redan) were repelled. With the failure of the French attacks in the left sector but with the fall of the Malakoff in French hands further attacks were cancelled. The Russian positions around the city were no longer tenable.

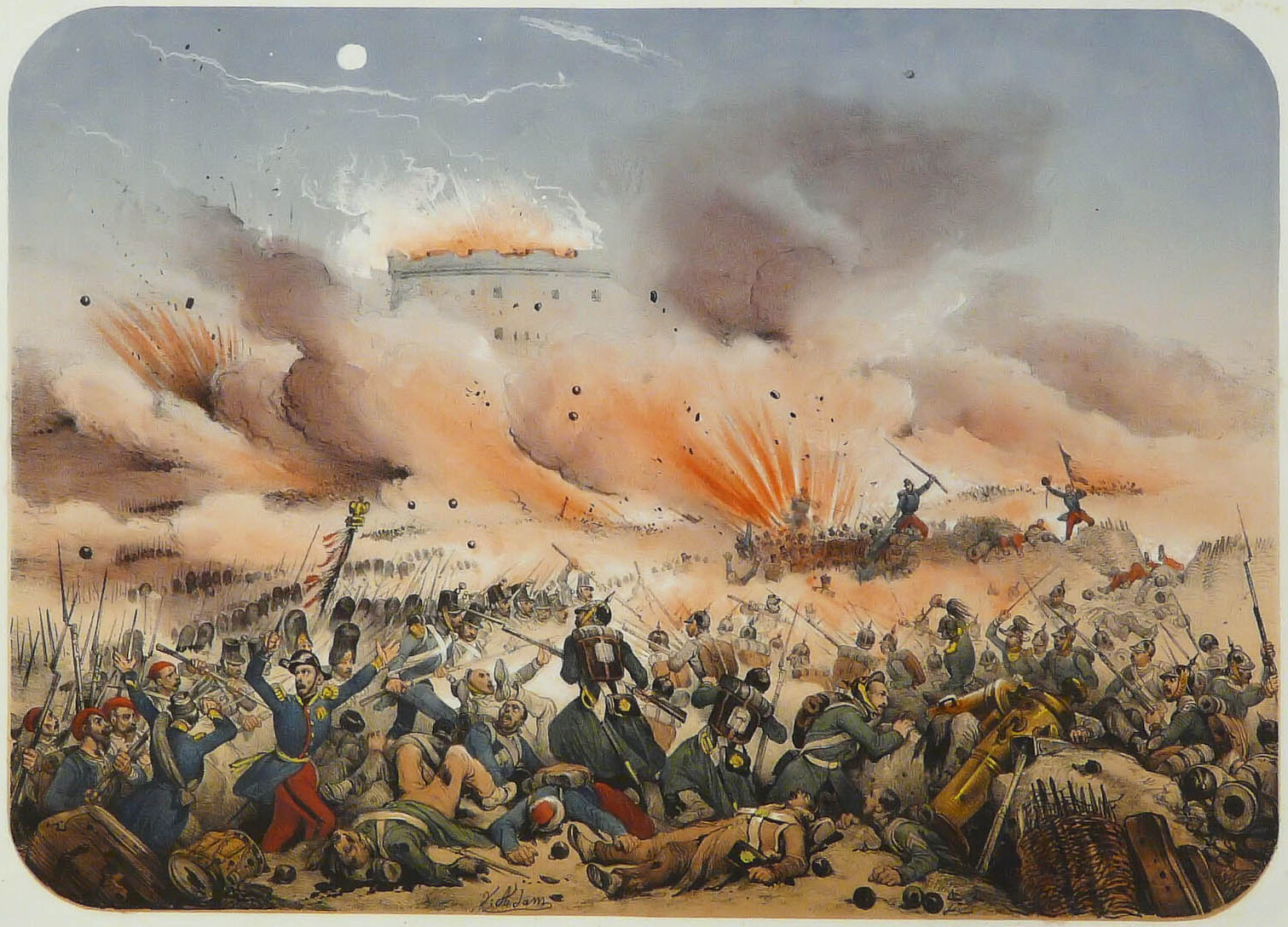
Attack upon the tower, by Victor Adam

Throughout the day the bombardment mowed down the massed Russian soldiers along the whole line. The fall of the Malakoff was the end of the siege of the city. That night the Russians fled over the bridges to the north side, and on 9 September the victors took possession of the empty and burning city. The losses in the last assault had been very heavy: for the Allies over 8,000 men, for the Russians 13,000. At least nineteen generals had fallen on the final day and with the capture of Sevastopol the war was decided. No serious operations were undertaken against Gorchakov who, with the field army and the remnants of the garrison, held the heights at Mackenzie's Farm. But Kinburn was attacked by sea and, from the naval point of view, became the first instance of the employment of Ironclad warships. An armistice was agreed upon on 26 February and the Treaty of Paris was signed on 30 March 1856.

== Order of battle, 8 September 1855 ==
Right to left

French right sector (French 2nd Corps under GdD Bosquet)

- Little Redan: 3rd Division (General de division Dulac) – 17th Chasseurs, 10th, 57th, 61st and 85th Line, with 2nd brigade, 2nd Division of the Reserve Corps (GdB Jonquière) attached – 15th and 95th Line, and the Chasseurs of the Guard also attached
- Curtain wall between Malakoff and Little Redan: 4th Division (GdD La Motte Rouge) – 4th Chasseurs, 49th, 86th, 91st and 100th line, with Imperial Guard infantry brigade (GdB Uhrich) attached – 1st and 2nd Guard Grenadiers (1 Bn each) and 1st and 2nd Guard Voltigeurs (1 Bn each)
- Malakoff: 1st Division (GdD MacMahon) – 1st Chasseurs; 7th, 20th, and 27th Line, and 1st Zouaves, with 1st brigade, 2nd Division (GdB Wimpffen) attached – Tirailleurs Algerien, 3rd Zouaves and 50th Line, and the Guard Zouaves (two battalions under Colonel Jannin) also attached

British sector (see Battle of the Great Redan)

French left sector (French 1st Corps under GdD La Salles)

- Bastion du Mat (Flagstaff bastion): 5th Division (GdD D'Autemarre) – 5th Chasseurs, 19th, 26th, 39th and 74th Line, with Cialdini's Sardinian brigade attached
- Central Bastion: 2nd Division (GdD Levaillant) – 9th Chasseurs, 21st, 42nd, 46th and 80th Line, with 3rd Division (GdD Paté) – 6th Chasseurs, 28th and 98th Line, and 1st and 2nd Foreign Legion, and 4th Division (GdD Lefevre) – 10th Chasseurs, 14th, 18th, 43rd and 79th Line in reserve
- Covering the left flank – 30th and 35th Line (detached from other commands)

== Aftermath ==
A large Russian mortar which was known as "Whistling Dick" by the British as the hoisting rings on its 15-inch shells made a peculiar whistling noise when lobbed through the air.

At first sight Russia would seem to be almost invulnerable to a sea power, and no first success, however crushing, could have humbled Nicholas I. Indeed, the mere capture of Sevastopol would not have been strategically decisive. However, as the Tsar had decided to defend it at all costs and with unlimited resources, it became an unpleasant defeat, especially as the Allies had reached victory with limited resources.

During the nearly one-year siege of Sevastopol in the Crimean War, the fortifications on the Malakhov were hotly contested as they overlooked the whole city and the inner harbour. After the success of the French troops under the command of Marshal Pelissier, later the Duke of Malakoff (French: Duc de Malakoff), and General Patrice de Mac-Mahon, the Russian defenders evacuated the entire city on 8 September 1855, bringing a climax to the war.

As the fortress enabled the control of the Black Sea port of Sevastopol, the Russian forces destroyed all of their equipment and withdrew, leaving Russia with no more military fortifications on the Black Sea. The long-awaited Russian domination of the inland sea to obtain free passage through the Bosporus to the Mediterranean (and beyond) was now not possible.

In terms of logistics, the British and French had a significant advantage over the Russians as they were able to receive supplies from the sea, while the Russians had to bring supplies over the underdeveloped and dangerous desert tracks of southern Russia. The Russians lost many men and horses in bringing supplies to Sevastopol. The hasty nature, too, of the fortifications, which were damaged every day during the siege by the fire of a thousand guns, and had to be rebuilt every night, required large, unprotected working parties and the losses amongst these were correspondingly heavy. These losses exhausted Russia's resources and when they were forced to employ large bodies of militia in the Battle of Traktir Bridge, it was obvious that the end was at hand.

The short stories of Leo Tolstoy, who was present at the siege, give a graphic picture of the war from the Russian point of view, portraying the miseries of the desert march, the still greater miseries of life in the casemates, and the almost daily ordeal of manning the lines, under shell-fire, against an assault which might or might not come.

Among the seven surviving defenders of a stone tower on the Malakov Kurgan, which were found by French troops among the dead, was the seriously wounded Vasily Kolchak, the father of Aleksandr Vasiliyevich Kolchak. Kolchak would later become the head of all the counter-revolutionary anti-communist White forces during the Russian Civil War.

As a result of press coverage of the siege of the tower, Malakhov Kurgan became a household name in Europe and many large and expensive towers in Western Europe were named after it. Among these were a number of stone mining towers in the Ruhrgebiet, the so-called caponier Fort Malakoff in Mainz, and the yellow sandstone Malakoff Tower in the city of Luxembourg. In addition, the Malakoff cake was named after the Duke of Malakoff, as was a cheese dish in parts of Switzerland. In France, the battle was officially commemorated in a rare way: apart from the Battle of Magenta (in the Italian Campaign), it was the only one of Emperor Napoleon III's exploits to result in the awarding of a victory title (both of ducal rank); this distinction was bestowed upon Marshal Pélissier.

A suburb of Paris was also named after this battle, as well as the Avenue de Malakoff. Malakhov Kurgan, where it was fought, now contains the Eternal Fire, commemorating the siege of Sevastopol during World War II. A branch of Franz Roubaud's great panorama representing the battle of 1855 is also located there.
