= The Battle of Solferino (painting) =

Painting by Adolphe Yvon

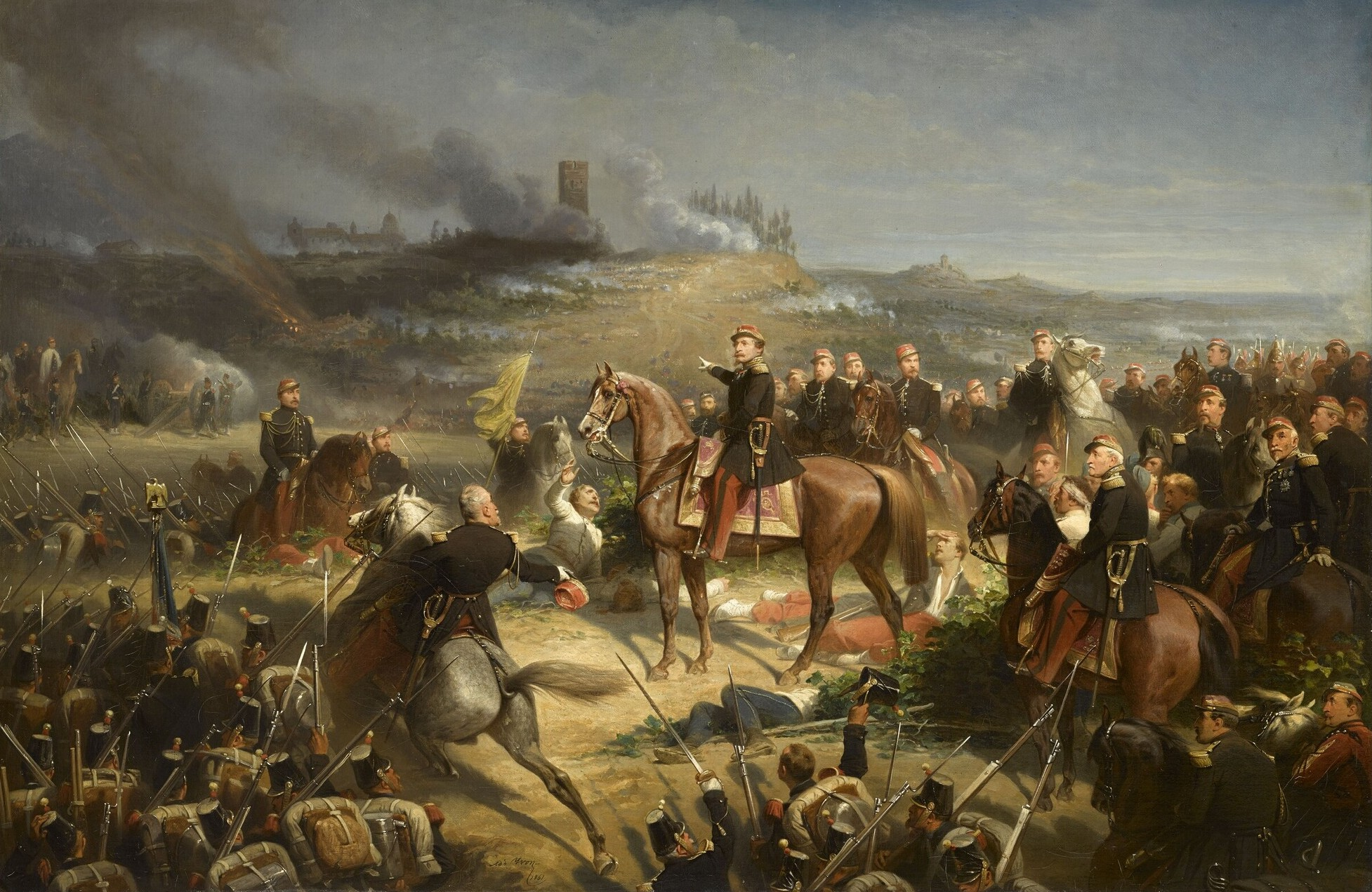
- Artist: Adolphe Yvon
- Year: 1861
- Type: Oil on canvas, history painting
- Dimensions: 600 cm × 900 cm (240 in × 350 in)
- Location: Palace of Versailles, Versailles

The Battle of Solferino (French: Bataille de Solferino) is an oil on canvas history painting by the French artist Adolphe Yvon, from 1861. The large canvas depicts the Battle of Solferino fought on 24 June 1859 during the Second Italian War of Independence, where the intervention of the French Army decisively tipped the balance against the Austrians. The French Emperor Napoleon III is shown prominently in the centre of the picture. It also features depictions of many other leading French figures of the time including Patrice de MacMahon.

The painting was commissioned by Napoleon III and was exhibited at the Salon of 1861 in Paris. Today it is in the collection of the Museum of French History at the Palace of Versailles, where it hangs in the Galerie des Batailles.

== See also ==
- Napoleon III at the Battle of Solferino, an 1863 painting by Ernest Meissonier

== Bibliography ==
- Marwil, Jonathan. Visiting Modern War in Risorgimento Italy. Palgrave Macmillan, 2010.
- Thoma, Julia. The Final Spectacle: Military Painting under the Second Empire, 1855–1867. Walter de Gruyter, 2019.
