= Marshal Ney Supporting the Rear Guard During the Retreat from Moscow =

Painting by Adolphe Yvon

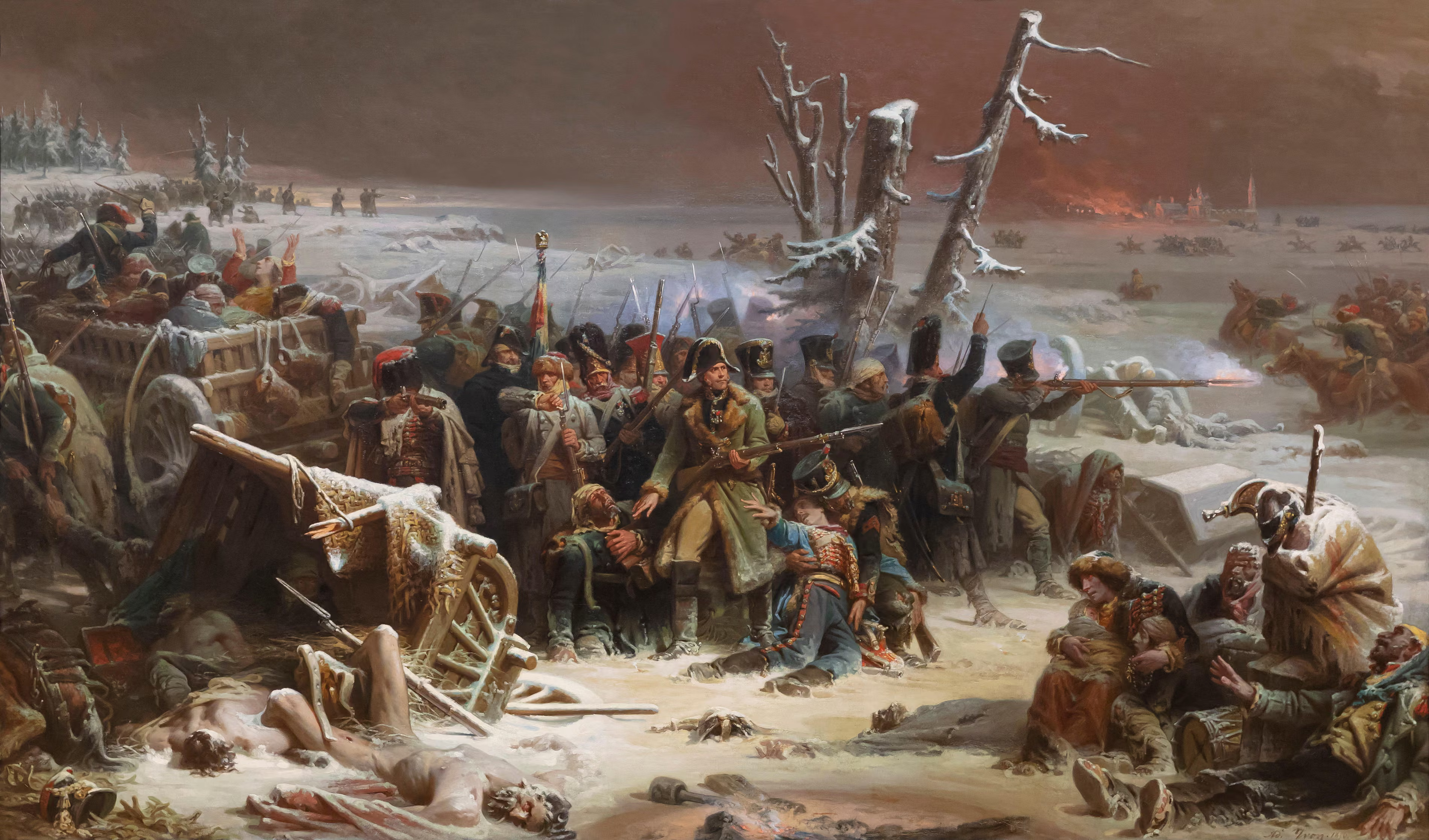
- Version in Manchester Art Gallery
- Artist: Adolphe Yvon
- Year: 1855
- Type: Oil on canvas, history painting
- Dimensions: 600 cm × 900 cm (240 in × 350 in)
- Location: Palace of Versailles; Versailles

Marshal Ney Supporting the Rear Guard During the Retreat from Moscow (French: Le maréchal Ney soutenant l'arrière-garde de la Grande Armée) is an oil on canvas history painting by the French artist Adolphe Yvon, from 1855.

== History and description ==
It depicts a scene from December 1812 during the Retreat from Moscow following Napoleon's ultimately disastrous Invasion of Russia. The French Marshal Michel Ney rallies the rear guard of the Grande Armée.

Yvon had trained under Paul Delaroche and was noted for his Romantic paintings of battle scenes. The large painting was commissioned by Napoleon III in 1852 as part of a trend to glorify moments from French military history. It was completed in 1855 and was exhibited at the Salon of 1855 in Paris, part of the wider Exposition Universelle. Today the painting forms part of the collection of the Museum of French History at the Palace of Versailles.

A second version was produced in 1856 and is now in the Manchester Art Gallery in England.

== Bibliography ==
- Reymert, Martin L.H. Ingres & Delacroix Through Degas & Puvis de Chavannes: The Figure in French Art, 1800-1870. The Gallery, 1975.
- Thoma, Julia. The Final Spectacle: Military Painting under the Second Empire, 1855–1867. Walter de Gruyter, 2019.
