= Alfred Wordsworth Thompson =

American painter (1840–1896)

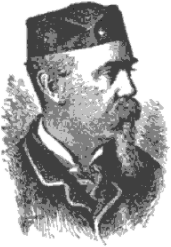
- Born: May 26, 1840; Baltimore, Maryland
- Died: August 28, 1896 (aged 56); Summit, New Jersey
- Occupation: Painter
- Spouse: Mary Pumpelly (m. 1876)

Alfred Wordsworth Thompson (May 26, 1840 – August 28, 1896) was an American landscape and history painter.

== Biography ==
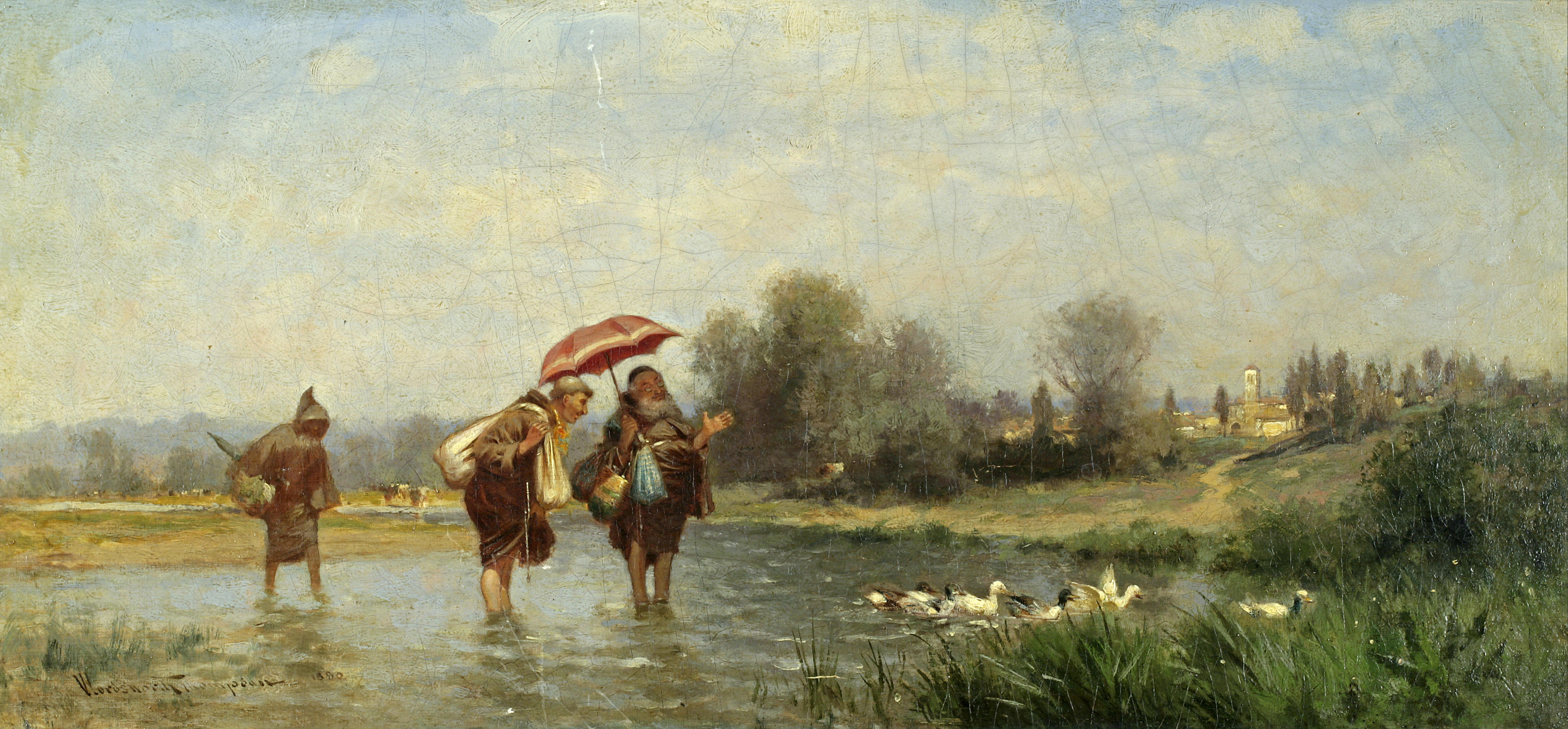
Monks and Ducks

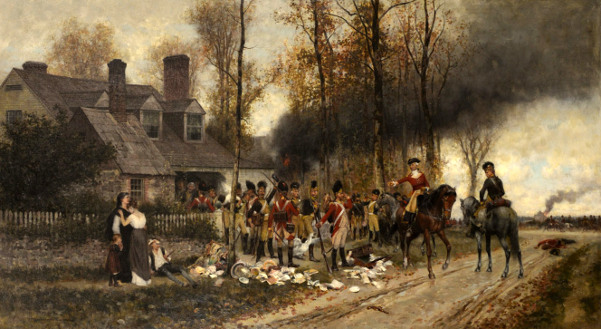
Advance of the Enemy

Alfred Wordsworth Thompson was born in Baltimore on May 26, 1840. After completing his secondary education, he was enrolled at Newton University, to prepare him for a career in his father's law practice. His interest in art prevailed, however, and not long before the Civil War began, he had established his own art studio, where he created illustrations for Harper's Weekly and the Illustrated London News. His contributions to Harper's included a sketch of the abolitionist John Brown, whom he had visited in prison. When the war broke out, he went to work for them as a type of special correspondent; spending much of his time in Virginia.

After holding that position for less than a year, and possibly fearing conscription, he quit and went to Paris, where he would remain until 1868. He was able to enter the École des Beaux-Arts in 1864; studying with Charles Gleyre, Alberto Pasini and Émile Lambinet. He also studied horse anatomy with the sculptor, Antoine-Louis Barye. In 1865, he exhibited a landscape at the Salon. Later, before returning home, he visited Germany and Austria and took a walking tour from Heidelberg to Calabria.

He chose to establish a studio in New York City, instead of Baltimore. Not long after, he exhibited some works at the National Academy of Design; becoming a member there in 1875. The academy would be his major venue, with over 125 paintings sold there; 40 of them depicting scenes from the Revolutionary War. Despite this, in 1878, he joined the Society of American Artists, an organization formed in opposition to the academy's conservative approach.

He married Mary Pumpelly in 1876.

He was an avid traveller throughout his life, visiting Turkey, Morocco and Spain. In the 1870s, during the Reconstruction era, he made several what were then risky trips into Virginia and North Carolina, where he painted rural genre scenes. Some of those paintings were exhibited at the Brooklyn Art Association and at the Centennial Exhibition in Philadelphia.

His last twelve years were spent in semi-retirement in Summit, New Jersey. Many of his works may be seen at the New York Historical Society, the Union League Club, the Albright-Knox Art Gallery in Buffalo and at the Chrysler Museum of Art. His Civil War painting Cannonading on the Potomac is in the art collection of the White House.

Alfred Wordsworth Thompson died in Summit on August 28, 1896.
