= Adolphe Yvon =

French painter (1817–1893)

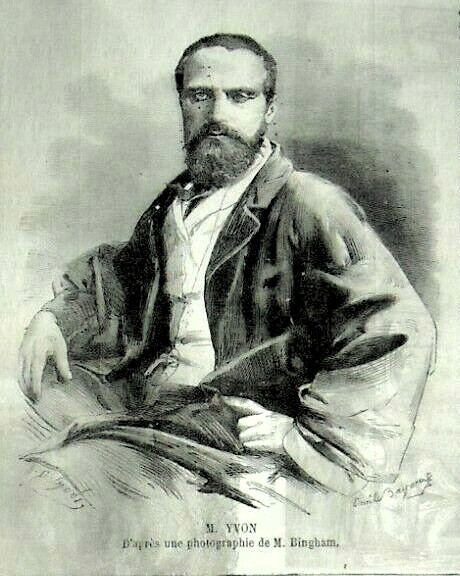
- Portrait in the Le Monde illustré (1859)
- Born: Adolphe Yvon; 30 January 1817; Eschviller, France
- Died: 11 September 1893 (aged 76); Paris, France
- Education: École des Beaux-Arts
- Known for: Painting
- Movement: Romanticism

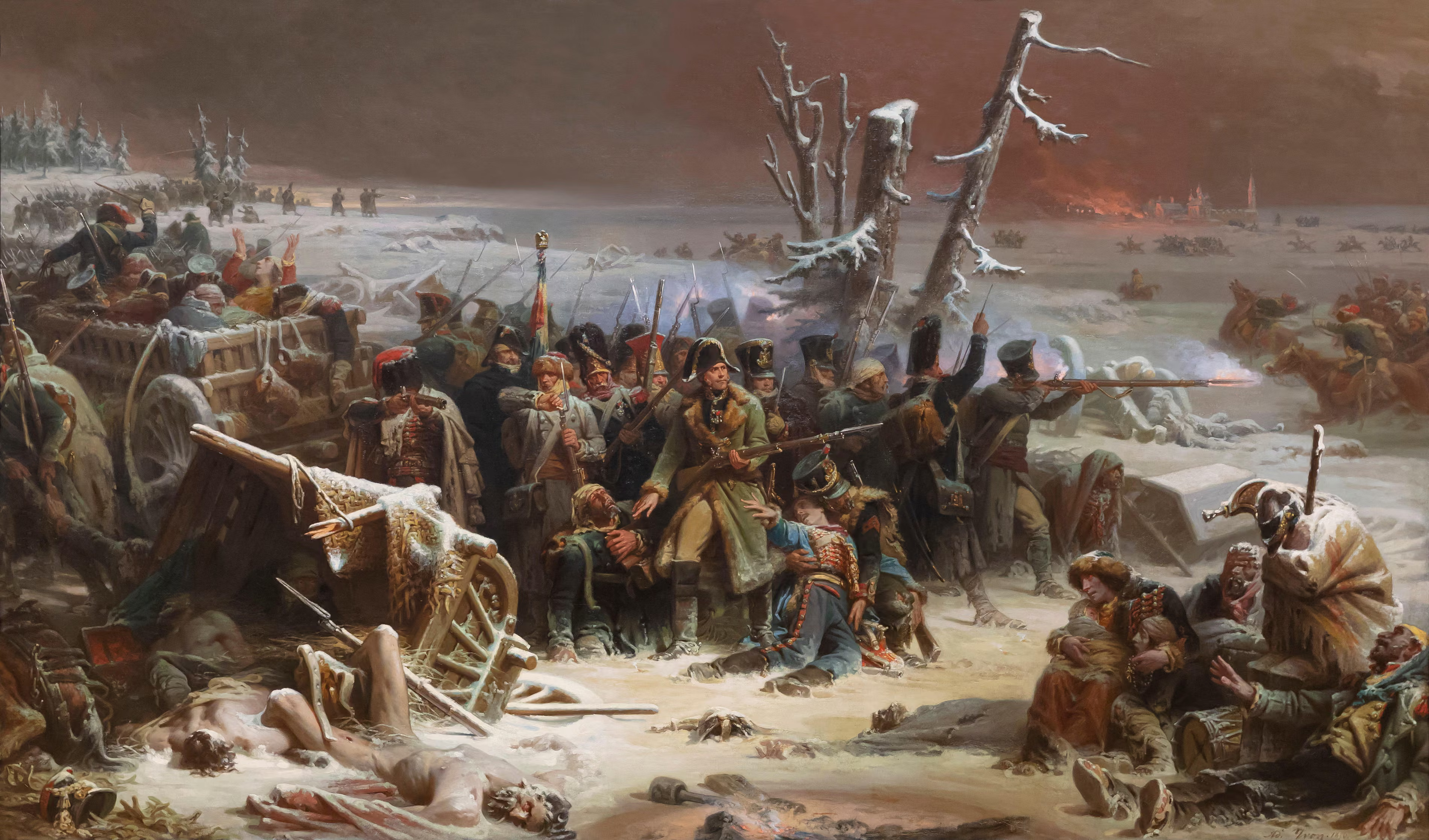
Marshal Ney Supporting the Rear Guard During the Retreat from Moscow (1855)

Adolphe Yvon (30 January 1817 – 11 September 1893) was a French painter known for his paintings of the Napoleonic Wars. Yvon studied under Paul Delaroche, rose to fame during the Second Empire, then finished his career as a teacher.

== Career ==
Adolphe Yvon was born on 30 January 1817 in Eschviller. Shortly after the end of the Crimean War in September 1855, Yvon was commissioned by the French government to paint a large picture of the capture of the Malakoff at Sevastopol. He sailed for the Crimea on February 19, 1856, where he spent six weeks compiling a portfolio of sketches, as well as visiting the battlefield of Inkerman. In 1857, the finished painting La Prise de la tour de Malakoff 8 septembre 1855 was shown at the Paris Salon, and two years later came La Gorge de Malakoff, and La courtine de Malakoff. La Prise was a massive piece measuring 6 metres by 9 metres and represented the moment when the fortification was captured around midday.

In the succeeding years, Emperor Napoleon III began to admire his battle scenes. Yvon became an officer of the Légion d'honneur in 1867, and painted Napoleon III's portrait the following year (unlocated). Yvon was known as the leading teacher of drawing at the École des Beaux-Arts (1863–83), and published the book Method of Drawing, also in 1867. Some of his most notable students include António Soares dos Reis and Henrique Pousão. A few Americans received instruction from him, including Christian Schussele, Alfred Wordsworth Thompson, William Sartain, and J. Alden Weir. The latter took Yvon's afternoon life-drawing class starting in the fall of 1874. Yvon provided the subject for compositional sketches for his students, for example, "The Assassination of Julius Caesar", for which he specified how it should be done: "Caesar covers his head with his toga . . . he was shoved to the base of Pompey's statue, which became bathed in his blood." (Archives of the École des Beaux-Arts, Archives Nationales, AJ52 63). Alexander Stewart, the American collector, commissioned Yvon to paint The Reconciliation of the North and the South (lost) in 1870, as well as The Genius of America (1858, 1870). His Portrait of President Carnot (1888) appeared at the World's Columbian Exposition.

He died on 11 September 1893 in Paris.

== Gallery ==
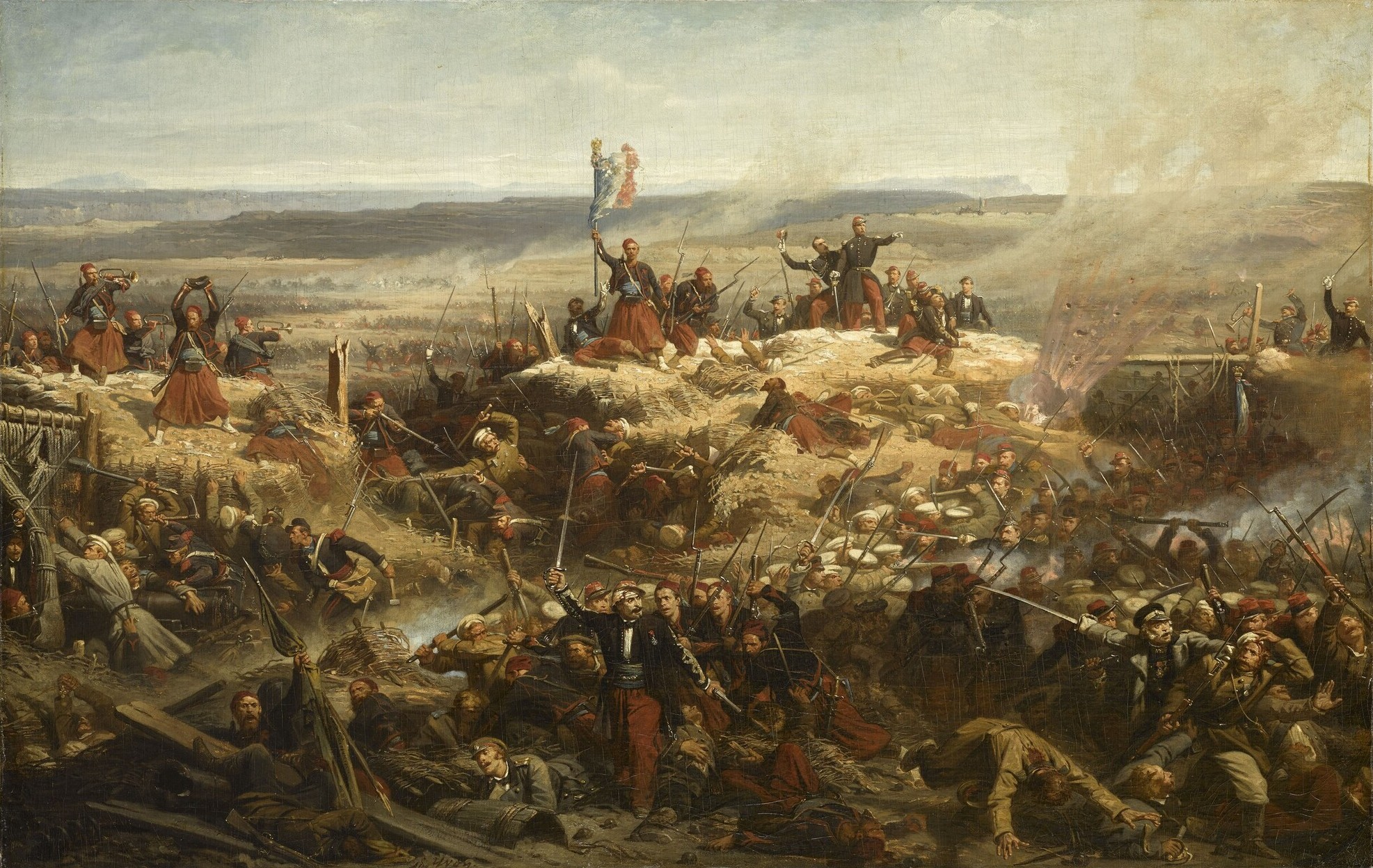
The Capture of the Malakoff Tower (1857)

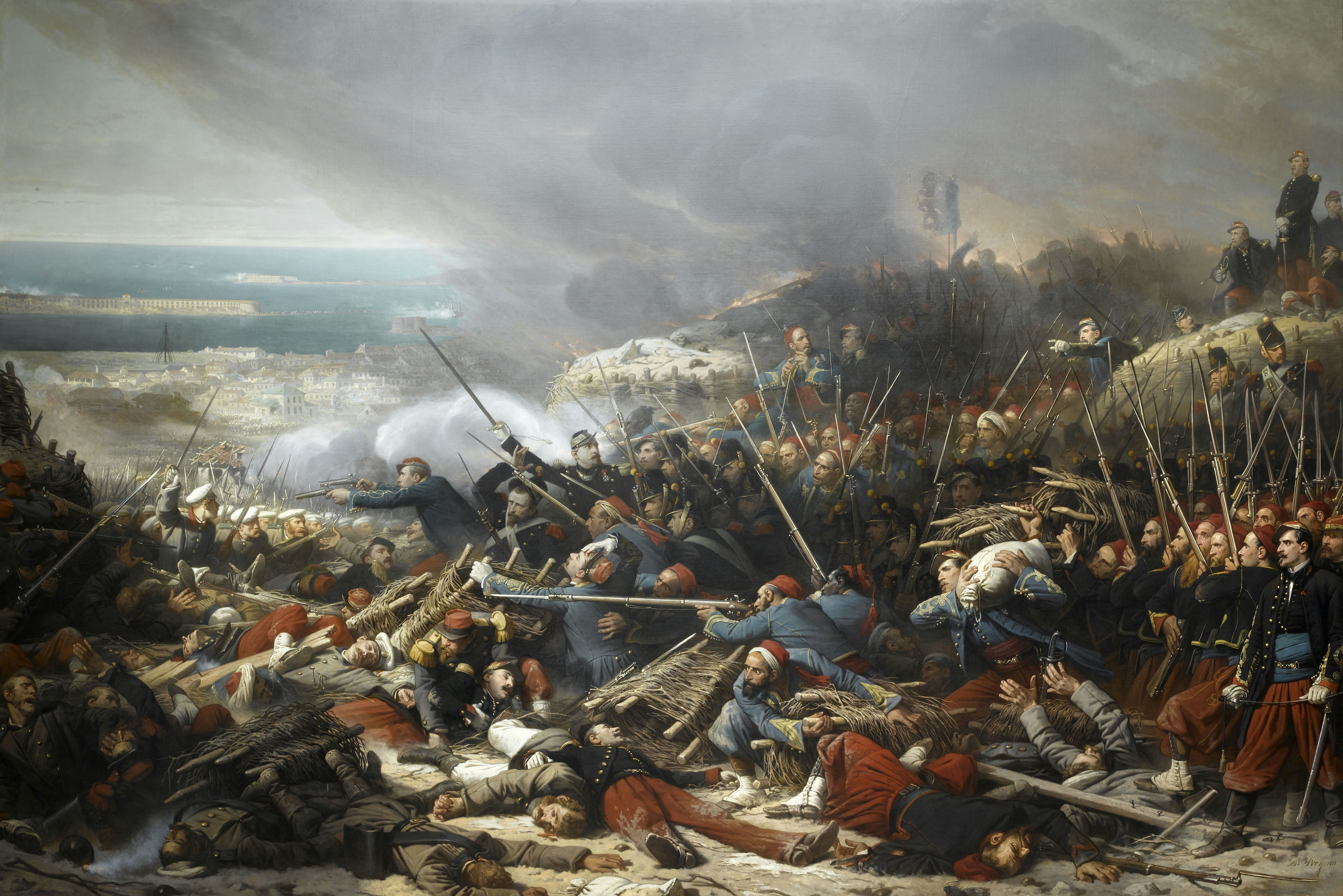
The Malakoff Gorge (1859)

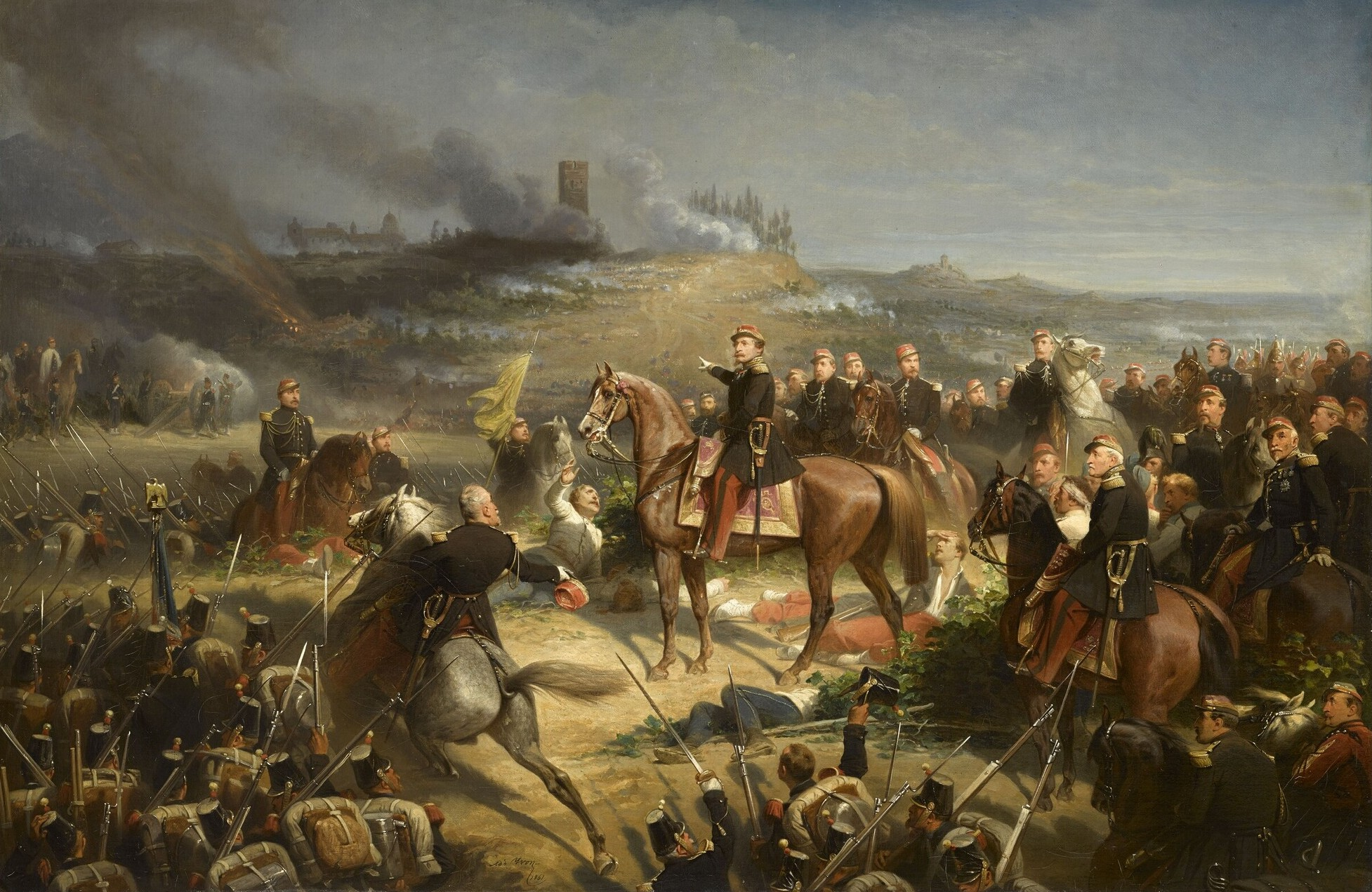
The Battle of Solferino (1861)

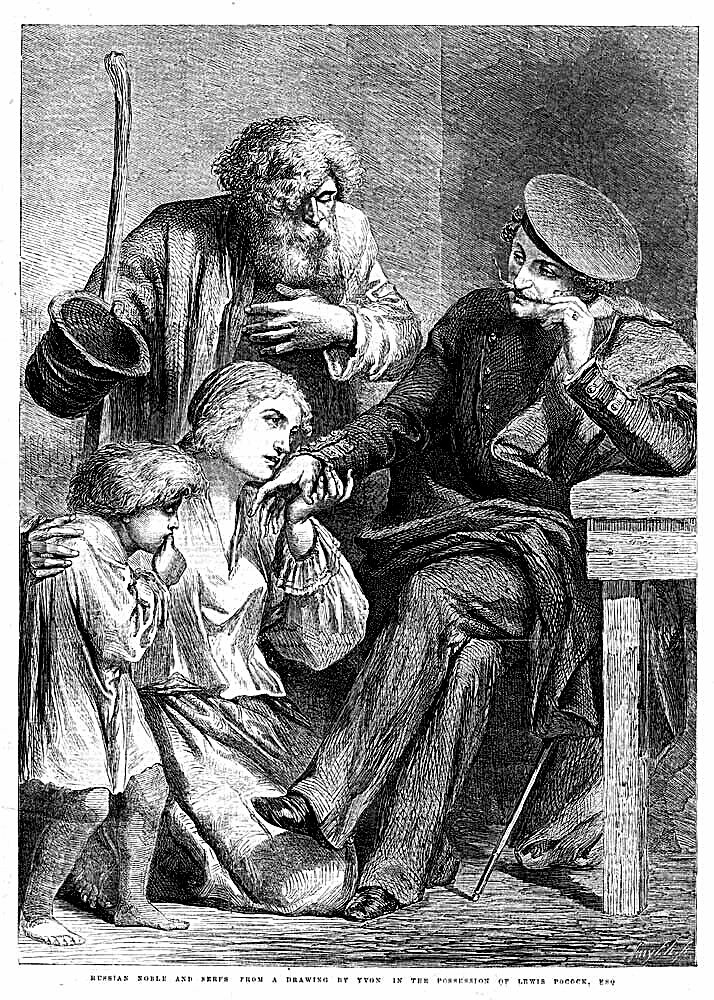
Russian noble and serfs (1861)

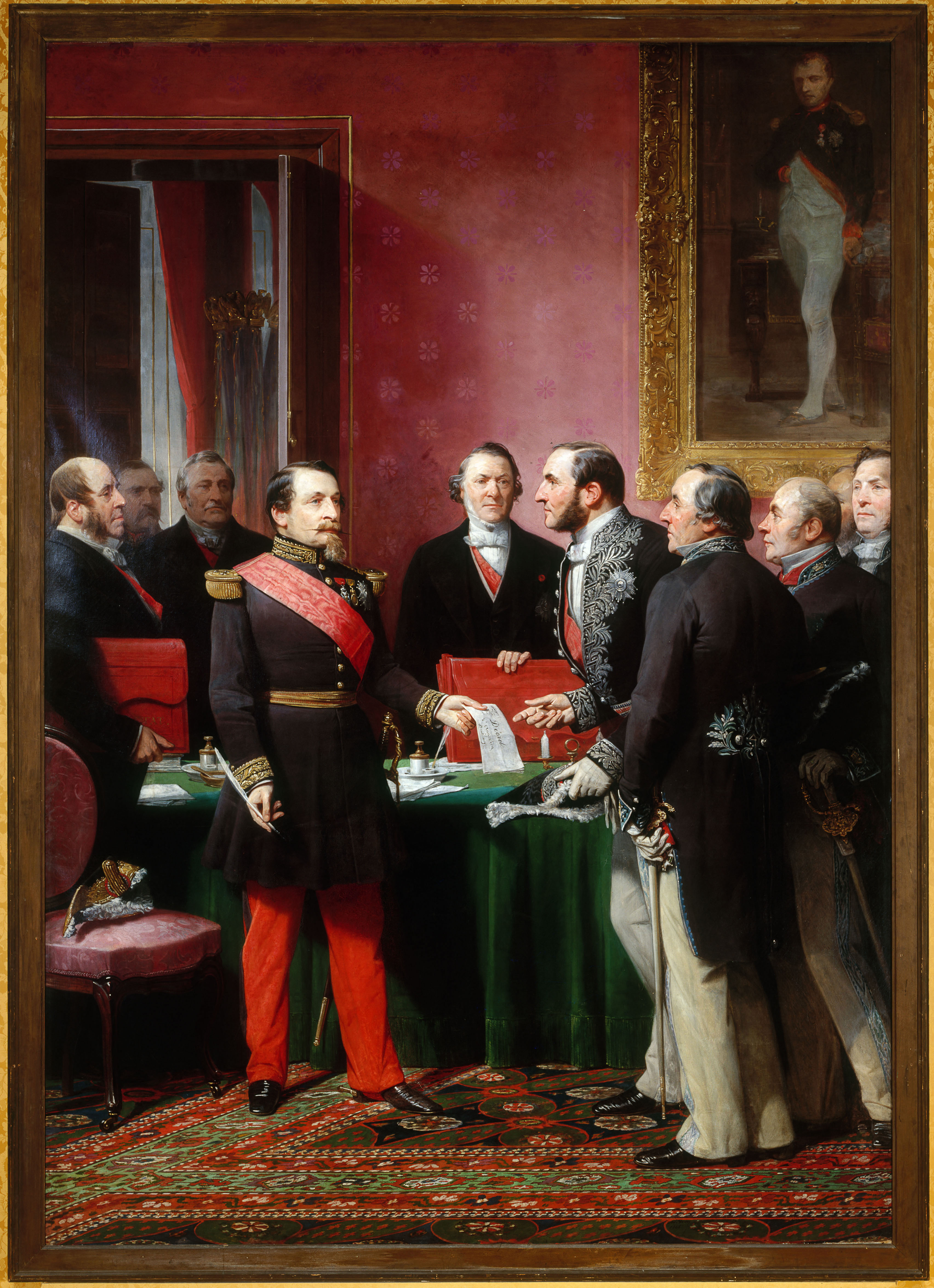
Baron Haussmann Presenting the Annexation Plan to the Emperor (1865)

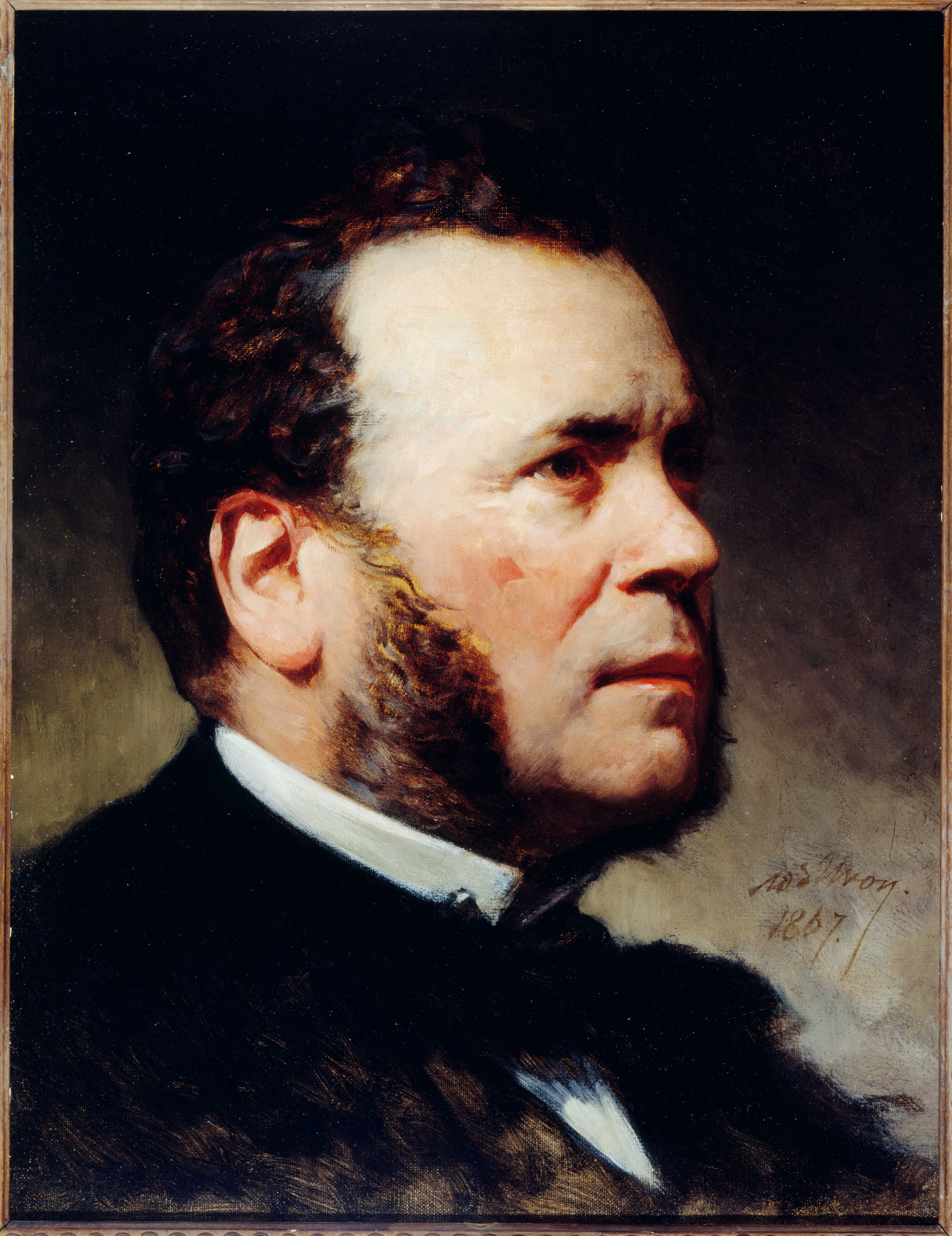
Portrait of Ferdinand Barrot (1867)

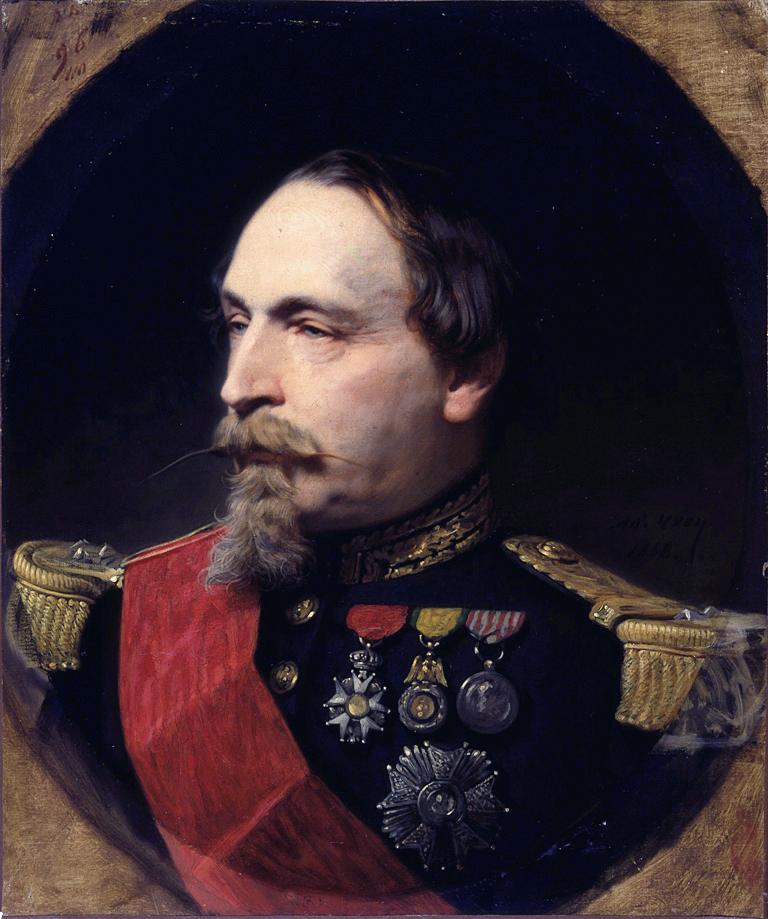
Portrait of Napoleon III (1868). The Walters Art Museum.

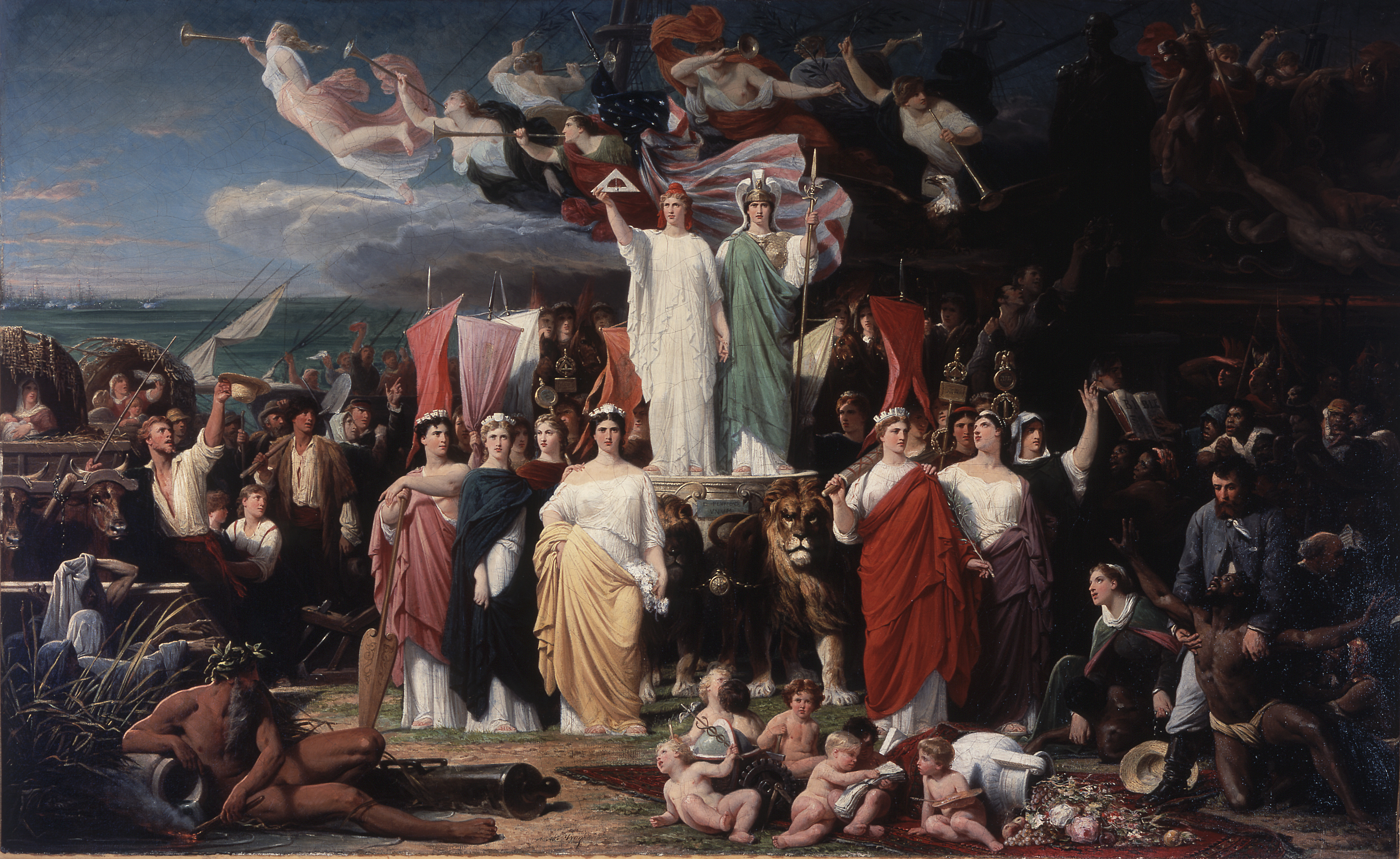
Genius of America (1868)

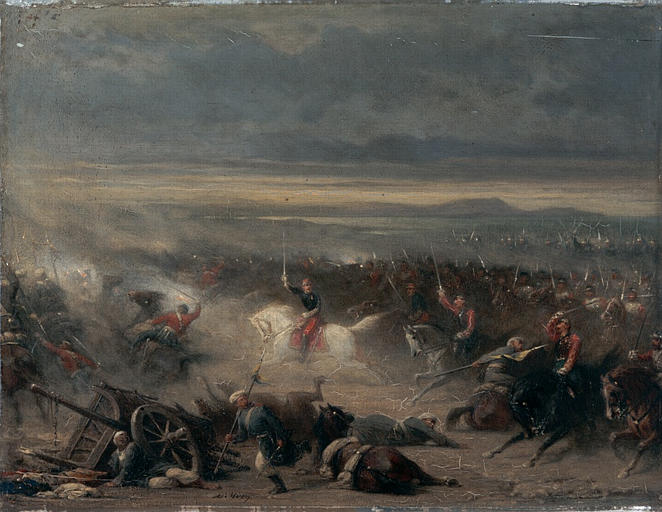
The Battle of Eupatoria (c.1892)

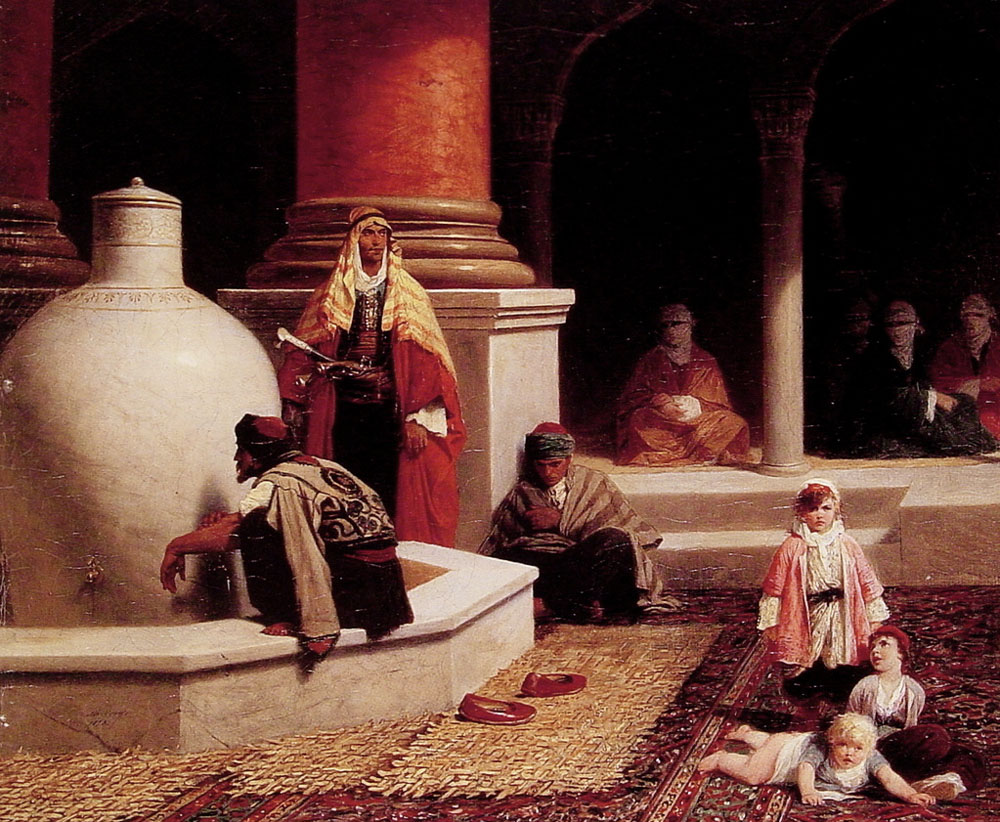
In the Harem (date unknown)

== Paintings ==
- The Assassination of Julius Caesar
- The Charge of the French Cuirassiers at Reichshof
- Marshall Ney at Retreat in Russia
- La Prise de la tour de Malakoff 8 septembre 1855 (Palace of Versailles)
- La Gorge de Malakoff (Palace of Versailles)
- La courtine de Malakoff
- Genius of America (New York State Education Department)
- From Solferino 1863
