= Igor Malakhov =

Russian footballer (1979–2018)

Personal information
- Full name: Igor Vladimirovich Malakhov
- Date of birth: 15 September 1979
- Place of birth: Stavropol, Russian SFSR
- Date of death: 4 November 2018 (aged 39)
- Place of death: Stavropol, Russia
- Height: 1.84 m (6 ft 0 in)
- Position: Goalkeeper

Team information
- Current team: FC Stavropolye-2009

Senior career*
| Years | Team | Apps | (Gls) |
| 1995–1997 | FC Dynamo-d Stavropol | 51 | (0) |
| 1998 | FC Dynamo Stavropol | 0 | (0) |
| 1998 | FC Lokomotiv-Taim Mineralnye Vody | 22 | (0) |
| 1999 | FC Dynamo Stavropol | 0 | (0) |
| 2000–2001 | FC Metallurg Lipetsk | 0 | (0) |
| 2001 | FC Yelets | 14 | (0) |
| 2002 | FC Zhemchuzhina Budyonnovsk | 26 | (0) |
| 2003–2004 | FC Yelets | 46 | (0) |
| 2004 | FC Uralan Elista | 4 | (0) |
| 2005 | FC Yelets | 19 | (0) |
| 2006–2008 | FC Spartak Kostroma | 55 | (0) |
| 2008 | FC Spartak-2 Kostroma (D4) | | |
| 2009 | FC Stavropolye-2009 | 23 | (0) |
- * Club domestic league appearances and goals

Igor Vladimirovich Malakhov (Russian: Игорь Владимирович Малахов; 15 September 1979 – 4 November 2018) was a Russian professional football player.

== Club career ==
He played for the main squad of FC Dynamo Stavropol in the Russian Cup. He played in the Russian Football National League for FC Uralan Elista in 2004.
