= The Capture of the Malakoff Tower =

1858 painting by Horace Vernet

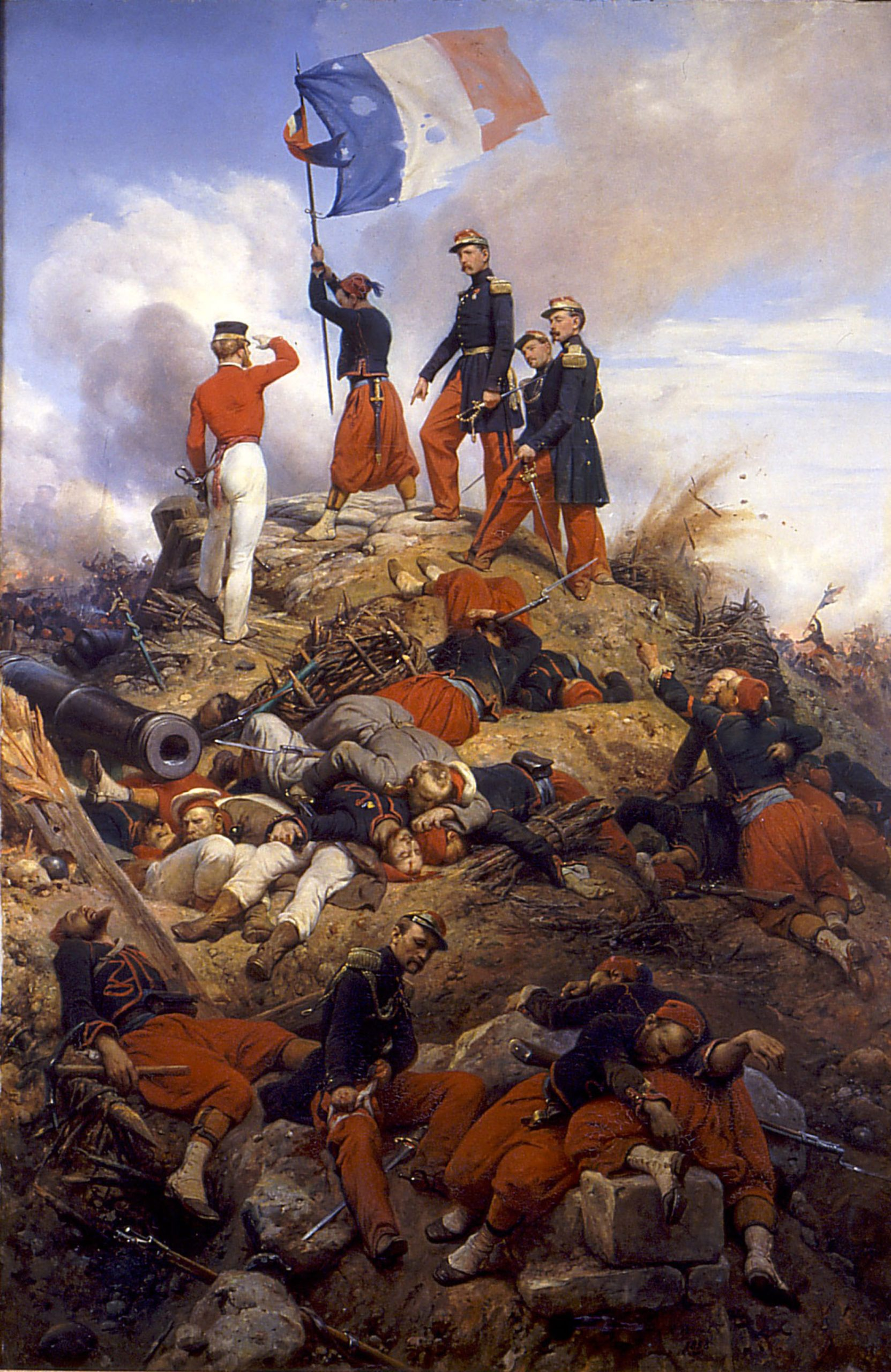
- Artist: Horace Vernet
- Year: 1858
- Type: Oil on canvas, history painting
- Dimensions: 219 cm × 144 cm (86 in × 57 in)
- Location: Musée Rolin, Autun

The Capture of the Malakoff Tower is an oil on canvas painting by Horace Vernet, from 1858. It was commissioned two years earlier by the town council of Autun, in honour of general Patrice de Mac Mahon, born in Saône-et-Loire, and with a distinguished record in the recent Crimean War. It is held in the Musée Rolin, in Autun.

It shows the aftermath of the Battle of Malakoff, with de MacMahon atop a hill as one of his zouaves plants a French flag at the summit. The French general points to the ground, seemingly in response to a salute from a British soldier, but also referring to his famous statement "Here I am, here I stay".
