= Malakhov Kurgan =

Tactically important height in Sevastopol, Crimea

Coordinates: 44.605°N 33.548°E

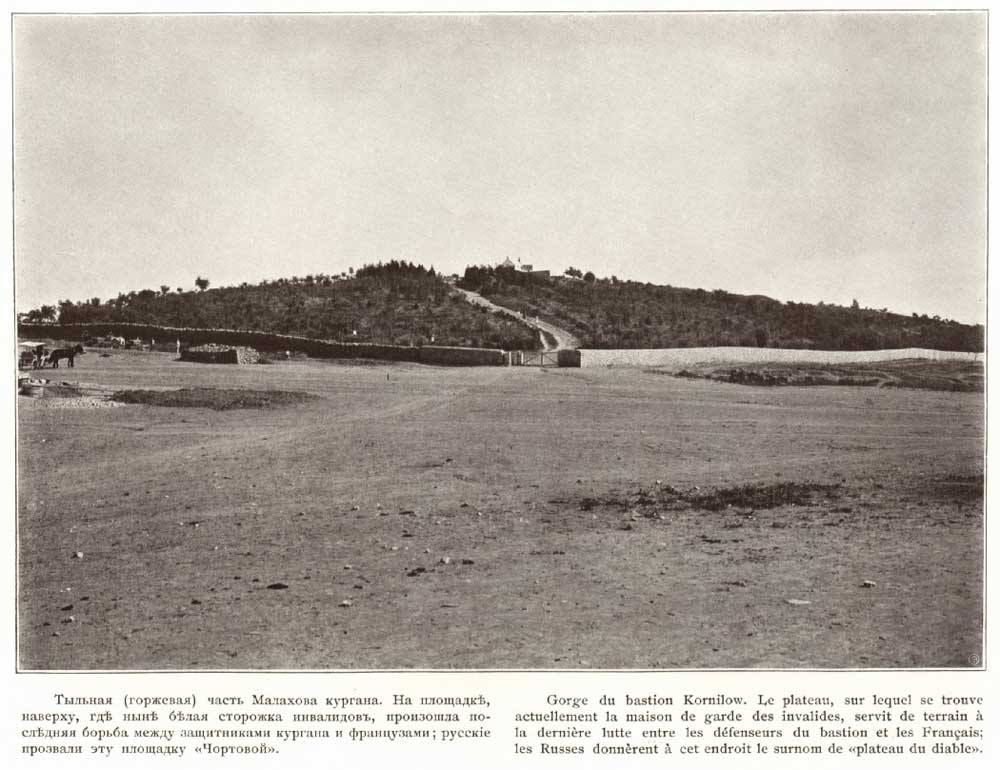
Back side of the Malakhov Kurgan, 1904

Malakhov Kurgan is a tactically important height in the southeastern portion of the Crimean city of Sevastopol. It was fortified and became an important Russian position during the Siege of Sevastopol (1854–1855) in the Crimean War, before it was captured by the French in the Battle of Malakoff. During the Russian Revolution of 1905 it was the site of revolutionary meetings and in the Second World War housed an artillery battery that fought until the end of the Siege of Sevastopol (1941–1942). The site now houses a museum.

== Background ==
The hill lies 4 kilometres (2.5 mi) from the centre of Sevastopol and the kurgan portion of the name reveals an association with an ancient burial ground. The hill overlooks Sevastopol Bay, an important anchorage for the Russian fleet. It is named for captain Mikhail Malakhov. In 1827, Mikhail Malakhov moved from Kherson. In a relatively short time, captain Malakhov gained fame among the lower ranks and the poor as an honest and just man. People came to his house, which was located near the hill with requests and controversial questions. Soon the whole kurgan began to be called by the captain's surname. The name first appeared on Russian maps in 1851.

== Crimean War ==
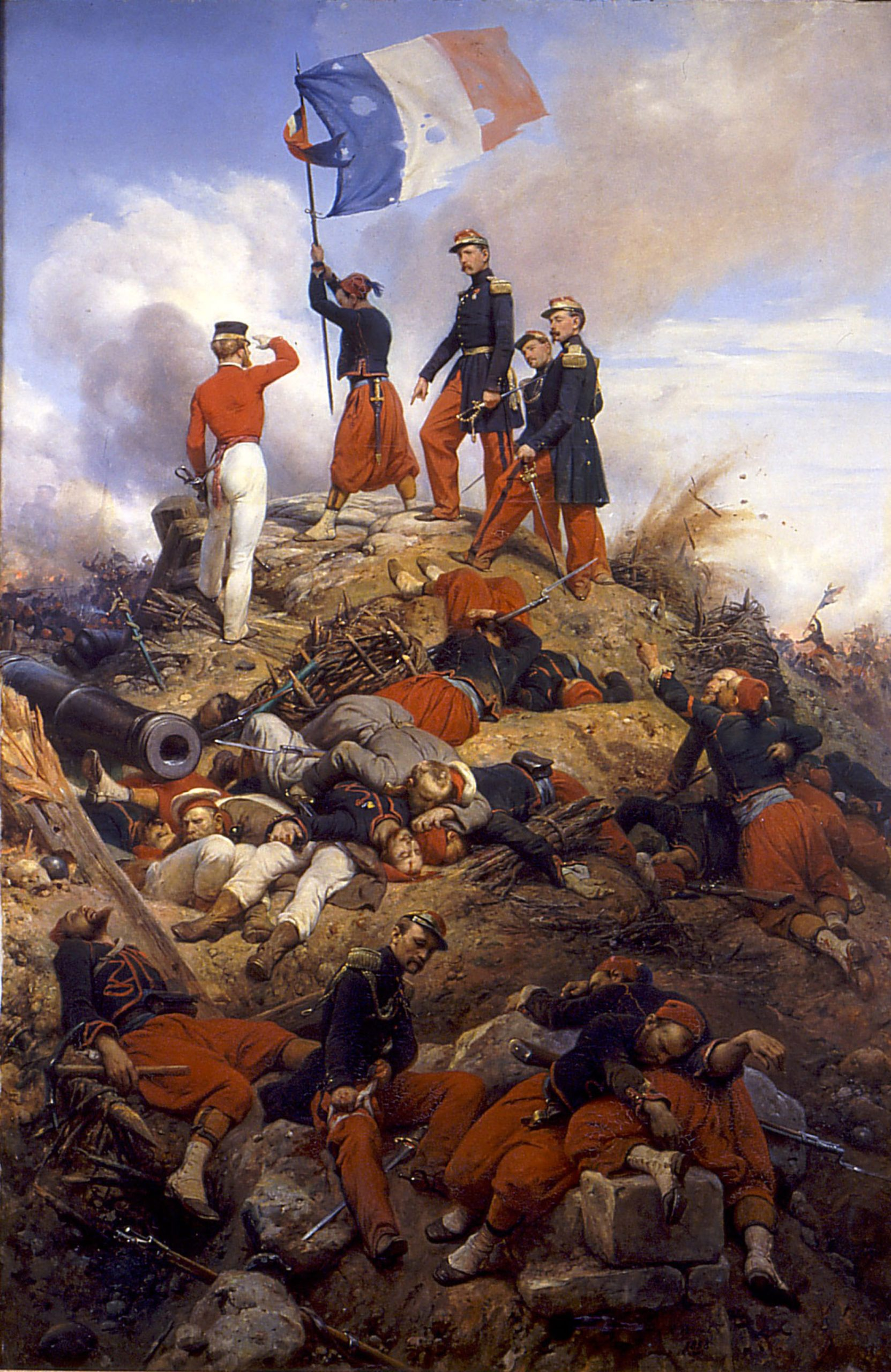
French troops capture the hill.

During the Crimean War a defensive tower was built on the hill in autumn 1854 and it became an important part of the Russian defences against the attacking French and British troops during the Siege of Sevastopol (1854–1855). It was the only defence completed before the commencement of the siege but Russian soldiers eventually erected 9 batteries on the hill, housing 75 guns. The field fortifications erected around the tower became known as the Kornilov bastion after the Russian Vice-Admiral Vladimir Alexeyevich Kornilov who was a commander during the defence and was mortally wounded there in late 1854. Admiral Pavel Nakhimov was later mortally wounded on the hill during the siege.

The hill was attacked by French forces on the night of 9 September [O.S. 28 August] 1855 in the Battle of Malakoff. Although they suffered heavy casualties the French took possession of the hill, forcing the Russians to retreat from the southern part of Sevastopol. After the war memorial plaques were installed on the tower, at the sites of the defence batteries, the locations where the two admirals were killed and over a mass grave. Lieutenant Leo Tolstoy had volunteered to fight in defence of the city and arrived in time to witness the capture of Malakhov Kurgan; he later wrote a short story about the event.

== Later events ==
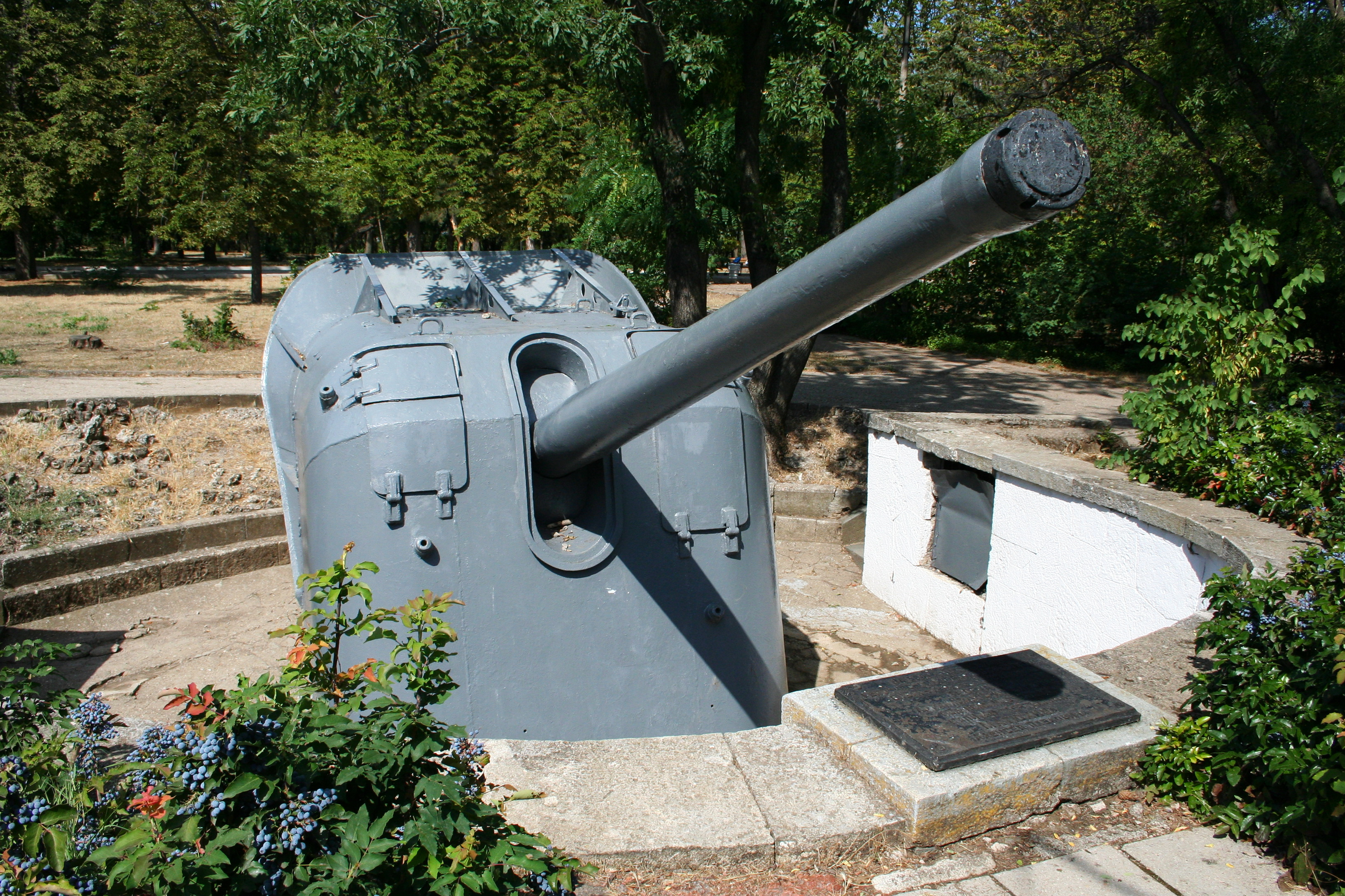
The Second World War gun position

During the Russian Revolution of 1905 revolutionary workers, soldiers and sailors met on the hill and it was in a nearby gully that, in June, sailors from the Black Sea Fleet agreed to mutiny. During the 1917 Russian Revolution three admirals and three other senior officers were executed on the hill by sailors, following a resolution passed by the crew of the destroyer Gadzhibey that condemned them for their anti-revolutionary activity. It afterwards became the site of other revolutionary executions.

Sevastopol was attacked by Axis forces during the Second World War, with a siege starting in late 1941. A battery of two 130 mm guns, salvaged from the harbour bed after being blown off the destroyer Sovershennyy, was established on Malakhov Kurgan in late 1941. With the situation worsening, the Soviet leadership fled the city on 1 July 1942 and German infantry entered. Captain-Lieutenant Aleksei Matyukin, commanding the battery on Malakhov Kurgan, fired on the German forces until he ran out of ammunition, the position was overrun and Matyukhin was captured. Soon after its 1944 liberation by the Soviets, the Russian film Malakhov Kurgan was released telling the story of a widow caught up in the fighting in the final days before the city fell to the Germans.

After the end of the war, proposals by the Russian government to move all Crimean War monuments in Sevastopol to the site and convert it into an outdoor museum were successfully opposed by the local authorities and the Black Sea Fleet. The tower now hosts a small museum. On the day of the formal Russian annexation of Crimea on 18 March 2014, Russian president Vladimir Putin mentioned the Malakhov Kurgan in a speech justifying its seizure.
