= Yevpatoria Bay =

Coordinates: 45°11′33″N 33°22′47″E

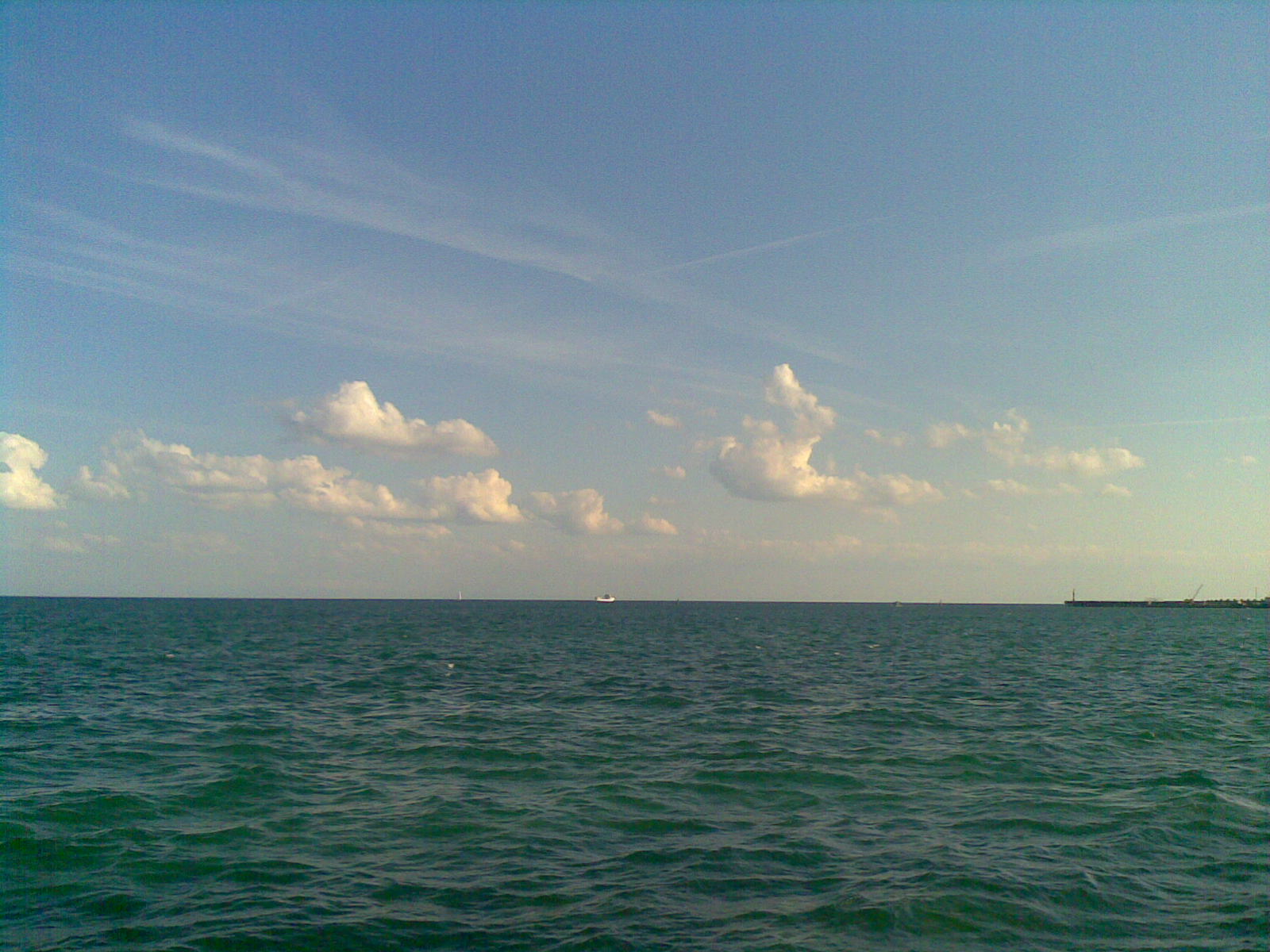

- Location within Crimea
- Location: Black Sea
- Ocean/sea sources: Atlantic Ocean
- Basin countries: Russia/Ukraine
- Max. length: 24 km (15 mi)
- Max. width: 2 km (1.2 mi)
- Average depth: 10 m (33 ft)

Yevpatoria Bay (Russian: Евпаторийская бухта; Ukrainian: Євпаторійська бухта; Crimean Tatar: Kezlev körfezi, Кезлев корьфези) is a bay in the Black Sea near Yevpatoria, Crimea. It forms an arm of the Gulf of Kalamita.

== Characteristics ==
The bay is situated on a geological fault between the Alma Syncline and the Tarkhankut rise. Tectonic movements have formed various depositions within the bay and indicate a relative sea level increase of approximately 2 metres since the 1st millennium BCE. With regard to shipping it is relatively shallow and exposed.
