= Yevpatoria =

City in Crimea

Yevpatoria Євпаторія (Ukrainian) Евпатория (Russian) Kezlev (Crimean Tatar) Кезлев (Crimean Tatar)
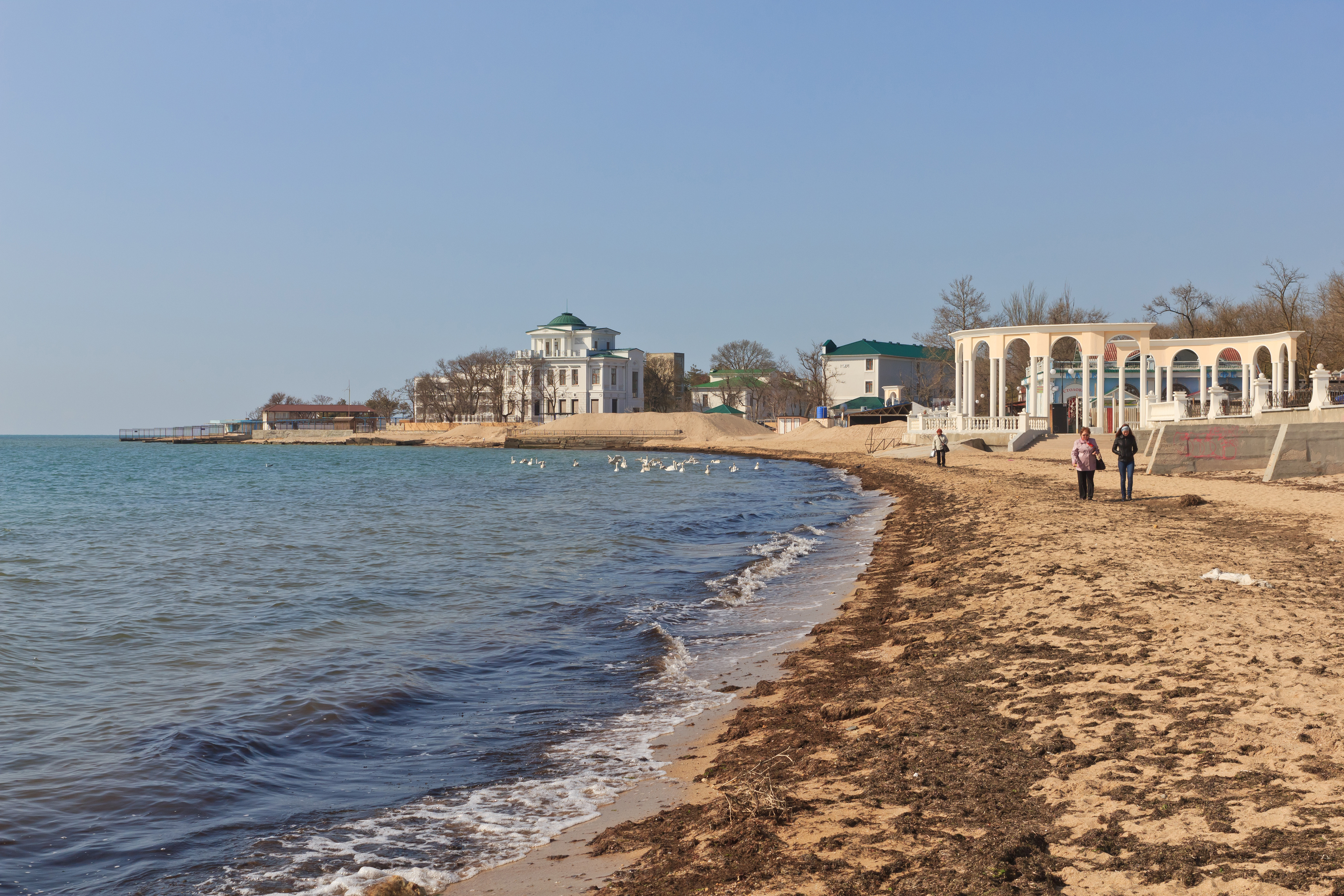
- Black Sea beach in Yevpatoria

- Flag Coat of arms
- Interactive map of Yevpatoria
- Location of Yevpatoria within Crimea Yevpatoria (Ukraine) Yevpatoria (Black Sea)
- Coordinates: 45°11′38″N 33°22′5″E
- Country: Ukraine (occupied by Russia)
- Autonomous republic: Crimea (de jure)
- Raion: Yevpatoria Raion (de jure)
- Federal subject: Crimea (de facto)
- Municipality: Yevpatoria Municipality (de facto)

Area
  - Total: 120 km^{2} (46 sq mi)
- Elevation: 10 m (33 ft)

Population (2014)
  - Total: 105,719
  - Density: 1,618.37/km^{2} (4,191.6/sq mi)
- Time zone: UTC+3 (MSK)
- Postal code: 97400 — 97490
- Area code: +7-36569
- Climate: Cfa
- Website: my-evp.ru (russian site)

Yevpatoria (Ukrainian: Євпаторія, romanized: Yevpatoriia; Russian: Евпатория, romanized: Yevpatoriya; Crimean Tatar: Kezlev, Кезлев; Greek: Ευπατορία, romanized: Eupatoría) is a city in western Crimea, north of Kalamita Bay. Yevpatoria serves as the administrative center of Yevpatoria Municipality, one of the districts (raions) into which Crimea is divided. It had a population of 105,719 (2014 Census).

== History ==
=== Greek settlement ===
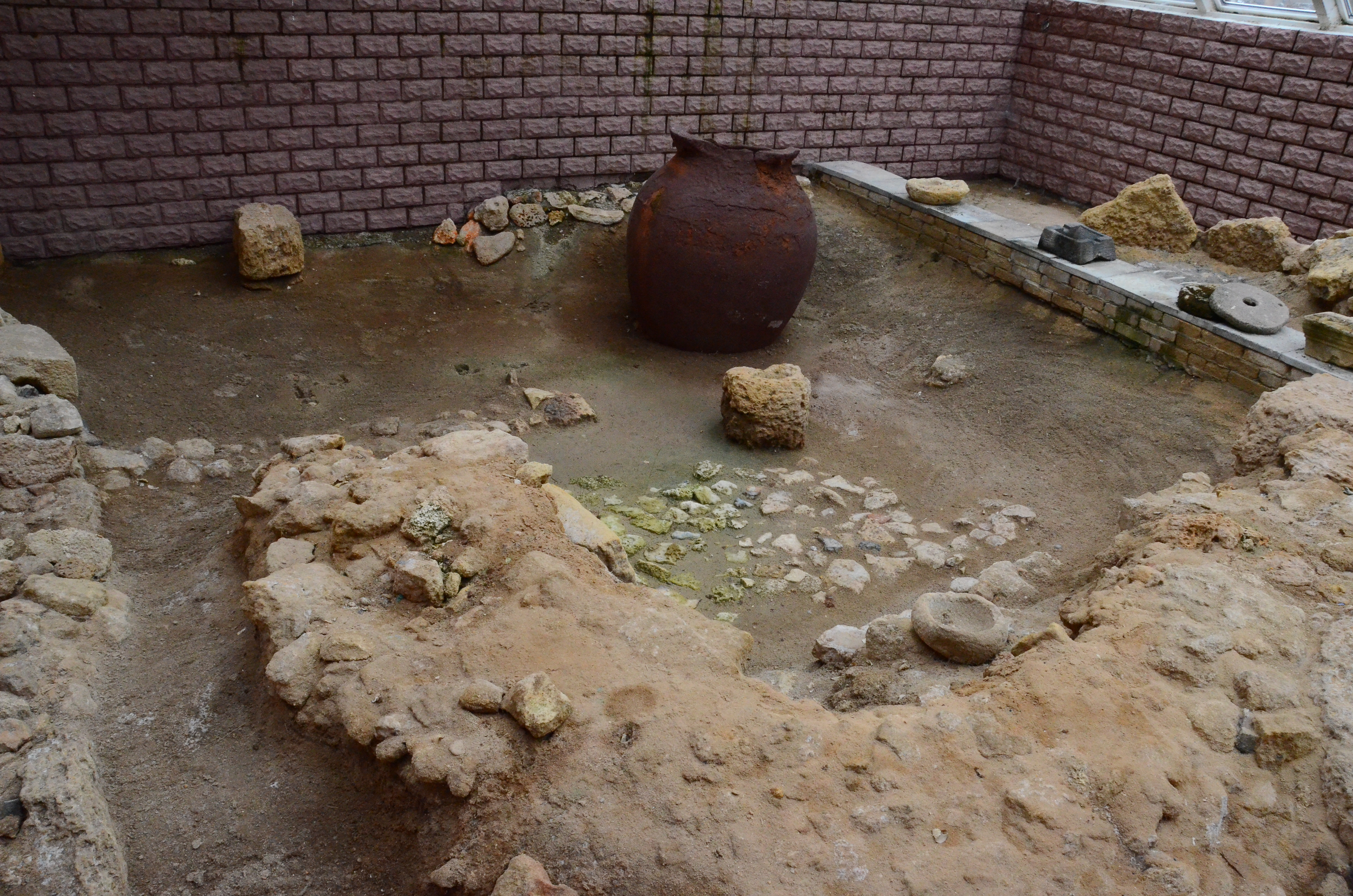
Archaeological excavations of the ancient city of Kerkinitis

The first recorded settlement in the area, called Kerkinitis (Κερκινίτις), was built by Greek colonists around 500 BCE. Along with the rest of the Crimea, Kerkinitis formed part of the dominions of King Mithridates VI Eupator (r. 120–63 BCE). The name of the modern city derives from his nickname, Eupator ('of a noble father').

=== Khanate period ===
From roughly the 7th through the 10th centuries, Yevpatoria was a Khazar settlement; its name in Khazar language was probably Güzliev (literally 'beautiful house'). It was later subject to the Cumans (Kipchaks), the Mongols, and the Crimean Khanate. During this period the city was called Kezlev by Crimean Tatars and Gözleve by Ottoman Turks. The Russian medieval name Kozlov is a Russification of the Crimean Tatar name. For a short period between 1478 and 1485, the city was administered by the Ottoman Empire. Afterward, it became an important urban center of the Crimean Khanate.

The 400-year-old Juma-Jami Mosque is one of the many designed by the Ottoman architect Mimar Sinan. It was built in 1552-1564. 35-metre minarets rose on the flanks of the building. The mosque was of great state significance. It was here that a ceremony of the declaration of rights of the Crimean Khans was held at their enthronement. Only after that did they go to their capital, the city of Bakhchysarai.

Yevpatoria became a residence of the spiritual ruler of the Crimean Karaites, the Ḥakham. In this connection, a complex of two prayer houses was built under the supervision of the Rabovich brothers, in which the Renaissance and Muslim architectural styles entwined in a most unusual manner. The ensemble organically incorporates three courtyards. The entrance to it is marked by gates, built in 1900, which look like a refined triumphal arch.

=== Imperial Russian rule ===
In 1783, along with the rest of Crimea, Kezlev was captured by the Russian Empire. Its name was officially changed to Yevpatoriya in 1784. This spelling of the city name came to the French, German, Spanish, and English languages at the end of the 18th сentury.

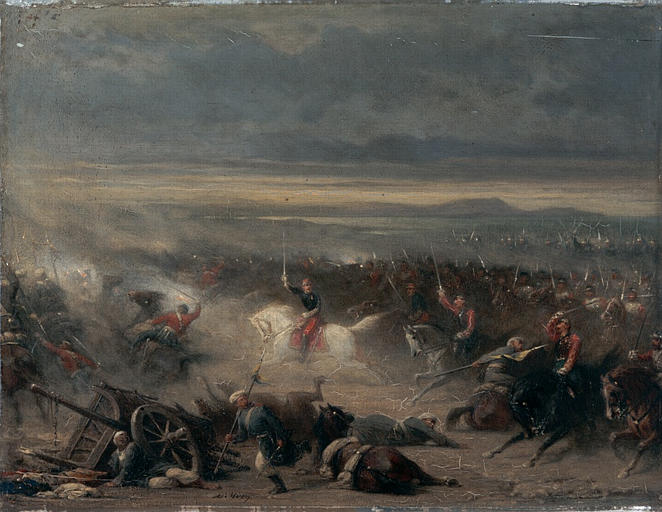
The Battle of Eupatoria of 1855, depicted by Adolphe Yvon

Polish poet Adam Mickiewicz visited the town in 1825 and wrote one of his Crimean Sonnets here.

The city was occupied in September 1854 by British, French and Turkish troops during the Crimean War prior to the Allied landing in Kalamita Bay, after which the Battle of the Alma south of the bay followed. It became a garrison of Ottoman troops later during the war and was the site of the Battle of Eupatoria in February 1855, which was the largest military clash in the Crimean theatre outside the Sevastopol area.

=== Soviet rule ===
Natural factors at Yevpatoria created beneficial conditions for the treatment of osteoarticular tuberculosis and other children's diseases; in 1933, at a scientific conference in Yalta, it was agreed that among Soviet resort towns for the organization of children's resorts, most people approved Yevpatoria. In 1936, the Soviet government placed the All-Union children's resort in Yevpatoria. In 1938, the approved plan of a general reconstruction of the city.

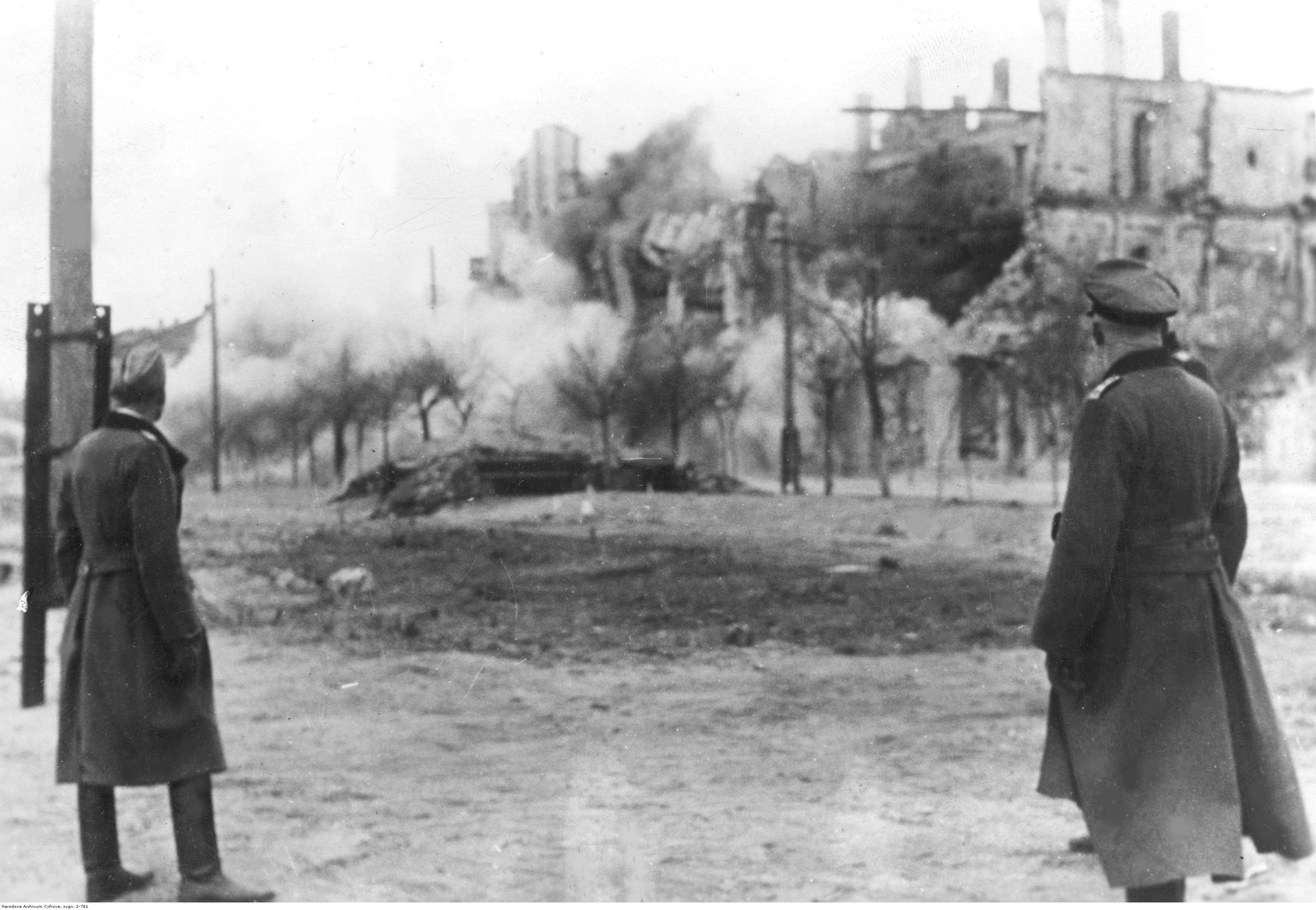
German occupation of Yevpatoria in 1942

During World War II, sanatoriums were used as military hospitals. By 1 July 1945, Yevpatoria operated 14 sanatoriums, and have taken 2,885 people. By the 1980s, the city operated 78 sanatoriums for 33 thousand people.

=== Independent Ukraine and Russian annexation ===
On 24 December 2008, a blast destroyed a five-story building in the town. 27 people were killed. President of Ukraine Viktor Yushchenko declared 26 December to be a day of national mourning.

Two beaches in Yevpatoria have been Blue Flag beaches since May 2010, these were the first beaches (with two beaches in Yalta) to be awarded a Blue Flag in a CIS member state.

In 2014 due to the military operation of the Russian Armed forces, the city of Yevpatoria was occupied by Russia along with the entire Crimean peninsula. The UN General Assembly condemned the Russian operation and considered the annexation the temporary occupation of part of the territory of Ukraine—the Autonomous Republic of Crimea and the City of Sevastopol.

Today, Yevpatoria is a major Black Sea port, a rail hub, and a resort town. The main industries of the city include fishing, food processing, winemaking, limestone quarrying, weaving, manufacturing, machinery, furniture manufacturing, and tourism.

Yevpatoria has spas of mineral water, salt, and mud lakes. These resorts belong to a vast area with curative facilities where the main health-improving factors are the sunshine and sea, air and sand, brine and mud of the salt lakes, as well as the mineral water of the hot springs. The curative qualities of the local mud was witnessed by the manuscripts of Pliny the Elder, a Roman scholar (c. 80 BC).

== Economy ==
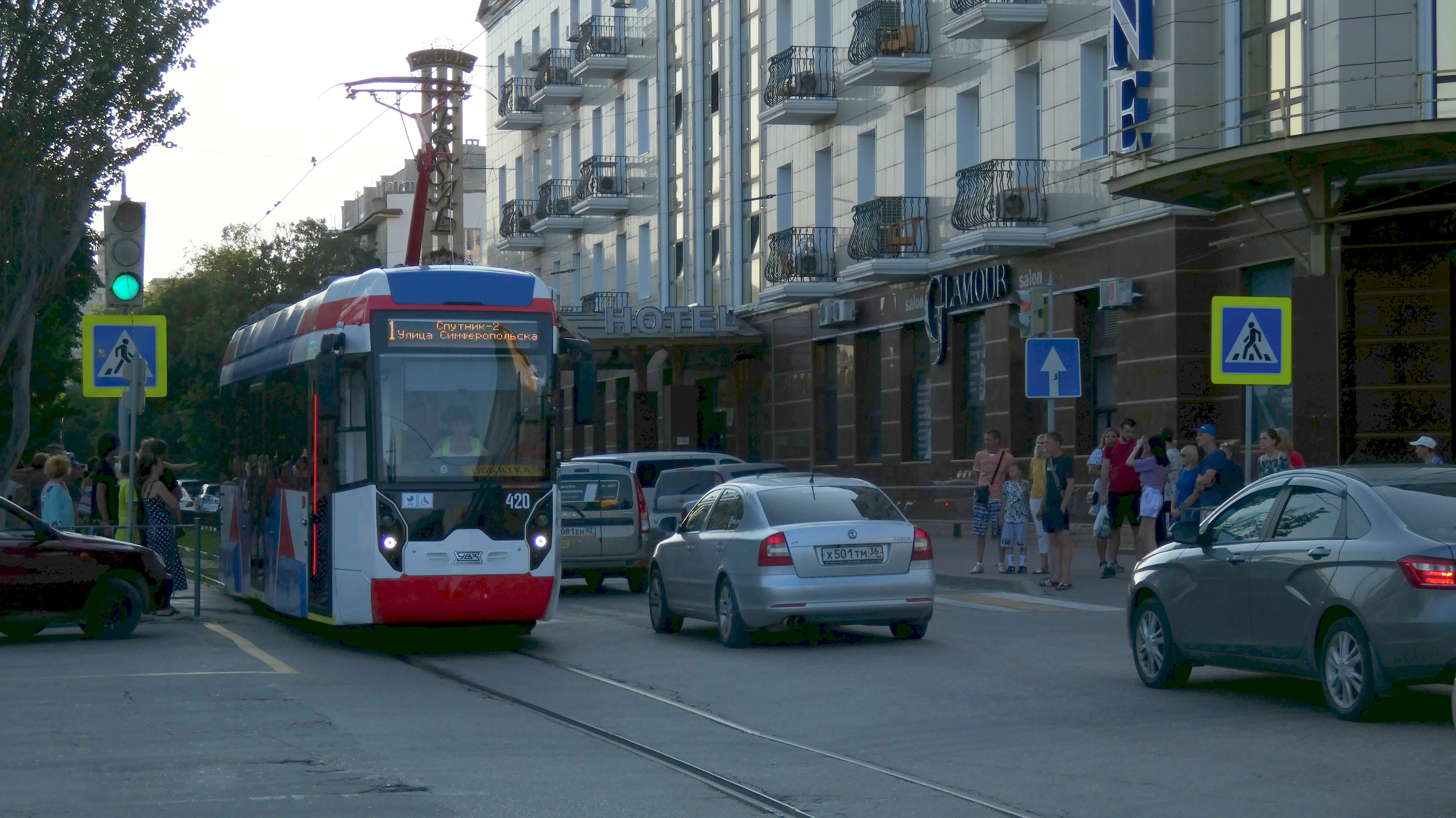
71-411 tram.

- Industry, Engineering
- Agriculture
- AO Vympel NPO (MicroElectronics and Electronics, circuits microchips IC, Electrical parts, connectors, optoelectronics television and other devices and machinery, metallurgy engineering technology)
- Eupatoria Aircraft Plant and Repair EupAZ EARZ (An, Mi, Ka, Su, MiG, Yak, Il, Be, Tu; An-22, Su-25, MiG-31, Yak-38, Be-12, transport aircraft and amphibious)
- Construction, Building

== Education ==
- Institute of Social Sciences (Branch), Crimean Federal University

== Demographics ==
Historical population
Year	Pop.	±%
1897	17,900	—
1926	23,300	+30.2%
1939	47,030	+101.8%
1959	56,992	+21.2%
1970	79,444	+39.4%
1979	93,281	+17.4%
1989	107,792	+15.6%
2001	105,915	−1.7%
2014	105,719	−0.2%
2021	107,877	+2.0%
Source: Census data

Ethnic composition of Yevpatoria in 2001 according to the Ukrainian census:

1. Russians: 64,9%
2. Ukrainians: 23,3%
3. Crimean Tatars: 6,9%
4. Belarusians: 1,5%
5. Armenians: 0,5%
6. Jews: 0,4%
7. Tatars (excluding Crimean Tatars): 0,2%
8. Poles: 0,2%
9. Moldovans: 0,2%
10. Azerbaijanis: 0,2%

== Geography ==
=== Climate ===
Yevpatoria has a humid subtropical climate (Cfa) under the Köppen climate classification with cool winters and warm to hot summers.

Climate data for Yevpatoria (1981–2010)
Month	Jan	Feb	Mar	Apr	May	Jun	Jul	Aug	Sep	Oct	Nov	Dec	Year
Mean daily maximum °C (°F)	4.4 (39.9)	4.9 (40.8)	8.3 (46.9)	14.6 (58.3)	20.7 (69.3)	25.7 (78.3)	28.9 (84.0)	28.8 (83.8)	23.1 (73.6)	16.9 (62.4)	10.5 (50.9)	6.1 (43.0)	16.1 (61.0)
Daily mean °C (°F)	1.5 (34.7)	1.6 (34.9)	4.6 (40.3)	10.3 (50.5)	15.9 (60.6)	21.0 (69.8)	23.9 (75.0)	23.6 (74.5)	18.4 (65.1)	12.7 (54.9)	7.0 (44.6)	3.2 (37.8)	12.0 (53.6)
Mean daily minimum °C (°F)	−1.1 (30.0)	−1.3 (29.7)	1.7 (35.1)	6.8 (44.2)	12.0 (53.6)	17.0 (62.6)	19.5 (67.1)	19.0 (66.2)	14.2 (57.6)	9.0 (48.2)	4.1 (39.4)	0.6 (33.1)	8.5 (47.3)
Average precipitation mm (inches)	30.5 (1.20)	31.1 (1.22)	28.9 (1.14)	29.3 (1.15)	25.1 (0.99)	39.7 (1.56)	31.1 (1.22)	41.4 (1.63)	46.4 (1.83)	33.6 (1.32)	38.8 (1.53)	37.5 (1.48)	413.4 (16.28)
Average precipitation days (≥ 1.0 mm)	6.5	6.3	6.4	4.7	5.0	5.2	3.5	4.1	5.2	4.8	6.7	6.6	65.0
Average relative humidity (%)	83.4	80.8	78.2	74.1	71.8	70.2	64.8	63.9	70.2	76.8	81.9	83.3	75.0
Source: NOAA

== Area attractions ==
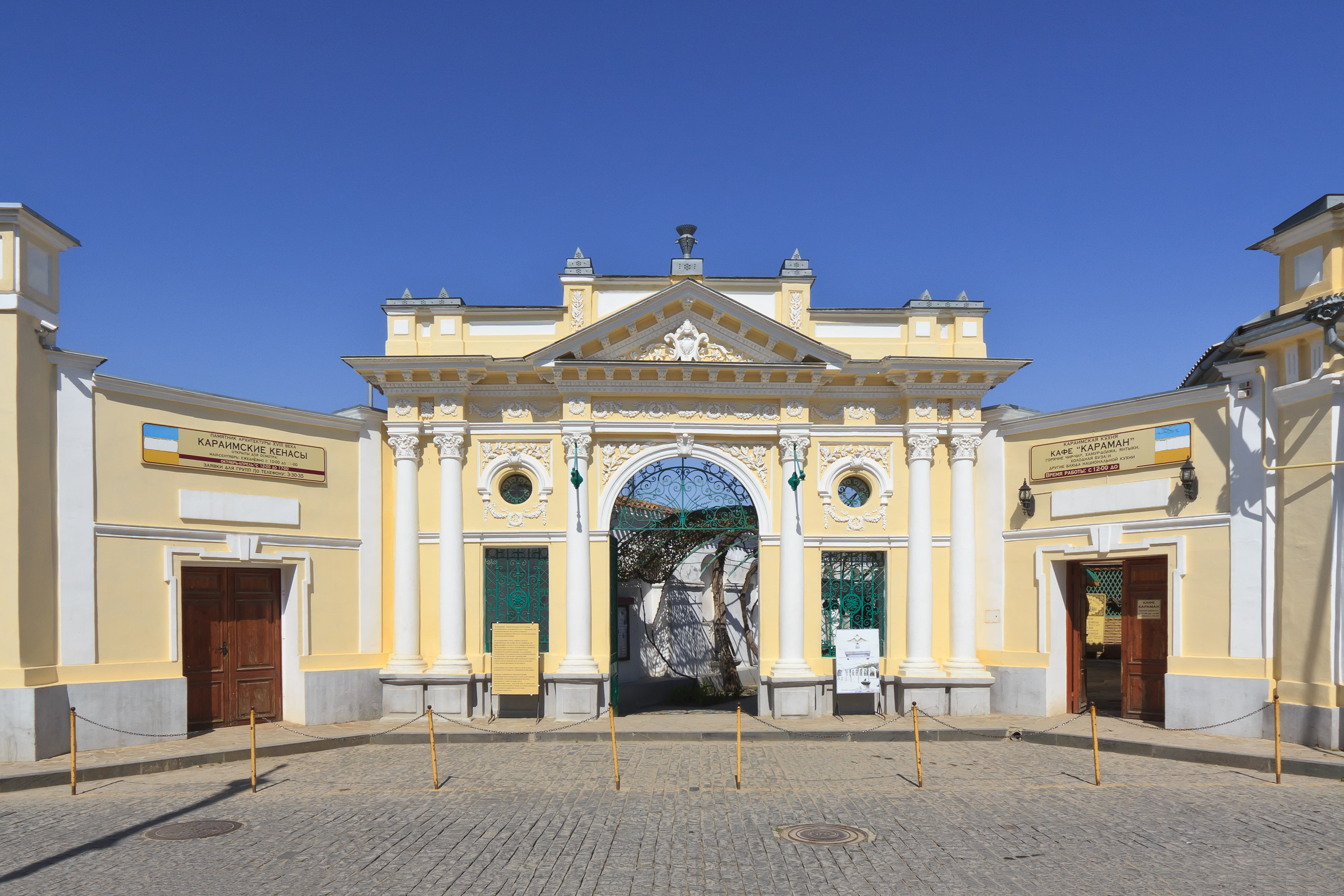
Entrance to one of the Eupatorian Kenassas

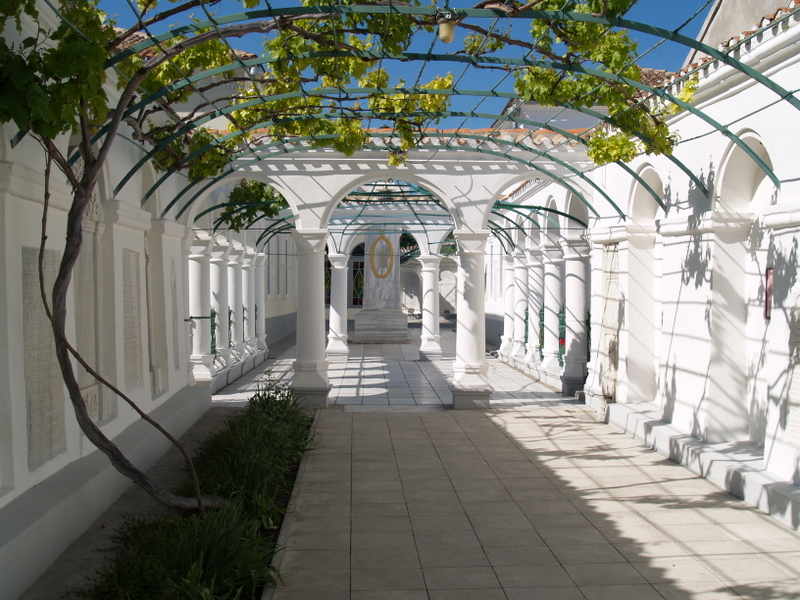
Garden at the Karaite Kenasa

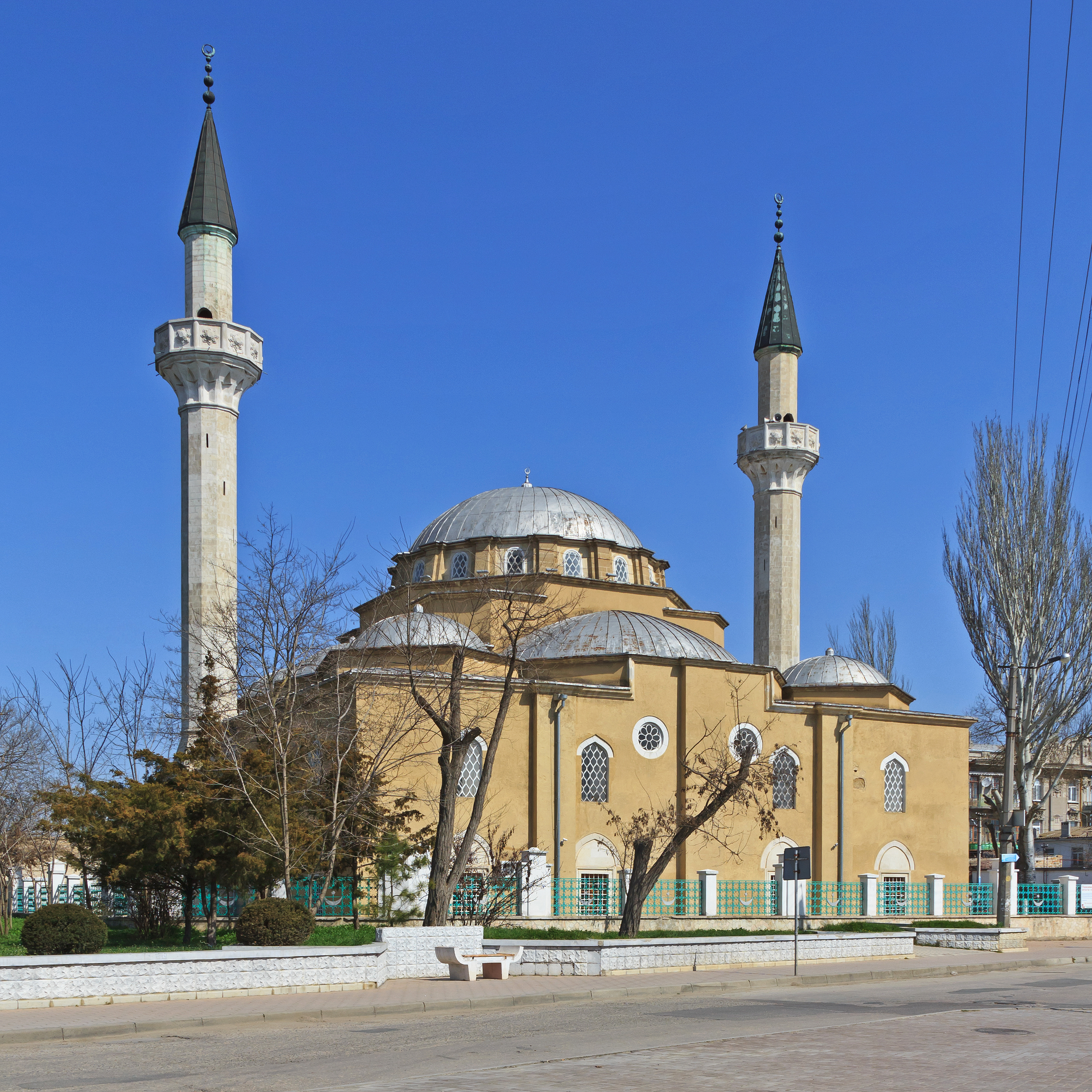
Juma-Jami Mosque

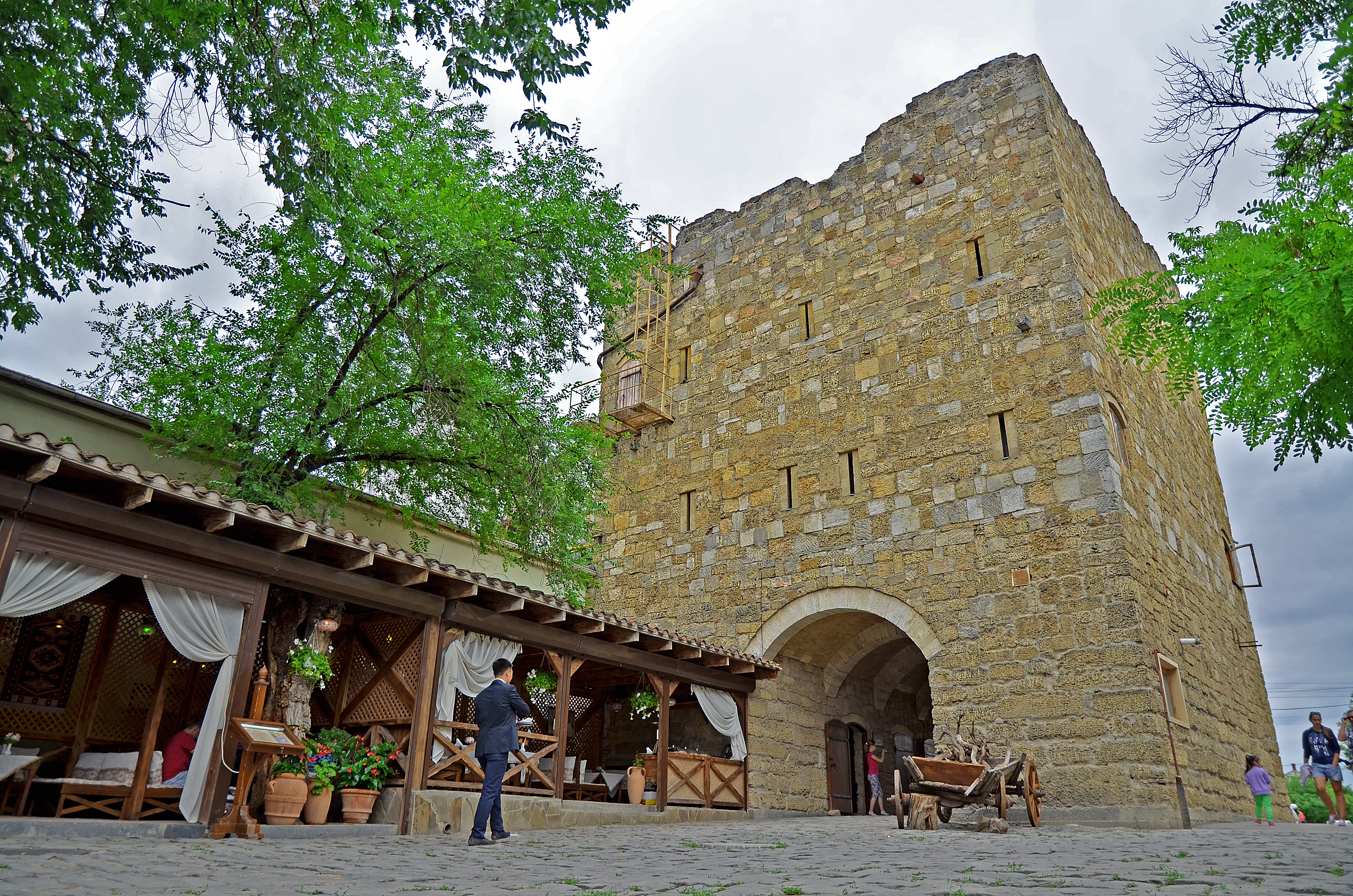
Odun-Bazar-Kapusu

Famous attractions within or near Yevpatoria are:

- Juma-Jami Mosque designed in 1552 by Mimar Sinan
- Eupatorian Kenassas
- St. Nicholas' the Miracle Worker Cathedral
- Tekie Dervishes

== Notable people ==
- Denys Andriyenko (born 1980), Ukrainian football player
- Lyudmila Alexeyeva (1927-2018), Soviet and Russian human rights activist
- Borys Babin (born 1981), Ukrainian politician
- Vitalii Bezghin (born 1990), Ukrainian politician, who is currently serving as the Minister of Communities and Territories Development
- Oleksandr Davydov (1912-1993), Soviet and Ukrainian physicist
- Semyon Douvan (1870-1957), City Mayor and Duma Deputy 1905-1919
- Maria Gorokhovskaya (1921-2001), Russian-born Soviet gymnast
- Nikolaos Himonas (Nikolai Khimona) (1864-1929), painter of Greek descent
- Zula Pogorzelska (1896-1936), Polish cabaret and film actress
- Kseniya Simonova (born 1985), Ukrainian sand animator
- Sergei Sokolov (1911-2012), Russian-born Soviet Marshal
- Ruslana Taran (born 1970), Ukrainian sailor
- Vitya Vronsky (1909-1992), Russian-born American pianist

== Names of asteroid number 6489 and number 24648 ==
Asteroid number 6489 has the name Golevka, which has a complicated origin. In 1995, Golevka was studied simultaneously by three radar observatories across the world: Goldstone in California, Eupatoria RT-70 radio telescope (Yevpatoriya is sometimes romanized as Evpatoria or Eupatoria (Russian origin), and Kashima in Japan. 'Gol-Ev-Ka' comes from the first few letters of each observatory's name; it was proposed by the discoverer following a suggestion by Alexander L. Zaitsev.

Asteroid 24648 Evpatoria was discovered on September 19, 1985, by Nikolai Chernykh and Lyudmila Chernykh at the Crimean Astrophysical Observatory, and named in honor of Evpatoria (transliteration from Russian to English). The minor planet marked the occasion of the 2500th anniversary of the town in 2003.

== Twin towns – sister cities ==
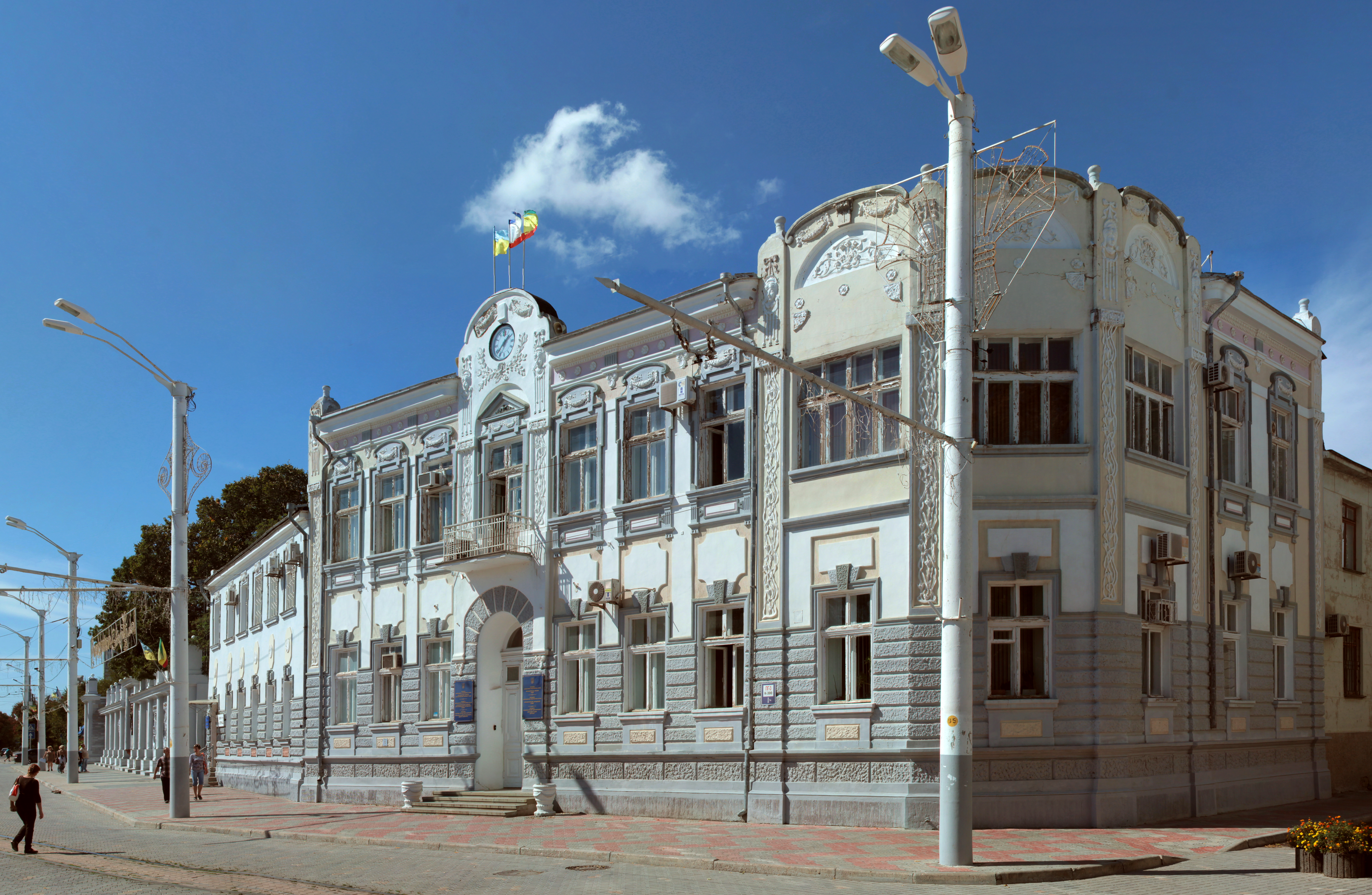
City council

Arms	City	Nation	Since
	Ioannina	Greece	1989
	Figueira da Foz	Portugal	1989
	Ludwigsburg	Germany	1992
	Zakynthos	Greece	2002
	Ostrowiec Świętokrzyski	Poland	2004
	Krasnogorsky District	Russia	2006
	Lambie	Greece	2009
	Belgorod	Russia	2010

== Gallery ==
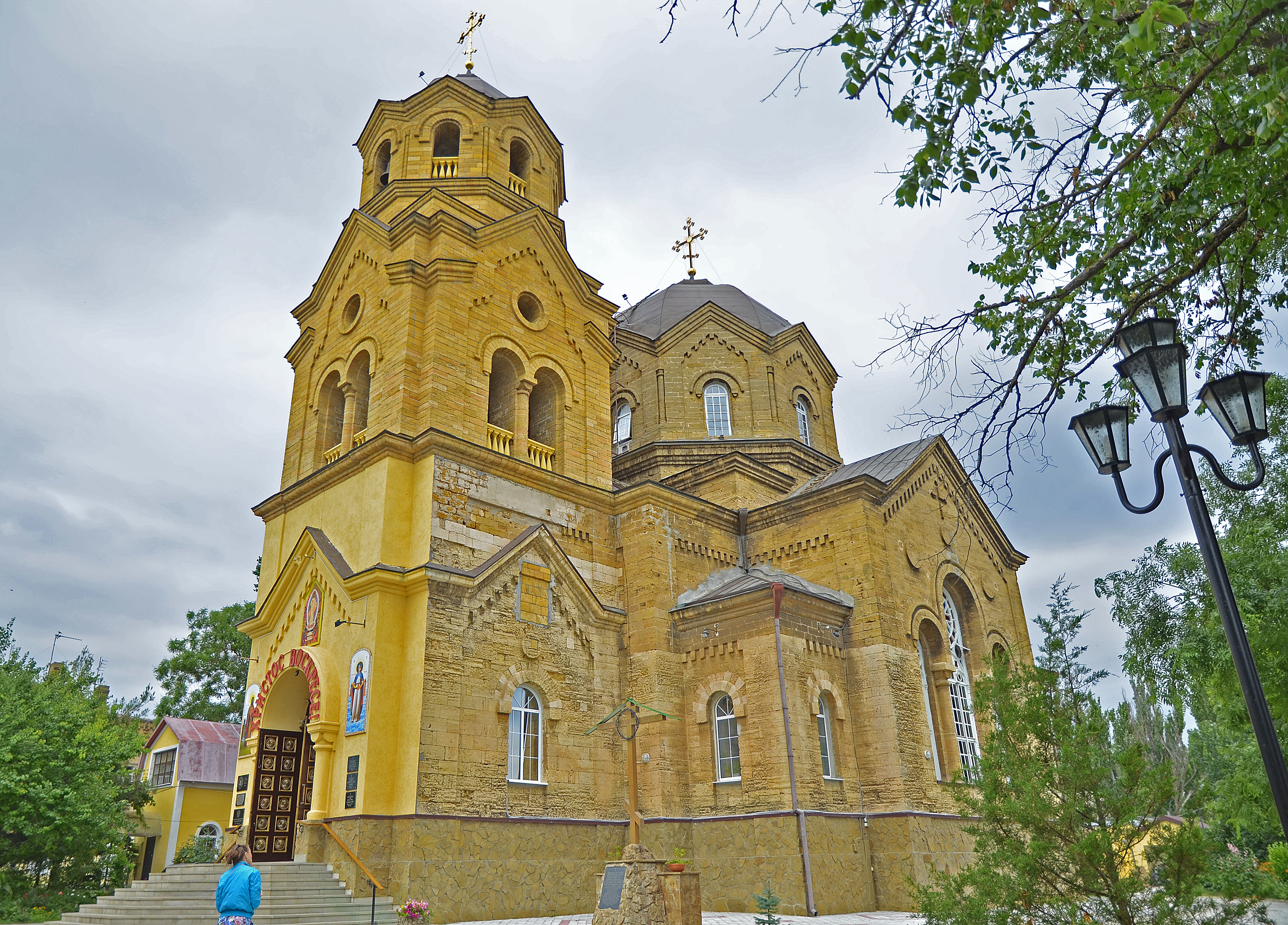
Greek church

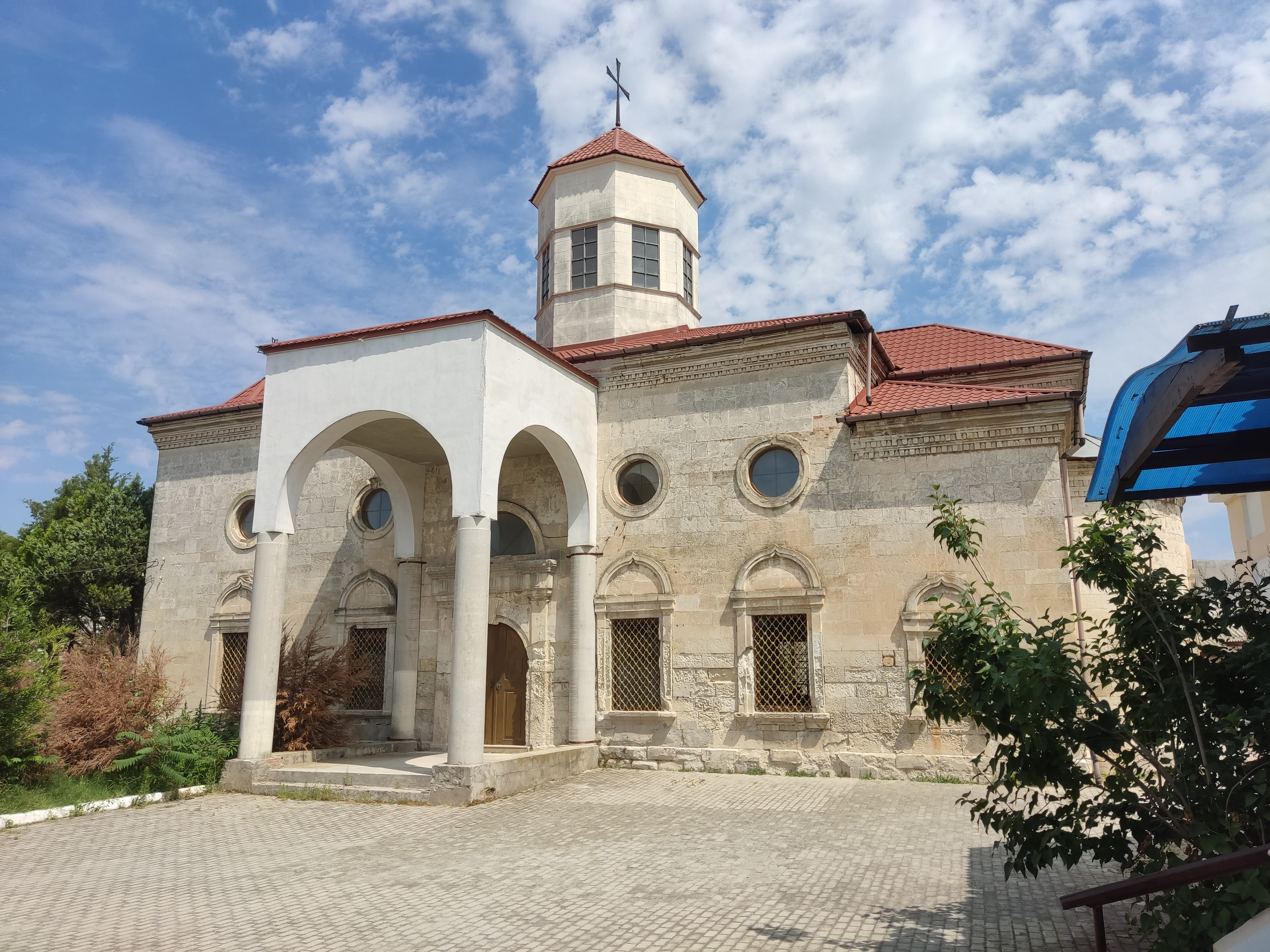
Armenian church

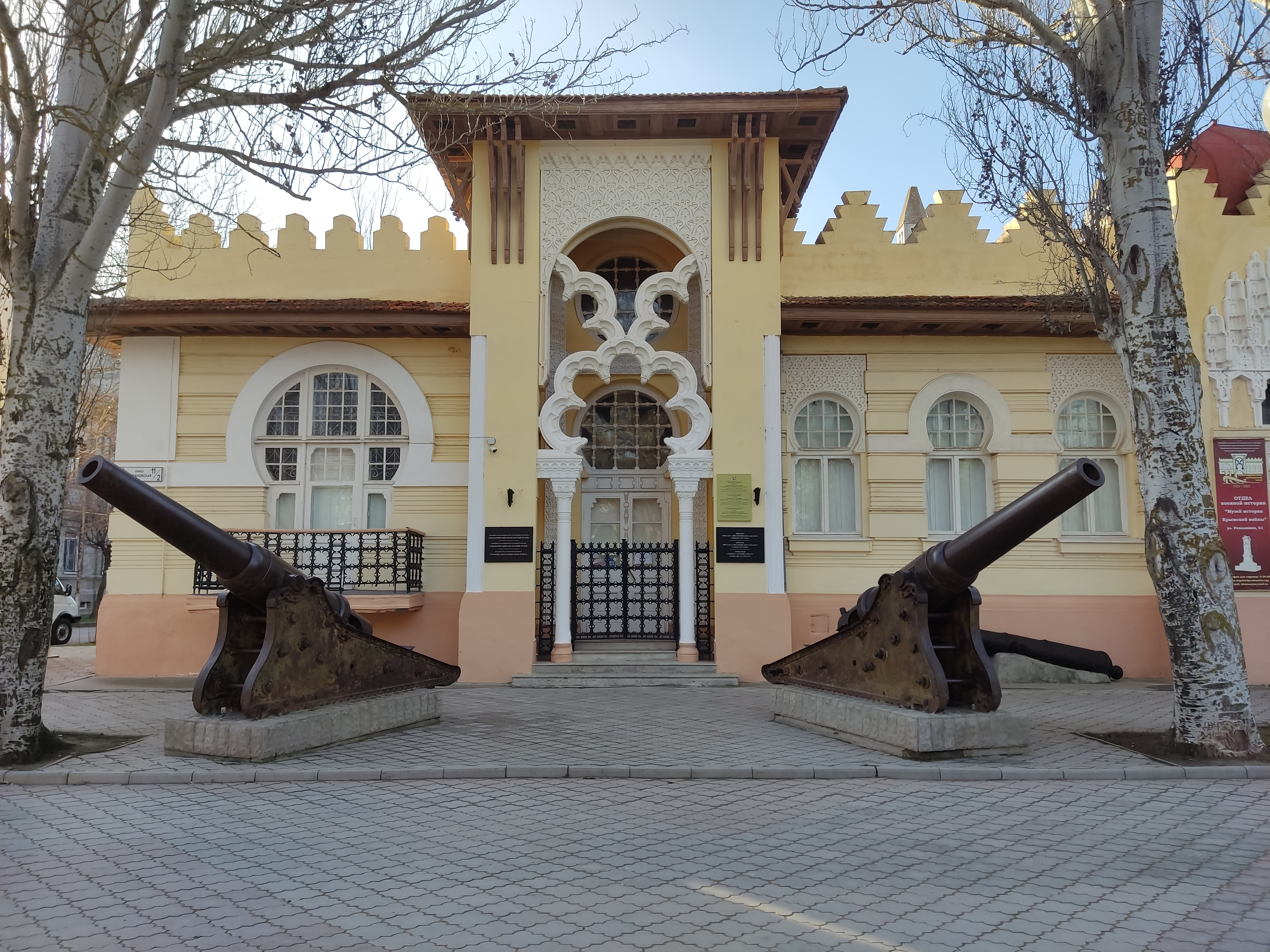
Local History Museum

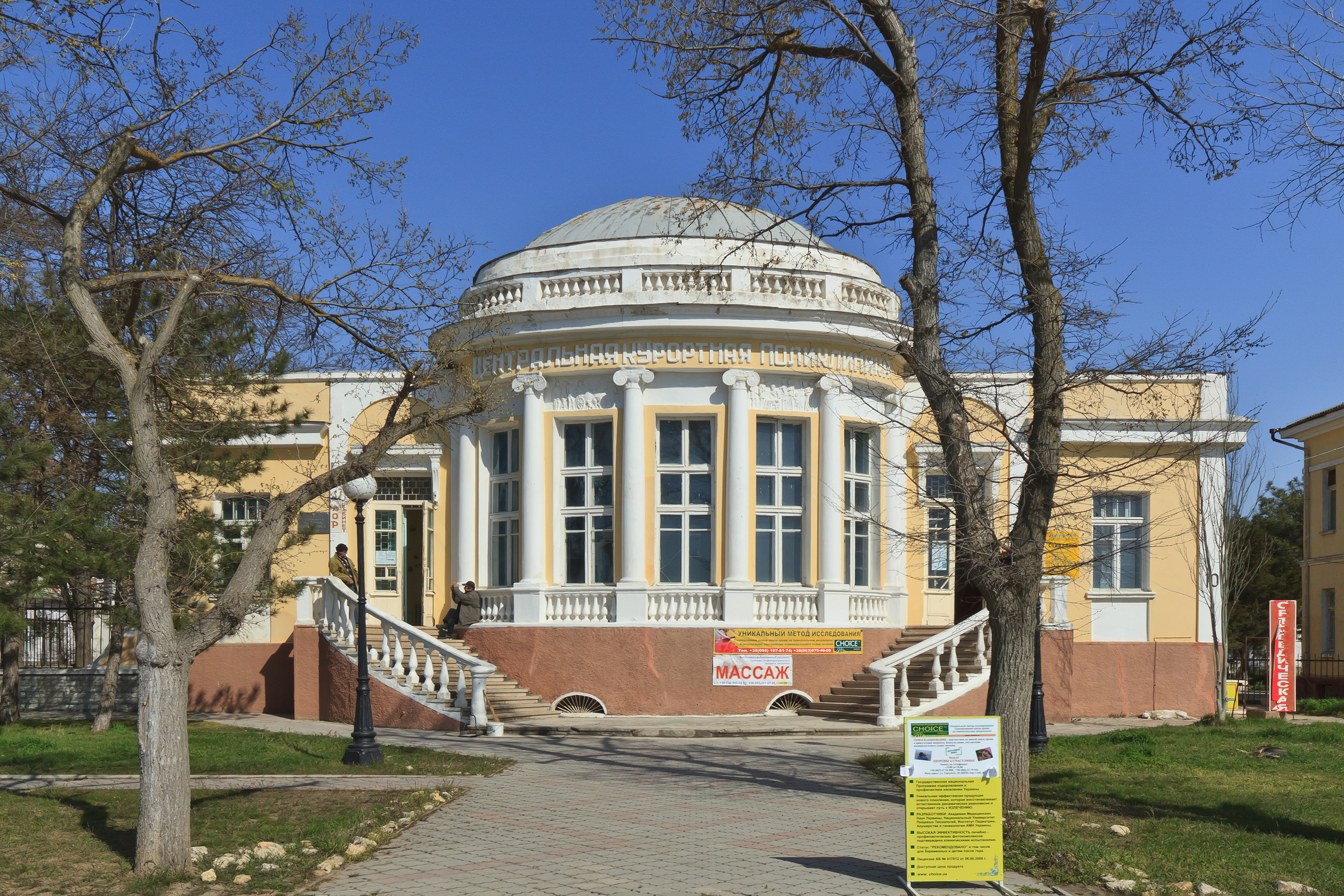
Central resort polyclinic

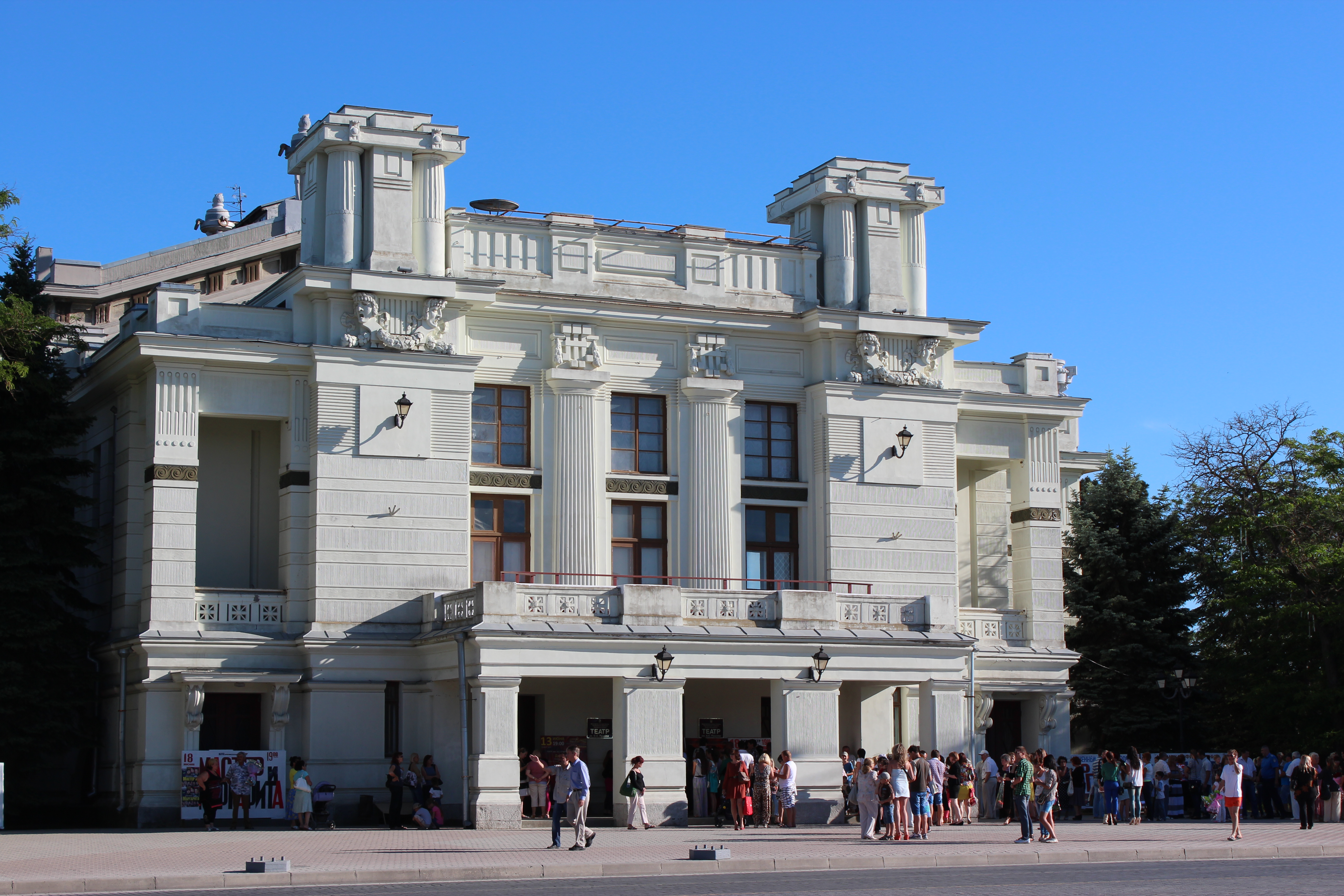
Theatre

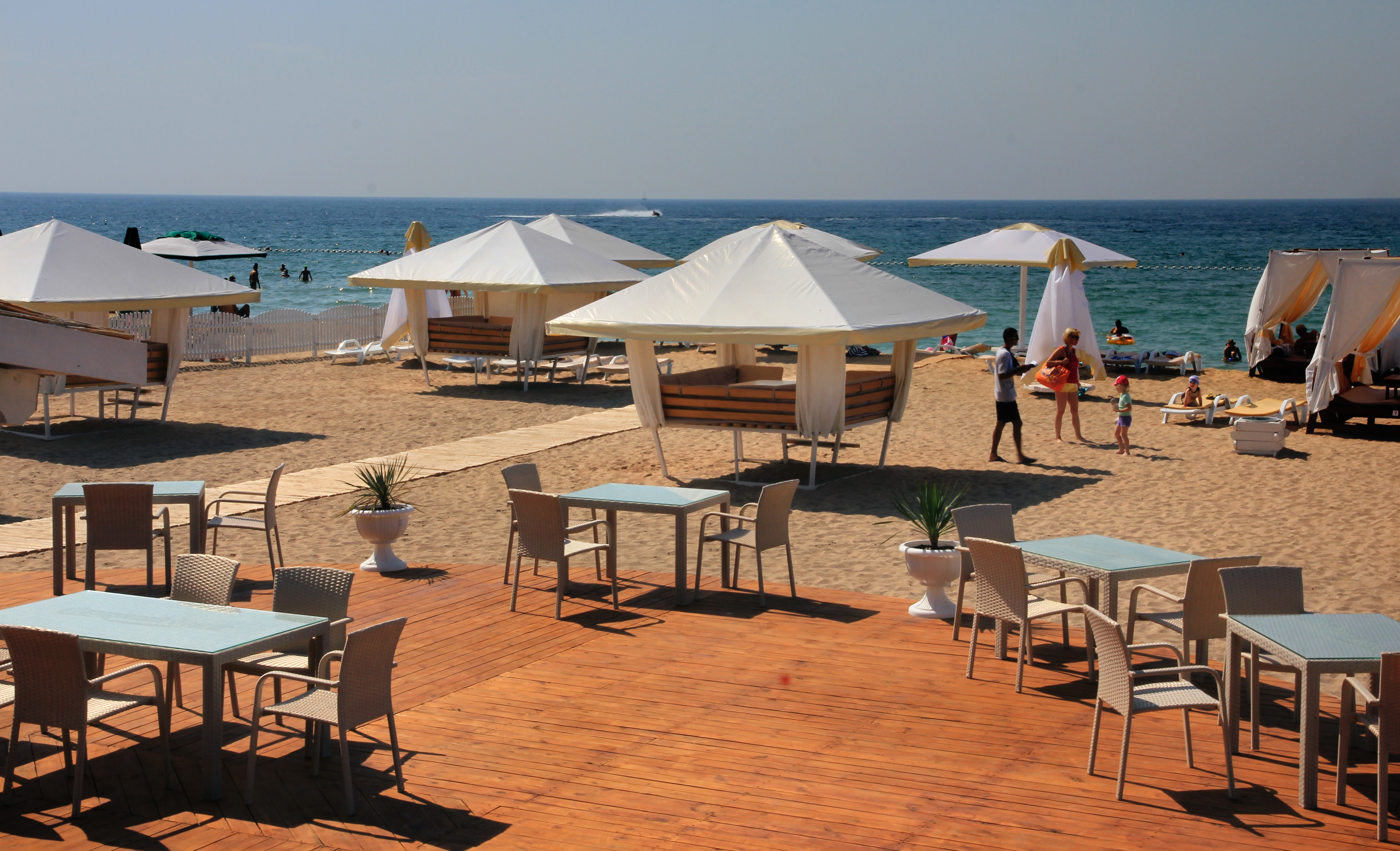
Vacation on the Black Sea coast in Yevpatoria

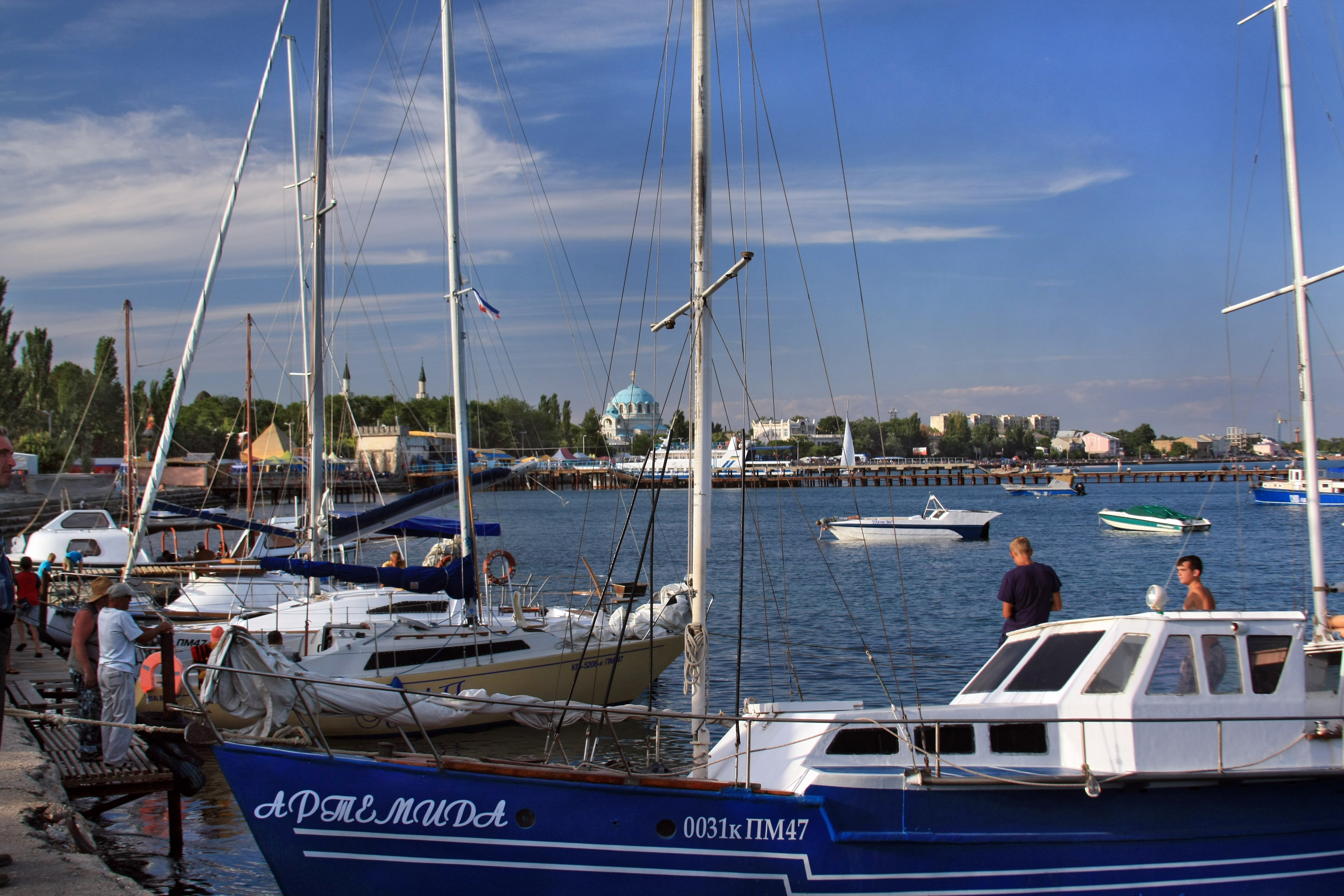
Port of Yevpatoria

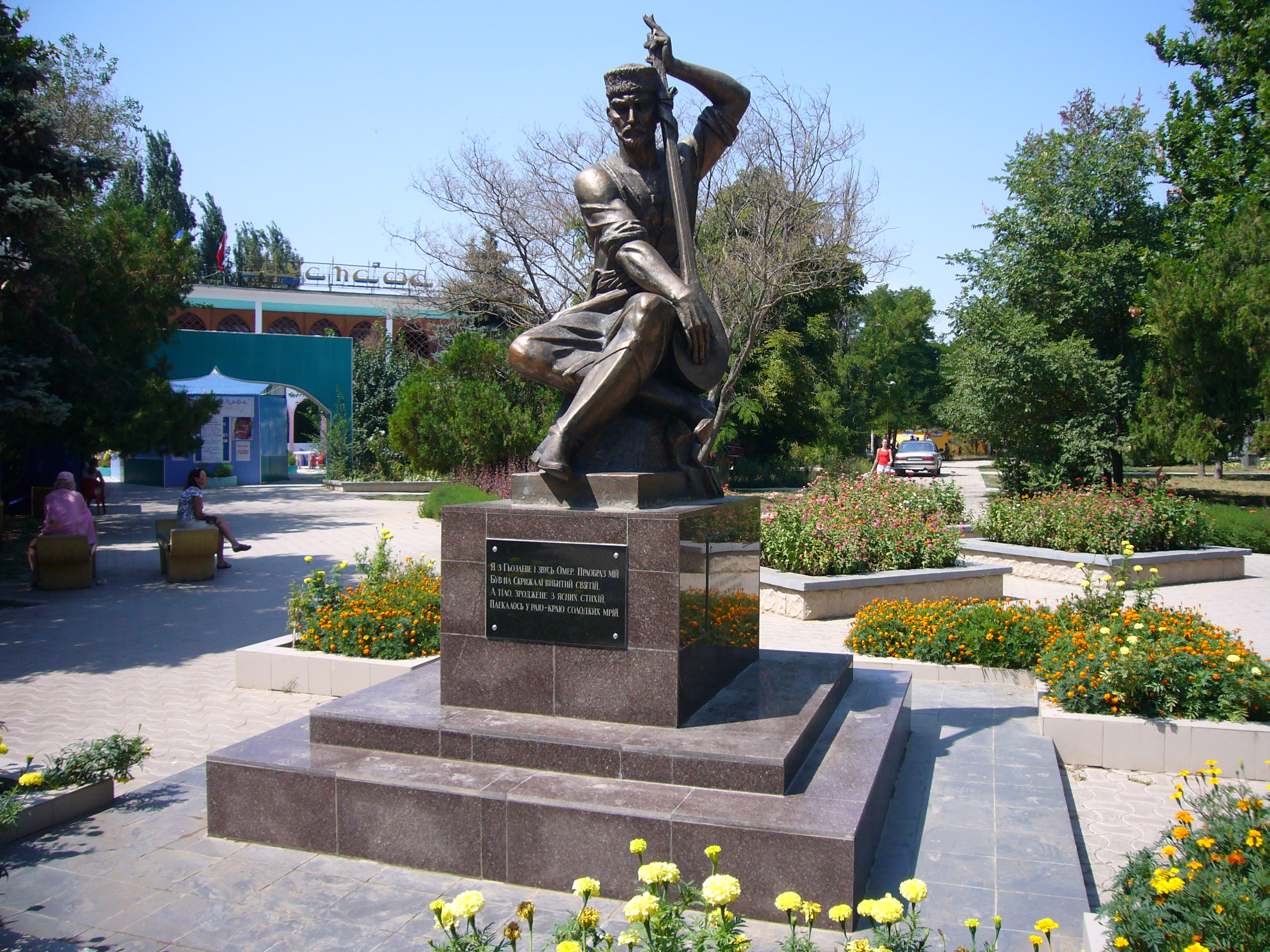
Monument to Crimean Tatar poet Omer Gezlevi

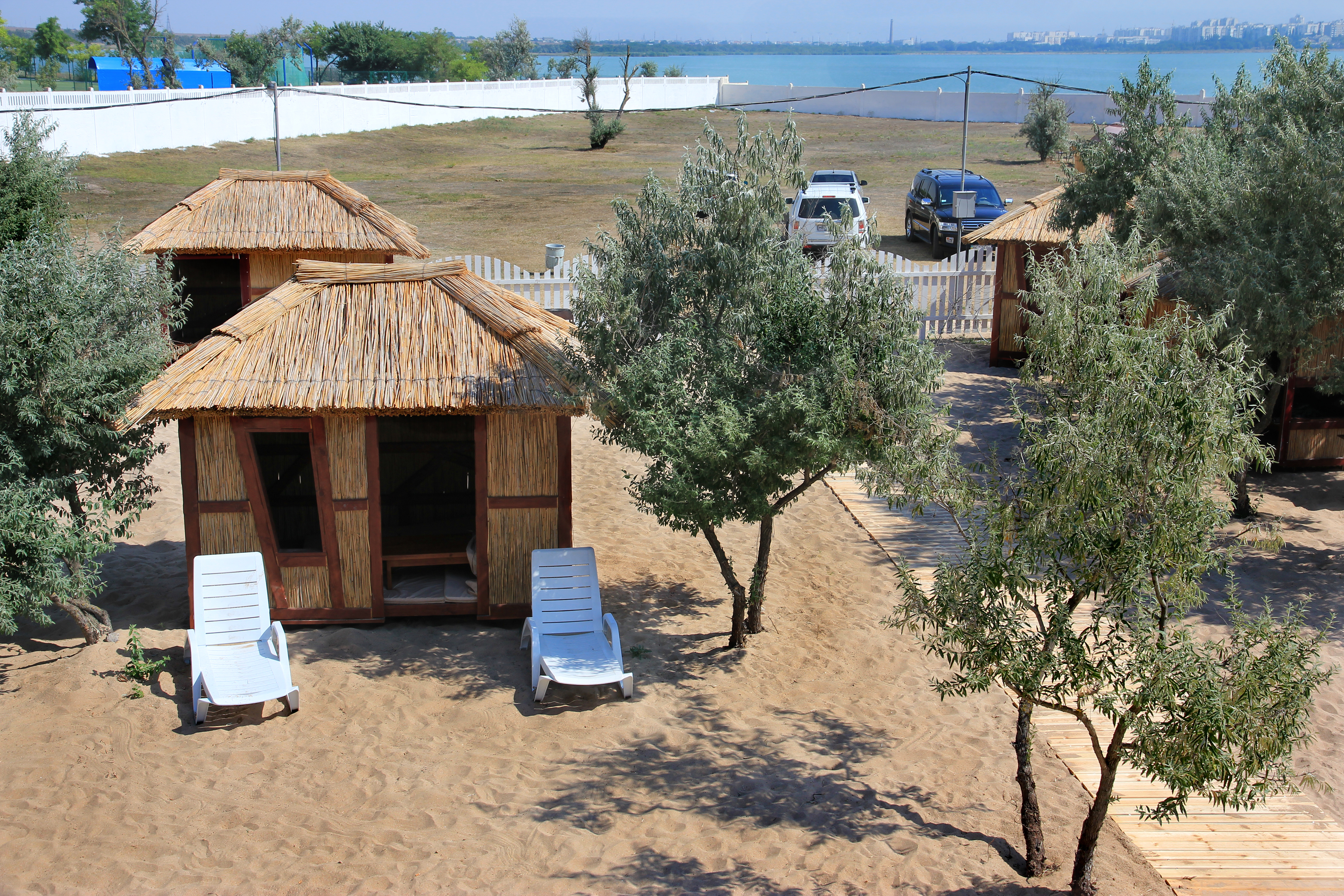
Holiday by Lake Moinaki

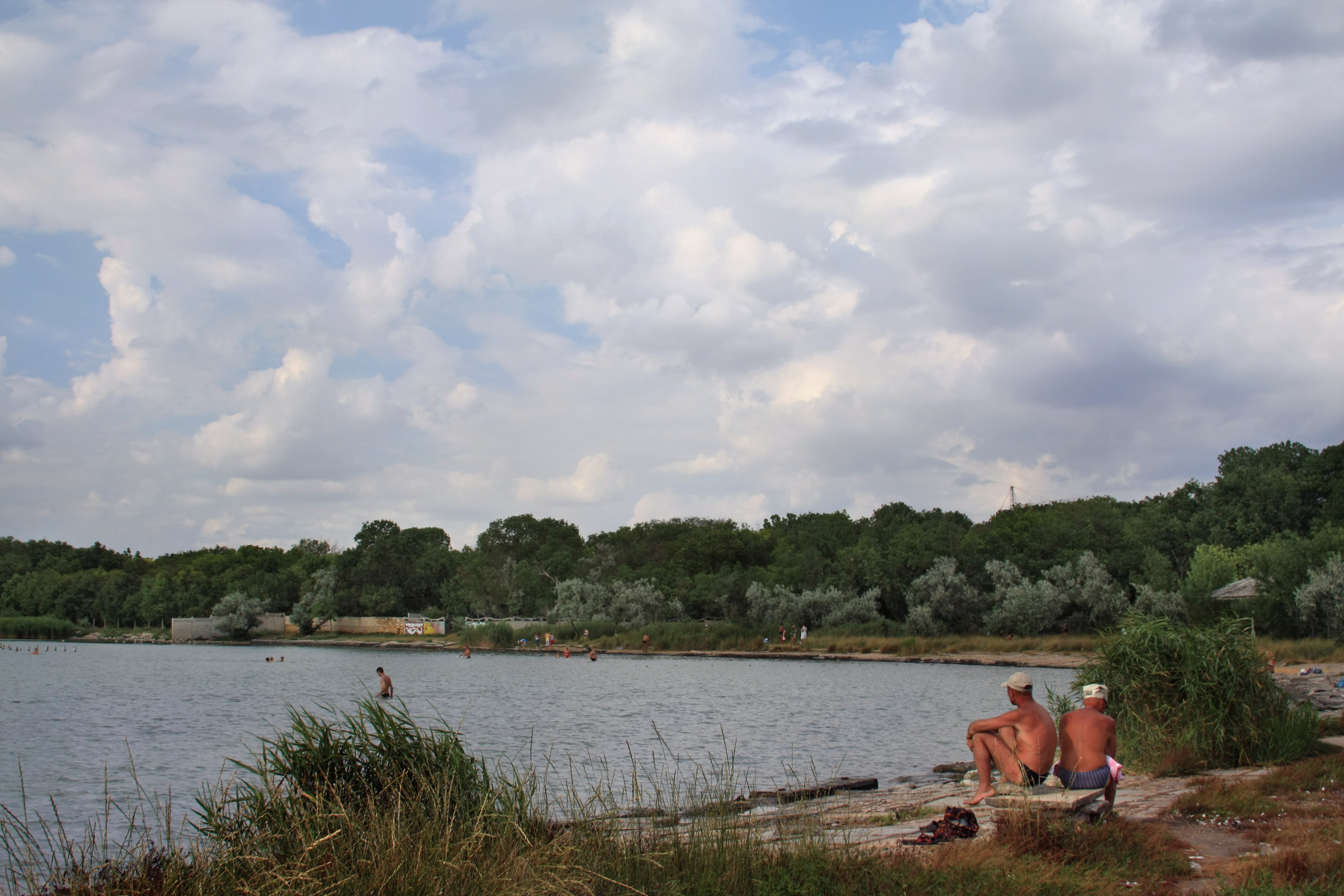
Healing Lake Moinaki

== See also ==
- Battle of Eupatoria
- Yevpatoria assault
- Yevpatoria Bay
