= Kalamita Bay =

Coordinates: 45°03′00″N 33°28′00″E

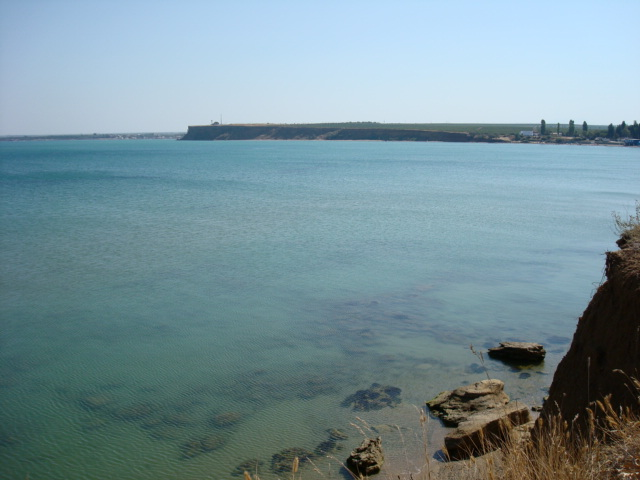

- Location within Crimea Location within Black Sea
- Interactive map of Kalamita Bay
- Location: Black Sea
- Ocean/sea sources: Atlantic Ocean
- Basin countries: Russia/Ukraine
- Max. length: 13 km (8.1 mi)
- Max. width: 41 km (25 mi)
- Average depth: 30 m (98 ft)
- Salinity: '

Kalamita Bay (Russian: Каламитский залив; Ukrainian: Каламітська затока; Crimean Tatar: Kalamita körfezi, Каламита корьфези), also known as Gulf of Kalamita, is a bay and a gulf in the Black Sea south of Yevpatoria, Crimea. Kalamita was likewise a name used for Inkerman.

For a 24 km arch east from Cape Karantinny approximately following a geological fault, Yevpatoria Bay forms an arm of Kalamita Bay with a change of current direction from the main bay.

== History ==
On 18 September 1854, French and British forces landed here in pursuit of their objective of besieging and destroying the Russian naval base of Sevastopol. The sighting of the allied fleet immediately caused local Tatars to form armed bands in support of the invaders, while local Russians and Greeks fled in panic. The landing took five days and was unopposed, though several Cossack scouts observed from a distance. The beach was well-protected, by the respective navies on the seaward side, and by a saltwater lagoon to landward. Wells were dug for water, which proved however to be extremely brackish. Soldiers either drank from puddles or took wine from nearby farms.
