= Eupatorian Kenassas =

Karaite synagogue in Crimea, Ukraine

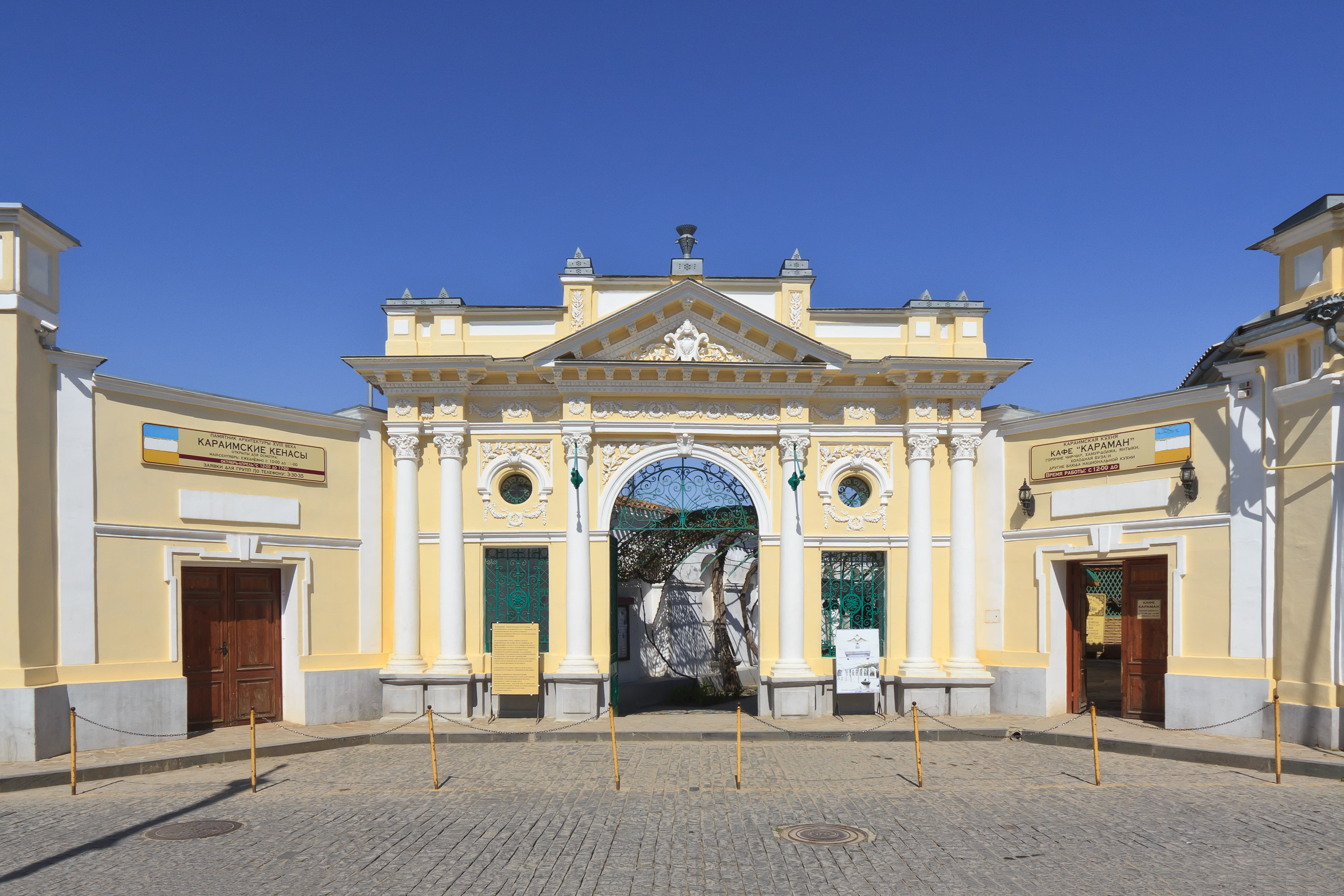
- Entrance to the Karaite Kenassa

- Location of the synagogue in Ukraine

Religion
- Affiliation: Judaism
- Rite: Karaite Judaism
- Ecclesiastical or organizational status: Synagogue
- Status: Active

Location
- Location: Karaimskaya Street, 68, Yevpatoria, Crimea
- Country: Ukraine
- Interactive map of Eupatorian Kenassas
- Coordinates: 45°11′55″N 33°22′27″E

Architecture
- Type: Karaite architecture
- Established: 1837 (as a congregation)
- Completed: 1837

Immovable Monument of National Significance of Ukraine
- Official name: Комплекс кенас (Complex of kenassas)
- Type: Architecture
- Reference no.: 010047

The Eupatorian Kenassas is a complex of Karaite Jewish synagogues located on Karaimskaya Street in Yevpatoria, Crimea, Ukraine. The synagogue complex is the oldest active Karaite synagogue in the world.

== Overview ==
The Crimean Karaites (karaev) complex covers 0.25 hectares (0.62 acres) and consists of large and small meeting spaces, religious schools (Midrash), charity dining, household courtyards, and multiple courtyards. The kenesa has been a centre of the religious life of the Karaites of Yevpatoria since 1837.

== Gallery ==
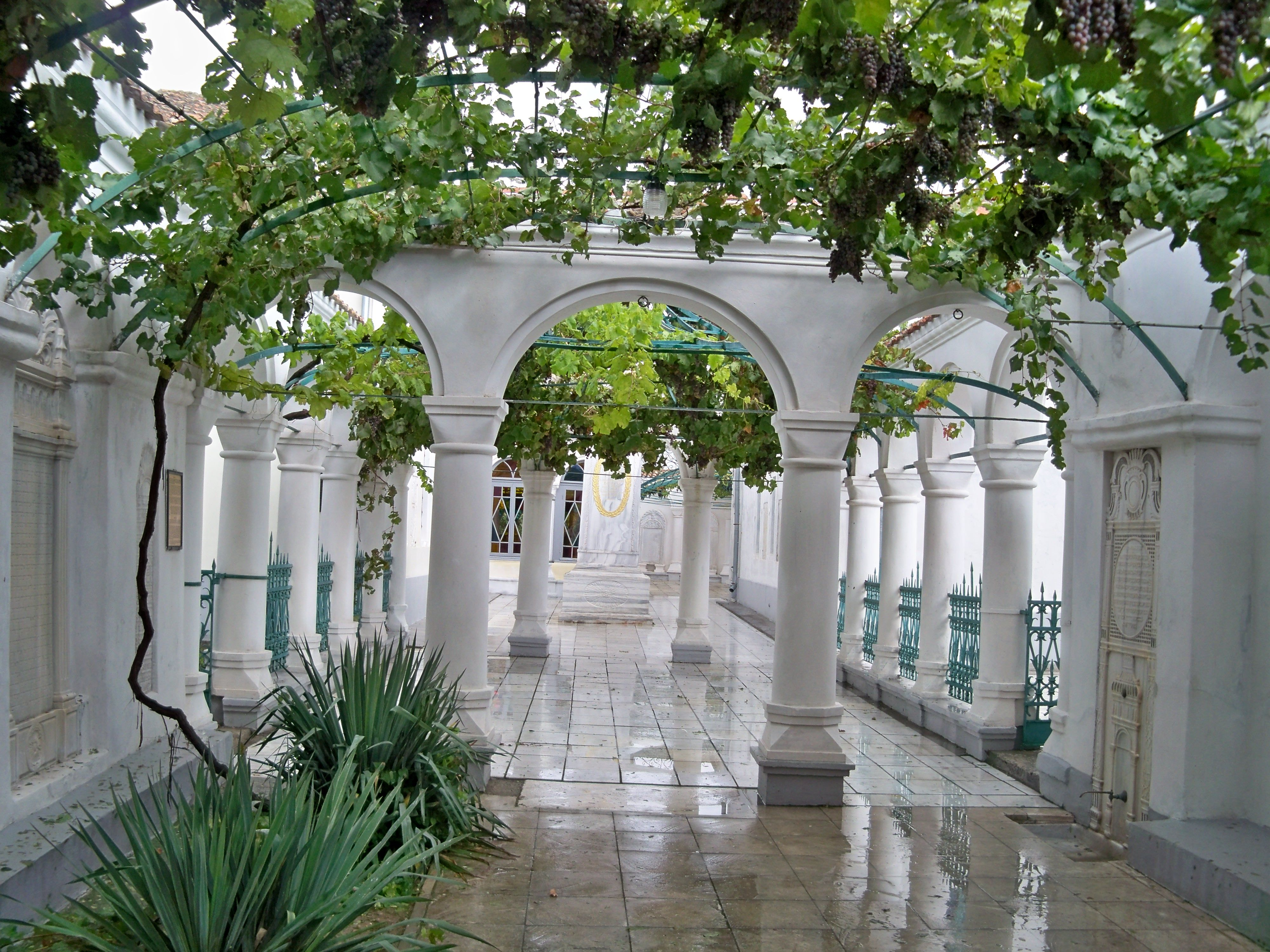
Courtyard, in 2021

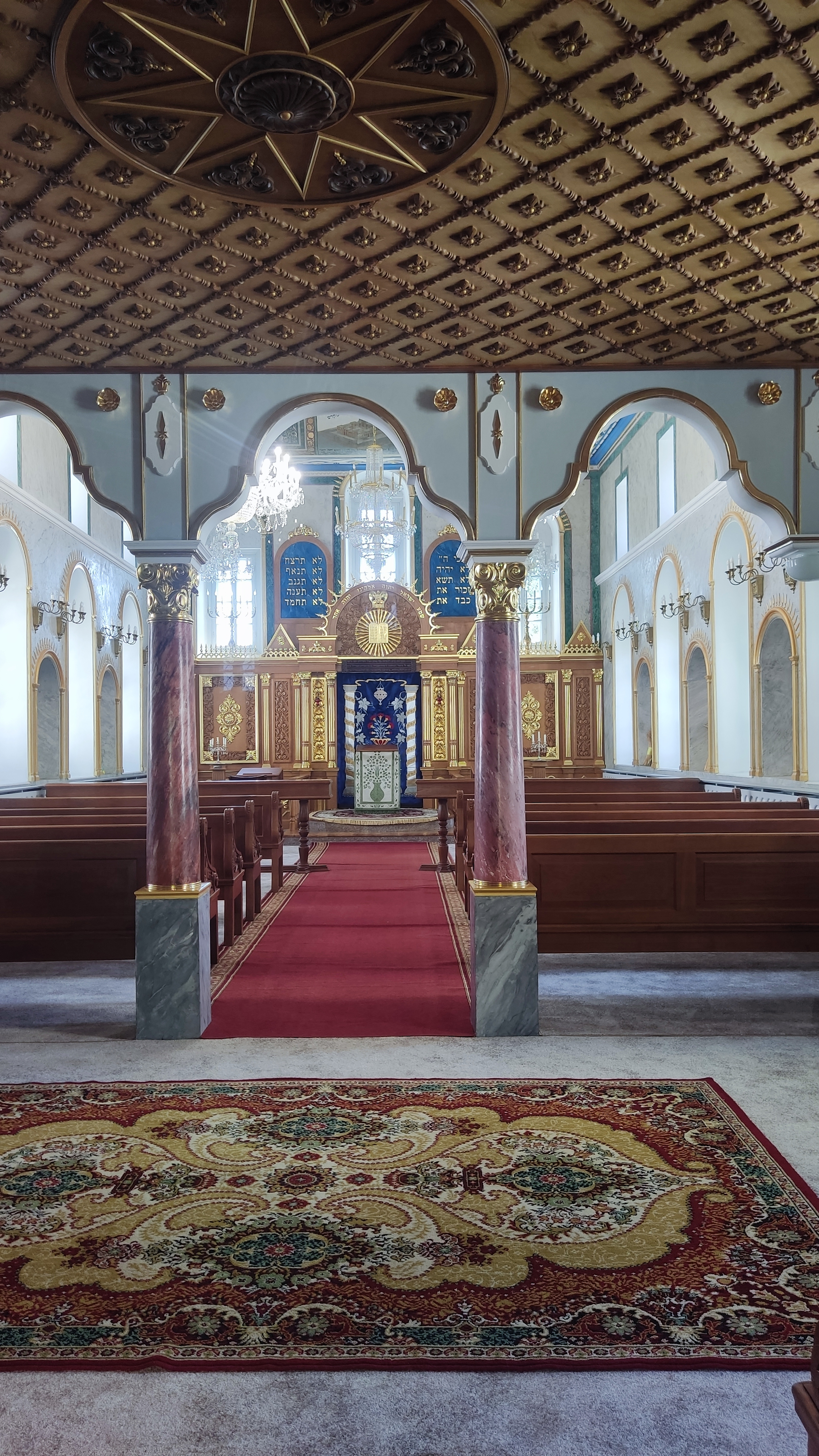
Interior, in 2013

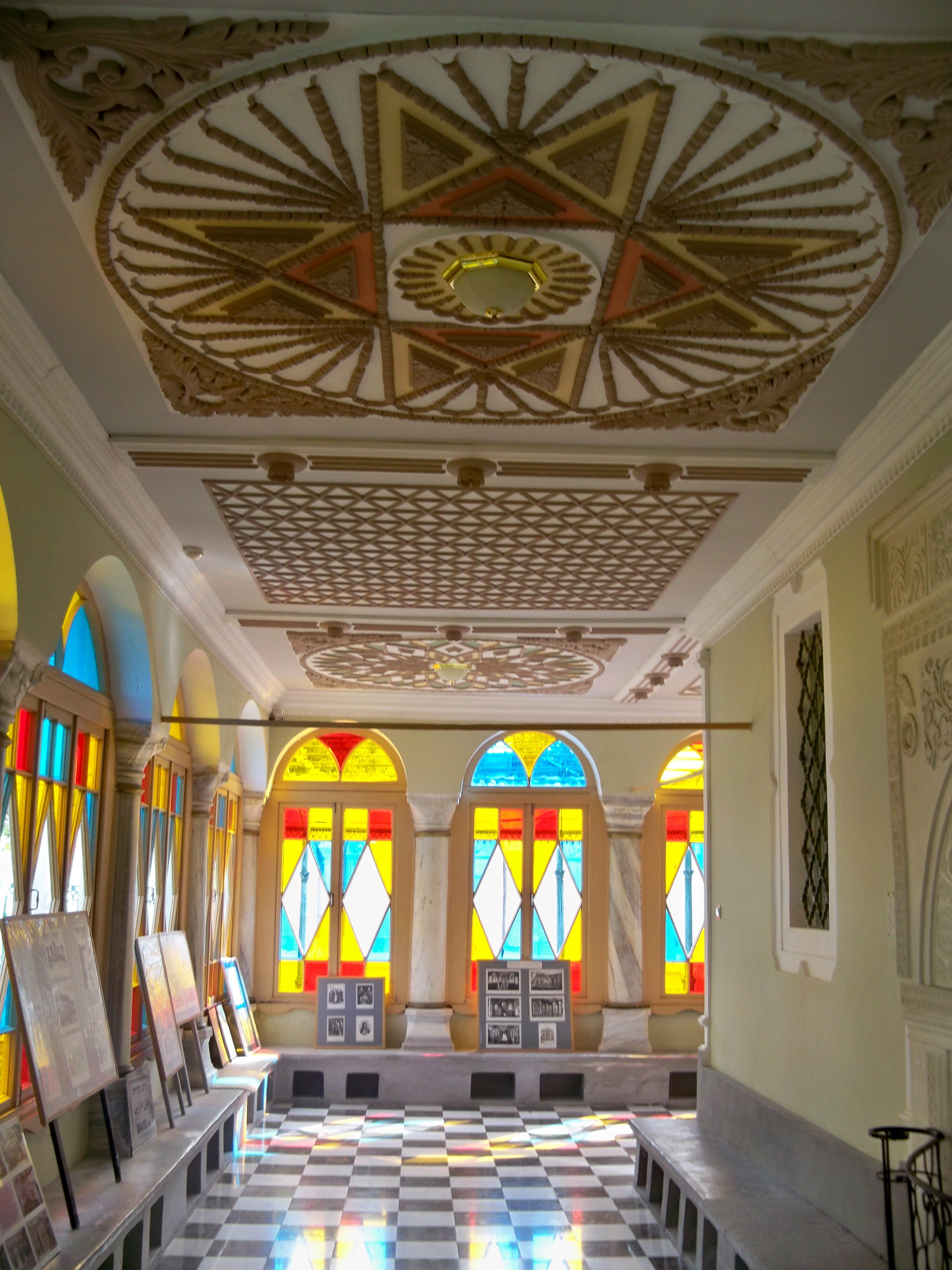
Interior and stained glass windows, in 2013

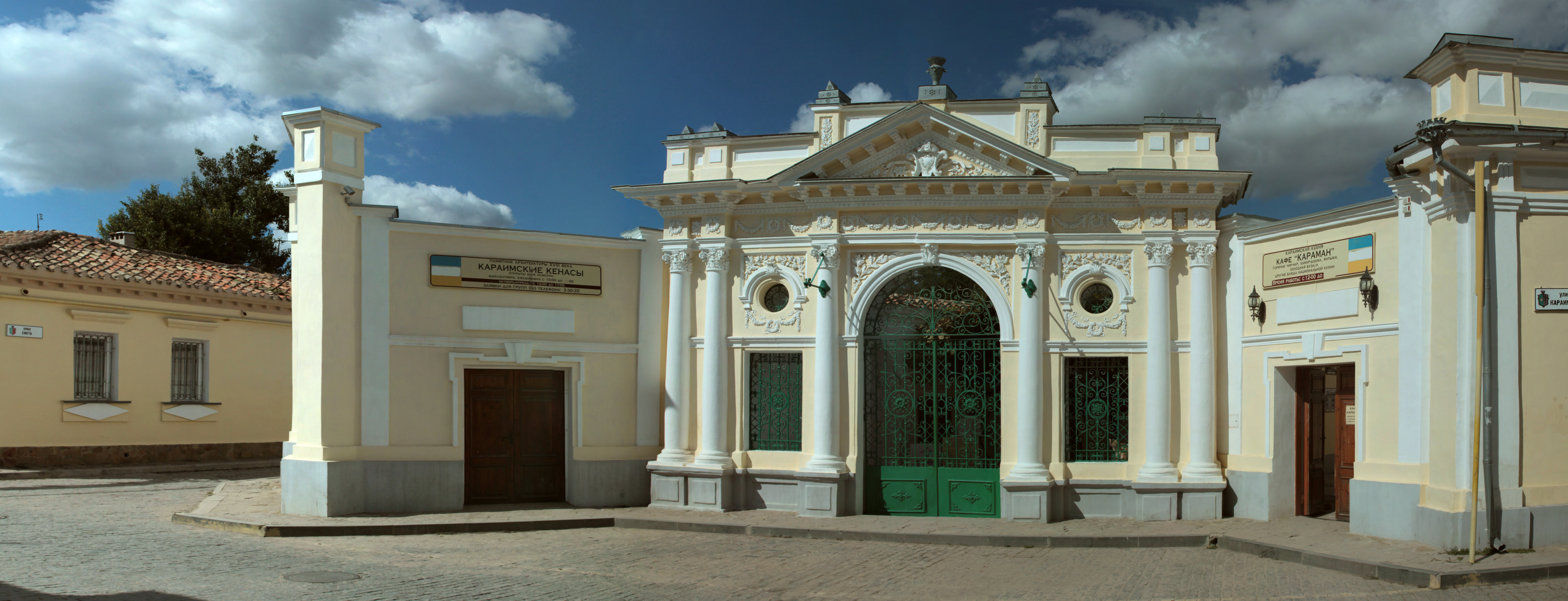
Exterior, in 2013

== See also ==
- History of the Jews in Ukraine
- List of Karaite synagogues
- List of synagogues in Ukraine
