= G11 =

G11 may refer to:

== Vehicles ==
- BMW 7 Series (G11), a German automobile
- Gribovsky G-11, a Soviet military glider of World War II
- HMS G11, a Royal Navy G-class submarine
- HMAS Quadrant (G11), a Royal Australian Navy Q-class destroyer
- Nissan Sylphy G11, a Japanese automobile

== Other uses ==
- Canon PowerShot G11, a digital camera
- G11 Hegang–Dalian Expressway, in China
- Group of Eleven, a intergovernmental forum
- Heckler & Koch G11, an experimental assault rifle
- Hereditary ataxia
- Hexachlorophene, an organic chemical
- Logitech G11, a computer keyboard
