= HMS Iphigenia (1891) =

Apollo-class cruiser

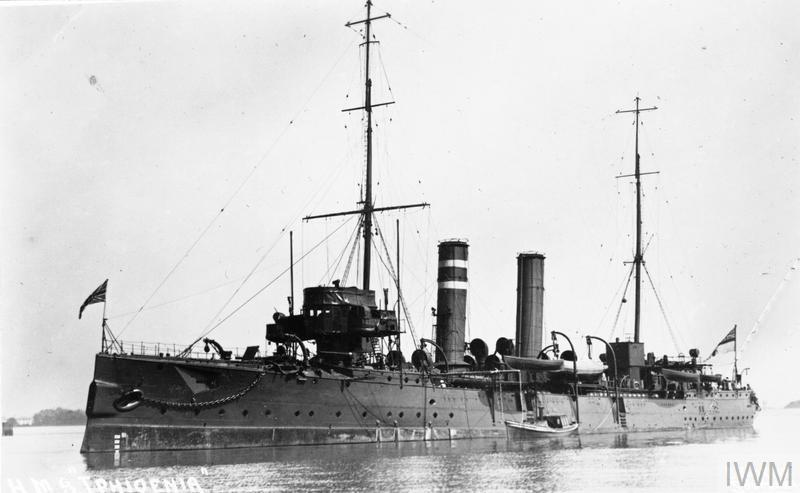
- Iphigenia, 1910s

History

United Kingdom
- Name: HMS Iphigenia
- Builder: London and Glasgow Shipbuilding Company
- Laid down: 17 March 1890
- Launched: 19 November 1891
- Commissioned: May 1893
- Fate: Expended as a block ship, 23 April 1918
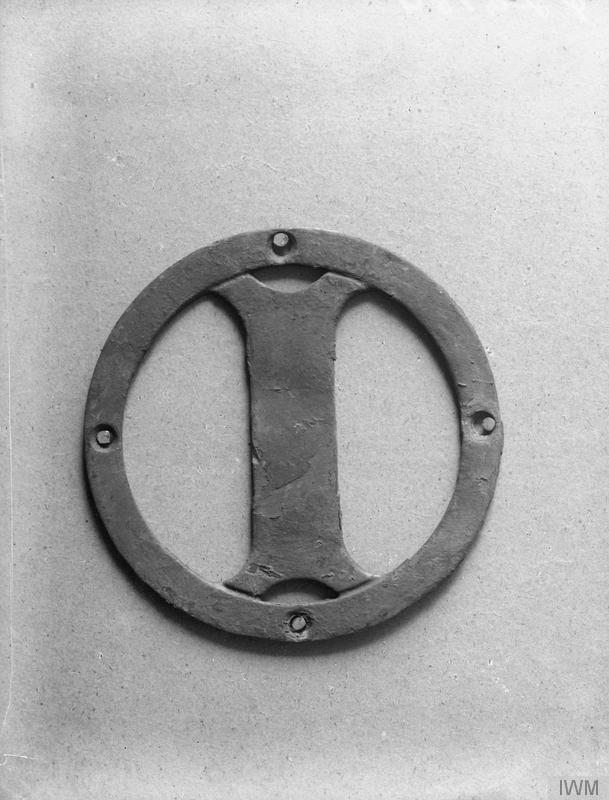
- Badge: Ship's badge of HMS Iphigenia (IWM Q20184)

General characteristics
- Class & type: Apollo-class cruiser
- Displacement: 3,600 tons
- Length: 314 ft (95.7 m)
- Beam: 43.5 ft (13.3 m)
- Draught: 17.5 ft (5.3 m)
- Propulsion: twin screw triple expansion engines; from Earle's Shipbuilding
- Speed: 19.75 knots (36.58 km/h)
- Complement: 273 to 300 (Officers and Men)
- Armament: As built: 2 × QF 6-inch (152.4 mm) guns; 6 × QF 4.7-inch (120 mm) guns; 8 × 6-pounders; 2 to 4 × 14 inch torpedo tubes; Converted pre-1914 to a lightly armed minelayer.

HMS Iphigenia was an Apollo-class protected cruiser of the Royal Navy built on the River Clyde and launched in 1891, spending her early years on the China Station. When she became obsolete as a cruiser, she was converted as a minelayer in 1907. Her service ended when she was sunk as a blockship during the Zeebrugge Raid on 23 April 1918.

== History ==
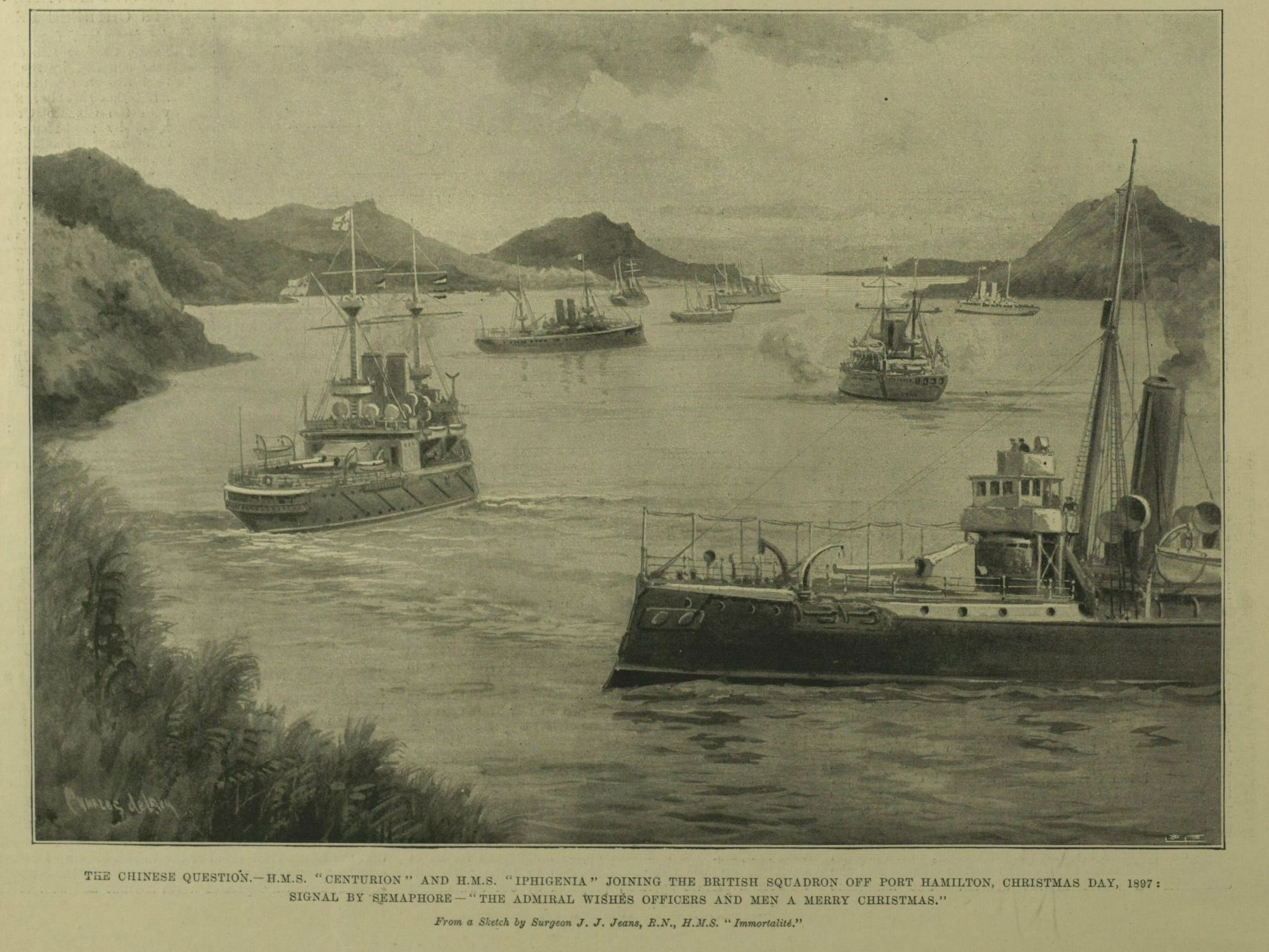
The Chinese Question, HMS Centurion and Iphigenia joining the British Squadron off Port Hamilton, Christmas Day, 1897

Ordered under the Naval Defence Act 1889, Iphigenia was laid down in 1891 at the yard of the London and Glasgow Shipbuilding Company. Under the command of Captain Horation Nelson Dudding, she left Singapore for England in April 1900. She was ordered with HMS Sutlej to monitor the Russian fleeting sailing through the Singapore Strait on the way to the Battle of Tsushima. They arrived too late to this although they did meet the Russian fleet the following day with Sutlej greeting them with a 17 gun salute. She returned from duty on the China Station in 1906.

Along with a number of other ships of her class, as she became obsolete as a cruiser she was converted at Chatham Dockyard into a minelayer. This work was completed by August 1907. She was then based at Dover and Sheerness. In 1917 she was in use as a depot ship in the White Sea as part of the British North Russia Squadron.

Along with HMS Intrepid and HMS Thetis she was selected to be used as a blockship during the Zeebrugge Raid. She was sunk at the entrance to the Bruges Canal to try to prevent its use by German U-boats. She was subsequently broken up when the canal was cleared.

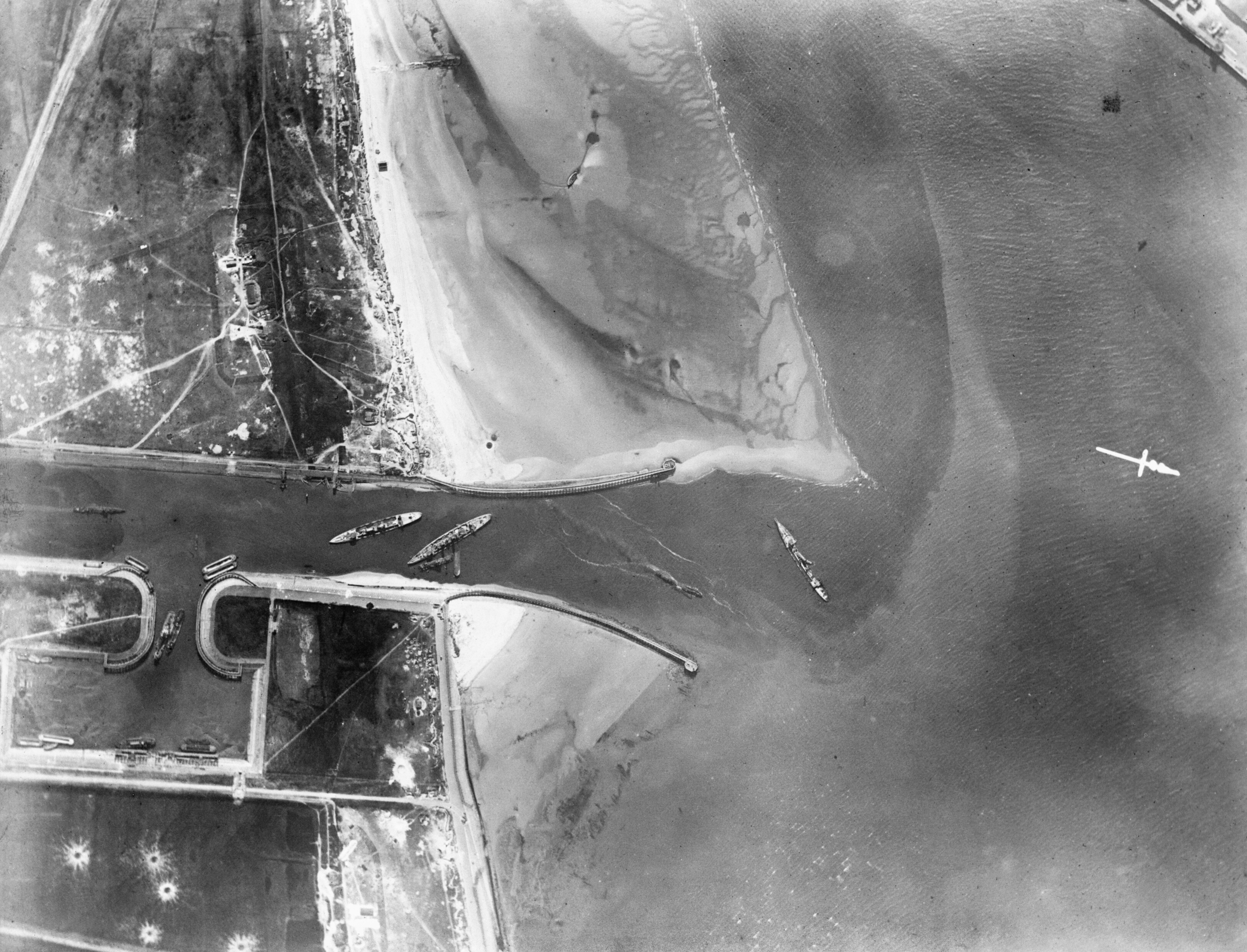
Aerial photograph showing the blockships sunk after the Zeebrugge Raid. HMS Iphigenia is second from left

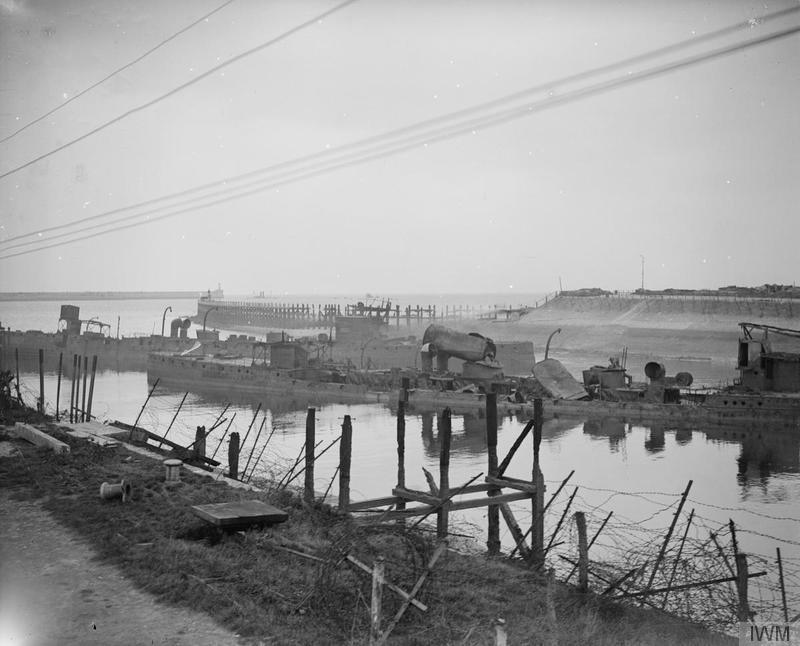
Wrecks of Iphigenia and HMS Intrepid blocking the mouth of the Bruges Ship Canal at Zeebrugge, 24 October 1918.

== Publications ==
- Colledge, J. J.; Warlow, Ben (2006) [1969]. Ships of the Royal Navy: The Complete Record of All Fighting Ships of the Royal Navy from the 15th Century to the Present (3rd Rev ed.). London: Chatham Publishing. ISBN 978-1-86176-281-8. OCLC 67375475.
- Gardiner, Robert; Gray, Randal, eds. (1985). Conway's All The World's Fighting Ships 1906–1921. London: Conway Maritime Press. ISBN 0-85177-245-5.
