= HMS Intrepid (1891) =

Apollo-class protected cruiser of the Royal Navy

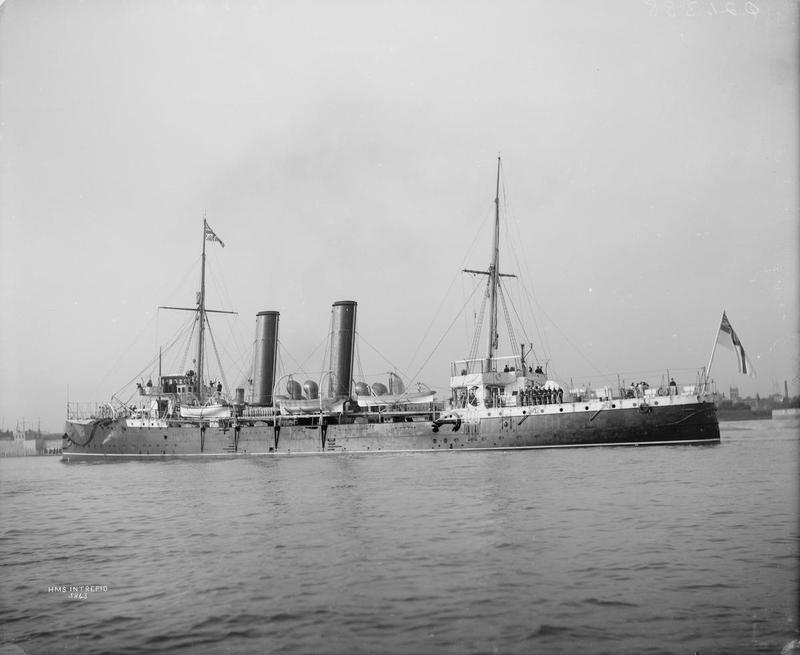
- HMS Intrepid in her original configuration, 1896 (IWM Q21388)

History

United Kingdom
- Name: HMS Intrepid
- Builder: London and Glasgow Shipbuilding Company
- Laid down: 6 September 1889
- Launched: 20 June 1891
- Commissioned: November 1892
- Honours and awards: ZEEBRUGGE 1918
- Fate: Expended as a block ship, 23 April 1918
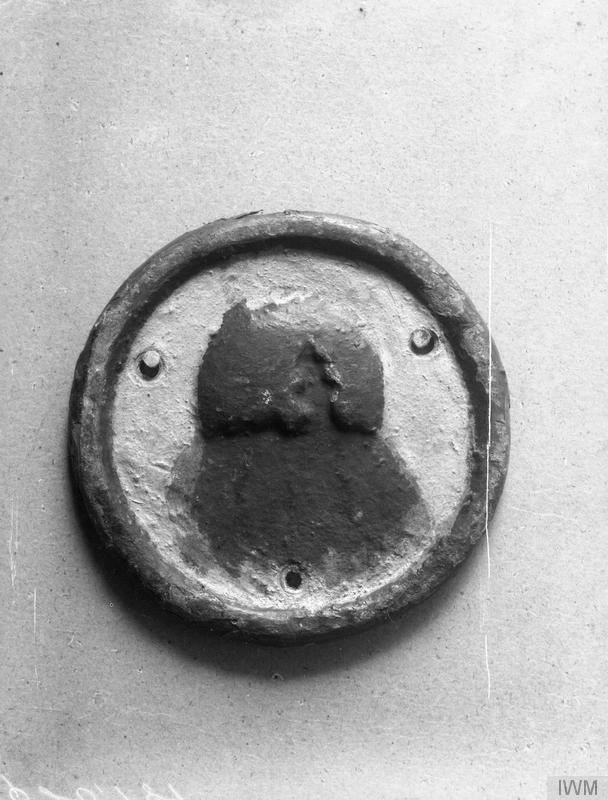
- Badge: Ship's badge of HMS Intrepid (IWM Q20181)

General characteristics
- Class & type: Apollo-class cruiser
- Displacement: 3,600 tons
- Length: 314 ft (95.7 m)
- Beam: 43.5 ft (13.3 m)
- Draught: 17.5 ft (5.3 m)
- Propulsion: twin screw triple expansion engines; from Earle's Shipbuilding
- Speed: 19.75 knots (36.58 km/h)
- Complement: 273 to 300 (Officers and Men)
- Armament: As built: 2 × QF 6-inch (152.4 mm) guns; 6 × QF 4.7-inch (120 mm) guns; 8 × 6-pounders; 2 to 4 × 14 inch torpedo tubes; Converted pre-1914 to a lightly armed minelayer.

HMS Intrepid was an Apollo-class protected cruiser of the Royal Navy built on the River Clyde and launched in 1891. She was subsequently converted as a minelayer in the latter half of her career and ultimately sunk as a blockship during the Zeebrugge Raid on 23 April 1918.

== History ==
Ordered under the Naval Defence Act 1889, Intrepid was laid down in 1889 at the yard of the London and Glasgow Shipbuilding Company. Following completion in November 1892 Intrepid was held at Portsmouth. During 1896–99 she served on the North America & West Indian Station, then in 1899 returned to Portsmouth. After a refit, she returned to service in early April 1900, when she was placed in the Fleet Reserve at Portsmouth.

In 1902 she was commissioned at Portsmouth for service on the Mediterranean station. She left that city on 14 October, visiting Plymouth and Gibraltar en route before arriving at the station headquarters at Malta later the same month. Between October 1902 and 1904 she served in the Mediterranean, visiting various ports and taking part in manoeuvres. In late 1902 she was at Port Said, where members of her crew provided the naval guard for the Duke and Duchess of Connaught as they visited the city in December, en route for India. In February 1903 she was at Aden. From 1904 she saw harbour service at Portsmouth until 1909.

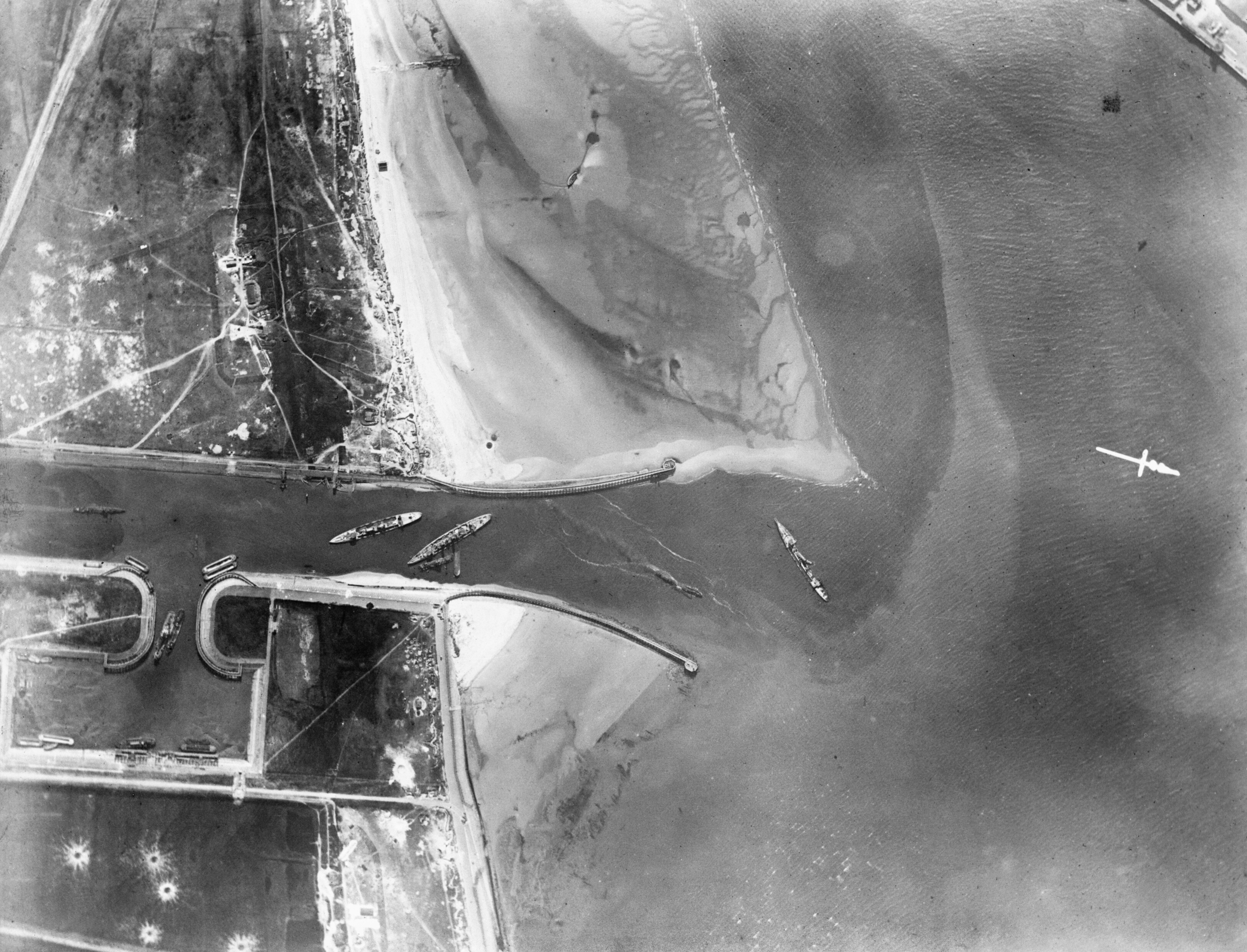
Aerial photograph showing the blockships sunk after the Zeebrugge Raid. HMS Intrepid is on the far left.

Along with a number of other ships of her class, as she became obsolete as a cruiser she was converted at Chatham Dockyard into a minelayer, carrying 100 mines and with armament reduced to four 4.7-inch guns. In 1910 she recommissioned at Chatham. On the outbreak of the First World War Intrepid was based at Dover, undertaking minelaying duties as part of the Dover Patrol.

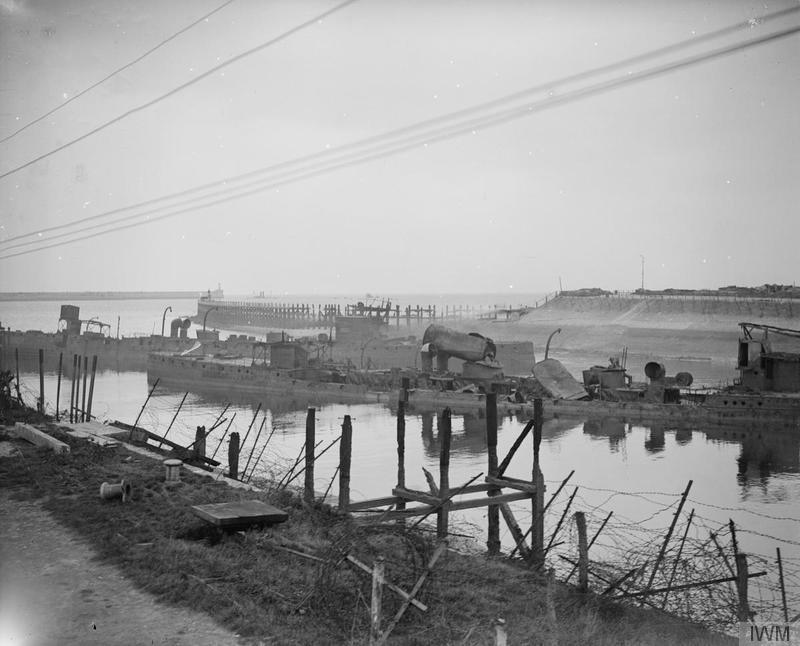
Wrecks of HMS Iphigenia and Intrepid blocking the mouth of the Bruges Ship Canal at Zeebrugge, 24 October 1918

In 1915–16 she became a depot ship, North Russia. In 1917 she was in use as a depot ship in the White Sea as part of the British North Russia Squadron. Along with HMS Iphigenia and HMS Thetis, she was selected to be used as a blockship during the Zeebrugge Raid. She was prepared for the raid by being filled with cement. She was sunk at the entrance to the Bruges Canal to try to prevent its use by German U-boats. She was subsequently broken up when the canal was cleared.

== Publications ==
- Bacon, Reginald (1919). The Dover Patrol 1915-1917. (2 vols.). New York: George H. Doran Co. Vol. 1 • Vol. 2
- Colledge, J. J.; Warlow, Ben (2006) [1969]. Ships of the Royal Navy: The Complete Record of All Fighting Ships of the Royal Navy from the 15th Century to the Present (3rd Rev ed.). London: Chatham Publishing. ISBN 978-1-86176-281-8. OCLC 67375475.
- Gardiner, Robert; Gray, Randal, eds. (1985). Conway's All The World's Fighting Ships 1906–1921. London: Conway Maritime Press. ISBN 0-85177-245-5.
