= HMS North Star (1916) =

HMS North Star was a Royal Navy Admiralty M-class destroyer constructed and then operational in the First World War. She was sunk in April 1918.

The destroyer was launched on 9 November 1916 and completed in February 1917.

== Design and construction ==
The M-class destroyers were designed to meet a requirement for faster destroyers than the previous Laforey-class, in order to match reported German ships. They hoped for a speed of 36 knots (41 mph; 67 km/h), but otherwise, the requirements were similar to those that gave rise to the Laforeys. As part of its 1913–1914 shipbuilding programme, the Admiralty ordered six ships to the standard Admiralty design, together with seven builder's specials from the experienced destroyer builders Yarrow, Thornycroft and Hawthorn Leslie, to the builder's own designs. The outbreak of the First World War resulted in a series of large orders being placed for destroyers to replace expected losses, with the existing M-class being chosen for orders rather than new designs to speed production. North Star was one of four Admiralty Ms (Note: Norman, Northesk. North Star and Nugent.) ordered from Palmers Shipbuilding and Iron Company as part of an overall order of 22 destroyers of this class under the Third Emergency War Programme in late November 1914.

War-built Admiralty M-class destroyers like North Star were between 273 ft 4 in (83.31 m) and 273 ft 8 in (83.41 m) long overall, with a beam of 26 ft 8 in (8.13 m) to 26 ft 10 in (8.18 m) and a draught of 8 ft 6 in (2.59 m) at normal load and 9 ft 5 in (2.87 m) to 9 ft 7 in (2.92 m). They had a design normal displacement of 1,025 long tons (1,041 t) which corresponded to a full load displacement of about 1,250 long tons (1,270 t).

== Sinking ==
The destroyer took part in the Zeebrugge raid in April 1918 and was assigned as an escort ship, along with HMS Phoebe to guard HMS Vindictive. She was subsequently sunk on 23 April 1918 by German shore batteries 1 nmi (1.2 mi; 1.9 km) off Zeebrugge harbour, during the raid. According to the official British Admiralty Statement on the Zeebrugge Raid, North Star lost her way in the smoke of the raid and emerged into the light of star-shells, whereupon she was sunk by coastal batteries.

== Bibliography ==
- Colledge, J. J.; Warlow, Ben (2006) [1969]. Ships of the Royal Navy: The Complete Record of All Fighting Ships of the Royal Navy from the 15th Century to the Present (3rd Rev ed.). London: Chatham Publishing. ISBN 978-1-86176-281-8. OCLC 67375475.
- Friedman, Norman (2009). British Destroyers: From Earliest Days to the Second World War. Barnsley, UK: Seaforth Publishing. ISBN 978-1-84832-049-9.
- Gardiner, Robert & Gray, Randal, eds. (1985). Conway's All The World's Fighting Ships 1906–1921. London: Conway Maritime Press. ISBN 0-85177-245-5.
- March, Edgar J. (1966). British Destroyers: A History of Development, 1892–1953; Drawn by Admiralty Permission From Official Records & Returns, Ships' Covers & Building Plans. London: Seeley Service. OCLC 164893555.
- McBride, Keith (1991). "British 'M' Class Destroyers of 1913–14". In Gardiner, Robert (ed.). Warship 1991. London: Conway Maritime Press. pp. 34–49. ISBN 0-85177-582-9.
