= Norman Finch =

Norman Augustus Finch
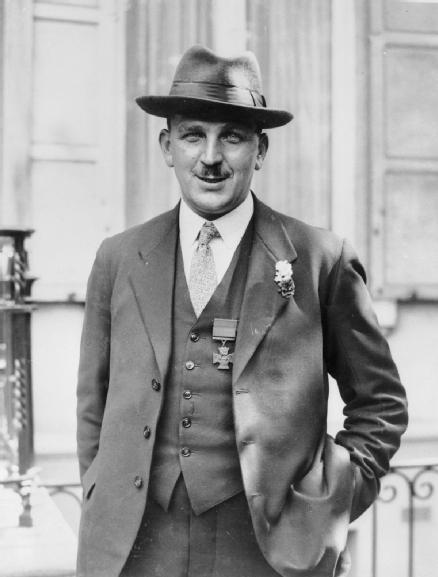
- Born: 26 December 1890; Birmingham, England
- Died: 15 March 1966 (aged 75); Portsmouth, England
- Burial place: Portchester Crematorium
- Military career
- Allegiance: United Kingdom
- Branch: Royal Marines
- Service years: 1908–1929; 1938–1945
- Rank: Lieutenant
- Units: Royal Marine Artillery
- Conflicts: First World War; Second World War
- Awards: Victoria Cross; Royal Victorian Medal; Meritorious Service Medal; Mentioned in Despatches
- Other work: Yeoman of the Guard

Norman Augustus Finch, VC (26 December 1890 – 15 March 1966) was a Royal Marines soldier and a recipient of the Victoria Cross, the highest award for gallantry in the face of the enemy that can be awarded to British and Commonwealth forces.

== Early life and career ==
Finch was born 26 December 1890 in Birmingham. He enlisted in the Royal Marines in January 1908 and received basic training at Eastney. For the next four years he served on various ships and shore stations and, in June 1913, was promoted to bombardier. This was soon followed by further rises to corporal in 1915 and sergeant in 1917. He joined the 4th Battalion on 23 March 1918.

== Victoria Cross ==
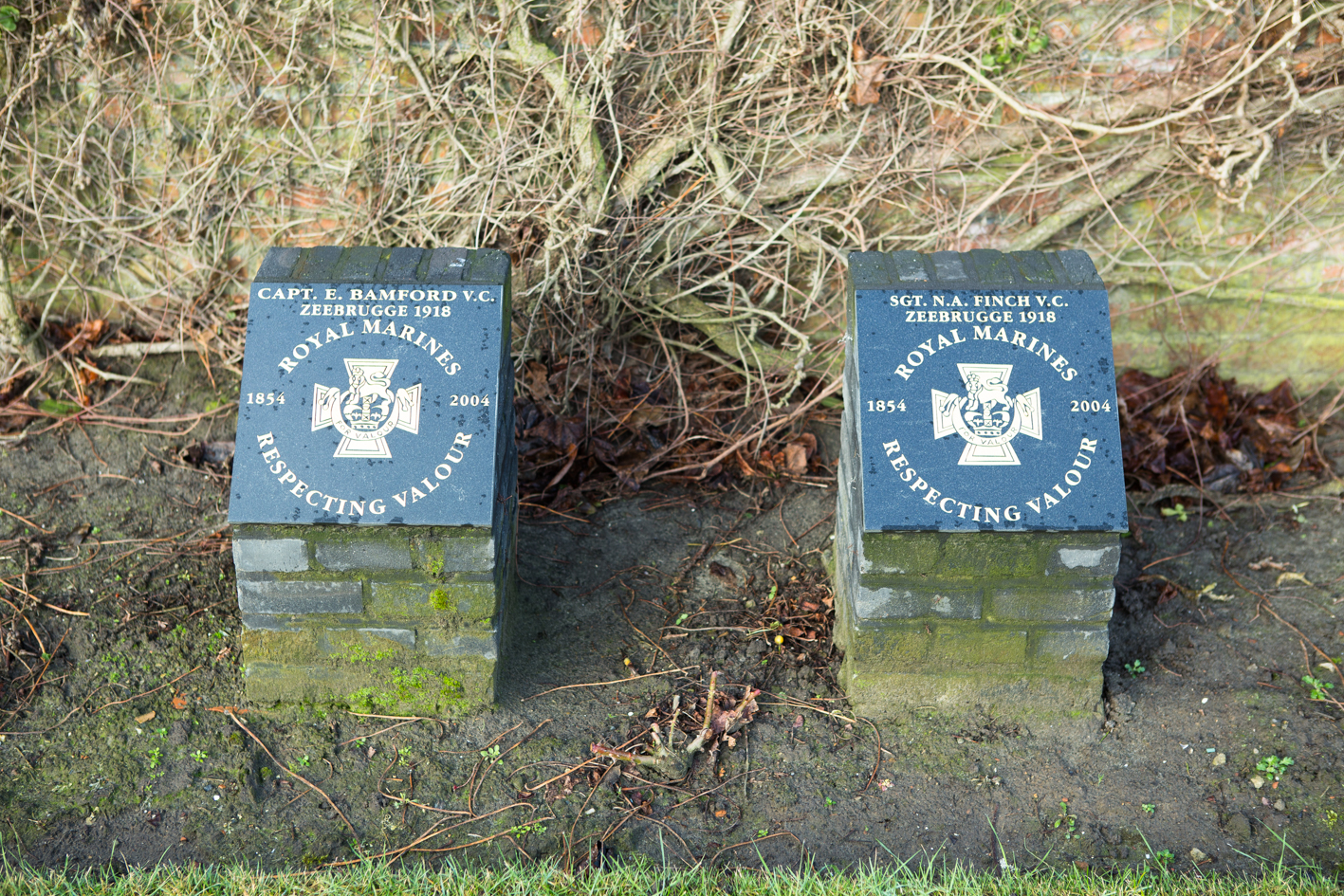
Memorial to Finch and Edward Bamford in Zeebrugge Churchyard

Finch was 27 years old, and a sergeant in the Royal Marine Artillery, Royal Marines during the First World War when the following deed took place for which he was awarded the Victoria Cross (VC).

On 22/23 April 1918 at Zeebrugge, Belgium, Sergeant Finch was second in command of the pom-poms and Lewis gun in the foretop of HMS Vindictive. At one period Vindictive was being hit every few seconds, but Sergeant Finch and the officer in command kept up a continuous fire, until two heavy shells made direct hits on the foretop killing or disabling everyone except Sergeant Finch who was, however, severely wounded. Nevertheless, he remained in his battered and exposed position, harassing the enemy on the Mole until the foretop received another direct hit, putting the remainder of the armament completely out of action. His award was by virtue of ballot.

== Later career and life ==
Finch retired with the rank of quartermaster sergeant in December 1929, though returned to the Portsmouth Division in 1938. He appears to have spent most of the Second World War as quarter master, serving as a storekeeper officer (lieutenant) at 104 (Training) RM Brigade, R.M. Training Group Dalditch, then Devon. On 15 August 1945 he was released from service and in 1964 was made divisional sergeant major of HM Bodyguard of the Yeoman of the Guard. He died 15 March 1966.

His Victoria Cross is displayed at the Royal Marines Museum in Southsea.

Finch was a Freemason and was initiated into Lodge of Hope No. 2153 at Portsmouth on 18 September 1918. He was subsequently a founding member of Royal Marine Portsmouth Lodge No. 6423 when it was consecrated on 23 April 1947, and was their first Senior Warden. The following year he was installed as their second Worshipful Master – on the thirtieth anniversary of the Zeebrugge Raid.
