= Zeebrugge Raid =

1918 Royal Navy blockade of the Belgian port of Zeebrugge during WWI

- Part of the First World War
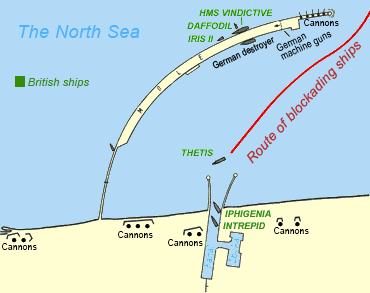
- Diagram of Zeebrugge harbour after the raid
Date	23 April 1918
Location	Port of Zeebrugge, Belgium 51°21′27″N 03°11′51″E
Result	German victory

Belligerents
United Kingdom	Germany

Commanders and leaders
John Jellicoe; Roger Keyes; Reginald Bacon	Ludwig von Schröder

Strength
1,700 Royal Marines; 1 destroyer	

Casualties and losses
227 killed; 356 wounded; 1 destroyer sunk	8 killed; 16 wounded

The Zeebrugge Raid (Dutch: Aanval op de haven van Zeebrugge; French: Raid sur Zeebruges) on 23 April 1918, was an attempt by the Royal Navy to block the Belgian port of Bruges-Zeebrugge. The British intended to sink obsolete ships in the canal entrance, to prevent German vessels from leaving port. The port was used by the Imperial German Navy as a base for the Flanders U-boat flotillas and light shipping, which were a threat to Allied control of the English Channel and southern North Sea. Several attempts to close the Flanders ports by bombardment failed and Operation Hush, a 1917 plan to advance up the coast, proved abortive. As ship losses to U-boats increased, finding a way to close the ports became urgent and the Admiralty became more willing to consider a raid.

An attempt to raid Zeebrugge was made on 2 April 1918 but was cancelled at the last moment, after the wind direction changed and made it impossible to lay a smokescreen to cover the ships. Another attempt was made on 23 April, with a concurrent attack on Ostend. Two of three blockships were scuttled in the narrowest part of the Bruges–Ostend Canal and one of two submarines rammed the viaduct linking the shore and the mole, to trap the German garrison. The blockships were sunk in the wrong place and after a few days the Germans had opened the canal to submarines at high tide. Lessons were learned during the operation that would be put to use in the Second World War.

== Background ==
=== Strategic developments ===
At the end of 1916 a combined operation against Borkum, Ostend and Zeebrugge had been considered by Admiral Sir Lewis Bayly, commander of the Coast of Ireland Station. The plan was rejected due to the difficulty of supplying a landing force and the vulnerability of such a force to a land counter-attack; subsequent proposals were rejected for the same reasons. A bombardment of the Zeebrugge lock gates under cover of a smoke screen was studied by Vice-Admiral Sir Reginald Bacon, commander of the Dover Patrol and the Admiralty in late 1915 but was also rejected as too risky. In 1916, Commodore Reginald Tyrwhitt proposed an attack to block Zeebrugge, which was rejected. Tyrwhitt suggested a more ambitious operation to capture the mole and the town as a prelude to advancing on Antwerp. Bacon was asked to give his opinion and rejected the plan, as did the Admiralty.

Rear-Admiral Roger Keyes was appointed director of the Plans Division at the Admiralty in October 1917 and on 3 December submitted another plan for the blocking of Zeebrugge and Ostend using old cruisers in a night attack in the period from 14 to 19 March. Bacon also proposed an operation on 18 December, which combined Tyrwhitt's landing on the mole with a blocking operation. A monitor, HMS Sir John Moore, was to land 1,000 troops on the mole, the monitor HMS General Craufurd was to bombard the lock gates and fortifications from short range; the blockships were to enter the harbour in the confusion. The raid was proposed in 1917 by Admiral Sir John Jellicoe but was not authorised until Keyes adapted Bacon's plan for a blocking operation, to make it difficult for German ships and U-boats to leave the port. The raid was approved in January 1918 and volunteer crews were obtained from the Grand Fleet "to perform a hazardous service".

=== Tactical developments ===
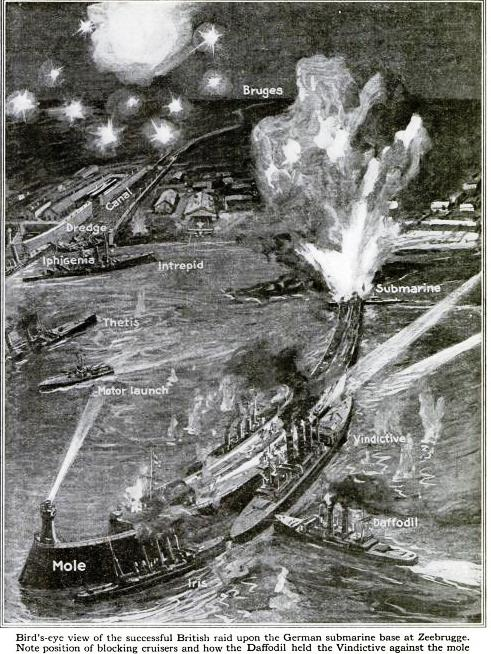
Graphic depiction of the raid from Popular Science magazine, July 1918

The possibility of a landing on the Belgian coast was not abandoned, despite the number of rejected plans and early in 1917, Bacon assisted in the planning of Operation Hush, landings by the three brigades of the 1st Division around Middelkerke at the northern extremity of the Western Front. The operation was dependent on the advance of the British armies in the Third Battle of Ypres and had no influence on events at Zeebrugge and Ostend. If landings at the ports were successful, the forces involved would be doomed unless they were relieved by the advance of the armies in Flanders. Bacon devised a plan to destroy the lock gates at Zeebrugge by bombardment with the 15-inch guns (38 cm) of the monitors HMS Erebus, HMS Terror and HMS Marshal Soult.

The bombardment would have to be undertaken at long range, because of the danger of return fire from the Kaiser Wilhelm battery at Knokke and meant aiming at a target 90 by 30 sq ft (8.4 by 2.8 m^{2}) in area at a range of 13 nmi (15 mi; 24 km), using directions from an artillery-observation aircraft. Bacon calculated that 252 shells would be necessary and that it would take at least 84 minutes to fire them. If the attempt began with surprise and the bombardment ships were obscured by a smoke screen, the German guns at Knokke might not have enough time accurately to return fire before the bombardment ended. Bacon thought that the destruction of the lock gates was worth the sacrifice of a monitor but that risking all three for no result was impossible to avoid.

The plan needed a rare combination of wind, tide and weather; to obtain surprise the monitors would need to be in position before dawn. Mist and low cloud would make artillery observation from an aircraft impossible and the wind would have to be blowing from a narrow range of bearings or the smoke screen would be carried over the ships and out to sea, exposing them to view from the shore. Such conditions were unlikely to recur for several days, making a bombardment on the following day most unlikely. The bombardment force sailed for Zeebrugge three times but changes in the weather forced a return to England each time. (Note: Three 15-inch monitors, a 12-inch monitor, "M" monitors 24 and 26, two destroyer flotilla leaders, Botha and Faulknor, eight destroyers from the 6th Flotilla, Lochinvar, Landrail, Lydiard, Mentor, Moorsom, Morris, Mermaid and Racehorse, six paddle minesweepers and 19, motor-launches. Tyrwhitt, with two cruisers and twelve destroyers of the Harwich Force, covered the operation.) On 11 May, Bacon ordered another attempt for the next day; a buoy was laid 15 nmi (17 mi; 28 km) to the north-west of the mole as a guide and a second buoy was placed in the bombardment position. A bearing was taken from the buoy to the base of the mole at Zeebrugge by a ship sailing from the buoy to the mole, despite a mist which reduced visibility to one mile (1.6 km) and the ship advancing perilously close to German shore batteries. The ship returned to the buoy by 4:45 a.m., with the bearing and distance. The bombardment ships had taken position, the Motor Launches had formed a line, ready to generate the smokescreen and the escorts formed a square around the monitors. Five destroyers zigzagged around the flotilla as a screen against U-boats, the minesweepers began operating around the monitors and the covering force cruised in the distance, ready to intercept a German destroyer sortie.

==== Zeebrugge, 12 May 1917 ====
The bombardment opened late because of the need to tow Marshal Soult, slowing the armada and also by a haze off the harbour. Two Royal Naval Air Service (RNAS) artillery-observation aircraft from Dunkirk, which had taken off at 2:00 a.m., had to wait from 3:00 a.m. over Zeebrugge for almost two hours. The aircraft were met by seven Sopwith Pups from 4 (Naval) Squadron RNAS, which patrolled the coast from 5:45 a.m. as six Sopwith Triplanes of 10 (Naval) Squadron RNAS flew over the fleet. One of the artillery-observation aircraft had engine trouble and force-landed in the Netherlands; the other ran short of petrol. Firing from the monitors was opened just after 5:00 a.m. and at first fell short; many of the shells failed to explode, which left the aircraft unable to signal the fall of shot. The accuracy of the bombardment improved soon after; Marshal Soult hit the target with its twelfth shell and Erebus with its twenty-sixth. Terror was most hampered by the loss of one of the aircraft and by dud shells; only forty-five of the 250 shells fired were reported and the observation aircraft had to return because of fuel shortage at 5:30 a.m., leaving the last half-hour of the bombardment reliant on estimated corrections of aim. Two relieving aircraft also had engine trouble and failed to arrive.

In the first hour of the bombardment, German retaliation was limited to anti-aircraft fire and attempts to jam the wireless of the artillery-observation aircraft. When the Pups from 4 (Naval) Squadron arrived, twice their number of German Albatros fighters engaged them and some of the aircraft from over the fleet, which joined in the dogfight. The British claimed five German aircraft shot down and the fleet was able to complete the bombardment. A third patrol later shot down a German seaplane into Ostend harbour and lost one fighter. At 6:00 a.m. the ships weighed anchor, just as the Kaiser Wilhelm battery opened fire. Two seaplanes which attempted to approach the fleet were driven off by British fighter seaplanes, which escorted the fleet home. Bacon returned with the impression that the bombardment had succeeded but aerial photographs taken the following week revealed that about fifteen shells had landed within a few yards of the lock gates on the western side and four shells had fallen just as close on the eastern side. The basin north of the locks had been hit and some damage caused to the docks but Zeebrugge remained open to German destroyers and U-boats. The Admiralty concluded that had the monitors been ready to fire as soon as the observer in the artillery-observation aircraft signalled or if the shoot had been reported throughout, the lock gates would have been hit. Bacon made preparations to bombard Ostend harbour.

==== Ostend, 5 June 1917 ====
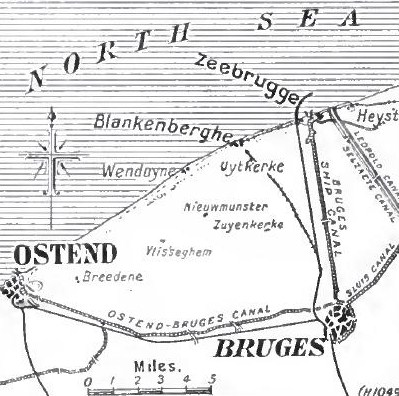
Bruges docks and the approaches from Ostend and Zeebrugge

Attempts to bombard Ostend on 26 and 27 May were abandoned because of poor weather but on 4 June, the bombardment ships sailed for the Ratel Bank off Ostend; the bombardment force was smaller and the covering force larger than for the Zeebrugge operation, since surprise was less likely. (Note: Erebus and Terror, two flotilla leaders, six destroyers, two P-boats and twelve Motor Launches.) The Harwich Force provided four light cruisers, a flotilla leader and eight destroyers as a covering force off the Thornton Bank and a second wave of four light cruisers and eight destroyers to guard against an attack from the Schouwen Bank. The firing buoy and its bearing and range from the target were established using the Zeebrugge method and the escorting ships formed a square around the bombardment ships.

Sint-Petrus-en-Pauluskerk, Ostend

German destroyers were sighted east of the Ratel Bank at 1:42 a.m. by HMS Lance and Lochinvar which were steering towards Ostend to establish the range and bearing of the target from the sighting buoy. The German destroyers frustrated two attempts to enter the harbour, which left the fleet without sighting data and reliant on dead reckoning. At about 2:30 a.m., gunfire was heard from the direction of the covering force to the north and at about 3:00 a.m. the bombardment force Motor Launches began to lay a smokescreen. At dawn the coast became visible and Bacon corrected the position by taking a bearing on Sint-Petrus-en-Pauluskerk. The bombardment commenced at 3:20 a.m., German coastal guns replied within minutes and fired accurately at Erebus and Terror but with no effect.

The British bombardment ceased at 4:00 a.m.; the fleet weighed anchor at 4:20 a.m. and withdrew northwards. The covering force guarded the ships from a point 5 nmi (5.8 mi; 9.3 km) distant, having engaged two German destroyers as they tried to reach Zeebrugge, sinking S20. Ostend was a larger target than Zeebrugge and could be seen from the sea, which made accurate shooting easier. The dockyard was hit by twenty out of 115 shells and intelligence reports noted the sinking of a lighter, a UC-boat, damage to three destroyers and that the German command had been made anxious about the security of the coast. Had Bacon been able to repeat the shore bombardments at short intervals, naval operations from the Flanders coast by the Germans would have been much more difficult to organise. More bombardments were planned but these were all postponed because essential conditions of tide and weather were not met. After several months, the bombardments resumed but the Germans had been able to repair the damage. As the long methodical bombardments of Ostend and Zeebrugge had proved impractical, Bacon attached a large monitor to the forces which patrolled coastal barrages, ready to exploit opportunities of favourable wind and weather to bombard Zeebrugge and Ostend, which occurred several times but had no effect on the working of the ports.

== Prelude ==
=== German defences ===
By 1917 the German defences on the Flanders coast included Kaiser Wilhelm II, a heavy artillery battery at Knokke, east of the Bruges Canal, of four 12 in (300 mm) guns, with a range of 41,000 yd (23 mi; 37 km) and the Tirpitz battery of four 11 in (280 mm) guns, with a range of 35,000 yd (20 mi; 32 km), 1.5 mi (2.4 km) west of Ostend. Two more batteries were being built in early 1917 and between the main defences were many mobile guns, entrenchments and machine-gun nests. The only vulnerable part of the German defensive system was the lock gates at Zeebrugge, the destruction of which would make the canal to Bruges tidal and drastically reduce the number of ships and submarines that could pass along it.

=== British preparations ===
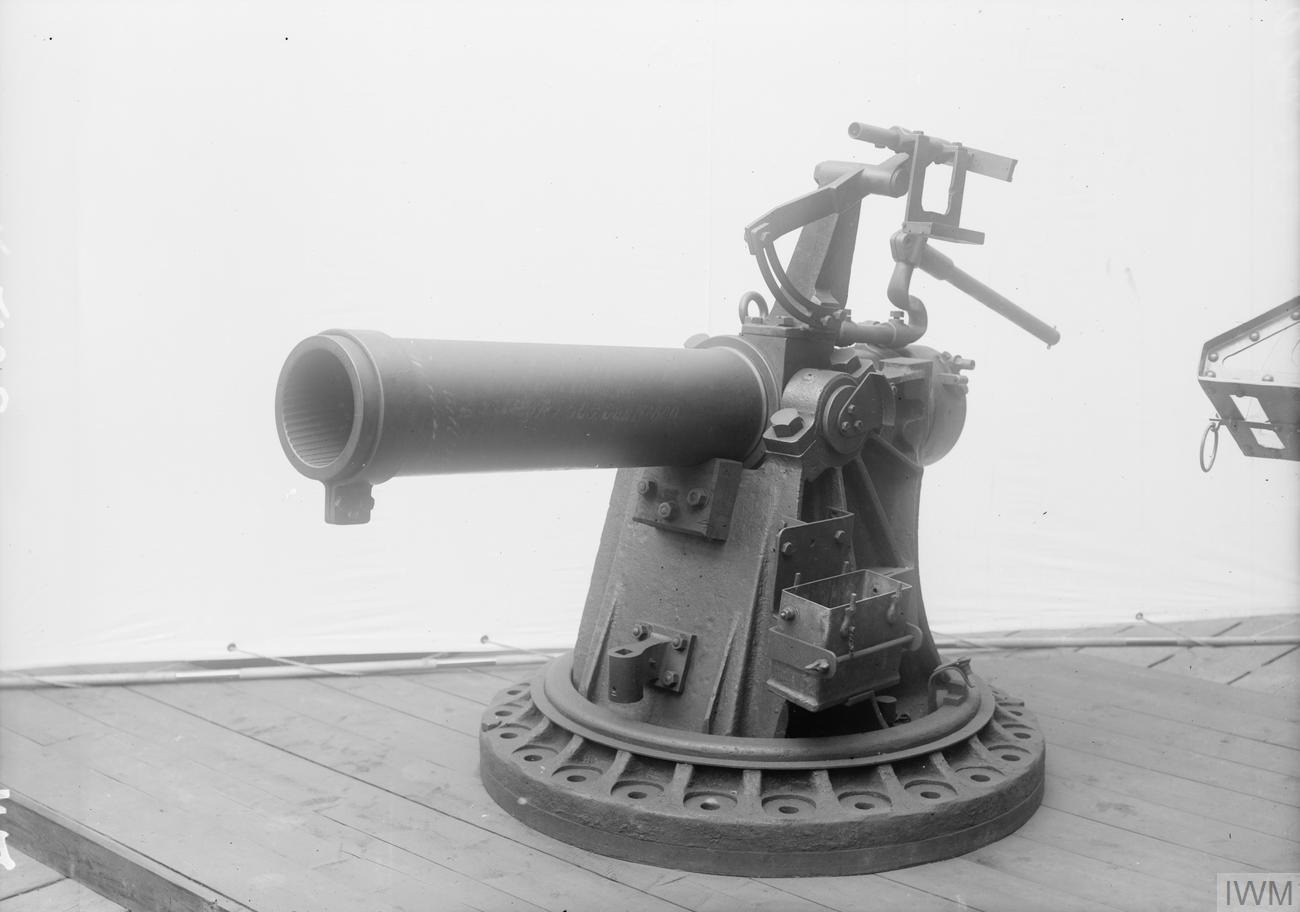
7.5-inch howitzer (19 cm) fitted to HMS Vindictive for the raid

An appeal was made to the Grand Fleet for volunteers for special service on 23 February 1918. (Note: Leading Stoker Norbert McCrory recalled that "On 23rd Feb 1918.... We... received a wireless [communication] asking for volunteers to the numbers of eleven men, for special service. On receiving the message, Seamen and Stokers were asked to volunteer. Soon it was seen all who wished to go could not be accepted, much to their disappointment. Only eleven were chosen". Lieutenant Commander Ronald Boddie recalled, "It was the 1st March when I joined the Hindustan [at Chatham] with 40 other officers, 200 seamen and 250 stokers, all from the Grand Fleet. The Hindustan was an elderly battleship and was to be our home until the expedition was ready to sail".) Very few of the participants were aware of the objective. (Note: Able Seaman William O'Hara recalled the moment when he reported at Chatham Barracks, "There was great speculations as to what we were there for but no one could satisfy our curiosity. We were eventually detailed off into four sections, men belonging to ships of the same squadron being detailed to the same section".) The cruisers involved in the blockade, including HMS Vindictive, were equipped in Chatham by over 2,000 workers for the special fitting out or (in the case of the ships to be sunk) stripping out of unnecessary equipment, including their masts. Iris, Daffodil and the submarines were converted in Portsmouth. The fleet made its rendezvous at Swin Deep, about 8 nmi (9.2 mi; 15 km) south of Clacton. The first opportunity for the raid was early April 1918 and on 2 April the fleet sailed and Zeebrugge was bombed by 65 Squadron from Dunkirk. The success of the raid depended upon smokescreens to protect the British ships from the fire of German coastal artillery but the wind direction was unfavourable and the attack was called off. Zeebrugge was visible to the fleet and the fleet to the Germans in Zeebrugge; seventy-seven ships of all sizes, some with their lights already switched off, had to make a sharp turn to the west to return to their bases.

== Raid ==
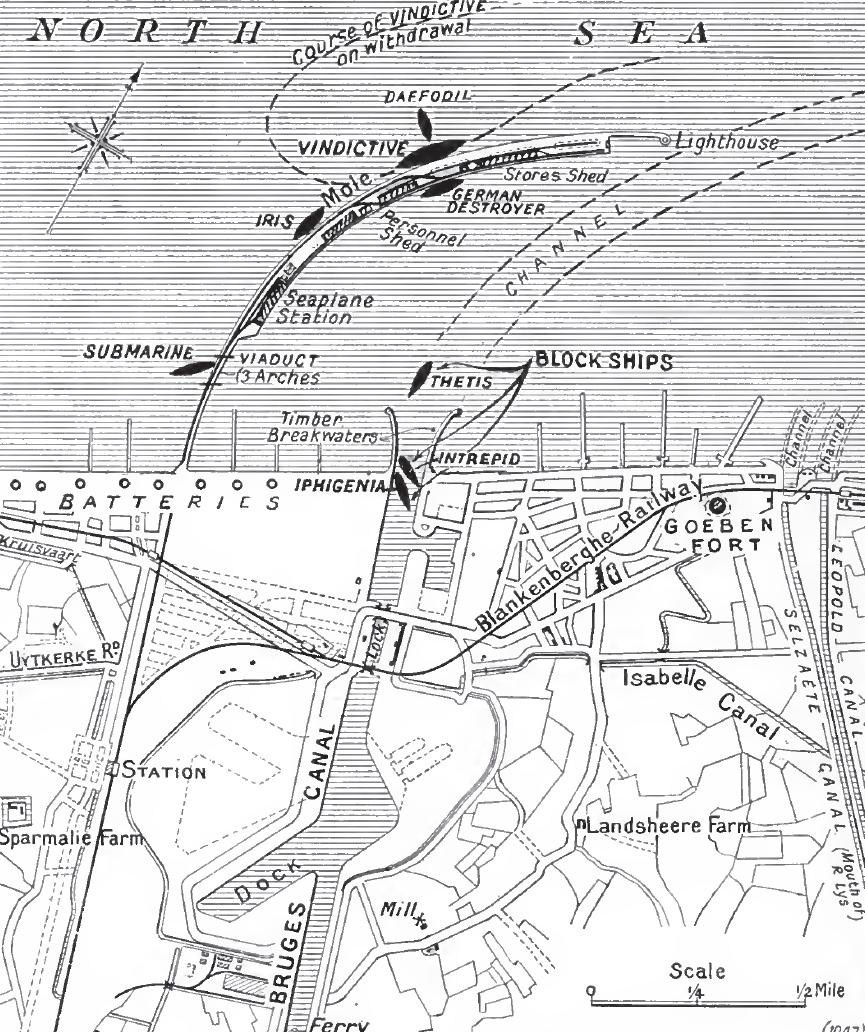
The blocking of Zeebrugge (true order is Intrepid, Iphigenia and Thetis south to north)

A second attempt was made on 23 April, in conjunction with a raid on the neighbouring harbour of Ostend. The raid began with a diversion against the one-mile-long (1.6 km) Zeebrugge mole, led by the old cruiser, Vindictive, with two Mersey ferries, Daffodil and Iris II. The three ships were accompanied by two old submarines, which were filled with explosives to blow up the viaduct connecting the mole to the shore. Vindictive was to land a force of 200 sailors and a battalion of Royal Marines, at the entrance to the Bruges–Ostend Canal, to destroy German gun positions. During the landing the wind changed and the smokescreen to cover the ship was blown offshore. The marines immediately came under massed fire and suffered many casualties. Vindictive was spotted by German gunners and forced to land in the wrong place, resulting in the loss of the marines' heavy gun support. Eventually the submarine HMS C3 commanded by Lieutenant Richard Sandford, destroyed the viaduct when its demolition charge exploded.

The attempt to sink three old cruisers to block the flow of traffic in and out of the Port of Bruges-Zeebrugge failed. The failure of the attack on the Zeebrugge mole resulted in the Germans concentrating their fire on the three blocking ships, HMS Thetis, Intrepid and Iphigenia, which were filled with concrete. Thetis, which had been ordered to ram the lock gates at the end of the channel, was severely damaged by German fire and collided with a submerged wire net, which disabled both of its engines. Starting to sink before reaching the main channel, the crew of Thetis coaxed enough power from the engines to bring it over a dredged part of the outer channel and scuttled the ship. The two other ships were sunk at the narrowest point of the canal. The submarines C1 (Lieutenant A. C. Newbold) and C3 were old, manned by volunteer crews of one other officer and four ratings. They had five tons of amatol packed into their fore-ends and were to be driven into the viaduct and then blown up, to prevent reinforcement of the German garrison on the mole. The crews were to abandon their submarines shortly before the collision with the viaduct, leaving the submarines to steer themselves automatically. During the passage from Dover, C1 parted with its tow and arrived too late to take part in the operation. (Note: Submarine C3: Lieutenant Richard Sandford, R.N. wounded, Lieutenant J. Howell Price, D.S.C., R.N.R., Coxswain, Petty-Officer W. Harner, O.N. 228795 wounded, E.R.A. A. G. Roxburgh, O.N. 272242, Leading Seaman W.G. Mayer, On.N. 22196, Stoker 1., H. C. Bindall, O.N. K5343 wounded. Submarine C1: Lieutenant A.C. Newbold, R.N., Lieutenant S.A. Bayford, D.S.C., R.N.R., Petty-Officer H. G. Jones, L.T.O., O.N. 17 994, Petty Officer G. T. Newman, O.N. 213236 Coxswain, E.R.A. W. H. R. Coward, O.N. 1495, Stoker Petty-Officer F. J. Smith, O.N. 299134.) Sandford elected to steer C3 into the viaduct manually instead of depending on the automatic system.

== Aftermath ==
=== Analysis ===
==== Zeebrugge ====
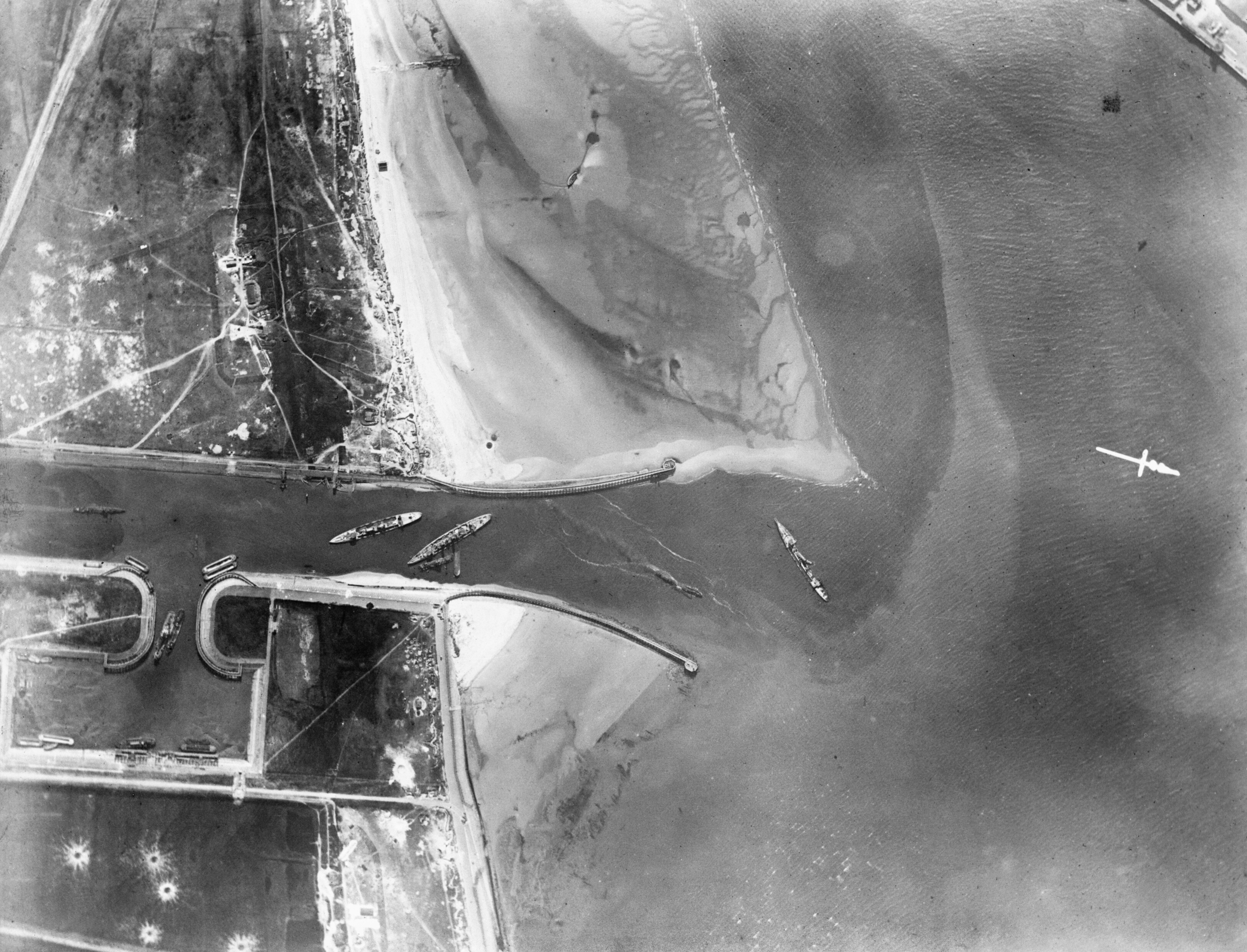
Channel obstructed after the raid; (Left to right) HMS Intrepid, HMS Iphigenia and HMS Thetis. The obstructions are not enough to prevent U-boats from sailing out at high tide.

In 1931, the official historian, Sir Henry Newbolt, wrote that before the raid, two submarines entered or left the Flanders bases each day and continued at that rate during the week after the raid. The block ships were sunk in the wrong position and the canal was only obstructed for a few days. The Germans removed two piers in the western bank of the canal near the block ships and dredged a channel through the silt near their sterns. At high tide, U-boats could move along the new channel past the block ships.

The average number of passages was maintained until June, when the rate fell to about one submarine per day, to an extent due to a bombardment of Zeebrugge on 9 June. After the damage was repaired, the rate of U-boat traffic did not return to the pre-raid level. Newbolt considered that the reduced traffic was caused by the recall of some U-boats to Germany in June, after reports that operations in the Dover Straits had become too dangerous. The usual remedy, of increasing the number of destroyer raids, was not possible because of the difficulty in using Zeebrugge as a harbour.

Newbolt wrote that the raid on Zeebrugge was part of an anti-submarine campaign which had lasted for five months, using patrols and minefields to close the Straits and which continued despite the most destructive sortie achieved by the Germans during the war. The British anti-submarine measures inflicted a steady attrition of the Flanders U-boats and the attack on Zeebrugge came when the German blockade of Britain was supposed to have reduced drastically the resources and endurance of the British Empire. News of the raid was skilfully exploited to raise Allied morale and to foreshadow victory Possunt quia posse videntur ("They can because they think they can"). Bacon wrote in 1931 that he was a seagoing commander with intimate knowledge of the tidal and navigational conditions in the Ostend and Zeebrugge areas; operational failures were due in part to the appointment of Keyes (an Admiralty man) and his changes to plans Bacon had laid.

==== Ostend ====
Ostend had been attacked at the same time as the attempt on Zeebrugge but this effort was a failure. Believing the Zeebrugge raid to have been effective, the British undertook the Second Ostend Raid on 9 May, in which Vindictive and another cruiser HMS Sappho were sunk as a blockships. The plan took guidance from the experience gained at Zeebrugge.

=== Casualties ===
Of the 1,700 men involved in the operation, S. F. Wise recorded in 1981 that 300 were wounded and more than 200 killed. Kendall gave figures of 227 dead and 356 wounded. The destroyer HMS North Star was sunk. Among the dead was Wing Commander Frank Brock, the man who devised and commanded the smoke screen. Archibald Low, inventor of the wireless-guided drone aircraft, said "the preparation of bombs, which although successful, only just operated in time for Commander Brock to see them in the last hours of his life at Zeebrugge". (Note: Archibald Low, The First Guided Missile "rocket experiments were conducted under my own patents with the help of Cdr. Brock, a truly great man who lost his life at Zeebrugge. For that Mole attack I had prepared a radio-fired bomb device by which any one of a number of floating buoys could be selected and exploded by radio".) (Note: IWM - Royal Flying Corps Feltham Transmitter for the selective firing of floating mines for use in the Zeebrugge raid.) Most of the casualties were buried in England either because they died of their wounds en route or because the survivors recovered their bodies. The Zeebrugge plot of St James's Cemetery, Dover has nine unidentified men and fifty named men who died on 23 April 1918 but most fatalities were returned to their families for local burial. (Note: Kendall lists the names of the fatalities and the locations of their graves, which are predominantly in the United Kingdom.) The Germans suffered casualties of eight dead and sixteen wounded.

== Victoria Cross ==
The Zeebrugge Raid was promoted by Allied propaganda as a British victory and eight Victoria Crosses were awarded. The 4th Battalion Royal Marines was awarded the Victoria Cross for the action. Under Rule 13 of the Victoria Cross warrant, a ballot was stipulated to select the recipients. Victoria Cross rules specify that four Victoria Crosses should be awarded this way (one to an officer, one to an NCO and two to other ranks) but they were not observed and only two Victoria Crosses were awarded. This was the last time that Victoria Crosses were awarded by ballot, although the rule remained within the Victoria Cross warrant. In a mark of respect to those involved in the raid, the Royal Marines have never raised another 4th Battalion.

A ballot was similarly held for the crews of the assault vessels for the Zeebrugge Mole (Vindictive, Royal Daffodil and Iris II) and the raiding parties. Victoria Crosses were awarded to Able Seaman Albert Edward McKenzie (Vindictive) and Captain Alfred Carpenter (commander of Vindictive). Lieutenant-Commander Arthur Harrison and Lieutenant-Commander George Bradford who led raiding parties from Vindictive and Iris II received posthumous VCs. Sergeant Norman Finch, Royal Marine Artillery, was selected by the 4th Battalion. Richard Sandford, commander of the submarine C.3 and Captain Edward Bamford who led the 4th Battalion were also awarded.

Gallery
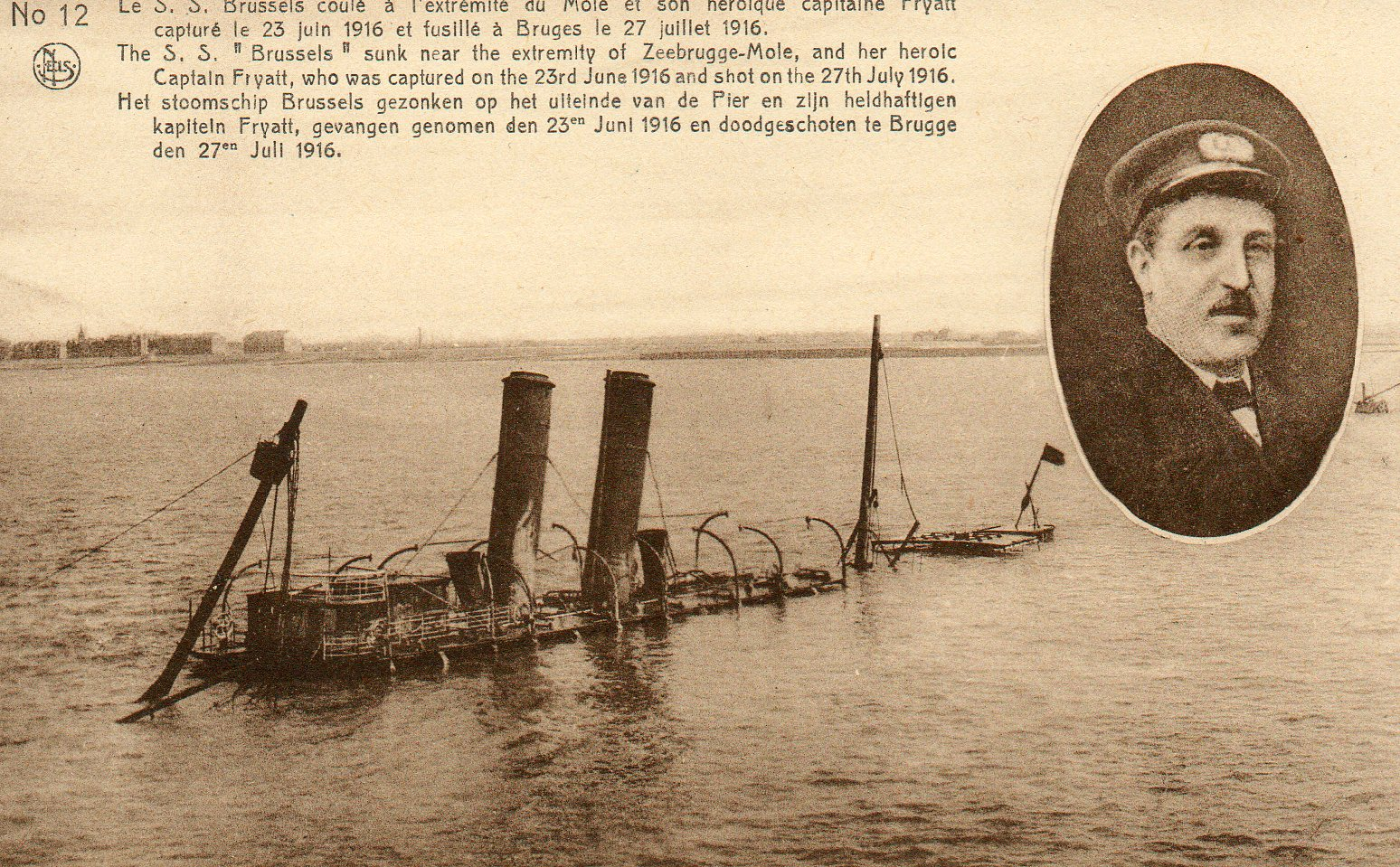
SS Brussels, torpedoed several times during the raid by the British and scuttled by the Germans in October 1918

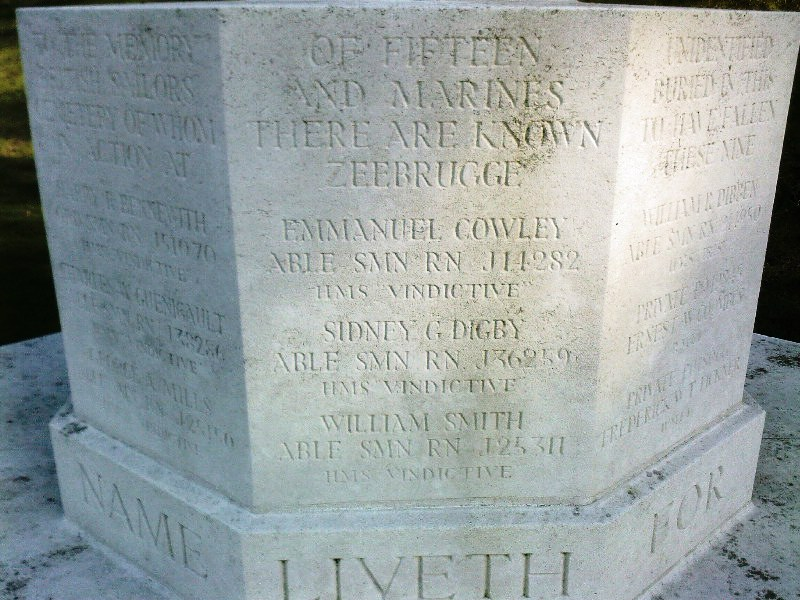
Dedication text of Zeebrugge Cross of Sacrifice in Dover

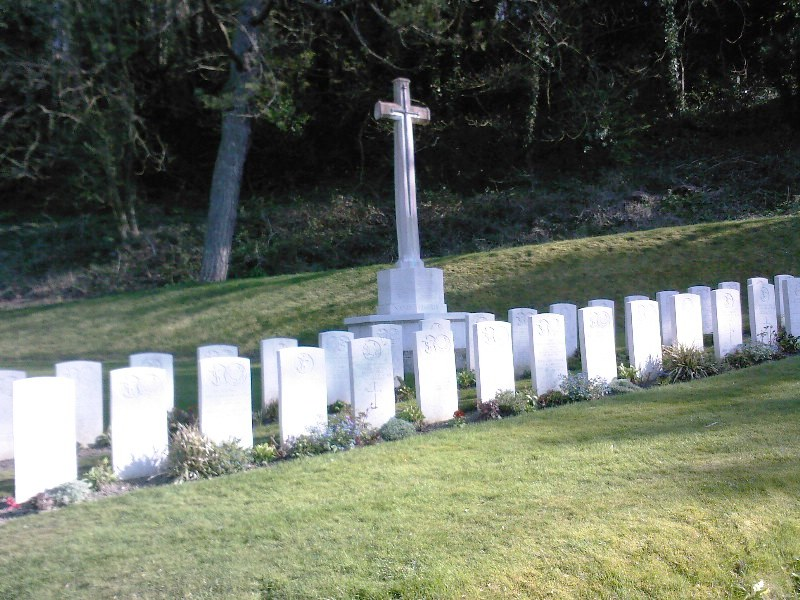
Zeebrugge Memorial and graves from St James Cemetery in Dover

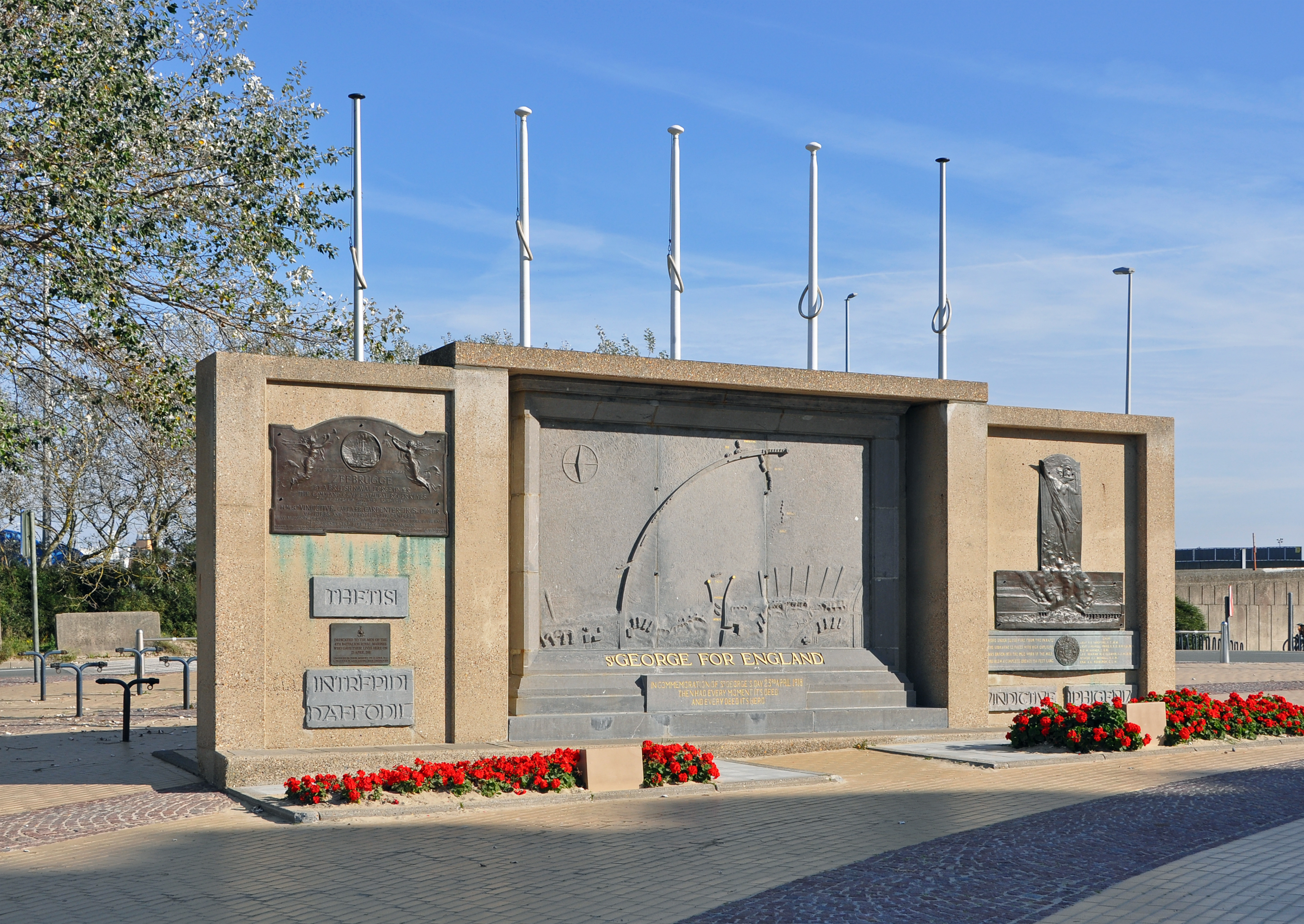
Saint George's Day memorial in Zeebrugge

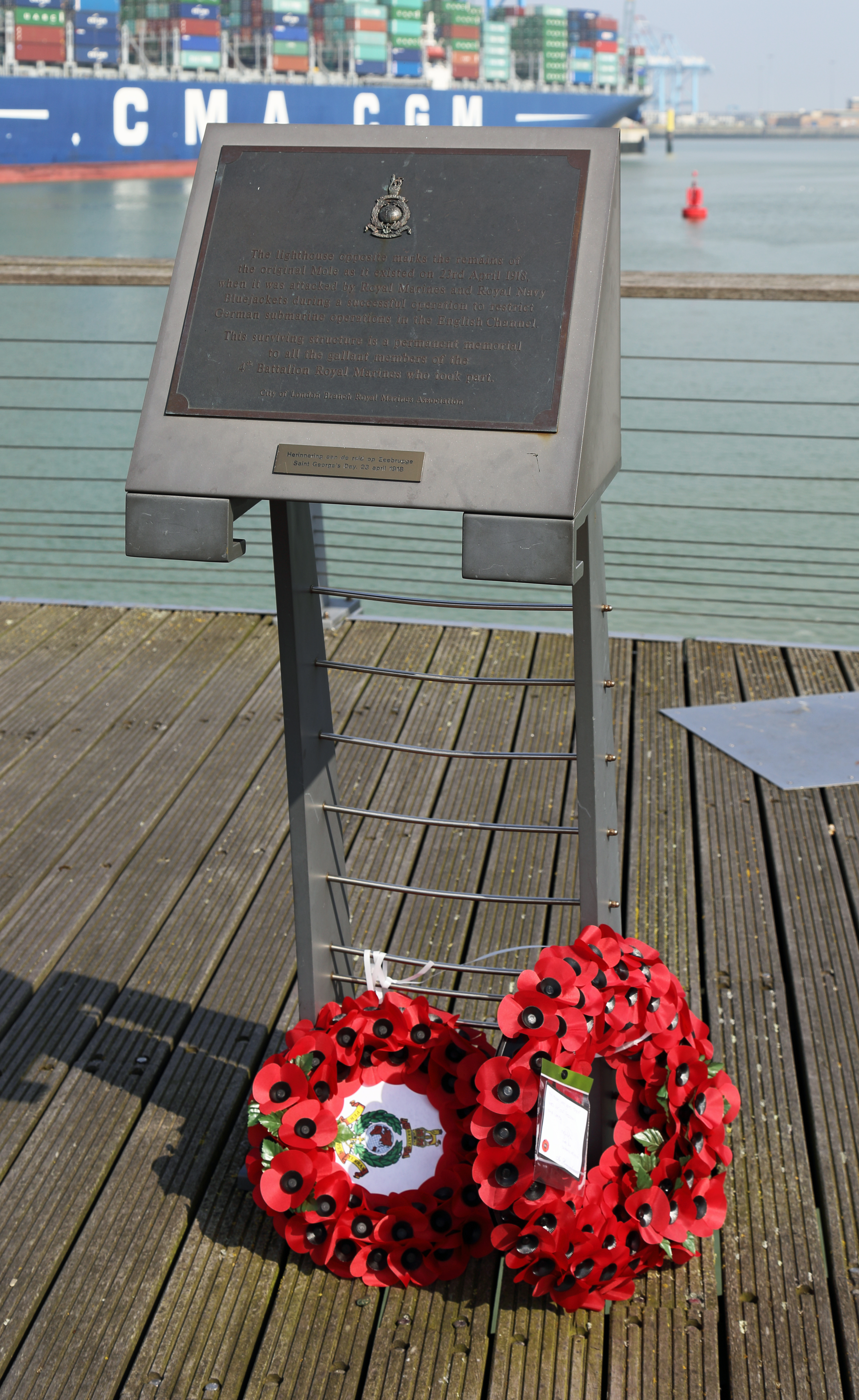
Commemorative plate in the port of Zeebrugge

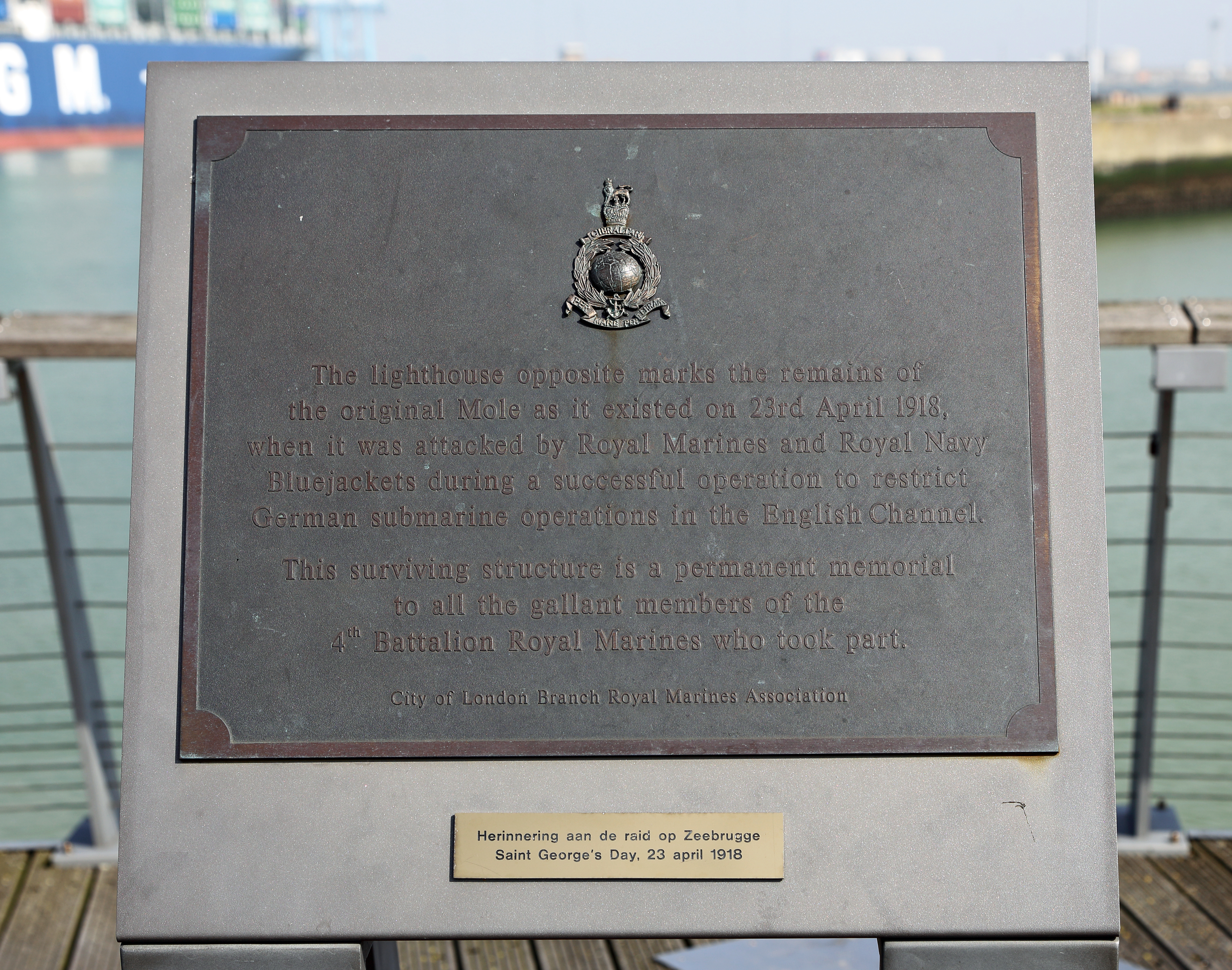
Detail of the commemorative plate in the port of Zeebrugge

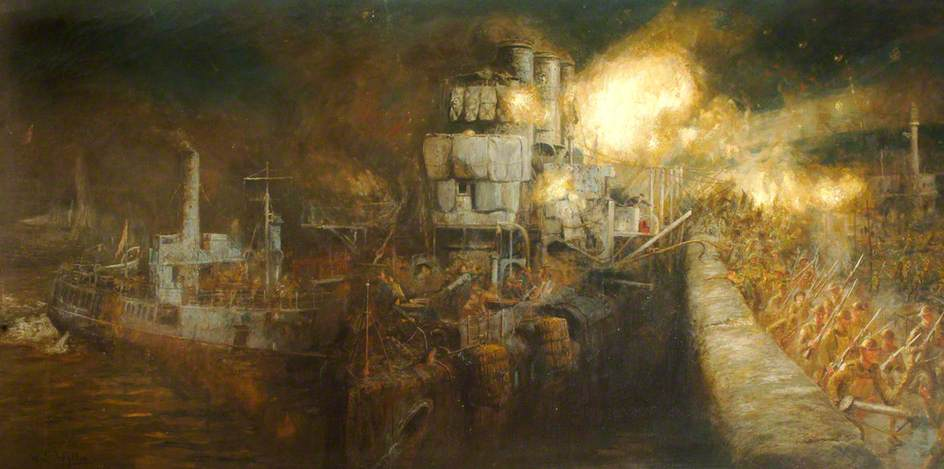
William Lionel Wyllie - The Storming of Zeebrugge Mole, St George's Day

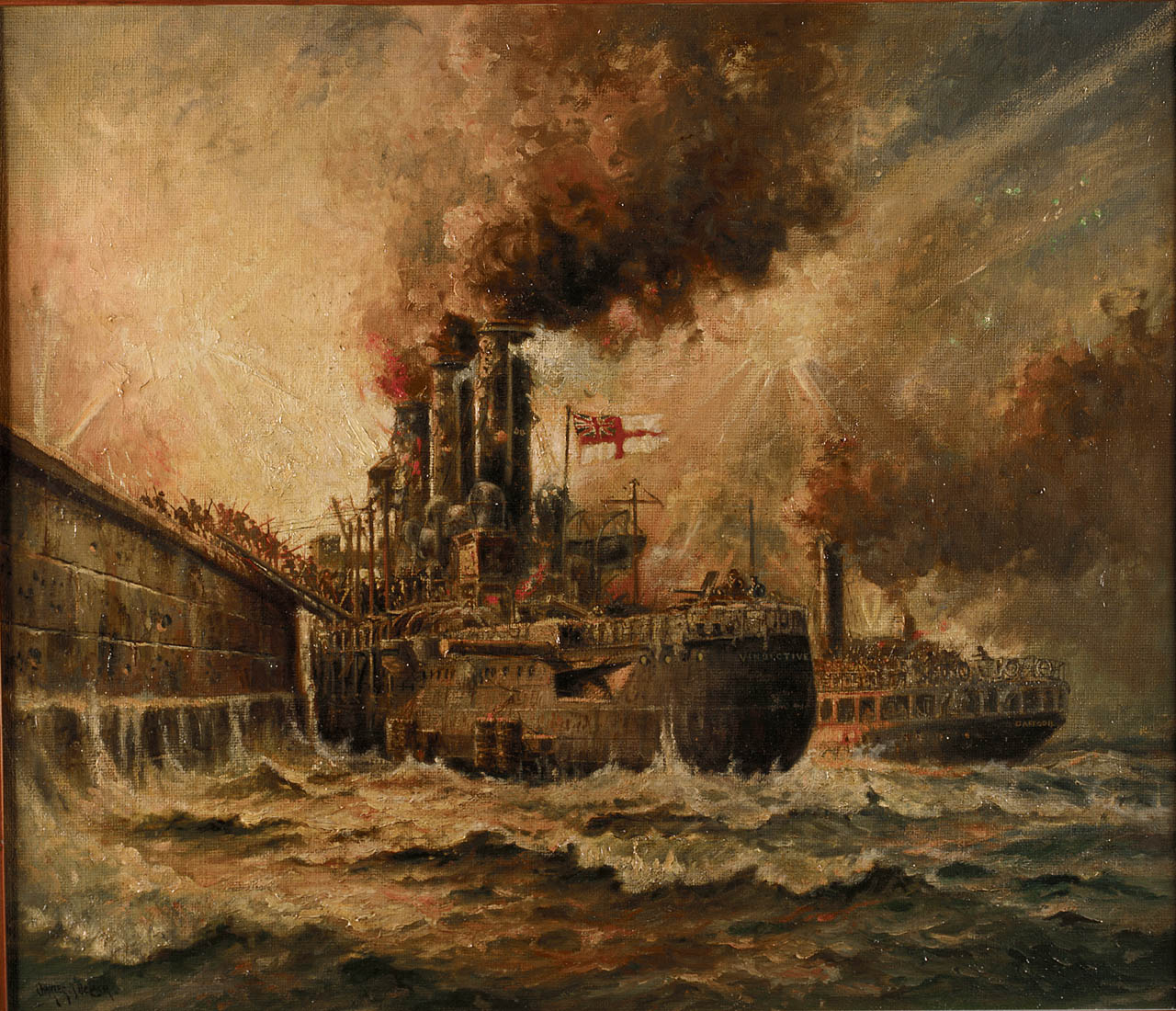
Charles John De Lacy - HMS Vindictive at Zeebrugge, 23 April 1918

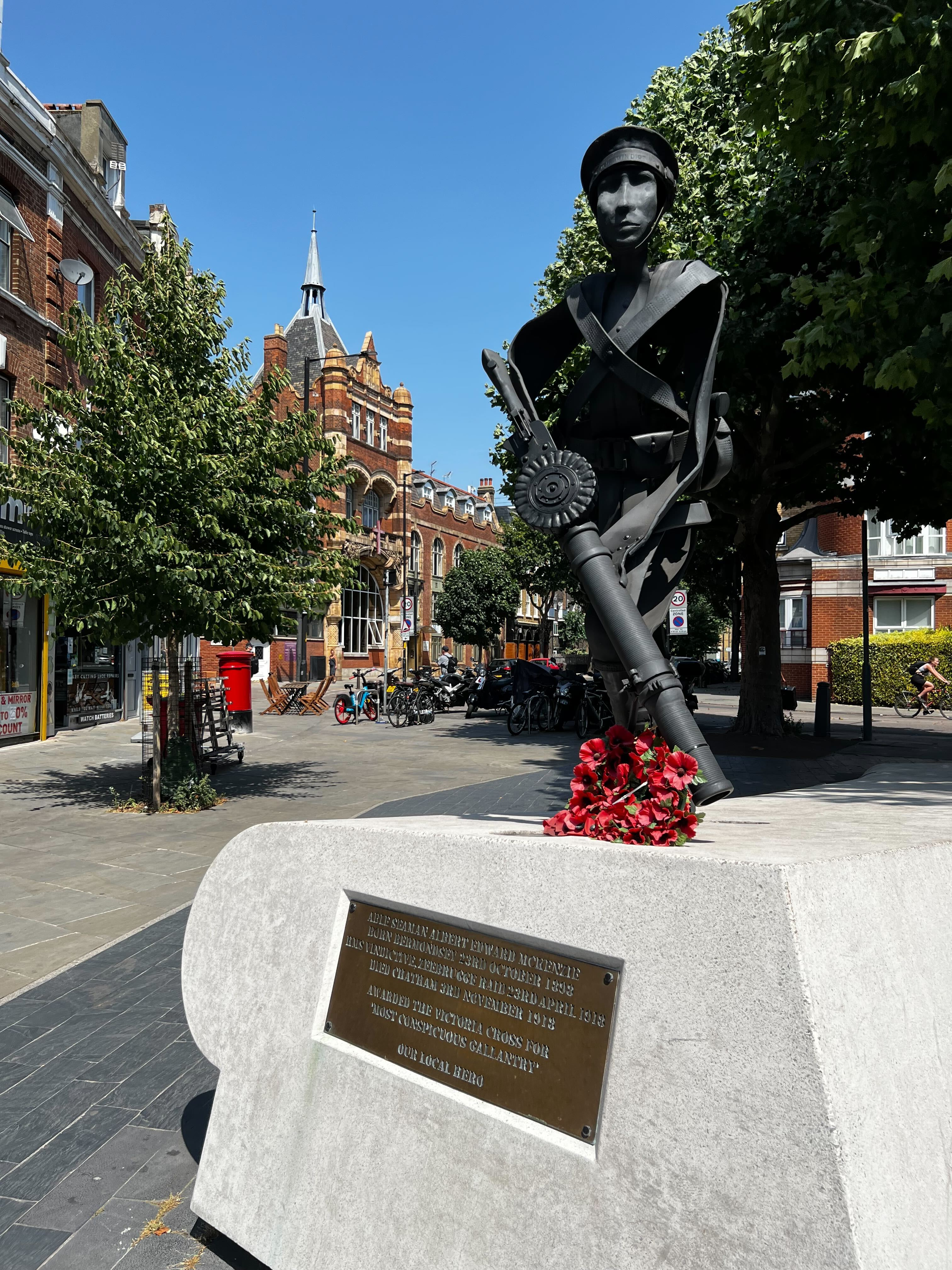
Monument in London to Albert Mckenzie for his role in the raid

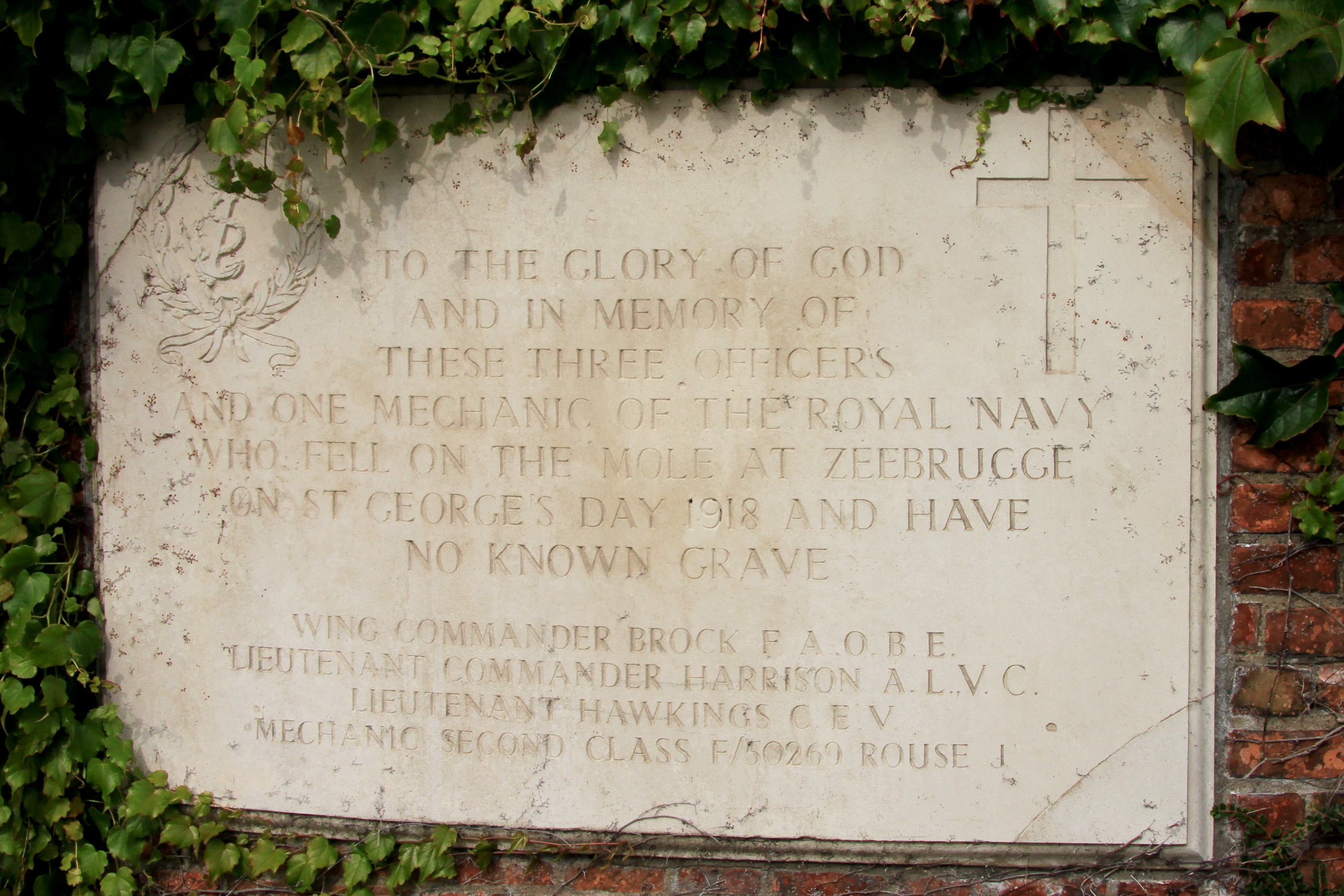
Memorial plaque for the missing in Zeebrugge Churchyard

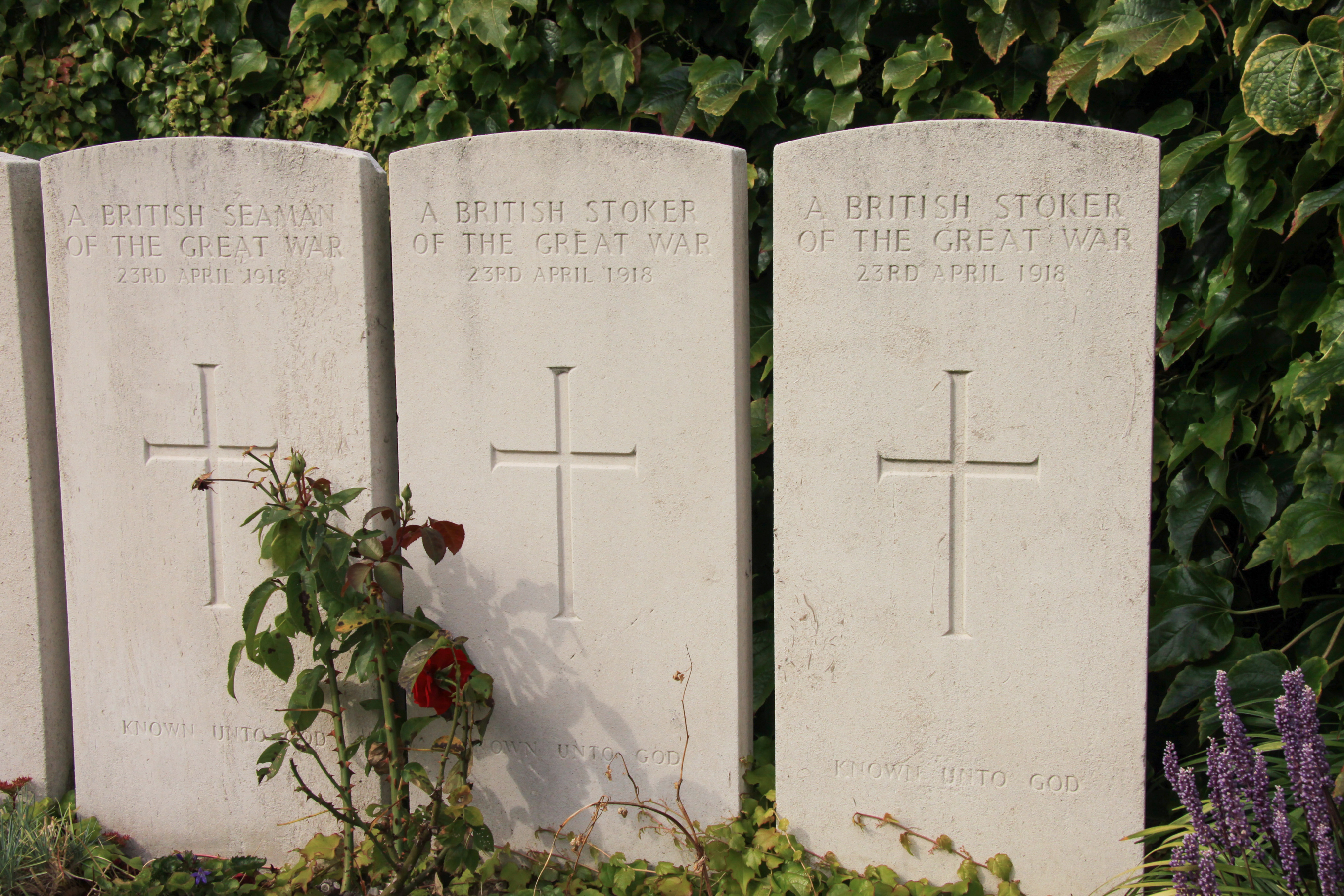
Graves of unidentified British casualties buried in Zeebrugge Churchyard

== Order of battle ==
Royal Navy order of battle for the Zeebrugge and Ostend Raids: 22 April 1918

- Assembled at the Swin Spitway (off the River Blackwater, Essex)
  - Assault vessels for the Zeebrugge Mole: HMS Vindictive (Arrogant-class cruiser), SS Royal Daffodil and Iris II (converted Mersey ferries)
  - Blockships for the Bruges Canal: HMS Thetis, HMS Intrepid and HMS Iphigenia (Apollo-class cruisers)
  - Blockships for Ostend Harbour: HMS Sirius and HMS Brilliant (Apollo-class cruisers)
- Assembled at Dover
  - Flagship, HMS Warwick (Admiralty W-class destroyer)
  - Unit L (to escort Vindictive): HMS Phoebe and HMS North Star (Admiralty M-class destroyers)
  - Unit M (to tow submarines): HMS Trident (Talisman-class destroyer) and HMS Mansfield (Hawthorn M-class destroyer)
  - Unit F (to patrol north of Zeebrugge): HMS Whirlwind (Admiralty W-class destroyer) and HMS Myngs (Admiralty M-class destroyer)
  - Unit R (to patrol north of Zeebrugge): HMS Velox (Admiralty V-class destroyer), HMS Morris, HMS Moorsom (Admiralty M-class destroyers) and HMS Melpomene (Medea-class destroyer)
  - Unit X (escort to Ostend blockships): HMS Tempest and HMS Tetrarch (R-class destroyer)
  - Submarines (to damage Zeebrugge viaduct): HMS C1 and HMS C3 (British C-class submarines), together with a picket boat to rescue crews
  - Minesweeper (to take off surplus crew from blockships): HMS Lingfield (Racecourse-class minesweeper)
  - Coastal motor boats (CMB), numbers 5, 7, 15, 16, 17, 21B, 22B, 23B, 24A, 25BD, 26B, 27A, 28A, 29A, 30B, 32A, 34A and 35A
  - Motor Launches (ML), numbers 79, 110, 121, 128, 223, 239, 241, 252, 258, 262, 272, 280, 282, 308, 314, 345, 397, 416, 420, 422, 424, 513, 525, 526, 533, 549, 552, 555, 557, 558, 560, 561 and 562
  - To bombard Zeebrugge: HMS Erebus and HMS Terror (Erebus-class monitors)
  - Escort to Zeebrugge monitors: HMS Termagant (Talisman-class destroyer), HMS Truculent (Yarrow Later M-class destroyer) and HMS Manly (Yarrow M-class destroyer)
  - Outer Patrol off Zeebrugge: HMS Attentive (Adventure-class cruiser), HMS Scott (Admiralty type flotilla leader), HMS Ulleswater (Yarrow Later M-class destroyer), HMS Teazer and HMS Stork (R-class destroyers)
- Assembled at Dunkirk
  - Monitors (to bombard Ostend): HMS Marshal Soult (Marshal Ney-class monitor), HMS Lord Clive, HMS Prince Eugene, HMS General Craufurd (Lord Clive-class monitors), HMS M24, HMS M26 and HMS M21 (M15-class monitors)
  - Outer Patrol off Ostend: HMS Swift (destroyer leader), HMS Faulknor (Faulknor-class flotilla leader), HMS Matchless, HMS Mastiff (Thornycroft M-class destroyers) and HMS Afridi (1905 Tribal-class destroyer)
  - Escort to Ostend monitors: HMS Mentor (Hawthorn M-class destroyer), HMS Lightfoot (Marksman-class flotilla leader), HMS Zubian (Tribal-class destroyer) and French Navy destroyers Lestin, Roux and Bouclier
  - Motor Launches (12 for smoke screens and 6 for escort to large monitors), Numbers 11, 16, 17, 22, 23, 30, 60, 105, 254, 274, 276, 279, 283, 429, 512, 532, 551, 556
  - French Navy torpedo boats (TB) and motor launches (escort to M-class monitors), TB numbers 1 and 2, ML numbers 33 and 3
  - Coastal Motor Boats (CMB): numbers 2, 4, 10 and 12 (40 ft class) and numbers 19A and 20A (55 ft class)
- Personnel participating in raids and covering operations
  - Royal Navy: 82 officers and 1,698 men including
    - Royal Marine Artillery: 2 officers and 58 men and
    - Royal Marine Light Infantry: 30 officers and 660 men

== See also ==
- St Nazaire Raid – a similar operation of the Second World War
