= HMS C3 =

Submarine of the Royal Navy

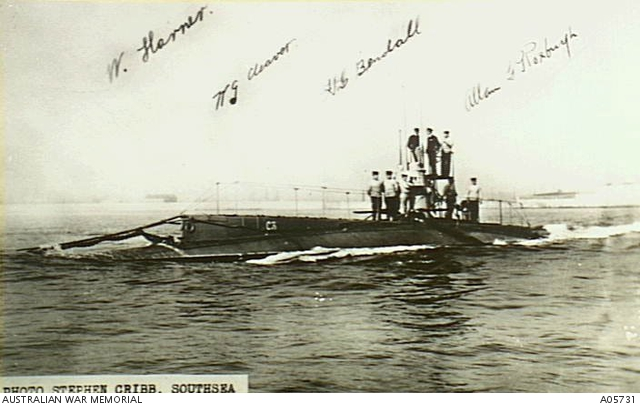
- C3 at Southsea, UK, circa. 1917

History

United Kingdom
- Name: HMS C3
- Builder: Vickers, Barrow
- Laid down: 13 November 1905
- Launched: 3 October 1906
- Commissioned: 23 February 1906
- Fate: Packed with explosives and rammed into the viaduct at Zeebrugge, Belgium, destroying the boat, 23 April 1918. Later scrapped.

General characteristics
- Class & type: C-class submarine
- Displacement: 287 long tons (292 t) surfaced; 316 long tons (321 t) submerged
- Length: 142 ft 3 in (43.4 m)
- Beam: 13 ft 7 in (4.1 m)
- Draught: 11 ft 6 in (3.5 m)
- Installed power: 600 bhp (450 kW) petrol; 300 hp (220 kW) electric
- Propulsion: 1 × 16-cylinder Vickers petrol engine; 1 × electric motor
- Speed: 12 kn (22 km/h; 14 mph) surfaced; 7 kn (13 km/h; 8.1 mph) submerged
- Range: 910 nmi (1,690 km; 1,050 mi) at 12 kn (22 km/h; 14 mph) on the surface
- Test depth: 100 feet (30.5 m)
- Complement: 2 officers and 14 ratings
- Armament: 2 × 18 in (450 mm) bow torpedo tubes

HMS C3 was one of 38 C-class submarines built for the Royal Navy in the first decade of the 20th century. The boat was used to demolish a viaduct during the Zeebrugge Raid in 1918.

== Design and description ==
The C class was essentially a repeat of the preceding B class, albeit with better performance underwater. The submarine had a length of 142 feet 3 inches (43.4 m) overall, a beam of 13 feet 7 inches (4.1 m) and a mean draught of 11 feet 6 inches (3.5 m). They displaced 287 long tons (292 t) on the surface and 316 long tons (321 t) submerged. The C-class submarines had a crew of two officers and fourteen ratings.

For surface running, the boats were powered by a single 16-cylinder 600-brake-horsepower (447 kW) Vickers petrol engine that drove one propeller shaft. When submerged the propeller was driven by a 300-horsepower (224 kW) electric motor. They could reach 12 knots (22 km/h; 14 mph) on the surface and 7 knots (13 km/h; 8.1 mph) underwater. On the surface, the C class had a range of 910 nautical miles (1,690 km; 1,050 mi) at 12 knots (22 km/h; 14 mph).

The boats were armed with two 18-inch (45 cm) torpedo tubes in the bow. They could carry a pair of reload torpedoes, but generally did not as they would have to remove an equal weight of fuel in compensation.

== Construction and career ==
C3 was built by Vickers at their Barrow-in-Furness shipyard, laid down on 13 November 1905 and was commissioned on 23 February 1906. The obsolete C3 was packed full of explosives for her last mission, which was to destroy a viaduct connecting the mole to the shore during the Zeebrugge Raid on 23 April 1918. Her commanding officer, Richard Douglas Sandford, received the Victoria Cross for the successful action.
