= Richard Sandford =

English recipient of the Victoria Cross

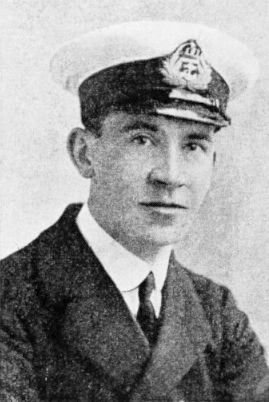
- Born: 11 May 1891; Cathedral Close, Exeter, Devon
- Died: 23 November 1918 (aged 27); Eston Hospital, Yorkshire
- Burial place: Eston Cemetery
- Relatives: Brigadier Daniel Sandford (brother)
- Military career
- Allegiance: United Kingdom
- Branch: Royal Navy
- Service years: 1904–1918
- Rank: Lieutenant
- Commands: HMS C3; HMS G11
- Conflicts: First World War: Zeebrugge Raid
- Awards: Victoria Cross

Richard Douglas Sandford, VC (11 May 1891 – 23 November 1918) was a Royal Navy officer and a recipient of the Victoria Cross, the highest award for gallantry in the face of the enemy that can be awarded to British and Commonwealth forces. He was a son of the Venerable Ernest Grey Sandford, Archdeacon of Exeter; his great-grandfather was Daniel Sandford, the Bishop of Edinburgh, and his brother was Brigadier Daniel Sandford.

== Biography ==
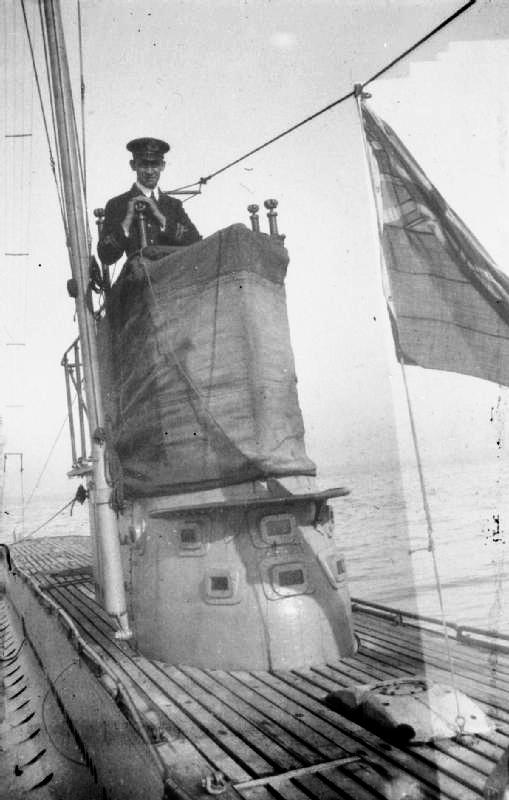
On the bridge of HMS C3

Richard Sandford was born on 11 May 1891. He attended Clifton College, whence he joined the Royal Navy. At 26 years old, he was a lieutenant commanding a submarine, HMS C3 in the Royal Navy during the First World War when he took part in the Zeebrugge Raid and won the Victoria Cross. The citation read:

On 22/23 April 1918 at Zeebrugge, Belgium, Lieutenant Sandford commanding HM Submarine C.3, skilfully placed the vessel between the piles of the viaduct which connected the Mole with the shore, before laying his fuse and abandoning her. He disdained to use the gyro steering which would have enabled him and his crew to abandon the submarine at a safe distance, but preferred to make sure that his mission would be successful.

Sandford died of typhoid fever at Eston Hospital, North Yorkshire, 12 days after the signing of the Armistice, and the day after his last command, HMS G11, had been wrecked on rocks off Howick, Northumberland. His Victoria Cross is displayed at the Britannia Royal Naval College, Dartmouth.
