= Blockship =

Ship deliberately sunk to prevent a river, channel, or canal from being used

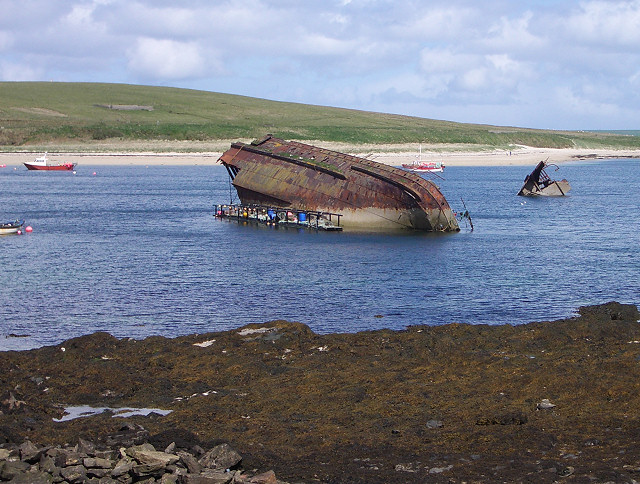
The wreck of SS Reginald, a blockship sunk in Weddell Bay in the Orkney Islands, Scotland in 1915

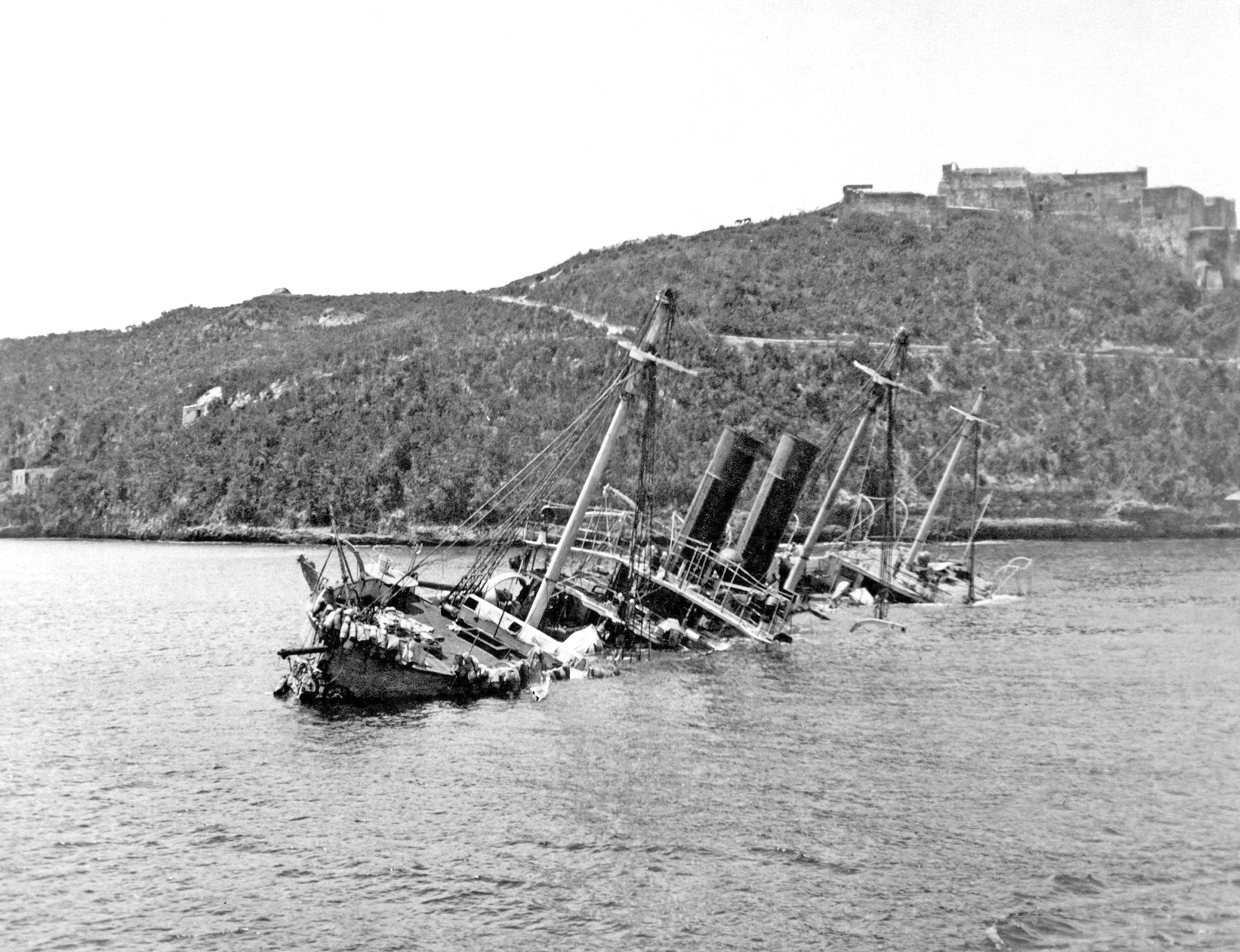
Cruiser Reina Mercedes, sunk by its own crew in the Spanish-American War, blocking access to the port of Santiago de Cuba.

A blockship is a ship deliberately sunk to prevent a river, channel, or canal from being used as a waterway. It may either be sunk by a navy defending the waterway to prevent the ingress of attacking enemy forces, as in the case of HMS Hood at Portland Harbour in 1914; or it may be brought by enemy raiders and used to prevent the waterway from being used by the defending forces, as in the case of the three old cruisers HMS Thetis, Iphigenia and Intrepid scuttled during the Zeebrugge raid in 1918 to prevent the port from being used by the German navy.

An early use was in 1667, during the Dutch Raid on the Medway and their attempts to do likewise in the Thames during the Second Anglo-Dutch War, when a number of warships and merchant ships commandeered by the Royal Navy were sunk in those rivers to attempt to stop the attacking forces. An even earlier use are the six 11th century Skuldelev ships in Roskilde Fjord, sunk to protect Roskilde from northern Vikings. They are now on display in the Viking Ship Museum.

The above is the principal and enduring meaning of 'block ship', but in the mid-19th century the term blockships was applied to two groups of mobile sea batteries developed by the Royal Commission on Coast Defence. The first batch of four was obtained from around 1845 by converting old sailing 74-gun two-deckers, all of them Vengeur-class ships of the line, into floating batteries, equipped with a steam/screw propulsion system. Also called "steam guardships", these conversions involved cutting down to a single deck, with ballast removed, and a jury rig installed with a medium 450-horsepower (340 kW) engine for speeds of 5.8–8.9 knots (10.7–16.5 km/h; 6.7–10.2 mph). These ships, converted in 1846, were Blenheim, Ajax, Hogue and Edinburgh. Although these ships were intended for coast defence some of them were used offensively, notably in the Baltic Campaign of 1854 and 1855, where they were an integral part of the British fleet. A second batch of five were similarly obtained from around 1855 by converting other elderly 74-gun ships; these were Russell, Cornwallis, Hawke, Pembroke and Hastings.

The most recent known use of blockships in warfare was during the annexation of Crimea by the Russian Federation. On 6 March 2014, the Russian Navy towed and scuttled the decommissioned cruiser Ochakov at the entrance to Donuzlav Bay in western Crimea, to prevent remaining Ukrainian navy vessels from leaving port. Less than 24 hours later, on 7 March, another blockship, the former Black Sea Fleet rescue/diving support vessel BM-416 was scuttled near Ochakov.

== See also ==
- Stone fleet
- Mulberry harbour
- Hulk (ship type)
- Guard ship
