= Edward Bamford =

Royal Marines officer & VC recipient (1887–1928)

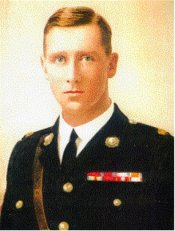
- Born: 28 May 1887; Highgate, England
- Died: 30 September 1928 (aged 41); On board HMS Cumberland, East China Sea
- Burial place: Shanghai, China
- Military career
- Allegiance: United Kingdom
- Branch: Royal Marines
- Service years: 1905–1928
- Rank: Major
- Units: Royal Marine Light Infantry
- Conflicts: First World War; North Sea campaign; Battle of Jutland; Zeebrugge Raid
- Awards: Victoria Cross; Distinguished Service Order; Order of Saint Anna, 3rd Class (Russia); Officer of the Legion of Honour (France); Order of the Rising Sun, 4th Class (Japan)

Edward Bamford, VC, DSO (28 May 1887 – 30 September 1928) was a Royal Marines officer and a recipient of the Victoria Cross, the highest award for gallantry in the face of the enemy that can be awarded to British and Commonwealth forces. Bamford was also awarded the Distinguished Service Order for his gallantry aboard HMS Chester during the Battle of Jutland.

== Early life and family ==
Edward Bamford was born on 28 May 1887 to the Rev. Robert Bamford and Blanch Edith Bamford (née Porter). The Rev. Robert Bamford served as curate of Lamarsh, Essex (1882–1885) and curate of Holy Trinity, Lambeth (1885–1886). In about 1892, he resigned his curacy due to ill health and settled in Sherborne, Dorset, living at Lynton House (now Abbot's Litten) in Long Street, Sherborne. From 1895 to 1898 he served as secretary to the Yeatman Hospital, Sherborne, and died at Sherborne on 9 November 1898, aged 44, and was buried in Sherborne Cemetery. After the Rev. Bamford's death Blanch married the Rev. Thomas Myers.

Bamford was educated at Sherborne Preparatory School, and later at Sherborne School, which he attended as a day boy from September 1900 until April 1902. His two brothers, Robert Bamford who was one of the founders of Aston Martin, and Arthur Bamford were also educated as day boys at Sherborne School. Arthur, who became a private in the Grenadier Guards, was killed near Loos on 11 October 1915 and is commemorated at St Mary's A.D.S. Cemetery, Haisnes, and on the Sherborne School War Memorial and Sherborne School Book of Remembrance. His sister Rachel Bamford (1885–1974) was in 1911 a student at the Colonial Training College at Stoke Prior, Bromsgrove, Worcestershire, and during the First World War she served in the Women's Army Auxiliary Corps (WAAC).

== Military career ==
In September 1905, Bamford joined the Royal Marine Light Infantry and served at various times in HMS Bulwark, Magnificent, Britannia, Chester, Royal Sovereign, and Highflyer.

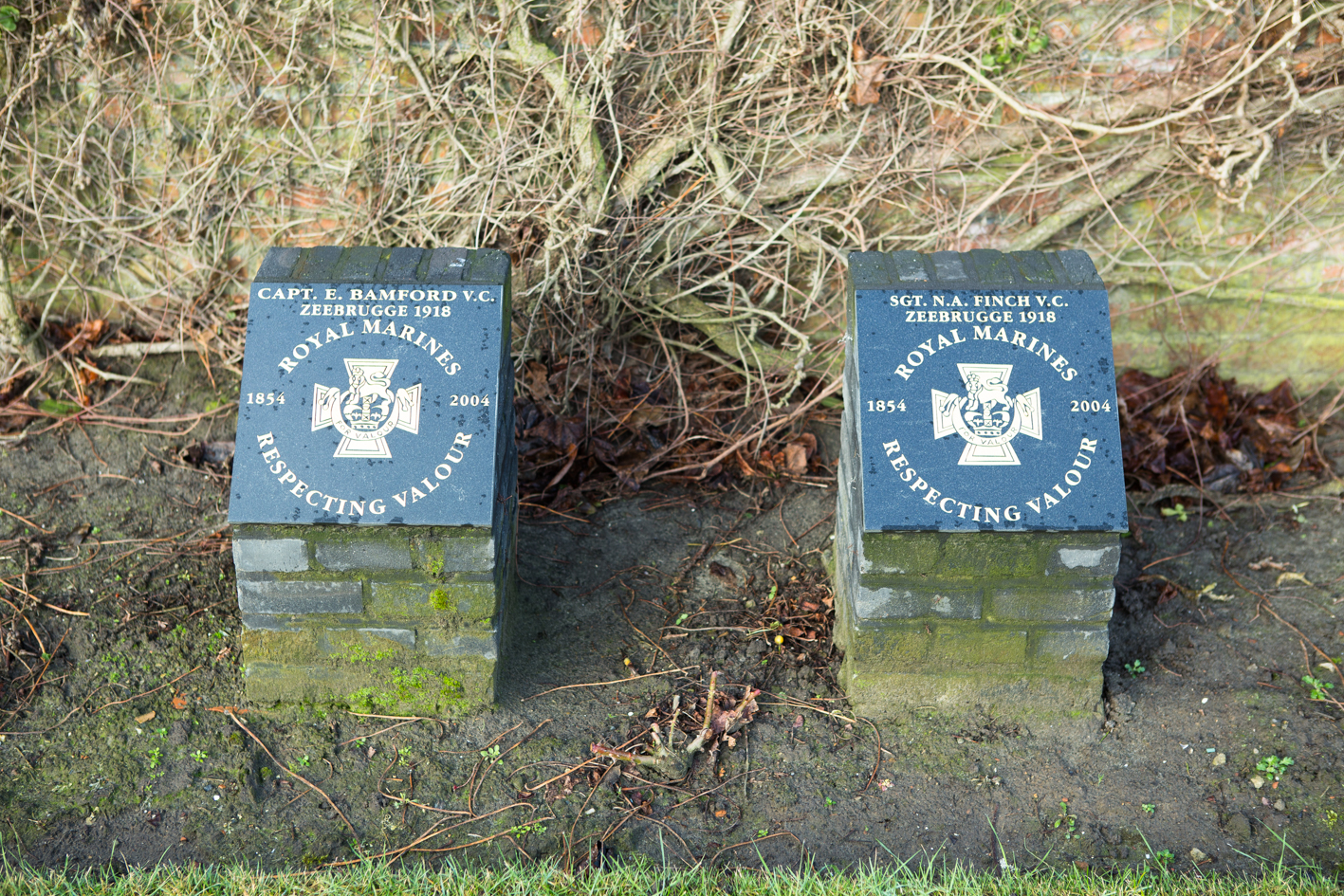
Memorial to Bamford and Norman Augustus Finch in Zeebrugge Churchyard

Bamford was 30 years old, and a captain in the Royal Marine Light Infantry during the First World War, when the following deed took place for which he was awarded the Victoria Cross (VC).

Captain Edward Bamford's Victoria Cross citation was published in the London Gazette, 23 July 1918:

For conspicuous gallantry at Zeebrugge, April 1918. This officer landed on the Mole from "Vindictive" with Nos. 5, 7 & 8 platoons of the Marine Storming Force in the face of great difficulties. When on the Mole under heavy fire, he displayed the greatest initiative in the command of his company, and by his total disregard of danger, showed a magnificent example to his men. He first established a strong point on the right of the disembarkation, and when that was safe, led an assault on a battery to the left with the utmost coolness and valour. Captain Bamford was selected by the officers of the R.M.A & R.M.L.I detachments to receive the Victoria Cross under Rule 13 of the Royal Warrant, dated 26 January 1856.

As with several First World War actions where so many officers and ranks distinguished themselves, such as "The Six VCs Before Breakfast" won by the Lancashire Fusiliers at Gallipoli, the Royal Marines Zeebrugge VCs were awarded by ballot, whereby those involved in the action voted for whom they deemed to merit the award.

Apart from the Victoria Cross and Distinguished Service Order, Bamford also received the Russian Order of Saint Anna, 3rd Class with Swords on 5 June 1917, the French Legion of Honour on 23 May 1919, the Japanese Order of the Rising Sun, 4th Class in August 1921, the 1914/15 Star, British War Medal and Victory Medal. He later achieved the rank of major.

== Death and legacy ==
Bamford died of pneumonia on 30 September 1928 aboard HMS Cumberland en route to Hong Kong, where he held the appointment of Instructor of Small Arms and Musketry Officer at Hong Kong. A 1930s photograph in the RM Museum shows a picture of his grave and headstone. All remaining cemeteries containing "foreigners" were destroyed in the Cultural Revolution. Bubbling Well Road Cemetery is now Jing'an Park.

Memorials to Bamford are in the Depot Church in Deal and there is a Bamford House in the RM Barrack at Eastney. On 3 April 2004, the Royal Marines presented a plaque in his memory to the Officials of Zeebrugge. His Victoria Cross is displayed at the Royal Marines Museum in Southsea, England.

An obituary for Bamford in The Shirburnian, the Sherborne School magazine, in December 1928 noted: "He won his V.C. as a leader of the landing party from the Vindictive on the Zeebrugge Mole on St. George's Day, 1918, and he will always be remembered as one of the outstanding heroes of that most gallant adventure ... In him Sherborne mourns one of her most distinguished sons."
