= HMS Phoebe (1916) =

Admiralty M-class destroyer

History

United Kingdom
- Name: Phoebe
- Namesake: Phoebe
- Builder: Fairfield Shipbuilding and Engineering Company, Govan
- Launched: 20 November 1916
- Commissioned: December 1916
- Fate: Sold for scrap, November 1921

General characteristics
- Class & type: Admiralty M-class destroyer
- Displacement: 971 long tons (987 t) (normal)
- Length: 273 ft 4 in (83.3 m) o/a
- Beam: 26 ft 8 in (8.1 m)
- Draught: 9 ft 8 in (2.9 m) (deep load)
- Installed power: 4 × Yarrow boilers; 25,000 shp (19,000 kW)
- Propulsion: 3 Shafts; 1 steam turbine
- Speed: 34 knots (63 km/h; 39 mph)
- Range: 2,100 nmi (3,900 km; 2,400 mi) at 15 knots (28 km/h; 17 mph)
- Complement: 76
- Armament: 3 × single 4 in (102 mm) guns; 2 × single 2 pdr (40 mm (1.6 in)) AA guns; 2 × twin 21 in (533 mm) torpedo tubes

HMS Phoebe was an Admiralty M-class destroyer built for the Royal Navy during the First World War. She took part in the Zeebrugge Raid in 1918 and was sold for scrap in 1921.

== Description ==
The Admiralty M class were improved and faster versions of the preceding Laforey-class destroyer. They displaced 972 long tons (988 t) at normal load. The ships had an overall length of 273 feet 4 inches (83.3 m), a beam of 26 feet 8 inches (8.1 m) and a deep draught of 9 feet 8 inches (2.9 m). Phoebe was powered by a single Parsons direct-drive steam turbine that drove three propeller shafts using steam provided by three Yarrow boilers. The turbines developed a total of 25,000 shaft horsepower (19,000 kW) and gave a maximum speed of 34 knots (63 km/h; 39 mph). The ships carried a maximum of 228 long tons (232 t) of fuel oil that gave them a range of 2,100 nautical miles (3,900 km; 2,400 mi) at 15 knots (28 km/h; 17 mph). The ships' complement was 76 officers and ratings.

The Admiralty Ms were armed with three single QF 4-inch (102 mm) Mark IV guns. One gun was positioned on the forecastle, the second was between the centre and aft funnels and the third at the stern. They were equipped with a pair of QF 2-pounder (40 mm (1.6 in)) "pom-pom" anti-aircraft guns, one on each broadside abreast the bridge. They were also fitted with two rotating twin mounts for 21-inch (533 mm) torpedoes amidships.

== Construction and service ==
Phoebe was ordered under the Fifth War Programme in February 1915 and built by Fairfield Shipbuilding & Engineering Company at Govan. The ship was launched on 20 November 1916 and completed in December 1916. She escorted H.M.S Vindictive at the Zeebrugge Raid on 23 April 1918.and attempted to rescue HMS North Star before taking off here crew . The ship was sold for breaking up in November 1921.

== Bibliography ==
- Colledge, J. J.; Warlow, Ben (2006) [1969]. Ships of the Royal Navy: The Complete Record of All Fighting Ships of the Royal Navy from the 15th Century to the Present (3rd Rev ed.). London: Chatham Publishing. ISBN 978-1-86176-281-8. OCLC 67375475.
- Dittmar, F.J. & Colledge, J.J. (1972). British Warships 1914–1919. Shepperton, UK: Ian Allan. ISBN 0-7110-0380-7.
- Friedman, Norman (2009). British Destroyers: From Earliest Days to the Second World War. Barnsley, UK: Seaforth Publishing. ISBN 978-1-84832-049-9.
- Gardiner, Robert & Gray, Randal (1985). Conway's All The World's Fighting Ships 1906–1921. London: Conway Maritime Press. ISBN 0-85177-245-5.
- Keyes, Roger (1 March 2013). "31189: 18 February 1919, Zeebrugge and Ostend Raids, Naval Despatch dated 9 May 1918". www.naval-history.net.
- March, Edgar J. (1966). British Destroyers: A History of Development, 1892–1953; Drawn by Admiralty Permission From Official Records & Returns, Ships' Covers & Building Plans. London: Seeley Service. OCLC 164893555.
