= HMS G11 =

British submarine

Coordinates: 55.452°N 1.589°W

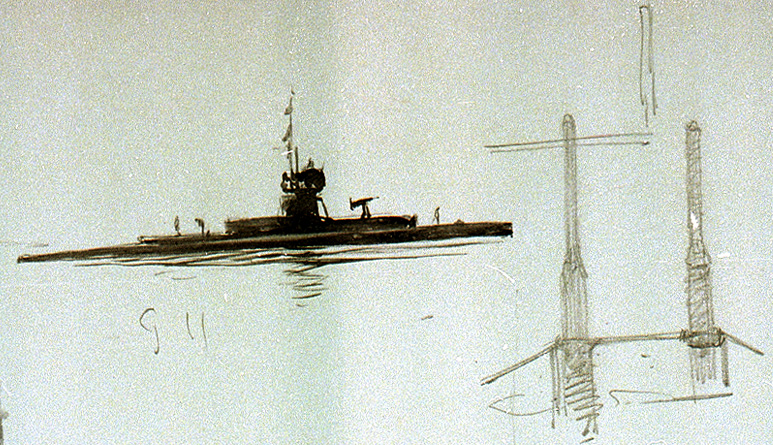
- G11 submarine before bow modification by William Lionel Wyllie

History

United Kingdom
- Name: G11
- Builder: Vickers, Barrow in Furness
- Laid down: 28 March 1915
- Launched: 22 February 1916
- Commissioned: 13 May 1916
- Fate: Wrecked off Howick, Northumberland, 22 November 1918 NU261176

General characteristics
- Class & type: G-class submarine
- Displacement: 703 long tons (714 t) (surfaced); 837 long tons (850 t) (submerged)
- Length: 188 ft 8 in (57.51 m)
- Beam: 22 ft 8 in (6.91 m)
- Draught: 13 ft 7 in (4.14 m)
- Installed power: 1,600 bhp (1,200 kW) (diesel); 840 hp (630 kW) (electric motor)
- Propulsion: 2 × diesel engines; 2 × electric motors; 2 × shafts
- Speed: 14.5 kn (16.7 mph; 26.9 km/h) (surfaced); 10 kn (12 mph; 19 km/h) (submerged)
- Range: 3,160 nmi (3,640 mi; 5,850 km) at 10 kn (12 mph; 19 km/h) (surfaced); 95 nmi (109 mi; 176 km) at 3 kn (3.5 mph; 5.6 km/h) (submerged)
- Capacity: 44.14 long tons (44.85 t) diesel fuel
- Complement: 31
- Armament: 1 × 3 in (76 mm) gun, 1 × 12-pounder gun, 4 × 18-inch (450-mm) torpedo tubes (2 bow, 2 beam), 1 × stern 21 inch torpedo tube (10 torpedoes, all tubes combined)

HMS G11 was a G-class submarine of the Royal Navy in service during the First World War. One of six of her class built by Vickers at Barrow in Furness, she was launched on 22 February 1916, and commissioned on 13 May 1916.

== Description ==
The G-class submarines were designed by the Admiralty in response to a rumour that the Germans were building double-hulled submarines for overseas duties. The G-class had a length of 187 feet 1 inch (57.0 m) overall, a beam of 22 feet 8 inches (6.9 m) and a mean draught of 13 feet 4 inches (4.1 m). They displaced 703 long tons (714 t) on the surface and 837 long tons (850 t) submerged. The G-class submarines had a crew of 30 officers and ratings. They had a partial double hull.

For surface running, the boats were powered by two 800-brake-horsepower (597 kW) Vickers two-stroke diesel engines, each driving one propeller shaft. When submerged each propeller was driven by a 420-horsepower (313 kW) electric motor. They could reach 14.25 knots (26.39 km/h; 16.40 mph) on the surface and 9 knots (17 km/h; 10 mph) underwater. On the surface, the G class had a range of 2,400 nautical miles (4,400 km; 2,800 mi) at 16 knots (30 km/h; 18 mph).

The boats were intended to be armed with one 21-inch (53.3 cm) torpedo tube in the bow and two 18-inch (45 cm) torpedo tubes on the beam. This was revised, however, while they were under construction, the 21-inch tube was moved to the stern and two additional 18-inch tubes were added in the bow. They carried two 21-inch and eight 18-inch torpedoes. The G-class submarines were also armed with a single 3-inch (7.6 cm) deck gun.

== War service ==
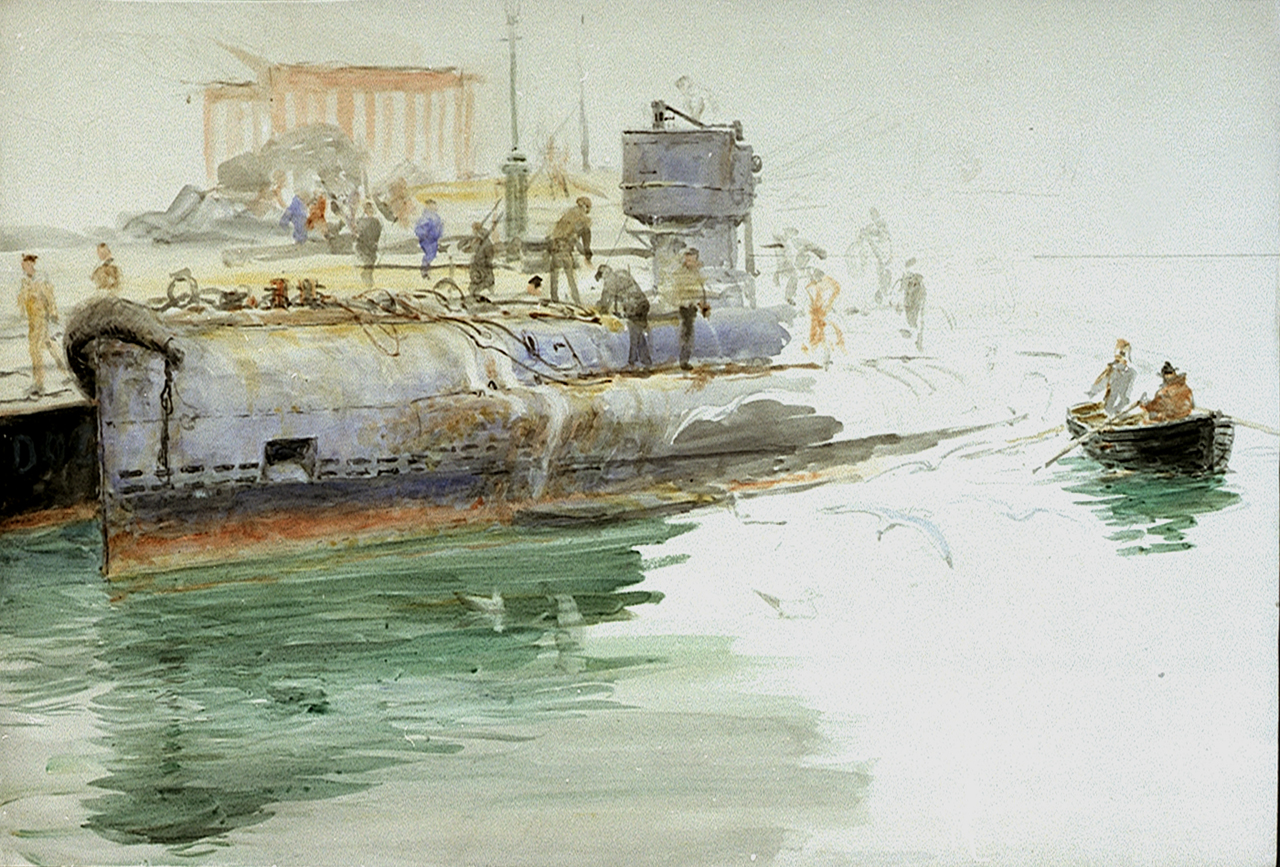
A possible study of the G11 at a quayside by Wyllie

Like the rest of her class, G11's role was to patrol an area of the North Sea in search of German U-boats.

== Loss ==
On 22 November 1918, whilst under the temporary command of Lieutenant Commander George Fagan Bradshaw, G11 was returning to her base at Blyth, Northumberland, from Dogger Bank patrol following the Armistice. Sailing through dense fog, she overshot Blyth and ran aground on rocks below cliffs near Howick, some 30 mi (48 km) to the north. The boat's log had been disabled earlier and Bradshaw underestimated her speed in the inclement weather, with the result that the boat had travelled substantially further than he had reckoned. The impact tore the keel off and the boat was abandoned, two of her crew drowning during the evacuation.

G11's regular captain Lieutenant Richard Douglas Sandford VC had not sailed on her last mission, having succumbed to typhoid fever. He died at Eston hospital the day after learning his ship had been lost.
