= HMS Thetis (1890) =

Apollo-class cruiser

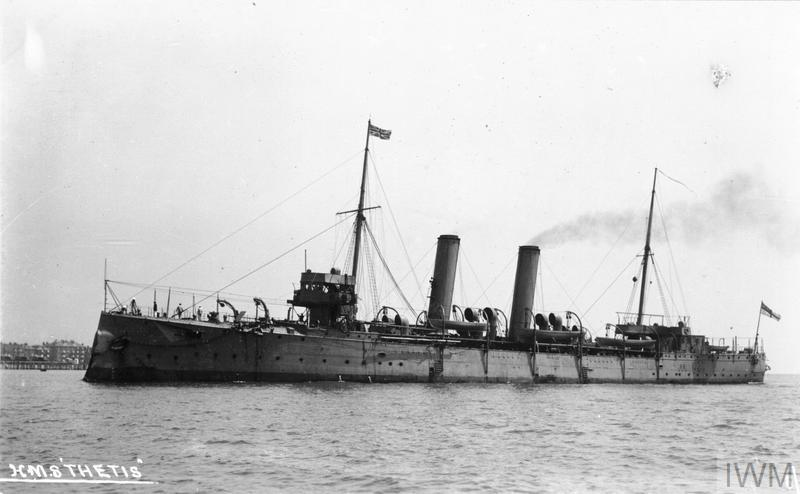
- Protected cruiser HMS Thetis

History

United Kingdom
- Name: HMS Thetis
- Builder: J & G Thomson, Clydebank
- Laid down: 29 October 1889
- Launched: 13 December 1890
- Commissioned: April 1892
- Fate: Deliberately sunk in the Zeebrugge Raid on 23 April 1918

General characteristics
- Class & type: Apollo-class 2nd class protected cruiser
- Displacement: 3,400 tons
- Length: 314 ft (95.7 m)
- Beam: 43 ft (13.1 m)
- Draught: 17.5 ft (5.3 m)
- Propulsion: Twin triple-expansion coal-fired steam engines, 7,000 indicated hp (5 MW), twin screws
- Speed: 18.5 knots (34 km/h) maximum
- Complement: 273 to 300 (Officers and Men)
- Armament: As built: 2 × QF 6-inch (152.4 mm) guns; 6 (later 4) × QF 4.7-inch (120 mm) guns; 8 × 6-pounder (3 kg) Hotchkiss; 1 × 3-pounder Vickers; 4 × Maxim machine guns; 4 × 14 inch torpedo tubes; 100 mines; Converted pre-1914 to a lightly armed minelayer.
- Armour: 1.3 to 2 in (33 to 51 mm) deck, no belt

HMS Thetis was an Apollo-class second-class protected cruiser of the Royal Navy, launched on 13 December 1890. Her first significant mission was service in the Bering Sea Patrol with American warships in a combined effort to suppress poaching in the Bering Sea.

Thetis early in her career

She served on the Mediterranean Station until relieved in March 1901. She was paid off at Chatham in early June 1901, and was placed in the Fleet reserve. She was commissioned at Chatham on 25 November 1902 with a complement of 273 officers and men for service on the China Station. She left Sheerness on 14 December, stopping in Gibraltar, Malta, Port Said, Aden, Colombo and more places before arriving in Shanghai in early February the following year.

The latter half of her career was spent as a mine-layer. Laden with concrete, she was deliberately sunk at 51°21′28.66″N 3°11′50.64″E as a blockship in attempt to block the canal in the Zeebrugge Raid during the First World War, on 23 April 1918.

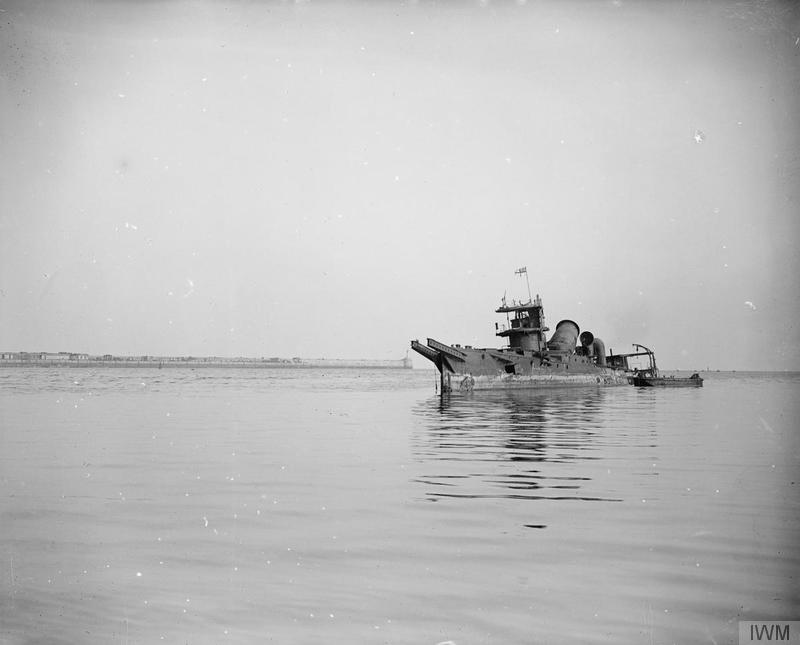
The White Ensign flying on wreck of the Thetis in the harbour at Zeebrugge outside the mouth of the ship canal, 24 October 1918

Post-war, Thetis was beached on a sandbank west of the harbour entrance. The wreck was cleared in 1957.

== Publications ==
Colledge, J. J.; Warlow, Ben (2006) [1969]. Ships of the Royal Navy: The Complete Record of All Fighting Ships of the Royal Navy from the 15th Century to the Present (3rd Rev ed.). London: Chatham Publishing. ISBN 978-1-86176-281-8. OCLC 67375475.
