= Garth (name) =

A garth is an enclosed quadrangle or yard, especially one surrounded by a cloister (Middle English; Old Norse garþr, garðr; akin to Anglo-Saxon geard). This led to the word being given as a last name to people who worked in or near a garden. Later it came to be used as a first name.

It is also possible that the name Garth comes from Gareth [ˈɡarɛθ], a Welsh masculine given name of uncertain meaning. It first appeared in this form in Thomas Malory's Le Morte d'Arthur, in which it belonged to Sir Gareth, a brother of Gawain and one of the Knights of the Round Table. Malory based it on Gahariet, a name found in French Arthurian texts; it may have a Welsh origin, perhaps connected with the name Geraint, or the word gwaredd, meaning "gentleness". It is particularly popular in Wales, and Gary is sometimes taken as a pet form of it.

== Given name ==
- Garth Ancier (born 1957), American television network executive
- Garth Brooks (born 1962), top-selling American country music artist
- Garth Christian, English nature writer
- Garth Crooks (born 1958), former Stoke City and Tottenham Hotspur footballer
- Garth Drabinsky (born 1949), former Canadian film and theatrical producer and entrepreneur
- Garth Ennis (born 1970), Irish comics writer
- Garth Everett (1954–2023), American attorney and lawyer
- Garth Fagan (born 1940), Jamaican choreographer
- Garth Hound, San Francisco based electronic musician
- Garth Hudson (1937–2025), Canadian multi-instrumentalist, organist for rock group The Band
- Garth Jennings (born 1972), film director in "Hammer & Tongs" team
- Garth Matthams, Canadian writer of Witch Creek Road (2017–2021) and Witch Creek High (2023; on hiatus)
- Garth Nix (born 1963), Australian fantasy author
- Garth Norman (1938–2023), British clergyman
- Garth Richardson (born 1960), Canadian music producer
- Garth Saloner (born c. 1955), South African-born American economist
- Garth Snow (born 1969), American ice hockey goaltender
- Garth Tander (born 1977), Australian racing driver
- Hon. Garth Turner (born 1949), Canadian MP for Halton (1988–1993 and 2006–2008)
- Garth Welch (1936–2025), Australian dancer and choreographer
- Garth Wilkin, politician from Saint Kitts and Nevis
- Garth Williams (1912–1996), American children's book illustrator

== Fictional characters ==
- Garth, an anthropomorphic wolf from the animated film series Alpha and Omega
- Garth, a DC Comics superhero also known as Aqualad and Tempest
- Garth, the Hero of Will from the video game series Fable
- Garth, hero of long-running 1970s British newspaper strip of the same name drawn by Frank Bellamy and Martin Asbury
- Garth, in the Heritage of Shannara series by Terry Brooks
- Garth of Izar, a Fleet Captain in the Star Trek episode "Whom Gods Destroy"
- Garth family, farmers in the 19th century novel Middlemarch, A Study of Provincial Life
- Garth Algar, a main character from the skit and film series Wayne's World
- Judge Henry Garth, judicial character on the TV show The Virginian
- Garth Fitzgerald IV, from the series Supernatural
- Garth Marenghi, a fictional horror author
- Garth Ranzz, a DC Comics character also known as Lightning Lad or Live Wire
- Garth Stubbs, nicknamed "Garthy", a character in British sitcom Birds of a Feather
- Garth Volbeck, a character in Ferris Bueller’s Day Off

== Surname ==
- Brian Garth (born 1979), American singer, songwriter, guitarist, musician, sound engineer and producer, co-creator of Black Camaro
- Charles Garth (c. 1734–1784), British Member of Parliament, British Crown Agent for South Carolina, Georgia and briefly Maryland
- Jennie Garth (born 1972), American Beverly Hills, 90210 actress
- Jimmy Garth (1922–1972), Scottish footballer
- John Garth (1701–1764), British politician
- John Garth (composer) (1721–1810), English composer
- John S. Garth (1909–1993), American naturalist
- Kim Garth (born 1996), Irish women's cricketer
- Lakita Garth, African-American advocate of sexual abstinence, public speaker and author
- Leonard I. Garth (1921–2016), American judge
- Richard Garth (1820–1903), Chief Justice of Bengal and Privy Counsellor
- Samuel Garth (1661–1719), British physician
- Thomas Garth (British Army officer) (1744–1829), British Army general, chief equerry to George III
- Thomas Garth (Royal Navy) (died 1841), British Royal Navy captain
