= Victor Crutchley =

Royal Navy Admiral (1893–1986)

Admiral Sir Victor Crutchley VC KCB DSC DL
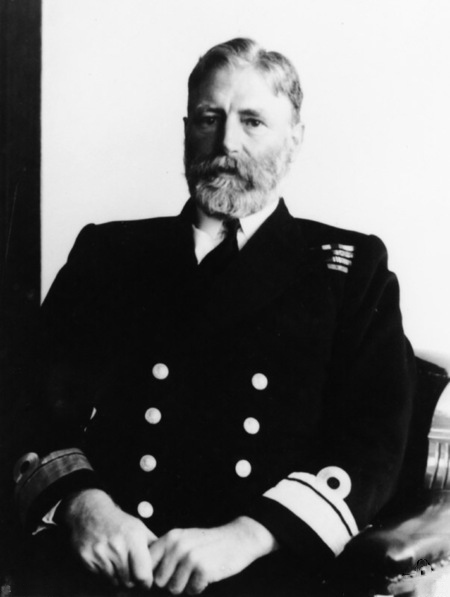
- Victor Crutchley in 1942
- Born: 2 November 1893; Chelsea, London
- Died: 24 January 1986 (aged 92); Nettlecombe, Dorset
- Burial place: St Mary's Churchyard, Powerstock
- Military career
- Allegiance: United Kingdom
- Branch: Royal Navy
- Service years: 1906–1947
- Rank: Admiral
- Commands: Royal Navy Dockyard, Gibraltar (1945–47); HM Australian Squadron (1942–44); HMNB Devonport (1940–42); HMS Warspite (1937–40); Fishery Protection and Mine-Sweeping Flotilla (1936–37); HMS Diomede (1930–32)
- Conflicts: First World War; Second World War
- Awards: Victoria Cross; Knight Commander of the Order of the Bath; Distinguished Service Cross; Mentioned in Despatches; Croix de guerre (France); Chief Commander of the Legion of Merit (United States); Order of Polonia Restituta (Poland)

Admiral Sir Victor Alexander Charles Crutchley VC, KCB, DSC, DL (2 November 1893 – 24 January 1986) was a British naval officer.

He was a First World War recipient of the Victoria Cross, the highest award for gallantry in the face of the enemy that can be awarded to British and Commonwealth forces, and a senior Royal Navy officer during the Second World War.

== Early life and education ==
Crutchley was born on 2 November 1893 at 28 Lennox Gardens, Chelsea, London, the only son of Percy Edward (1855–1940) and the Hon. Frederica Louisa (1864–1932), second daughter of Charles FitzRoy, 3rd Baron Southampton. His mother had been maid of honour to Queen Victoria. He was a godchild of Queen Victoria (from whom he derived his first two names). He joined the navy in 1906 and was educated at the Royal Naval College, Osborne and Royal Naval College, Dartmouth.

== First World War ==
In September 1915 Crutchley was promoted to lieutenant and posted to a battleship of the Grand Fleet, HMS Centurion. Centurion participated in the Battle of Jutland. After the battle Captain Roger Keyes assumed command of Centurion and acquired a highly favorable impression of Crutchley. Keyes selected Crutchley for the Zeebrugge Raid of 23 April 1918; he was assigned by Keyes as first lieutenant to Commander Alfred Godsal, also of Centurion, on the obsolete cruiser Brilliant.

Brilliant and Sirius were to be sunk as blockships at Ostend. The Germans had moved a navigation buoy, and so the ships were beached in the wrong place under heavy fire. But Crutchley performed well and was awarded the Distinguished Service Cross.

Crutchley volunteered for the Second Ostend Raid on 9 May, and was posted to the cruiser Vindictive, again commanded by Godsal. When Godsal was killed and the navigating officer incapacitated, Crutchley took command. When a propeller was damaged on the quay, preventing the vessel fully closing the canal, Crutchley ordered its scuttling and personally oversaw the evacuation under fire.

Crutchley transferred to the damaged motor launch ML 254. When its wounded captain Lieutenant Geoffrey Drummond collapsed, Crutchley took command. Crutchley oversaw bailing operations, standing in water up to his waist, until the destroyer HMS Warwick, carrying Admiral Keyes, came to its aid.

Although the second raid also failed fully to close the Bruges Canal to submarine traffic, Crutchley, Drummond and Rowland Bourke were awarded Victoria Crosses for the action. When there were more worthy recipients than VCs to award, the men were allowed to elect those to receive a VC. Crutchley was one of the last elected VCs. During the final months of the war, Crutchley served on HMS Sikh in the Dover Patrol, the Channel force commanded by Keyes.

== Inter-war ==
In 1920, Crutchley spent a tour of duty on board the minesweeper HMS Petersfield on the South American and South Atlantic station. He then served on the royal yacht Alexandra in 1921, the cadet-training dreadnought Thunderer in 1922–1924, and the royal yacht Victoria and Albert in 1924.

In 1924 he went to the Mediterranean Fleet for four years, serving under Roger Keyes, now Commander-in-Chief at Malta. Crutchley was on HMS Queen Elizabeth in 1924–1926, and then on the light cruiser HMS Ceres in 1926–1928.

Crutchley was a polo player, and was invited to play for Keyes' polo team, the Centurions. At one point in 1927, Crutchley played on the same team as Keyes, the Duke of York, and Louis Mountbatten. Crutchley was promoted to commander in 1928. In 1930, he married Joan Elisabeth Loveday of Pentillie Castle, Cornwall, the sister of Air Chief Marshal Alec Coryton.

In August 1930, Crutchley joined HMS Diomede in the New Zealand Division of the Royal Navy where he served until 1933. Serving as executive officer, Crutchley was present at the relief operation after the 1931 Hawke's Bay earthquake, and towards the end of his tour, when the captain was chronically ill, took command of Diomede until he was promoted to captain. He was posted home in 1933. Crutchley was senior officer, 1st Minesweeper Flotilla (1st MSF) from 1935 to 1936 aboard the minesweeper HMS Halcyon at Portland, Dorset. In November 1935 Crutchley took the 1st MSF to join the Mediterranean Fleet in Alexandria, and cruised to Famagusta, Cyprus for 10 days during the winter. On 16 April 1936, Crutchley was relieved by Captain W. P. C. Manwaring and appointed Captain, Fishery Protection and Minesweeping with overall command over the Royal Navy's Minesweeping and armed trawler fleet.

On 1 May 1937, Crutchley took command of HMS Warspite, which had been completely refitted in three years at Portsmouth. Due to acceptance trials Warspite was not present at the Coronation Fleet Review of King George VI. Additional engineering work on the steering gear (which still suffered from damage taken at Jutland) and other equipment resulted in weekend leaves for the crew being curtailed, leading to very low morale. Comments appeared in British newspapers, which culminated in an anonymous letter from a crew member. This provoked an inquiry by the Admiralty. The inquiry led to the removal of three of Crutchley's officers, including his executive officer. Crutchley disagreed with the findings of the Inquiry and made sure that the confidential report on his executive officer would lead to a promotion to captain.

Warspite eventually proceeded to the Mediterranean Fleet to serve as the flagship of Admiral Dudley Pound, Commander-in-Chief. Crutchley served as Flag Captain to first Pound and then to Admiral Andrew Cunningham up to the outbreak of war.

== Second World War ==
=== North Sea ===
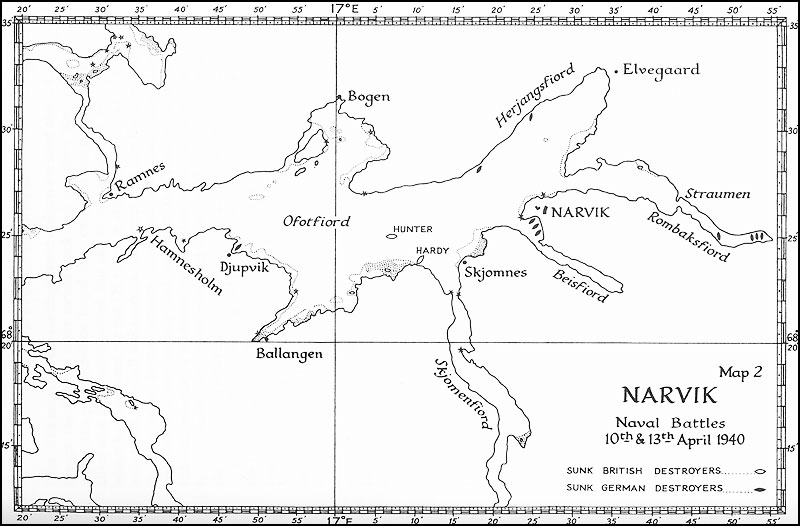
Map of Narvik and its environs.

After the outbreak of war in September 1939, Warspite was assigned to the Home Fleet. Due to the lack of anti-submarine precautions at the North Sea naval bases, it was some time before she reached Scapa Flow, the main fleet anchorage. Until the start of the Norwegian campaign on 9 April 1940, action had been severely limited by the U-boat threat. A significant German naval presence in the North Sea saw the Home Fleet off the coast of Norway. The inconclusive first battle of Narvik was on 10 April.

On 13 April, Crutchley commanded Warspite in the second battle of Narvik. She accompanied nine destroyers into Ofotfjord, where eight German destroyers were sunk or scuttled. Warspite's catapult plane even sank a U-boat.

After this action, Crutchley was appointed commodore of Royal Naval Barracks, Devonport, overseeing the preparation of crews for assignment to ships. While there he was greeted by a detachment of sailors who had served on Warspite at Narvik:

A very surprised and delighted Commodore came over to his old 'Shipmates' and shook every one by the hand. In the conversation he disclosed that he had been given a shore job as Commodore, Plymouth and he was not a happy man.

=== South West Pacific Area ===
After the opening of hostilities with Japan, Crutchley was promoted to rear admiral and lent to the Royal Australian Navy for service in the South West Pacific Area. On 13 June 1942 Crutchley succeeded Rear Admiral John Crace in command of Task Force 44, the Australian Squadron, based in Brisbane, the last Briton to do so.

==== Battle of Savo Island ====
During the landings on Guadalcanal, on 7 August 1942, Crutchley served as Commander Task Group 62.2 (CTG 62.2), the covering group, with his flag in HMAS Australia. TG 62.2 included three Australian and five American cruisers, fifteen destroyers, and some minesweepers. He was under Admiral Richmond K. Turner of the United States Navy, commander of the amphibious force. TG 62.2 was on constant alert, rendering support to the landings or fending off Japanese air attacks.

On 8 August, Vice Admiral Frank Jack Fletcher withdrew the aircraft carriers that had provided air cover. Turner decided the amphibious force must also leave the next day. He summoned Crutchley and Major General Alexander Vandegrift (commander of the troops on Guadalcanal) to an evening conference on his flagship. Crutchley took Australia to the amphibious anchorage, leaving five cruisers and six destroyers on guard to the west.

That night a powerful Japanese cruiser force attacked. They caught Task Group 62.2 by surprise, and sank four Allied cruisers, including HMAS Canberra. In the wake of the disaster, Crutchley was heavily criticised, both for leaving his command, and for an ineffective deployment which allowed the Japanese to get close without being detected by radar.

Crutchley nonetheless retained the confidence of his superiors. He remained with the RAN in the South West Pacific, commanding TF 44 (redesignated TF 74 in 1943) for another 23 months. His command of the Australian Squadron ended on 13 June 1944.

In September 1944, Crutchley received the American Legion of Merit in the degree of Chief Commander.

== Later years ==
Crutchley's final command was Flag Officer Gibraltar after the war (14 January 1945 - January 1947). He retired in 1947 and was promoted to admiral in 1949.

Crutchley enjoyed a long retirement at Mappercombe Manor, near Bridport in Dorset. In 1955, he was appointed High Sheriff of Dorset and in 1957, Deputy Lieutenant for Dorset. When he died in 1986 at the age of 92, he was one of the last surviving admirals from World War II. In 1945, Crutchley had bought two paintings (Capriccio: The Lagoon, Venice and La Torre di Marghera) by the landscape artist Bernardo Bellotto. They were given to the nation in lieu of tax and presented to the Bristol City Museum and Art Gallery in 1988. (Note: The two paintings have incomplete provenance for the period 1933–1945.)

== Notes ==
Military offices
Preceded by Rear Admiral John Crace	Rear Admiral Commanding HM Australian Squadron; 1942–1944	Succeeded by Commodore John Collins
