= Alfred Godsal =

- Born: 2 December 1884; Sturminster Marshall, Dorset, England
- Died: 10 May 1918 (aged 33); Ostend, Belgium
- Burial place: Oostende New Communal Cemetery
- Relatives: Philip Thomas Godsal (father); Wilfred Parke (cousin)
- Military career
- Allegiance: United Kingdom
- Branch: Royal Navy
- Service years: 1899–1918
- Rank: Commander
- Commands: HMS Vindictive; HMS Brilliant
- Conflicts: First World War; Battle of Jutland; First Ostend Raid; Second Ostend Raid
- Awards: Distinguished Service Order; Mentioned in Despatches; Croix de Guerre (France)

Alfred Edmund Godsal DSO (2 December 1884 – 10 May 1918) was a British officer of the Royal Navy who commanded HMS Brilliant in the First Ostend Raid on 23 April 1918. In the early hours of 10 May 1918 he was killed in action commanding HMS Vindictive during the Second Ostend Raid. This event is marked each year in Ostend as Vindictive Day.

== Early life and family ==
Godsal was born at Henbury House, Sturminster Marshall, Dorset, on 2 December 1884, the son of Philip Thomas Godsal, of Iscoyd Park, Flintshire, and Ellen Henrietta Parke. His mother's family were land owners in Sturminster Marshall. Two of Alfred Godsal's siblings, Major Walter Hugh Godsal of the Durham Light Infantry and Margaret Louisa Godsal, also died in the 15 months which preceded his own death.

Godsal was a cousin of Wilfred Parke, an early naval aviator who was the first pilot to make an observed recovery from a spin and who was killed in 1912.

== Naval career ==
After attending AJ de Winton's school in Slough, Alfred Godsal joined HMS Britannia Royal Naval College at Dartmouth in September 1899 as a naval cadet. Between 1901 and 1904, Godsal served as a midshipman, firstly aboard HMS Hannibal from January 1901, and then in HMS Irresistible, where he gained five first-class certificates in his exams prior to being commissioned as a sub-lieutenant. He then became a "Five Wonner", having the rare distinction of achieving first class passes in seamanship, navigation, gunnery, torpedoes, and signals.

After short appointments, including HMS Foam, HMS Griffon and HMS Hogue, Godsal joined HMS Vernon in 1907 to qualify as a specialist torpedo officer. This was followed by the advanced torpedo course which included wireless telegraphy. After several torpedo-related jobs, in 1910–12 he joined HMS Monmouth on the China Station. While there he was loaned for a time to the Yangtze River gunboat Kinsha, including a brief period in command whilst awaiting the arrival of the new captain. HMS Kinsha, previously known as SS Pioneer, had belonged to Samuel Cornell Plant but was requisitioned by the British navy during the Boxer Rebellion.

In 1912 Godsal was appointed as torpedo officer of HMS Centurion in the 2nd Battle Squadron, which played a minor part in the Battle of Jutland. He was promoted to commander in June 1917 and continued in that ship until volunteering for the "special operation" of Zeebrugge/Ostend.

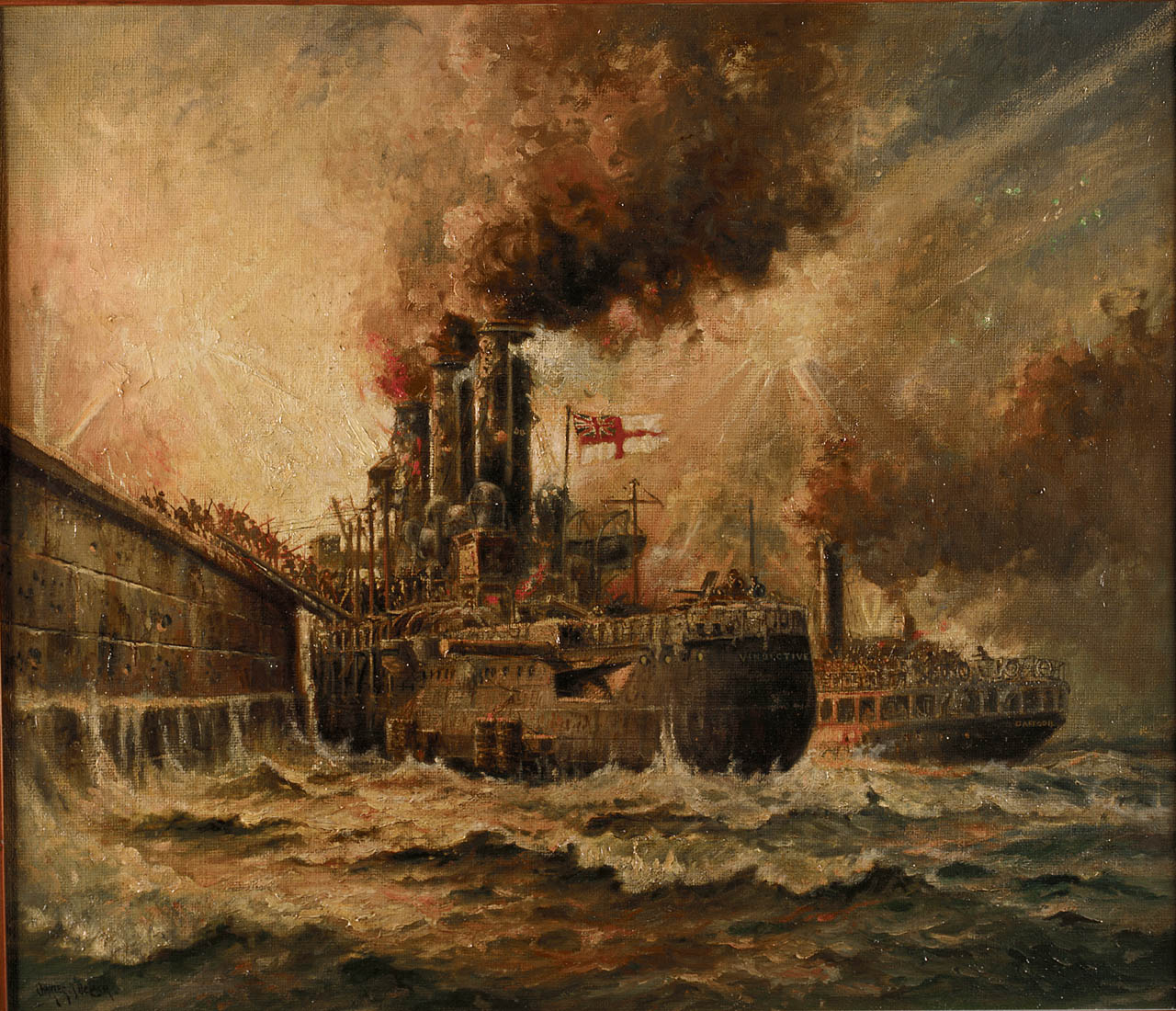
Charles John de Lacy – HMS 'Vindictive' at Zeebrugge, 23 April 1918

Godsal led the first attempt on Ostend whilst commanding HMS Brilliant and accompanied by HMS Sirius. This was unsuccessful when both ships, unable to find the harbour entrance, ran aground and had to be abandoned. He was slightly wounded.

With the apparently successful blocking of the Zeebrugge-Bruges canal, the Ostend canal became increasingly significant. Several officers, led by Godsal and his first lieutenant, Victor Crutchley, urged Admiral Roger Keyes to allow a second attack. HMS Vindictive, the ship selected to block the canal entrance, was manned entirely by volunteers, mostly drawn from HMS Brilliant and HMS Sirius. Godsal was again in command and was killed in the attack.
