= Ostend Raid =

Ostend Raid may refer to:

- Ostend Raid (1798), combined Royal Navy British Army attack to disrupt French invasion preparations
- First Ostend Raid (23 April 1918), the first of two attacks by the Royal Navy on the German-held port of Ostend during the First World War
- Second Ostend Raid (9 May 1918), the second of two attacks by the Royal Navy on the German-held port of Ostend during the First World War
