= Thomas Garth =

Thomas Garth may refer to:

- Thomas Garth (British Army officer) (1744–1829)
- Thomas Garth (Royal Navy) (1787–1841)
- Thomas Garth (MP) for Bletchingley (UK Parliament constituency)
