= Philip Thomas Godsal =

High Sheriff of Flintshire (1850–1925)

Major Philip Thomas Godsal (1850–1925), was a Welsh soldier, landowner, marksman, historian and inventor of a gun mechanism.

He was born at Plas Fron, Wrexham, Denbighshire in 1850, the son of Philip William Godsal, of Iscoyd Park, Flintshire, and Charlotte Harriet Garth. He was the grandson of Thomas Garth RN a Napoleonic era naval commander and a great grandson of William Best, 1st Baron Wynford. His children included Commander Alfred Godsal who was killed commanding HMS Vindictive during the Second Ostend Raid on May 9, 1918.

== Marksmanship ==
Godsal started his military career in 1869 with the 52nd Light Infantry in Malta and became Inspector of Musketry. He enjoyed a considerable career at Bisley Ranges, and was chosen to be part of the British team at various international matches including against America in 1882, where Britain won. By 1880 Godsal had left the army and became adjutant of the Eton College Volunteers and remained in this post until 1897. Godsal was a famous shot in his day, and his trophies included the Cambridge University Cup which he won after achieving a score of 418, unbroken until 1912 when he was surpassed by his own son. Between him and his son also called Philip Godsal the two of them were on the winning team competing for the Elcho Shield eight times.

== Rifle Design ==
Godsal's interests were however not limited to shooting, he was also interested in the design of guns, and during the 1880s when a small bore magazine rifle was sought to replace the Martini-Henry Godsal was one of those who submitted a prototype for trial. His submission was late and the authorities had already settled for the Lee-Metford. Godsal however, who had reservations about existing bolt action breech mechanisms, continued over the next twenty years to develop rifles based on a travelling block principle, although none of them including an anti-tank rifle developed in World War I were adopted by the military.

== Historical works ==
A keen historian Godsal was the author of several books, including The Storming of London and the Thames Valley Campaign a Military Study of the Conquest of Britain By the Angles. This book set out to prove that the Teutonic invaders of Britain had seized London after the Battle of Crayford before the Britons could prepare their defences and made control of the Thames waterway the main feature of their invasion. This work also hypothesized in part over why the English had chosen St George as their patron saint. Godsal suggested that after the defeat of the Norman Conquest the English, would have consoled themselves with memories of 'bygone days', in Old English, geogeara, and that the name of St George could have been confused with this echo of former glory.

Subsequent works included Woden's, Grim's and Offa's Dykes (1913) and Mona Badonicus, the battle of Bath (1914) Later in life Godsal also wrote The Conquests of Ceawlin, The second Bretwalda, where he charted the arrival of the West Saxons through to the fall of Ceawlin.

== Family ==
In 1879 Godsal married Ellen Henrietta Parke who was daughter of Charles Joseph Parke of Henbury, Dorset, and grand daughter of Charles Parke, formerly H.B.M. Commissioner to the Kingdom of Mexico and Deputy Lieutenant of Dorset. She was also a niece of General William Parke and an aunt of Lieutenant Wilfred Parke the first aviator to recover from an accidental spin, in 1912. They had 8 children including Commander Alfred Godsal, DSO RN who commanded HMS Vindictive (1897) at the Second Ostend Raid and was killed in the action in 1918. Two of their other children, Walter Hugh Godsal DSO, MC, (Durham Light Infantry) and Margaret Louisa Godsal, died during the First World War; those surviving included a daughter Dorothy Grace Godsal who married Major Richard Peacock Birchenough a nephew of Sir Henry Birchenough and grandson of Richard Peacock MP the locomotive manufacturer. His eldest son Captain Philip Godsal MC escaped from a prisoner of war camp in Germany during the war and made his way back safely to Britain and subsequently married Violet Mary Browning.

== Other ==
Godsal was a magistrate and was appointed High Sheriff of Flintshire in 1901.

== Books and pamphlets ==
- The Great Rifle Problem: How to Make a Breech Mechanism For Small Arms- Publisher Eton: R Ingelton Drake, London: Simpkin Marshall & Co 1890.
- The Storming of London and the Thames Valley Campaign a Military Study of the Conquest of Britain By the Angles - Publisher, Harrison & Sons. 1908
- Woden's, Grim's and Offa's Dykes 1913
- Mona Badonicus, the battle of Bath 1914
- Conquests of Ceawlin, The second Bretwalda- Publisher, John Murray, 1924
