= Arrogant-class cruiser =

Ship class

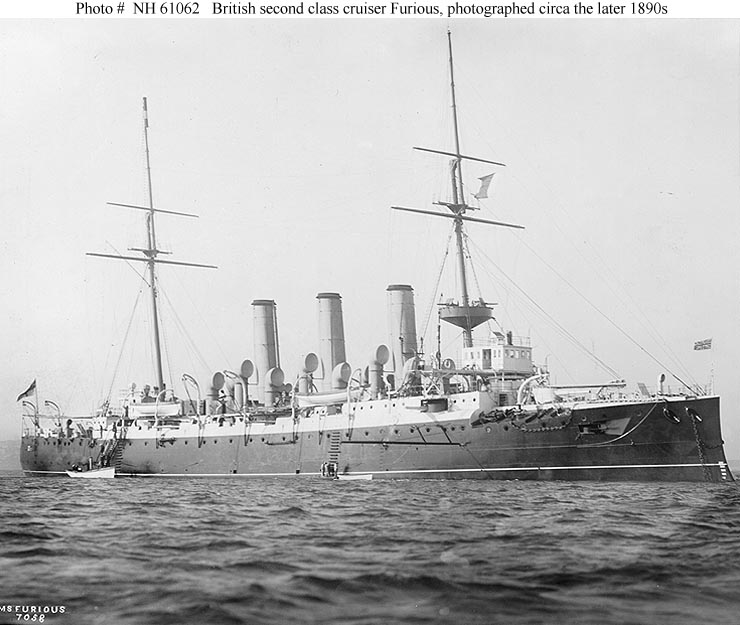
- HMS Furious

Class overview
- Operators: Royal Navy
- Preceded by: Eclipse class
- Succeeded by: Pelorus class
- Built: 1895–1900
- In service: 1898–1923
- Completed: 4
- Lost: 2
- Scrapped: 2

General characteristics
- Type: Protected cruiser
- Displacement: 5,750 long tons (5,842 t)
- Length: 320 ft (97.5 m) (p/p); 342 ft (104.2 m) (o/a)
- Beam: 57 ft 6 in (17.5 m)
- Draught: 20 ft (6.1 m)
- Installed power: 10,000 shp (7,460 kW)
- Propulsion: 2 shafts; 2 vertical triple-expansion steam engines; 18 Belleville water-tube boilers
- Speed: 19 knots (35.2 km/h; 21.9 mph)
- Complement: 480
- Armament: 4 × QF 6-inch (152 mm) guns; 6 × 4.7-inch (120 mm) guns; 8 × 12-pounder (3-inch, 76 mm) guns; 3 × 3-pounder (47 mm) guns; 3 submerged 18 inch (450 mm) torpedo tubes
- Armour: Deck: 1.5–3 in (38–76 mm); Conning tower: 9 in (229 mm)

The Arrogant-class cruiser was a class of four protected cruisers built for the Royal Navy at the end of the 1890s. One ship, HMS Gladiator, was lost following a collision with a merchant ship in 1908, while HMS Vindictive saw active service in the First World War, taking part in the Zeebrugge Raid in April 1918 before being sunk as a blockship during the Second Ostend Raid in May 1918.

== Design ==
The 1895–96 programme of naval construction for the Royal Navy included provision for four Second-class cruisers of the Arrogant class. (Note: Earlier plans allowed for up to six Arrogant-class cruisers.) While most contemporary Royal Navy cruisers were intended for trade protection, the Arrogant class was designed to operate with the main battle fleet, finishing off crippled enemy ships by ramming. They were originally described as "Fleet Rams".

To suit the class for its proposed role, the ram bow was larger and stronger than normal. It was supported by the ship's protective deck and by 2 inches (51 mm) of side armour plating covering the forward part of the ship. While the protective deck had a similar thickness 1.5–3 inches (38–76 mm) compared to that of the preceding Eclipse class, the ship's conning tower had much thicker protection than normal, with 9 inches (230 mm) of armour to resist close-range enemy shells. The design had a shorter hull with greater beam and an auxiliary rudder ahead of the main rudder to improve manoeuvrability (with a turning circle of 380 yards (350 m) compared with 650 yards (590 m) for the same-length Astraea-class cruisers).

The Arrogants were the first British second-class cruisers to use water-tube boilers, with 18 Belleville boilers feeding triple-expansion steam engines which drove two shafts, giving a speed of 18 knots (33 km/h; 21 mph). The ships' main gun armament was a mixture of four 6 in (152 mm) guns and six 4.7 in (120 mm) guns, and a secondary armament of eight 12-pounder (76 mm) and three 3 pounder (47 mm) guns, supplemented by 5 machine guns and three 18 in (457 mm) torpedo tubes. The Arrogants, like many of the armoured cruisers built for the Royal Navy, were often criticised by the contemporary press, with the 1896 Brassey's Naval Annual considering that the class's armament and speed were "hardly satisfactory", with unfavourable comparisons made to armoured cruisers being built for export, and ships in service with France and Germany. The ships’ armament was strengthened in 1903–04, when the existing main gun armament was replaced by a homogeneous battery of ten 6 inch guns.

== History ==
The four ships were laid down at Devonport and Portsmouth naval dockyards in 1895–96, launching in 1896–97 and were completed between 1898 and 1900.

HMS Gladiator collided with the American liner SS Saint Paul in a heavy snowstorm off the Isle of Wight on 25 April 1908, sinking with the loss of 27 men. Although she was raised in October 1908, Gladiator proved too expensive to repair and was sold for scrap.

HMS Arrogant became a submarine depot ship in 1911, while HMS Furious was paid off in 1912, being renamed HMS Forte in 1915, serving as a hulk attached to the stone frigate (or shore establishment) HMS Vernon. HMS Vindictive served as a tender attached to HMS Vernon from 1912 until the outbreak of the First World War, when she returned to active service. In 1918, Vindictive was converted to an assault ship for the Zeebrugge Raid on 23 April, and following that was scuttled as a blockship during the Second Ostend Raid on 10 May 1918.

== Ships ==
Name	Builder	Laid Down	Launched	Commissioned	Cost	Fate
Arrogant	Devonport Dockyard	10 June 1895	26 May 1896	1898	£278,878	Sold 1923
Furious	Devonport Dockyard	10 June 1895	3 December 1896	1 July 1898	£280,772	Sold 1923
Gladiator	Portsmouth Dockyard	27 January 1896	18 December 1896	April 1899	£287,642	Sank in collision 25 April 1908; Raised and scrapped 1908
Vindictive	Portsmouth Dockyard	27 January 1896	9 December 1897	4 July 1900	£290,458	Scuttled as blockship 10 May 1918
