= George Purefoy-Jervoise =

English politician

George Purefoy-Jervoise (10 April 1770 – 1 December 1847) was an English landowner and politician.

He was the eldest son of Rev. George Hudleston Jervoise Purefoy Jervoise of Britford, Wiltshire. He was educated at Westminster School from 1781 to 1786 and Corpus Christi College, Oxford from 1787 to 1791. He inherited the Herriard estate in Hampshire from his uncle Tristram Jervoise of Britford.

He served in the North Hampshire Militia during the French Revolutionary and Napoleonic Wars, first as a Captain (21 January 1794), rising to Major (29 May 1794), Lieutenant-Colonel (7 March 1796) and Colonel (17 March 1800). He resigned on 12 July 1811.

He was a Member of Parliament (MP) for Salisbury, 17 February 1813 – 1818, and for Hampshire 1820–1826. He was appointed High Sheriff of Hampshire for 1830–1831.

A house called Manor House was built for him at Stratford Tony, Wiltshire in 1833.

He married twice: firstly Elizabeth, the daughter and heiress of Thomas Hall of Preston Candover, Hampshire, and secondly Anna Maria Selina, the daughter of Wadham Locke of Rowdeford, Wiltshire.

Parliament of the United Kingdom
Preceded by William Hussey; Viscount Folkestone	Member of Parliament for Salisbury; 1813–1818; With: Viscount Folkestone	Succeeded by Viscount Folkestone; Wadham Wyndham
Preceded by William John Chute; Thomas Freeman-Heathcote	Member of Parliament for Hampshire; 181–1820; With: John Willis Fleming	Succeeded by John Willis Fleming; Sir William Heathcote, Bt
