= Brownston House =

House in Devizes, Wiltshire, England

Coordinates: 51.3536°N 1.9935°W

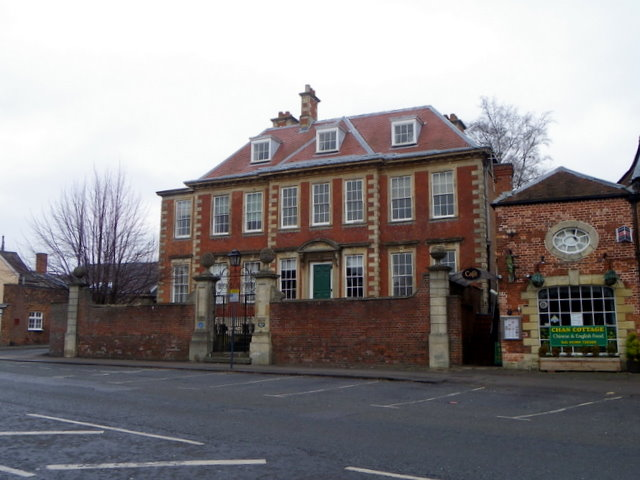
Brownston House, Devizes

Brownston House (or Brownstone House) is a Grade I listed building on New Park Street, Devizes, Wiltshire, England, dating from the beginning of the 18th century. It is a Grade I listed building.

== Architecture ==
Built of dark rubbed brickwork of fine quality, the house has two storeys and an attic and basement. The wide symmetrical front has a three bay central projection. There is a stone plinth, chamfered stone quoins, and an elaborate stone cornice. The central main entrance has a tall eight-panel door in a plain frame with a stone surround. The hipped roof is of old tiles, and has three dormer windows, and the house has square brick chimneys with stone quoins.

The house was designated as Grade I listed in 1972.

== History ==
The house was built about the year 1700 (326 years ago) for Francis Merewether of Devizes and Easterton, who was High Sheriff of Wiltshire for 1700. He was Member of Parliament for Devizes in 1701 and again from 1703 to 1705.

In 1720 the house was occupied by Thomas Browne, a barrister, who made additions in Bath stone to give the house its present form. His initials are on the heads of the rainwater pipes. He was still living there in 1736.

The house was in the possession of members of the Garth family from about 1740 to 1779. John Garth (1701–1764) was Member of Parliament for Devizes in 1740 and continued to serve until his death in 1764. He was the son of Colonel Thomas Garth by his marriage to Elizabeth Colleton, a granddaughter of Sir John Colleton, 1st Baronet, one of the proprietors of South Carolina. Garth's wife Rebecca Brompton was the granddaughter of Sir Richard Raynsford, Chief Justice of the King's Bench. Their son Thomas Garth became a general of the British Army and an Equerry to George III. Their son Charles Garth was a barrister and another Member of Parliament for Devizes. Before that, he was successively Crown Agent for South Carolina, Georgia and Maryland. On his father's death Charles succeeded him as a Member of Parliament for Devizes for sixteen years, between 1764 and 1780, and Brownston House was his Devizes home from 1764 to about 1779. By 1780, Charles Garth had moved permanently to Walthamstow, near London.

Wadham Locke and his wife Anne Sutton moved into Brownston House soon after their wedding early in 1779. He was an attorney and a banker. Their son, another Wadham Locke (1779–1833), later a Member of Parliament, was born in the house in October 1779 and married the heiress Anna Maria Powell in Salisbury in 1802.

Charles Trinder (born 1794), a surgeon, and surgeon to Devizes Prison (the 'County House of Corrections'), was living at Brownston House by 1839, and in 1841 was there with his Ellen. Their daughter Frances was born in the house in 1842.

The Misses Bidwells' Ladies Boarding School, sometimes called a Seminary, occupied Brownston House from 1859 to 1901. From 1901 until about 1929 or later the house was occupied by the two unmarried daughters of Henry S. Hilman, a barrister of Kent, Worcestershire, and Kensington, who had died in 1893. Architectural plans for 'alterations and additions' to Brownston House by the architect Harold Brakspear drawn up in December 1901 are preserved in the Wiltshire and Swindon Archives. Miss Bertha M. Hilman was still living in the house in December 1928, after the death of her sister, but she died in 1929. The house then became a nurses' hostel for the Devizes and District Hospital. When no longer required for this purpose, it fell into disrepair and was bought by Kennet District Council, which undertook a programme of restoration and repair. After that, it was used as a doctor's surgery and as offices for Wiltshire County Council's Social Services department, until being sold by Kennet in 2000 to a company called Renelec, plumbing & heating engineers, to be used once again as offices.
