= Rowland Bourke =

Rowland Bourke VC DSO
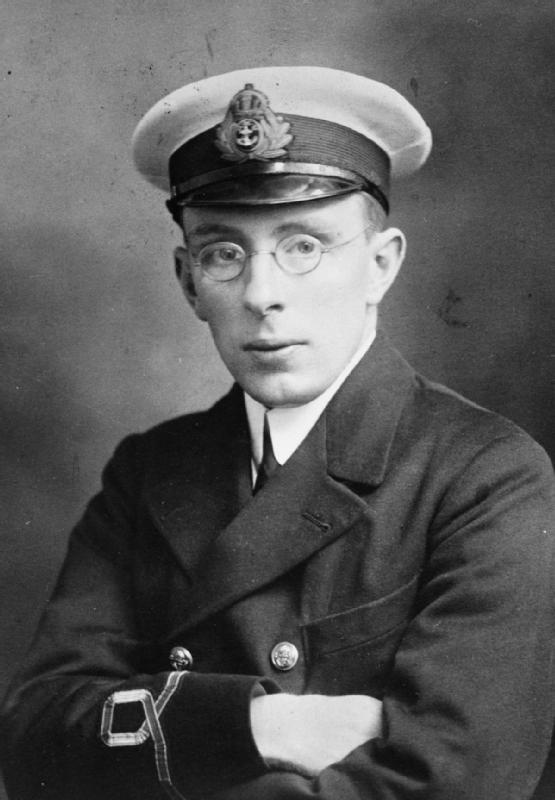
- Lieutenant Rowland Bourke in c. 1917
- Born: 28 November 1885; London, England
- Died: 29 August 1958 (aged 72); British Columbia, Canada
- Burial place: Royal Oak Burial Park, Victoria, British Columbia (section O, plot 10, grave 16)
- Military career
- Allegiance: United Kingdom; Canada
- Branch: Royal Navy Volunteer Reserve (1916–19); Royal Canadian Naval Volunteer Reserve (1941–50)
- Service years: 1916–1919; 1941–1950
- Rank: Commander
- Nickname: Rowley
- Commands: HMCS Givenchy; HMCS Esquimalt; HMCS Burrard; ML276
- Conflicts: First World War: First Ostend Raid; Second World War
- Awards: Victoria Cross; Distinguished Service Order; Mentioned in Despatches; Legion of Honour (France)
- Other work: Miner; Fruit grower

Rowland Richard Louis "Rowley" Bourke, VC, DSO (28 November 1885 – 29 August 1958) was a Canadian farmer, sailor, and a recipient of the Victoria Cross, the highest award for gallantry in the face of the enemy that can be awarded to British and Commonwealth forces.

Bourke was born in London, England, and emigrated to Canada in 1902. He returned to the United Kingdom on the outbreak of the First World War, and after initially being rejected due to poor eyesight, he enlisted in the Royal Naval Volunteer Reserve in 1916.

== Early life ==
Born on 28 November 1885 in London, England, Bourke moved to Canada in 1902. He became a miner in the Klondike and a fruit grower in British Columbia. In January 1916, he volunteered for the Royal Naval Volunteer Reserve.

== Naval career ==
=== First World War ===
Following the outbreak of the First World War, Bourke volunteered to enlist in the Canadian military. He was rejected by all three arms of service due to poor eyesight. Undeterred, Bourke returned to England, at his own expense, where he successfully joined the Royal Naval Volunteer Reserve, serving on motor launches.

In April 1918, Bourke volunteered his motor launch to participate in the blockading of the Belgian harbour of Zeebrugge-Ostend, during the First Ostend Raid. The motor launches were detailed to rescue personnel from ships sunk in the blockade effort. Initially rejected from participating due to his eyesight, Bourke continued to volunteer his launch, despite knowing that volunteering put him and his crew in great peril. During action on the night of 23 April, Bourke's launch picked up 38 sailors from the blockship HMS Brilliant and towed the crippled ML 532 out of the harbour. For showing "the greatest coolness and skill in handling his motor-launch", Bourke was awarded the Distinguished Service Order (DSO).

On 9 and 10 May 1918 at Ostend, Belgium, after the crew of HMS Vindictive had been taken off, Bourke, commanding Motor Launch 276, went into the harbour to check that everybody had got away. After searching and finding no one, he withdrew, but hearing cries from the water he turned back, found an officer and two seamen clinging to an up-turned boat, and rescued them. During this time the motor launch was under very heavy fire and was hit 55 times, once by a 6-inch shell, which killed two crew and did considerable damage. Lieutenant Bourke, however, managed to take the motor launch into the open sea, and was taken in tow. In recognition of his gallantry and devotion to duty, Bourke was gazetted the Victoria Cross on 27 August 1918.

=== Second World War ===
Prior to the outbreak of the Second World War, Bourke was instrumental in organizing a Fishermen's Reserve, to patrol the west coast of Canada. He served as a recruiting officer for a period of time but in 1941 he returned to sea, with the Royal Canadian Navy Volunteer Reserve. He served as commander of HMCS Givenchy, HMCS Esquimalt, and HMCS Burrard, Vancouver. He ended his naval career in 1950 with the rank of commander.

== Death and legacy ==
Bourke is buried in section O, plot 10, grave 16 in Royal Oak Burial Park, Falaise Drive, Victoria, British Columbia. His medals are held at Library and Archives Canada in Ottawa.

The Canadian Hydrographic Service named Mount Bourke in 1945. It is located southwest of Megin Lake and northeast of Hot Springs Cove, north of Tofino, British Columbia. Mount Bourke is located at latitude 49°27′56 and longitude 126°11′02.

HMCS Malahat, Victoria's Naval Reserve Division, honours Bourke at his gravesite in Royal Oak Burial Park with a graveside ceremony each Remembrance Day.
