= Geoffrey Drummond =

Recipient of the Victoria Cross

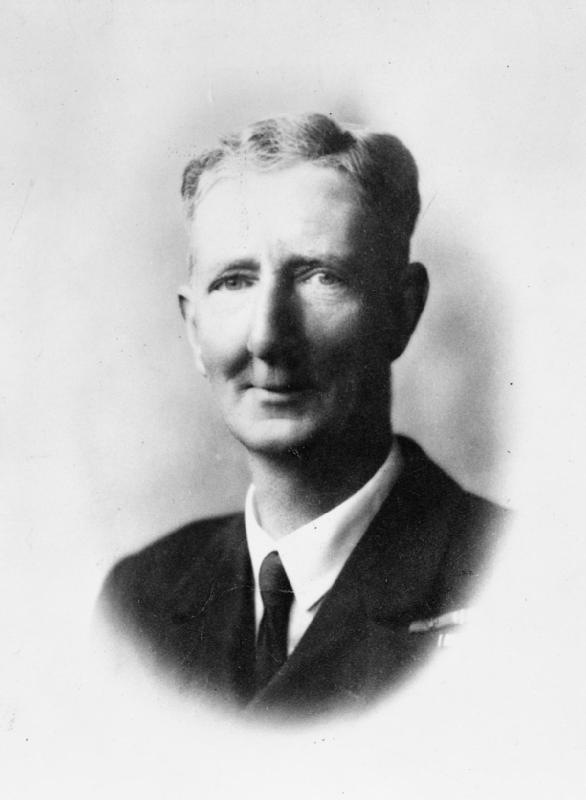
- Born: 25 January 1886; 13 St James's Place, London
- Died: 21 April 1941 (aged 55); Rotherhithe, London
- Burial place: St Peter's Church Cemetery, Chalfont St Peter
- Military career
- Allegiance: United Kingdom
- Branch: Royal Naval Volunteer Reserve
- Service years: 1915–1919; 1940–1941
- Rank: Lieutenant Commander
- Conflicts: First World War; Second World War
- Awards: Victoria Cross; Mentioned in Despatches; Legion of Honour (France)

Geoffrey Heneage Drummond, VC (25 January 1886 – 21 April 1941) was a British land agent, businessman, sailor, and a recipient of the Victoria Cross, the highest award for gallantry in the face of the enemy that can be awarded to British and Commonwealth forces.

== Early life and First World War ==
Drummond was born on 25 January 1886. He was 32 years old, and a lieutenant in the Royal Naval Volunteer Reserve during the First World War, and was awarded the VC for his part in the Second Ostend Raid.

On 9/10 May 1918 at Ostend, Belgium, Lieutenant Drummond commanding HMML (Motor Launch) 254, volunteered for rescue work and was following HMS Vindictive to the harbour when a shell burst on board killing an officer and a deck hand and badly wounding the coxswain and Lieutenant Drummond. Notwithstanding his wounds, this officer brought M.L. 254 alongside Vindictive and then took off two officers and 38 men, some of whom were killed or wounded while embarking. He retained consciousness long enough to back his vessel away from the piers and towards the open sea before collapsing exhausted from his wounds.

== Post-war ==
Drummond married Maude Aylmer Tindal Bosanquet (d 27 Sept, 1967) on 2 July 1918.

Despite suffering from his severe wounds received in his VC action, Drummond served with the Royal Naval Patrol Service in the Second World War.

Drummond died on 21 April 1941 from a fall. His VC is on display in the Lord Ashcroft Gallery at the Imperial War Museum, London.

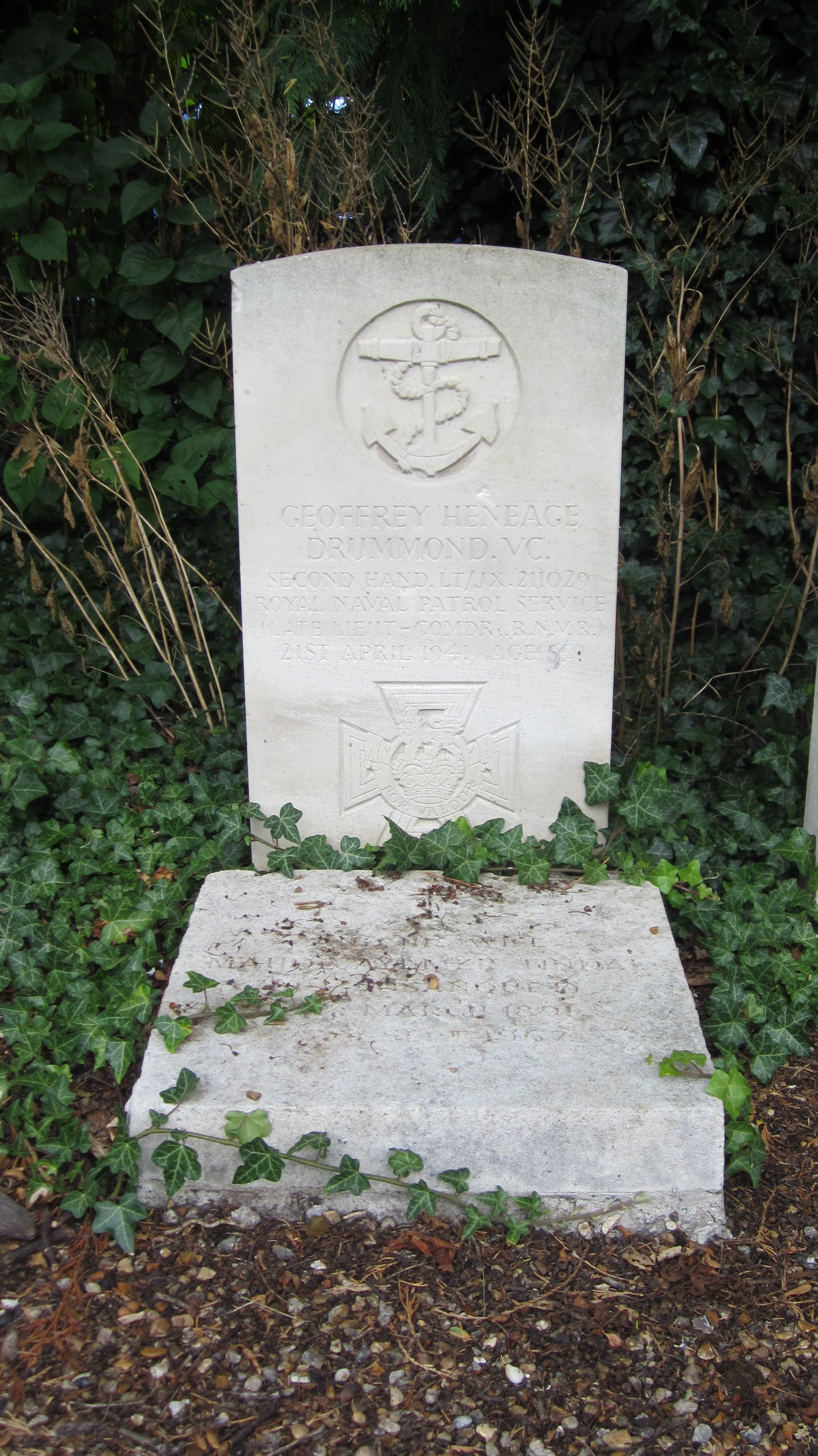
Drummond's grave in Chalfont St Peter
