= Wadham Locke =

English banker and politician

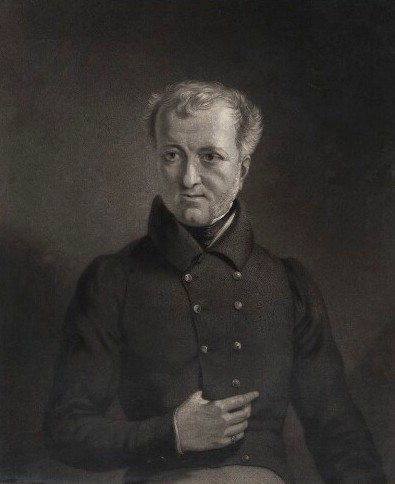
Wadham Locke

Wadham Locke (1779–1835) was an English banker and politician.

== Life ==
Locke was born at Brownston House, Devizes, Wiltshire, the only son of Wadham Locke II and his wife Anne Sutton, daughter of James Sutton. He was High Sheriff of Wiltshire in 1804. In 1805 he purchased Rowdeford House and estate, two miles northwest of Devizes, from Thomas Wyatt.

Locke was an MP for Devizes in 1832; he first stood for Devizes in 1818 as a reformer, at which time the constituency had not been contested since 1765.

== Family ==
Locke married in 1802 Anna Maria Selina Powell, sister of Alexander Powell, MP for Downton.

- The eldest son Wadham Locke married first, in 1828, Caroline Mary Thompson, daughter of Henry Thompson of Yorkshire, who died in 1842. He married secondly, in 1844, Albinia Dalton, daughter of John Dalton of Steningford Park.
- The second son Francis Alexander Sydenham Locke married in 1835 Katherine Harriet Fellowes, eldest daughter of Thomas Fellowes R.N.
- The fourth son John Locke married in 1839 Frances Augusta Wayne, daughter of Thomas Moore Wayne. He joined the East India Company as a civil servant in Bengal, and later lived at Chicklade House in Wiltshire.

The Lockes had six daughters. The youngest in the family was Frances Isabella, known as the diarist Fanny Duberly, who married in 1850 Henry Duberly (1822–1891). The eldest daughter, Anna Maria Selina, married George Purefoy-Jervoise. After his death, she married in 1848 Francis Marx. The other daughters were:

- Elizabeth Sarah, died 1833
- Anne, married 1838 the Rev. Henry Paddon
- Louisa, married William Lawrence Colquhoun, and secondly James Dunlop of Glasgow
- Katharine Powell, married George Duberly, colonel of the 77th Regiment.
