= 75th Regiment of Foot (Prince of Wales's Regiment) =

Infantry regiment of the British Army

The 75th Regiment of Foot (Prince of Wales's Regiment) was an infantry regiment of the British Army from 1778 to 1783.

The regiment was raised in Wales in January 1778 and named after the future King George IV. Apart from some officers seconded to North America, the regiment remained based in Wales until it was disbanded in 1783.

== Regimental Colonels ==
- 1778–1779: Gen. William Picton
- 1779–1782: Gen. George Morrison
- 1782–1783: Maj-Gen. Thomas Pelham-Clinton, 3rd Duke of Newcastle (Earl of Lincoln)
