= John Garth (politician) =

British lawyer and Whig politician

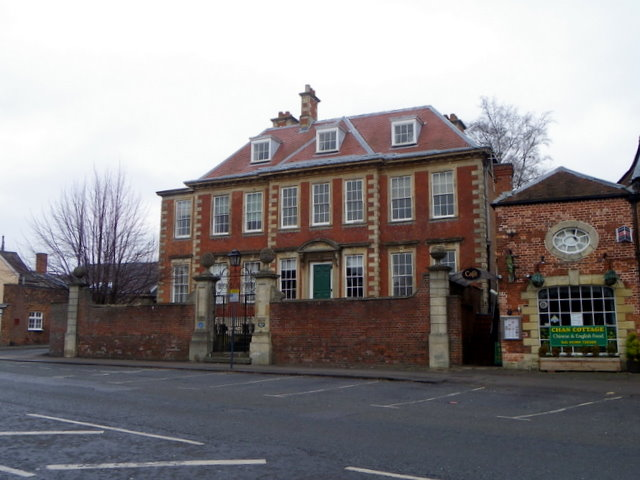
Brownston/Garth House

John Garth (c. 1701–1764), of Garth House, Devizes, Wiltshire, was a British lawyer and Whig politician who sat in the House of Commons from 1740 to 1764.

== Early life ==
Garth was second, but eldest surviving, son of Colonel Thomas Garth of Harrold, Bedfordshire and his wife Elizabeth Colleton, granddaughter of Sir John Colleton, 1st Baronet, one of the original proprietors of South Carolina. John Garth was also a nephew of Sir Samuel Garth the physician. He was admitted at Lincoln's Inn on 7 May 1718, and matriculated at Clare College, Cambridge on 24 October 1719. He was admitted at Inner Temple on 5 May 1727 and was called to the bar in 1728. In 1731 he succeeded to the estates of his father. He married Rebecca Brompton (1713–1785), daughter of John Brompton of Whitton and granddaughter of Sir Richard Raynsford, English judge and Chief Justice of the King's Bench in about 1730. His family home in Devizes was Brownston House, renamed Garth House, a large Grade I listed house on New Park Street.

== Career ==
Garth became the Recorder for Devizes in 1732, a role roughly equivalent to the Town Clerk today and usually held by a lawyer. He was returned unopposed as Member of Parliament (MP) for Devizes on his own interest at a by-election on 26 February 1740. He was returned unopposed again in 1741 and 1747.

Garth was returned again as MP for Devizes at the 1754 and was considered one of the Old Whigs. In 1756 he spoke of fifteen years of constant attendance and steady concurrence in the support of the measures of Government in Parliament without any assistance or return. In 1759 he suffered a stroke of palsy and was not expected to recover. As a result, there was a flurry of prospective candidates for Devizes at the next election, but he was encouraged to stand and was returned unopposed at the 1761 British general election. He was reported absent on many occasions and there is no record of his voting in the Parliament.

== Death and legacy ==
Garth died on 24 December 1764 and was buried in St Mary's Churchyard, Devizes on 2 January 1765. One monument of St. Mary's commemorates John Garth himself and in the chancel there are monuments to the memory of his widow and children. Their children were:

- George Garth (about 1733–1819) British General in American Revolutionary War, Colonel of the 17th Regiment of Foot
- Charles Garth MP, (1734–1784) Government Agent for South Carolina, Georgia and Maryland. He succeeded his father as MP for Devizes, and was also Recorder of Devizes.
- Elizabeth (1739–1790)
- Frances (1743- 1768)
- Thomas Garth (1744–1829), Army general and Royal Equerry to George III.

Rebecca, Frances and Elizabeth were also buried in St Mary's.

== Notes ==
Parliament of the United Kingdom
Preceded by Francis Eyles; Sir Joseph Eyles	Member of Parliament for Devizes; 1740–1764; With: Francis Eyles (1740–1742); George Lee (1742–1747); William Willy (1747–1764)	Succeeded by Charles Garth; William Willy
