= Charles Garth =

British politician

Charles Garth, (c.1734 – 9 March 1784) was a British Member of Parliament (MP) and Colonial Agent in pre-revolutionary America.

== Early life ==
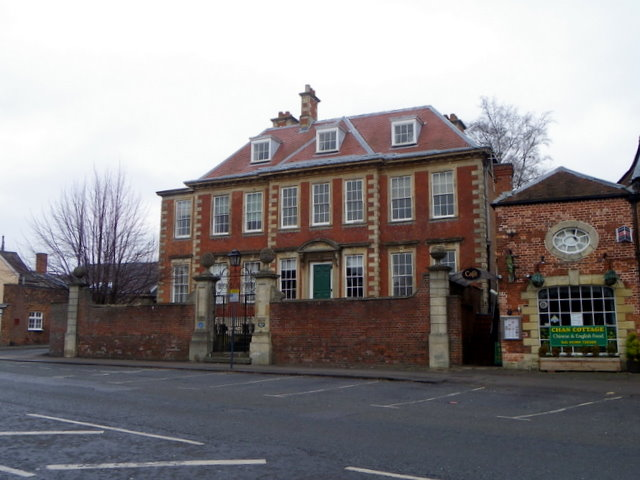
Brownston House, Devizes, Wiltshire

He was born in about 1734, the son of John Garth MP of Devizes, Wiltshire, and Rebecca, daughter of John Brompton and granddaughter of Sir Richard Raynsford, Lord Chief Justice of the King's bench.

Garth was educated at Merton College, Oxford and the Inner Temple, being called to the bar in 1758.

== Career ==
Garth was the Crown Agent for South Carolina, Georgia, and briefly Maryland, between 1763 and 1775.

In 1764 he succeeded his father as MP for Devizes, and was re-elected in 1765, 1768 and 1780. He relinquished his seat in November 1780 to become HM Commissioner of Excise. He also followed his father by serving as Recorder of Devizes.

Garth lived at his father's house, Brownston House, Devizes, in the 1760s and 1770s. He died on 9 March 1784 while living at Walthamstow.

== Family ==
- As of 1764, wife Fanny, daughter of John Cooper of Cumberwell, granddaughter of Peter Bathurst (1687–1748)
- Brother: Gen. Thomas Garth (1744–1829), chief equerry to King George III
- Brother: Gen. George Garth (c. 1735–1819), general in the American Revolutionary War, Colonel of the 17th Regiment of Foot
- Son: Capt. Thomas Garth, who married Charlotte Maitland, daughter of General Frederick Maitland.

Parliament of the United Kingdom
Preceded by John Garth and William Willy	Member of Parliament for Devizes; 1764–1780; Served alongside: William Willy (1764–1765); James Sutton (1765–1780); Sir James Tylney Long, Bt. (1780–1780)	Succeeded by Sir James Tylney Long, Bt. and Henry Jones
