= First Ostend Raid =

1918 British military attack on German-held port in Belgium

Coordinates: 51°13′28″N 2°54′35″E

- Part of North Sea Operations, First World War
- North Sea
Date	23–24 April 1918
Location	Ostend, Belgium
Result	German victory

Belligerents
(United Kingdom of Great Britain and Ireland) British Empire; France	German Empire

Commanders and leaders
(United Kingdom) Hubert Lynes (United Kingdom) Alfred Godsal	

Strength
See British order of battle below	Shore defences

Casualties and losses
Unknown (Note: British casualties in the Ostend raid were quite heavy amongst the crews of the blockships but are not known individually, generally being combined with the Zeebrugge casualties of 214 dead and over 300 wounded.)	Unknown, negligible

The First Ostend Raid (part of Operation ZO) was the first of two attacks by the Royal Navy on the German-held port of Ostend during the late spring of 1918 during the First World War. Ostend was attacked in conjunction with the neighbouring harbour of Zeebrugge on 23 April in order to block the vital strategic port of Bruges, situated 6 mi (5.2 nmi; 9.7 km) inland and ideally sited to conduct raiding operations on the British coastline and shipping lanes. Bruges and its satellite ports were a vital part of the German plans in their war on Allied commerce (Handelskrieg) because Bruges was close to the troopship lanes across the English Channel and allowed much quicker access to the Western Approaches for the U-boat fleet than their bases in Germany.

The plan of attack was for the British raiding force to sink two obsolete cruisers in the canal mouth at Ostend and three at Zeebrugge, thus preventing raiding ships leaving Bruges. The Ostend canal was the smaller and narrower of the two channels giving access to Bruges and so was considered a secondary target behind the Zeebrugge Raid. Consequently, fewer resources were provided to the force assaulting Ostend. While the attack at Zeebrugge garnered some limited success, the assault on Ostend was a complete failure. The German marines who defended the port had taken careful preparations and drove the British assault ships astray, forcing the abortion of the operation at the final stage.

Three weeks after the failure of the operation, a second attack was launched which proved more successful in sinking a blockship at the entrance to the canal but ultimately did not close off Bruges completely. Further plans to attack Ostend came to nothing during the summer of 1918, and the threat from Bruges would not be finally stopped until the last days of the war, when the town was liberated by Allied land forces.

== Bruges ==
Bruges had been captured by the advancing German divisions during the Race for the Sea and had been rapidly identified as an important strategic asset by the German Navy. Bruges was situated 6 mi (5.2 nmi; 9.7 km) inland at the centre of a network of canals which emptied into the sea at the small coastal towns of Zeebrugge and Ostend. This land barrier protected Bruges from bombardment by land or sea by all but the very largest calibre artillery and also secured it against raiding parties from the Royal Navy. Capitalising on the natural advantages of the port, the German Navy constructed extensive training and repair facilities at Bruges, equipped to provide support for several flotillas of destroyers, torpedo boats and U-boats.

By 1916, these raiding forces were causing serious concern in the Admiralty as the proximity of Bruges to the British coast, to the troopship lanes across the English Channel and for the U-boats, to the Western Approaches; the heaviest shipping lanes in the World at the time. In the late spring of 1915, Admiral Reginald Bacon had attempted without success to destroy the lock gates at Ostend with monitors. This effort failed, and Bruges became increasingly important in the Atlantic Campaign, which reached its height in 1917. By early 1918, the Admiralty was seeking ever more radical solutions to the problems raised by unrestricted submarine warfare, including instructing the "Allied Naval and Marine Forces" department to plan attacks on U-boat bases in Belgium.

The "Allied Naval and Marine Forces" was a newly formed department created with the purpose of conducting raids and operations along the coastline of German-held territory. The organisation was able to command extensive resources from both the Royal and French navies and was commanded by Admiral Roger Keyes and his deputy, Commodore Hubert Lynes. Keyes, Lynes and their staff began planning methods of neutralising Bruges in late 1917 and by April 1918 were ready to put their plans into operation.

== Planning ==
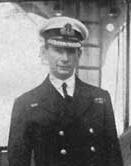
Admiral Roger Keyes

To block Bruges, Keyes and Lynes decided to conduct two raids on the ports through which Bruges had access to the sea. Zeebrugge was to be attacked by a large force consisting of three blockships and numerous supporting warships. Ostend was faced by a similar but smaller force under immediate command of Lynes. The plan was for two obsolete cruisers—HMS Sirius and Brilliant—to be expended in blocking the canal which emptied at Ostend. These ships would be stripped to essential fittings and their lower holds and ballast filled with rubble and concrete. This would make them ideal barriers to access if sunk in the correct channel at the correct angle.

When the weather was right, the force would cross the English Channel in darkness and attack shortly after midnight to coincide with the Zeebrugge Raid a few miles up the coast. By co-ordinating their operations, the assault forces would stretch the German defenders and hopefully gain the element of surprise. Covering the Inshore Squadron would be heavy bombardment from an offshore squadron of monitors and destroyers as well as artillery support from Royal Marine artillery near Ypres in Allied-held Flanders. Closer support would be offered by several flotillas of motor launches, small torpedo boats and Coastal Motor Boats which would lay smoke screens to obscure the advancing blockships as well as evacuate the crews of the cruisers after they had blocked the channel.

=== British order of battle ===
==== Offshore Squadron ====
- Lord Clive-class monitors with 12 in (300 mm) guns:
  - HMS Marshal Soult, Lord Clive, Prince Eugene and General Crauford
- M15 class monitors with 7.5 in (190 mm) guns:
  - HMS M24, M26, M21
- Destroyers:
  - HMS Mentor, Lightfoot and Zubian
  - French Navy Mécanicien Principal Lestin, Enseigne Roux and Bouclier
- Light craft:
  - 4 torpedo boats, 4 French motor launches

==== Inshore Squadron ====
- Blockships:
  - HMS Sirius, Brilliant
- Destroyers:
  - HMS Swift, Faulknor (destroyer leader), Matchless, (Note: An Admiralty M class destroyer.) Mastiff, Afridi, Tempest, Tetrarch
- Light craft:
  - 18 Motor Launches, 8 Coastal Motor Boats

Artillery support was also provided by Royal Marine heavy artillery in Allied-held Flanders. The force was covered in the English Channel by seven light cruisers and 16 destroyers, none of which saw action.

== Attack on Ostend ==
The assaults on Zeebrugge and Ostend were launched on 23 April, after being twice delayed by poor weather. The Ostend force arrived off the port shortly before midnight and made final preparations; the monitors took up position offshore and the small craft moved forward to begin laying smoke. Covering the approach, the monitors opened fire on German shore defences, including the 11-inch (280 mm) guns of the powerful "Tirpitz" battery. As a long-range artillery duel developed, the cruisers began their advance towards the harbour mouth, searching for the marker buoys which indicated the correct passage through the diverse sandbanks which made navigation difficult along the Belgian coast.

It was at this stage that the attack began to go seriously wrong. Strong winds blowing off the land swept the smoke screen into the face of the advancing cruisers, blinding their commanders who attempted to navigate by dead reckoning. The same wind disclosed the Inshore Squadron to the German defenders who immediately opened up a withering fire on the blockships. With their volunteer crews suffering heavy casualties, the commanders increased speed despite the poor visibility and continued groping through the narrow channels inshore, searching for the Stroom Bank buoy which directed shipping into the canal.

Commander Alfred Godsal led the assault in HMS Brilliant and it was he who stumbled into the most effective German counter-measure first. As Brilliant staggered through the murk, the lookout spotted the buoy ahead and Godsal headed directly for it, coming under even heavier fire as he did so. Passing the navigation marker at speed, the cruiser was suddenly brought to a halt with a juddering lurch, throwing men to the decks and sticking fast in deep mud well outside the harbour mouth. Before warnings could be relayed to the Sirius following up close behind, she too passed the buoy and her captain Lieutenant-Commander Henry Hardy was shocked to see Brilliant dead ahead. With no time to manoeuvre, Sirius ploughed into the port quarter of Brilliant, the blockships settling into the mud in a tangle of wreckage.

Artillery and long-range machine gun fire continued to riddle the wrecks and the combined crews were ordered to evacuate as the officers set the scuttling charges which would sink the blockships in their current, useless locations. As men scrambled down the side of the cruisers into Coastal Motor Boats which would relay them to the Offshore Squadron, destroyers moved closer to Ostend to cover the retreat and the monitors continued their heavy fire. Godsal was the last to leave, picked up by launch ML276 commanded by Lieutenant Rowley Bourke. With the main assault a complete failure, the blockading forces returned to Dover and Dunkirk to assess the disaster.

"Their Lordships will share our disappointment at the defeat of our plans by the legitimate ruse of the enemy."
Admiral Keyes' report to the Admiralty.

When the forces had reassembled and the commanders conferred, the full facts of the failed operation were revealed. The German commander of Ostend had been better prepared than his counterpart at Zeebrugge and had recognised that without the navigation buoy no night attack on Ostend could be successful without a strong familiarity with the port, which none of the British navigators possessed. However, rather than simply remove the buoy, the German commander had ordered it moved 2,400 yd (2,200 m) east of the canal mouth into the centre of a wide expanse of sandbanks, acting as a fatal decoy for any assault force.

== Aftermath ==
The assault at Zeebrugge a few miles away from Ostend was more successful and the blocking of the major channel did cause some consternation amongst the German forces in Bruges. The larger raiders could no longer leave the port, but smaller ships, including most submarines, were still able to traverse via Ostend. In addition, within hours a narrow channel had also been carved through Zeebrugge too, although British intelligence did not realise this for several weeks. The defeat at Ostend did not entirely dampen the exuberant British media and public reaction to Zeebrugge, but in the Admiralty and particularly in the Allied Naval and Marine Forces the failure to completely neutralise Bruges rankled.

A second operation (Operation VS) was planned for 10 May using the cruiser HMS Vindictive and proved more successful, but ultimately it also failed to completely close off Bruges. A third planned operation was never conducted as it rapidly became clear that the new channel carved at Zeebrugge was enough to allow access for U-boats, thus calling for an even larger double assault, which would stretch the resources of the Allied Naval and Marine Forces too far. British losses in the three futile attempts to close Bruges cost over 600 casualties and the loss of several ships but Bruges would remain an active raiding base for the German Navy until October 1918.
