= George Morrison (British Army officer) =

British Army general

General George Morrison
- Born: 1703
- Died: 26 November 1799 (aged 95–96); London
- Military career
- Allegiance: Great Britain
- Branch: British Army
- Rank: General

General George Morrison (1703 – 26 November 1799) was Quartermaster-General to the Forces.

== Military career ==
Morrison joined the British Army as a gunner in 1722. He was involved in suppressing the Jacobite rising of 1745 and as a result was sent to Royal Military Academy, Woolwich as an Officer Cadet.

Morrison led the construction of a series of roads in Scotland on the orders of Field Marshal George Wade. In 1757 he was commissioned as a Captain-Lieutenant and in 1758 he served in the Seven Years' War in which he led the destruction of a number of forts in France.

In 1763 he was appointed Quartermaster-General to the Forces, although this was not gazetted until 1773, From 1779 to 1782 he was Colonel of the short-lived 75th Regiment of Foot (Prince of Wales's Regiment). In 1782 he was made Colonel of the 17th (Leicestershire) Regiment of Foot and in 1792 was made Colonel of the King's Own Royal Regiment (Lancaster), a command he held until his death.

In 1796 he was promoted to full General.

== Family ==
He married Mary and together they had six children.

Military offices
Preceded by Humphrey Bland	Quartermaster-General to the Forces; 1763–1796	Succeeded by David Dundas
Preceded by Lt-Gen. Sir John Burgoyne	Colonel of the 4th (The King's Own) Regiment of Foot; 1792–1799	Succeeded by Gen. John Pitt, 2nd Earl of Chatham
Preceded by Brig-Gen. Hon Robert Monckton	Colonel of the 17th (Leicestershire) Regiment of Foot; 1782–1792	Succeeded by Major-Gen. George Garth
Preceded by Gen. William Picton	Colonel of the 75th Regiment of Foot (Prince of Wales's Regiment); 1779–1782	Succeeded by Major-Gen. Thomas Pelham-Clinton, 3rd Duke of Newcastle
