= George Garth =

British Army general

George Garth (1733–1819) was a British General, a commander in the American Revolutionary War, and Colonel of the 17th Regiment of Foot.

== Life ==
He was son of John Garth MP and Rebecca, the daughter of John Brompton and granddaughter of Sir Richard Raynsford, Lord Chief Justice of the King's Bench.

He joined the Army and served for 37 years in the 1st Regiment of Foot Guards.

Garth served as second-in-command to William Tryon, during the attack on New Haven, Connecticut, in the summer of 1779 when on 5 July his forces landed at West Haven, while those of Tryon landed at East Haven.

Dispatched to replace General Augustine Prevost at Savannah, Garth was taken prisoner on HMS Experiment.

In 1789 he was promoted Lieutenant-Colonel of his regiment and in 1792 transferred as Colonel to the 17th (Leicestershire) Regiment of Foot, which post he held to his death. He was promoted to the rank of General in 1810 and later became Lieutenant Governor of Placentia, Newfoundland.

He died in 1819 in Beverley, Yorkshire at the age of 86, and is buried in St. Mary's Church, Beverley.

George Garth's Memorial in St. Mary's Church, Beverley, East Yorkshire, UK

== Family ==
- Brother; General Thomas Garth (1744–1829) chief equerry to King George III
- Brother; Charles Garth MP (abt 1734–1784) Member of Parliament, Crown Agent for South Carolina in pre-Revolutionary War America

Military offices
Preceded by George Morrison	Colonel of 17th (Leicestershire) Regiment; 1792–1819	Succeeded by Josiah Champagné
