= Henry Jones (MP) =

Henry Jones (died 1792) was a British politician and clothier in London. He was Member of Parliament for Devizes from 1780 to 1784. He took the place of Charles Garth, elected in September 1780, when Garth accepted a government office, becoming therefore MP in November 1780.

Parliament of Great Britain
Preceded by Charles Garth; Sir James Tylney-Long, Bt	Member of Parliament for Devizes; 1780 – 1784; With: Sir James Tylney-Long, Bt	Succeeded by Henry Addington; Sir James Tylney-Long, Bt
