= Silverwood School =

Location
- Rowde; Devizes, Wiltshire, SN10 2QQ; England
- 51.369°N 2.034°W

Information
- Type: Community special school
- Local authority: Wiltshire Council
- Department for Education URN: 148145 Tables
- Ofsted: Reports
- Head teacher: Sean McKeown
- Gender: Coeducational
- Age: 4 to 19
- Enrolment: 473 (November 2025)
- Website: www.silverwood.wilts.sch.uk

Silverwood School (formerly Rowdeford School and briefly North Wiltshire School) is a special needs community school, near Rowde, Wiltshire, England, for young people with complex needs and autistic spectrum disorders (ASD) aged between 4 and 19. As of November 2025, the school has 473 pupils.

The school is run by Wiltshire Council with additional support from Silverwood School Charity Trust (formed in 2001 as Rowdeford Charity Trust), an independent charity that supports the advancement of education for young people with disabilities and special needs. The school is built around Rowdeford House, a two-storey country house built in 1812 for Wadham Locke, later MP for Devizes.

Weekday boarding places were provided for 23 children, reducing to 16 places in September 2016. Wiltshire Council withdrew funding for these in March 2018, causing boarding cease in July 2018.

In 2020, Rowdeford School merged with Larkrise School in Trowbridge and St Nicholas School in Chippenham to form North Wiltshire School, renamed Silverwood School in 2021. In September 2024 a 350-place extension at the former Rowdeford site was opened, and this became the only site for the whole school.
