= Second Ostend Raid =

1918 Royal Navy operation to block Ostend Harbour

- Part of North Sea Operations, First World War
- Postwar wreck of HMS Vindictive at Ostend
Date	9 May 1918
Location	Ostend, Belgium 51°14′15″N 02°55′21″E
Result	German victory

Belligerents
United Kingdom	Germany

Commanders and leaders
Roger Keyes	

Strength
1 blockship 4 monitors 8 destroyers 5 motor launches Aerial support	Shore defences

Casualties and losses
1 motor launch sunk 8 dead 10 missing 29 wounded	3 killed 8 wounded

The Second Ostend Raid (officially known as Operation VS) was the later of two failed attempts made during the spring of 1918 by the United Kingdom's Royal Navy to block the channels leading to the Belgian port of Ostend as a part of its conflict with the German Empire during World War I. Due to the significant strategic advantages conferred by the Belgian ports, the Imperial German Navy had used Ostend as a base for the U-boat campaign during the Battle of the Atlantic since 1915.

A successful blockade of these bases would have forced German submarines to operate out of more distant ports, such as Wilhelmshaven, on the German coast. This would expose them for longer to Allied countermeasures and reduce the time they could spend raiding. The ports of Ostend and Zeebrugge (partially blocked in the Zeebrugge Raid three weeks previously) provided sea access via canals for the major inland port of Bruges. Bruges was used as a base for small warships and submarines. As it was 6 mi (5.2 nmi; 9.7 km) inland, it was immune to most naval artillery fire and coastal raids, providing a safe harbour for training and repair.

The First Ostend Raid on 23 April 1918 was largely a failure, the blockships grounded too far from the channels to obstruct them. The second attempt also failed, due to heavy German resistance and British navigational difficulties in poor weather. In anticipation of a raid, the Germans had removed the navigation buoys and without them the British had difficulty finding the narrow channel into the harbour in poor weather. When they did discover the entrance, German resistance proved too strong for the operation to be completed as originally planned: the obsolete cruiser HMS Vindictive was sunk, but only partially blocked the channel.

Despite its failure, the raid was presented in Britain as a courageous and daring gamble that came close to success. Three Victoria Crosses and numerous other gallantry medals were awarded to sailors who participated in the operation. British forces had moderate casualties in the raid, while German losses were minimal.

== Bruges ==
After the German Army captured much of Belgium following the Battle of the Frontiers in 1914, the Allied forces were left holding a thin strip of coastline to the west of the Yser. The remainder of the Belgian coast came under the occupation of German Marine Divisions, including the important strategic ports of Antwerp and Bruges. A network of canals connected Bruges with the coast at Ostend and Zeebrugge, through which small warships such as destroyers, light cruisers and submarines could travel and find a safe harbour from which to launch raids into the English Channel and along the coasts of southeast England. U-boats could also depart from Bruges at night, cutting a day off the journey to the Western Approaches, more easily avoiding the North Sea Mine Barrage and allowing U-boat captains to gain familiarity with the net and mine defences of the English Channel, through which they had to pass to reach the main battlegrounds of the Atlantic.

In 1915–1916, the German navy had developed Bruges from a small Flanders port into a major naval centre with large concrete bunkers to shelter U-boats, extensive barracks and training facilities for U-boat crews, and similar facilities for other classes of raiding warship. Bruges was therefore a vital asset in the German navy's increasingly desperate struggle to prevent Britain from receiving food and matériel from the rest of the world. The significance of Bruges was not lost on British naval planners and two previous attempts to close the exit at Ostend, the smaller and narrower of the Bruges canals, had ended in failure. On 7 September 1915, four Lord Clive-class monitors of the Dover Patrol had bombarded the dockyard, while German coastal artillery returned fire. Only 14 rounds were fired by the British with the result that only part of the dockyard was set on fire. In a bombardment on 22 September 1917, the lock gates were hit causing the basin to drain at low water.

Two years passed before the next attempt on the Ostend locks. The First Ostend Raid was conducted in tandem with the similar Zeebrugge Raid led by Acting Vice-Admiral Roger Keyes on 23 April 1918; a large scale operation to block the wider canal at Zeebrugge. Both attacks largely failed, but while at Zeebrugge the operation came so close to success that it took several months for the British authorities to realise that it had been unsuccessful, at Ostend the attack had ended catastrophically. Both blockships intended to close off the canal had grounded over half a mile from their intended location and been scuttled by their crews under heavy artillery and long-range small arms fire, which caused severe casualties. Thus while Zeebrugge seemed to be blocked entirely, Ostend was open wide, nullifying any success that might have been achieved at the other port.

== Planning ==
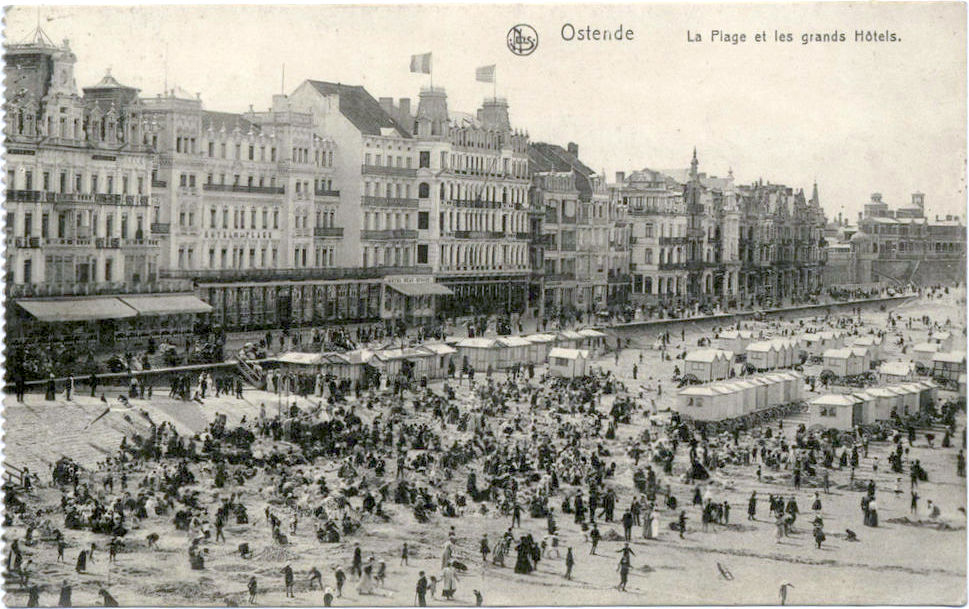
The beachside of the city of Ostende in 1915.

As British forces on the southeast coast of Britain regrouped, remanned and repaired following heavy losses at Zeebrugge, Keyes planned a return to Ostend with the intention of blocking the canal and consequently severing Bruges from the sea, closing the harbour and trapping the 18 U-boats and 25 destroyers present for months to come. Volunteers from among the force that had failed in April aided the planning with advice based on their experience on the previous operation. Among these volunteers were Lieutenant-Commander Henry Hardy of HMS Sirius, Commander Alfred Godsal, former captain of HMS Brilliant, and Brilliant's first lieutenant Victor Crutchley. These officers approached Commodore Hubert Lynes and Admiral Roger Keyes with a refined plan for a second attempt to block the port. Other officers came forward to participate and Keyes and Lynes devised an operational plan to attack the canal mouth at Ostend once again.

Two obsolete cruisers—the aged HMS Sappho and the battered veteran of Zeebrugge, HMS Vindictive—were fitted out for the operation by having their non-essential equipment stripped out, their essential equipment reinforced and picked crews selected from volunteers. The ships' forward ballast tanks were filled with concrete to both protect their bows during the attack, and act as a more lasting obstacle once sunk. Vindictive was commanded by Godsal; her six officers and 48 crew were all volunteer veterans of the previous failed attempt by Brilliant. The two sacrificial cruisers were, as with the previous attack, accompanied by four heavy monitors under Keyes' command, eight destroyers under Lynes in HMS Faulknor and five motor launches. Like the blockships, the launches were all crewed by volunteers; mostly veterans of previous operations against the Belgian ports.

The plan was similar to the failed operation of three weeks previously. Weather dependent, under cover of a smoke screen, aerial bombardment and offshore artillery, the blockships would steam directly into the channel, turn sideways and scuttle themselves. Their advance would be covered by artillery fire against German shore positions from the heavy monitors at distance and at closer range by gunfire from the destroyers. This cover was vital because Ostend was protected by a very strong 11 in (280 mm) gun position known as the Tirpitz battery, named for the admiral. Once the operation had been concluded, the motor launches would draw along the seaward side of the blockships, remove the surviving crews and take them to the monitors for passage back to Britain. This operation was to thoroughly block the channel, and—coupled with the blockage at Zeebrugge (which the British authorities believed to be fully closed)—was to prevent use of Bruges by German raiding craft for months to come.

== Attack on Ostend ==
All preparations for the operation were completed by the first week of May and on 9 May the weather was nearly perfect for the attack. The British armada had collected at Dunkirk in Allied-held France and departed port shortly after dark. Two minutes after midnight, the force suffered a setback when Sappho suffered a minor boiler explosion and had to return to Dunkirk, unable to complete the journey. Torpedoes fired from motor launches demolished machine gun posts on the ends of the piers marking the canal, beginning the attack. Ten heavy bombers of the newly formed Royal Air Force then dropped incendiary bombs on German positions, but did not cause significant damage. In spite of the fog, air operations continued as planned under the overall direction of Brigadier-General Charles Lambe. At the same time as the aerial bombardment began, the long range artillery of the Royal Marine Artillery opened fire on Ostend from Allied positions around the Belgian town of Ypres.

"The star-shells paled and were lost as they sank in it; the beams of the searchlights seemed to break off short upon its front. It blinded the observers of the great batteries when suddenly, upon the warning of the explosions, the guns roared into action. It was then that those on the destroyers became aware that what had seemed to be merely smoke was wet and cold, that the rigging was beginning to drip, that there were no longer any stars—a sea-fog had come on."
British Admiralty statement on the Ostend Raid, 11 May 1918

In preparation for the attack, Godsal and Lynes had carefully consulted available charts of Ostend following the previous operation's failure caused by German repositioning of navigation buoys. This careful study was, however, rendered worthless by a sudden fog which obliterated all sight of the shore. Steaming back and forth across the harbour entrance in the fog as the monitors and German shore batteries engaged in a long range artillery duel over the lost cruiser, Godsal looked for the piers marking the entrance to the canal. As he searched, two German torpedo boats sailed from Ostend to intercept the cruiser, but in the heavy fog they collided and, disabled, limped back to shore. During this period, Godsal's motor launches lost track of the cruiser in the murk, and it was not until the third pass that Vindictive found the entrance, accompanied by only one of the launches. Heading straight into the mouth of the canal, guided by a flare dropped by the launch, Vindictive became an instant target of the German batteries and was badly damaged, the shellfire exacerbating the damage suffered in the earlier Zeebrugge Raid and seriously damaging Vindictive's port propeller.

Alfred Godsal intended to swing Vindictive broadside on into the channel mouth, but as he ordered the turn, the right screw broke down completely, preventing the cruiser from fully turning. Before this was realised on the cruiser's bridge, a shell fired from a gun battery on shore struck Commander Godsal directly, killing him instantly and shattering the bridge structure. Most of the bridge crew were killed or wounded by the blast, including First Lieutenant Victor Crutchley, who staggered to the wheel and attempted to force the ship to make the full turn into the channel. The damaged propeller made this maneuver impossible and the drifting cruiser floated out of the channel and became stuck on a sandbank outside, only partially obscuring the entranceway.

=== Evacuation of HMS Vindictive ===
"The engineer, who was the last to leave the engine-room, blew the main charges by the switch installed aft. Those on board felt the old ship shrug as the explosive tore the bottom plates and the bulkheads from her; she sank about six feet and lay upon the bottom of the channel. Her work was done."
British Admiralty statement

Realising that further manoeuvring would be pointless, Crutchley ordered the charges to be blown and the ship evacuated. As Engineer-Lieutenant William Bury prepared to detonate the scuttling charges, Crutchley took a survey of the ship and ordered all survivors to take to the boats on the seaward side of the wreck. As men scrambled down the ship's flank away from the shells and machine-gun bullets spitting from the harbour entrance, Crutchley made a final survey with an electric torch looking for wounded men among the dead on the decks. Satisfied that none alive remained aboard, he too leapt onto the deck of a motor launch bobbing below. The rescue mission itself, however, was not going as planned. Of the five motor launches attached to the expedition, only one had remained with the cruiser in the fog; ML254 commanded by Lieutenant Geoffrey Drummond. The launch—like the cruiser—was riddled with bullets; her commander was wounded and her executive officer dead. Despite her sheltered position behind the cruiser, fire from shore continued to enfilade the launch and a number of those aboard, including Lieutenant Bury, suffered broken ankles as they jumped onto the heaving deck.

ML254 then began slowly to leave the harbour mouth, carrying 38 survivors of Vindictive's 55 crewmen huddled on deck, where they remained exposed to machine gun fire from the shore. As Drummond turned his boat seawards and proceeded back to the offshore squadron that was still engaged in an artillery duel with the German defenders, one of the missing launches, ML276 passed her, having caught up with the lost cruiser at this late stage. Drummond called to ML276's commander—Lieutenant Rowley Bourke—that he believed there were still men in the water and Bourke immediately entered the harbour to search for them. Drummond's launch proceeded to the rendezvous with the destroyer HMS Warwick, overweighted and sinking, so severe was the damage she had suffered.

Hearing cries, Bourke entered the harbour but could not identify the lost men. Despite heavy machine gun and artillery fire, Bourke returned to the scene of the wreck four times before they discovered two sailors and Vindictive's badly wounded navigation officer Sir John Alleyne clinging to an upturned boat. Hauling the men aboard, Bourke turned for the safety of the open sea, but as he did, two 6 in (150 mm) shells struck the launch, smashing the lifeboat and destroying the compressed air tanks. This stalled the engines and caused a wave of highly corrosive acid to wash over the deck, causing severe damage to the launch's hull and almost suffocating the unconscious Alleyne. Under heavy fire, the boat staggered out of the harbour and was taken under tow by another late-arriving motor launch. After the operation, Bourke's launch was discovered to have 55 bullet and shrapnel holes.

Offshore, as Warwick's officers, Keyes' staff and the survivors of Vindictive gathered on the destroyer's deck to discuss the operation, an enormous explosion rocked the ship causing her to list severely. Warwick had struck one of the defensive mines off Ostend and was now in danger of sinking herself. The destroyer HMS Velox was lashed alongside and survivors from Warwick, Vindictive and ML254 transferred across to the sound ship. This ragged ensemble did not reach Dover until early the following morning, with Warwick still afloat. British casualties were reported in the immediate aftermath as being eight dead, ten missing and 29 wounded. The missing were presumed killed. German losses were three killed and eight wounded.

== Aftermath ==
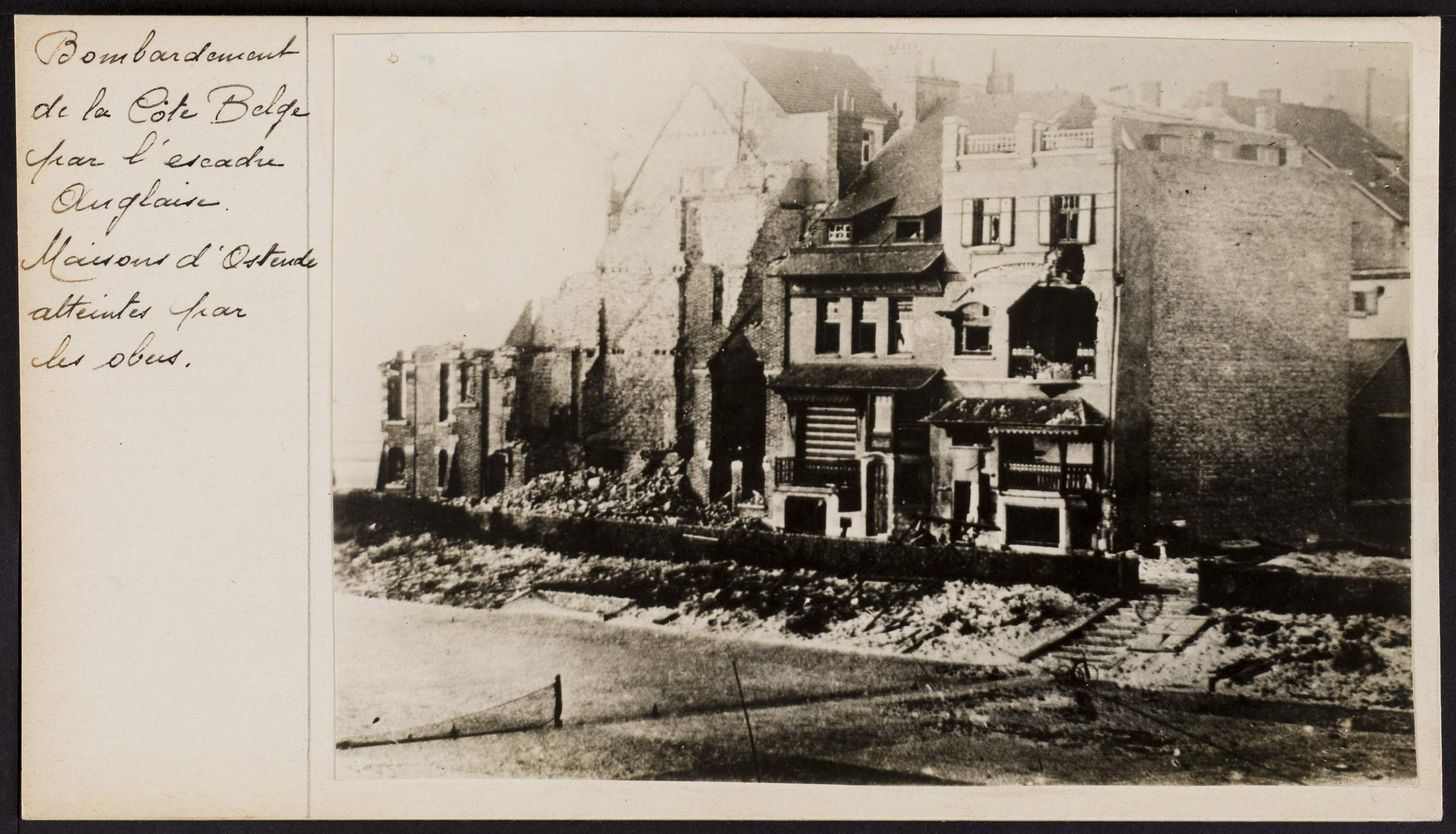
Houses in Ostend destroyed by Royal Navy gunfire

Despite German statements that the blockage did not impede their operations, the operation to close the Ostend canal was presented in Britain as partially successful. The channel was largely blocked and so Bruges was ostensibly closed off from the open sea, even if the position of the blockship meant that smaller ships still could get through. In fact, the entire operation had been rendered moot before it even began, due to events at the wider canal in Zeebrugge. British assessments of that operation had proven overly optimistic and the channel there had not been totally closed. Small coastal submarines of the UC class had been able to pass through the channel as early as the morning after the Zeebrugge Raid, and German naval engineers were able to dredge channels around the blockages at both ports over the coming weeks.

At Ostend, Vindictive did prevent larger warships passing through the channel, although smaller craft could still come and go. The larger warships in Bruges were trapped there for the remaining six months of the war; the town was captured by the Allies in October 1918. The Admiralty presented it as an example of careful planning by the Royal Navy, arguing that it provided a morale boost at one of the most critical moments of the war. Three Victoria Crosses were awarded to men involved. However, on a strategic scale the effects of the raids at Ostend and Zeebrugge on the Battle of the Atlantic were negligible. The blockages at Ostend and Zeebrugge took several years to clear completely, not being totally removed until 1921.
