= Thomas Garth (Royal Navy) =

Captain Thomas Garth (10 December 1787 – November 1841) was a British naval commander during the Napoleonic Wars. Garth, whose seat was Haines Hill at Hurst in Berkshire, was the son of Charles Garth MP for Devizes and the government agent for the colonial provinces of South Carolina, Georgia and Maryland.

He was also a nephew of General Thomas Garth, Colonel of the first dragoons and Principal Equerry to George III.

== Career ==
Garth became a naval commander on 3 March 1804 and was promoted to captain in January 1808. In June 1809 was given the command of the 38-gun frigate HMS Imperieuse, with which he subsequently sailed in an expedition against Antwerp. After the reduction of Flushing, Garth was engaged in various operations on the river Scheldt.

On 16 August 1809, whilst again in command of the Impérieuse, Garth in ascending the Scheldt after the other frigates, entered by mistake the Terneuse, instead of the Baerlandt channel, and became in consequence exposed to the fire of the Terneuse battery (located in Terneuzen, the Netherlands). In returning that fire, the frigate discharged from her carronades some shrapnel shells; one of which, bursting near the magazine of the fort, containing 3000 barrels of powder and a great quantity of cartridges, caused an explosion which killed 75 men. The battery fired no more, and the Impérieuse passed by.

In the spring of 1810, Thomas Garth was put under the orders of Sir George Cockburn who had been sent to Quiberon Bay to work with Baron De Kolli, who was trying to arrange the release of Ferdinand VII of Spain, held at Valençay. In November of that year, Garth took command of the 22-gun HMS Cossack, and later of the 32-gun HMS Cerberus. In Cerberus he captured various armed ships and merchantmen in the Mediterranean.

== Family ==
Garth married 1820, Charlotte Maitland, daughter of General Frederick Maitland. They had two daughters one of whom, Charlotte Harriet Garth married Philip William Godsal of Iscoyd Park in Flintshire. Garth was the grandfather of Philip Thomas Godsal, the author and inventor of the Godsal anti-tank rifle. His second daughter, Selina, married Frederick Lewis Scrymgeour Wedderburn. His only son, Thomas Colleton Garth, was the founder of the Garth Hunt in Berkshire.

Captain Garth died at Leamington, Warwickshire, in November 1841.
