= William Willy =

English politician

William Willy (1703? – 22 May 1765) was an English politician.

He was born the second son of George Willy, a mercer of New Park, Devizes, Wiltshire, with whom he started his career.

He was a member (MP) of the parliament of England for Devizes from 1747 to his death in 1765.

He died unmarried.
