= Charles de Lacy =

English painter

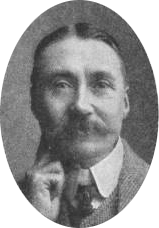
- Charles de Lacy in 1909, while contributing to The Illustrated London News
- Born: Charles John de Lacy; 1856; Sunderland, County Durham
- Died: 13 December 1929 (aged 73); Epsom, Surrey
- Education: The National Gallery
- Known for: Marine art

Charles John de Lacy (1856 – 13 December 1929) was one of the foremost British marine artists of his period. He was especially known for his warship imagery and was regularly commissioned by Elswick, Tyne and Wear shipbuilder W. G. Armstrong Whitworth.

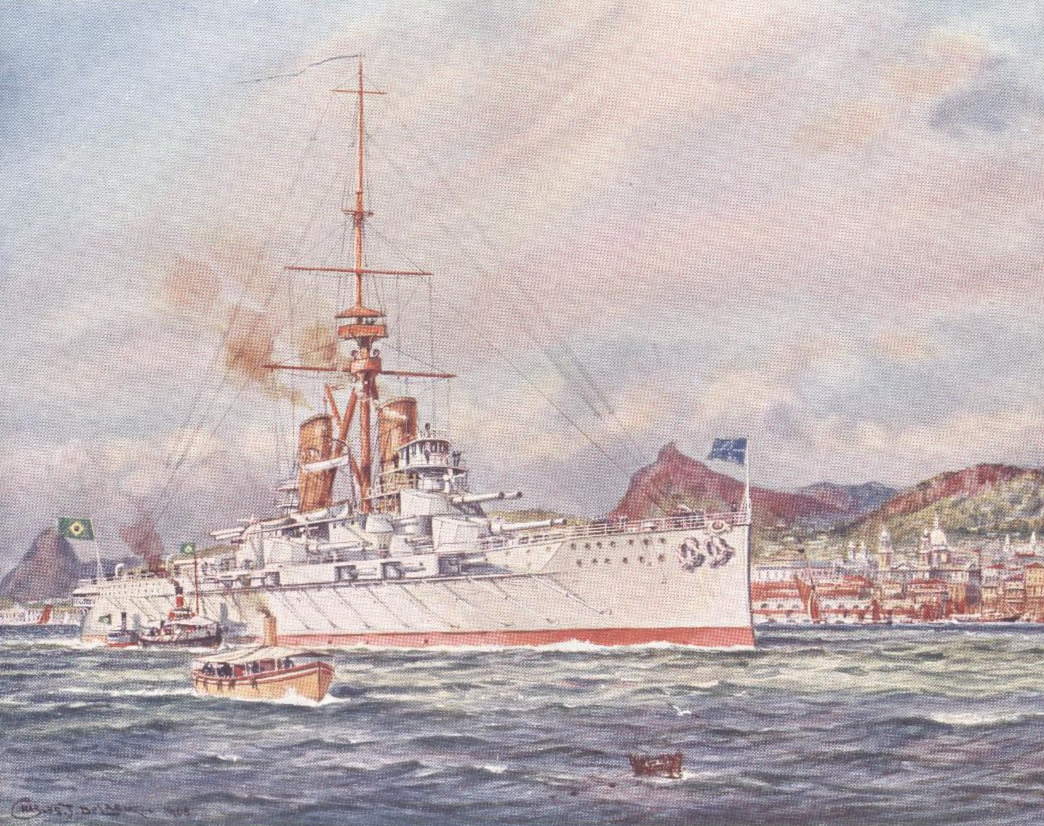
Minas Geraes (1908)

== Life ==
Son of Robert de Lacy, a professor of music, and his wife Eliza, Charles de Lacy was born in 1856 in Sunderland, County Durham, and grew up in the Bishopwearmouth area of the city. Although he would do much work in that area, by 1870 his family had relocated from the North East of England to Lambeth in London. While in Lambeth he married Alice Harriet Hill in 1880 and they had two daughters, Constance Rosamond De Lacy (b. 1881) and Irene Valerie Cristoforo De Lacy (b. 1901). In the matter of his death 1936 is often cited; however, the evidence suggests 1929 is correct. He died in Epsom, Surrey.

He first exhibited at the Royal Academy in 1889, having undertaken training at The National Gallery. Magazines such as The Illustrated London News were among early patrons.

Sources vary regarding the correct spelling of the surname: "de Lacy" or "de Lacey". Three of the cited sources say "de Lacy" (including Art UK). The Royal Museums at Greenwich (including the National Maritime Museum) use both forms. In the 1911 census entry in his own hand is written Charles John De Lacy and he says of himself "Artist, Painter and Press artist".

== Individual notable works ==
- The Battle Against the Spanish Armada
- The Kinfauns Castle as a Troopship (National Maritime Museum)
- HMS Vindictive Storming Zeebrugge Mole (during the Zeebrugge Raid) which hangs in the Britannia Royal Naval College.
- The Sinking of the Lusitania
- "The Funeral of queen Victoria" Porthmouth 1st February 1901

Much of his work was done as book illustration or as commercial art for shipbuilders. Amongst major publishing names who used his material were Frederick Warne & Co, Thomas Nelson, Cassell, Methuen Publishing and S.P.C.K.

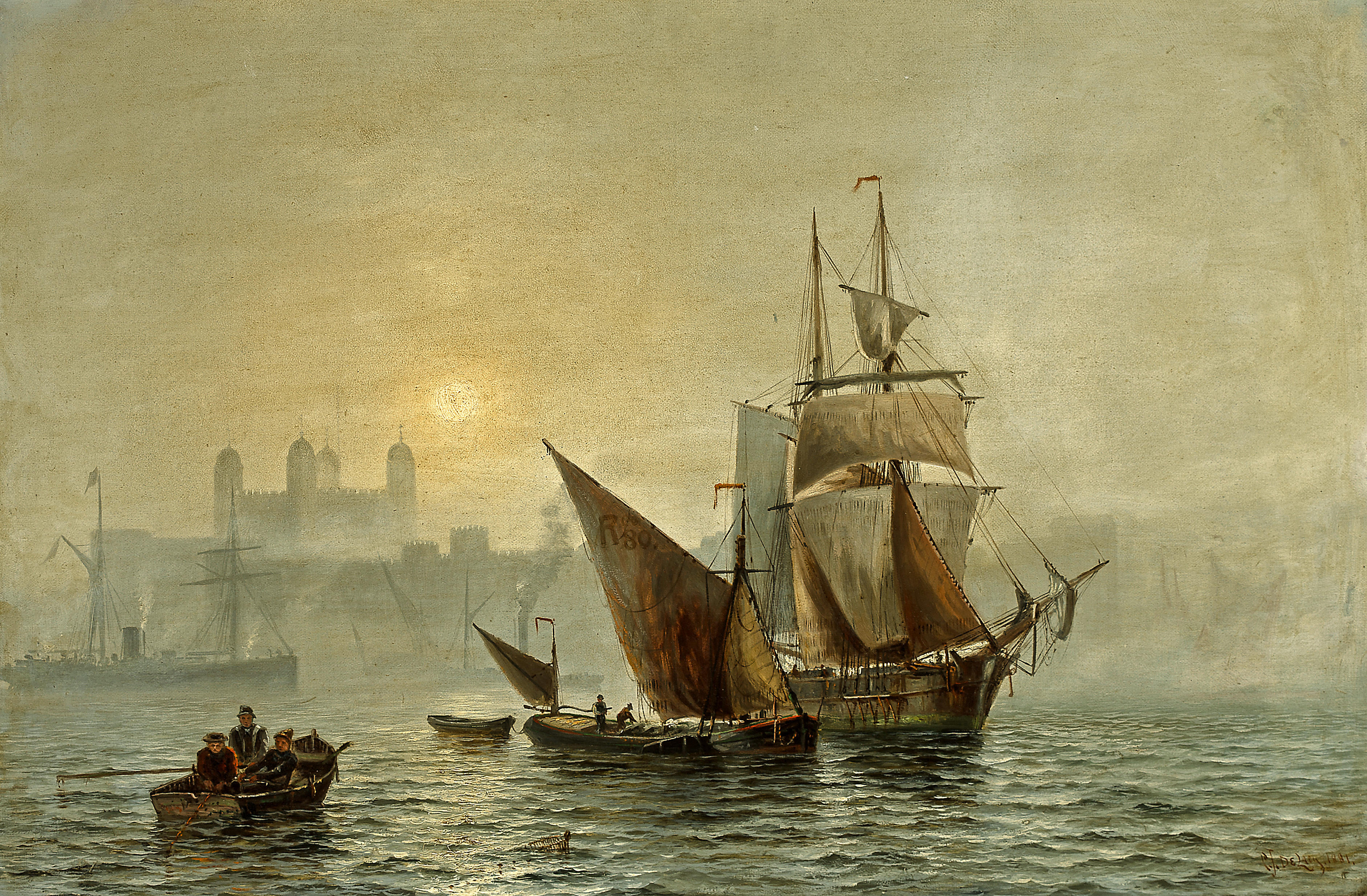
Mist in port, London (1881)

== Selected public collections holding de Lacy material ==
- The National Maritime Museum
- Tyne & Wear Archives & Museums
  - Archive item 450/1 (Note: Archive item 450/1 is a bound collection of W G Armstrong Whitworth printed launch ephemera. An example is Minas Geraes. Its subject is the Brazilian battleship Minas Geraes. Another example is a pair covering different HMS Invincibles.)
    - Brazilean scout (2 images)
    - HMS Invincible (2 images)
    - Brazilian battleship Minas Geraes (2 images)
    - Argentine gunboat Parana
    - Argentine armoured gunboat Rosario
    - HMS Superb (3 images)
  - Archive item 696/7/15 (Note: Elswick 1911 has been used as the cover of Armstrong's River Empire. Archives item 696/7/15 which also contains a De Lacy of the Chinese Chao Ho.)
    - Elswick 1911
    - Chao Ho
- Russell-Cotes Art Gallery & Museum
- Cowes Maritime Museum
