= Thomas Garth (British Army officer) =

British Army general

General Thomas Garth
- Born: 1744
- Died: 18 November 1829 (aged 84–85)
- Military career
- Allegiance: United Kingdom
- Branch: British Army
- Rank: General
- Unit: 1st Dragoons
- Conflicts: Seven Years' War; French Revolutionary Wars

General Thomas Garth (1744 – 18 November 1829) was a British Army officer and chief equerry to George III.

== Military career ==
Garth was the son of John Garth (1701–1764), Recorder and MP for Devizes, and Rebecca, daughter of John Brompton and granddaughter of Sir Richard Raynsford, Lord Chief Justice of the King's Bench. He entered the army as a cornet in the 1st Dragoons in 1762. He saw action in Germany in 1762 during the Seven Years' War. He was promoted to lieutenant in 1765, to captain in 1775 and to major in 1792.

Promoted to lieutenant colonel in 1794, he took part in the Flanders Campaign that year. he was appointed an equerry to George III in 1795. Garth rented Ilsington House at Puddletown, which was often visited by the royal family en route for Weymouth. He was further promoted to major-general on 1 January 1798, to lieutenant general on 1 January 1805 and to full general on 4 June 1814. He served as colonel of the 1st Dragoons from 1801 until his death.

Garth was the father of Thomas (Tommy) Garth of the 15th Hussars (1800–1873), who it is believed was the illegitimate son of Princess Sophia (1777–1848), George III and Queen Charlotte's fifth daughter.

General Garth was appointed by the Prince Regent as guardian to his daughter and heiress, Princess Charlotte Augusta of Wales, during the months prior to her marriage to Prince Leopold of Saxe-Coburg-Saalfeld (later King of the Belgians). For this service, Garth was presented with a silver salver by the Prince.

General Garth died on 18 November 1829. He left his house, 32 Grosvenor Place, Mayfair, to Tommy Garth. He named his residuary legatee as his nephew, Captain Thomas Garth RN (1781–1841) of Haines Hill, Berkshire, the son of General Garth's older brother, Charles (1734–1784) who was an MP and Government Agent for South Carolina, Georgia and Maryland. Another brother, George Garth (abt 1733–1819) was a British General in American Revolutionary War, and Colonel of the 17th Regiment of Foot.

Military offices
Preceded by Philip Goldsworthy	Colonel of the 1st (Royal) Regiment of Dragoons; 1801–1829	Succeeded by Lord Edward Somerset
