= HMS Brilliant (1891) =

Apollo-class cruiser of the British Royal Navy

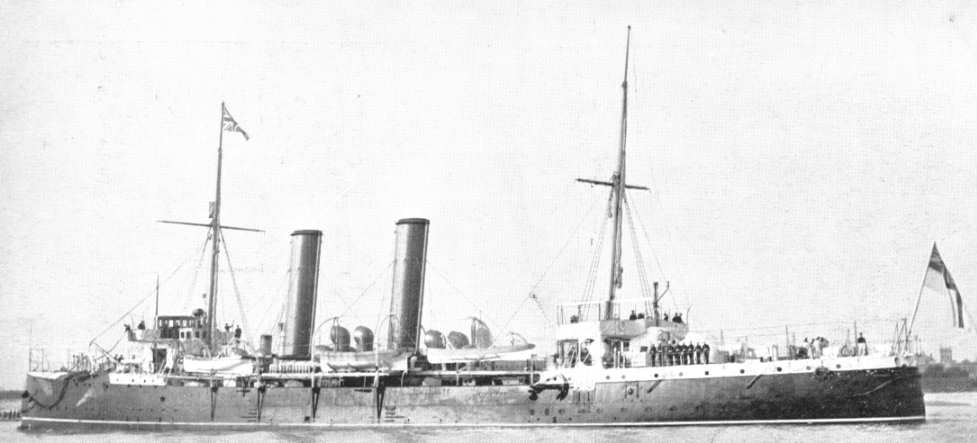

History

United Kingdom
- Name: HMS Brilliant
- Builder: Sheerness Dockyard
- Laid down: 1890
- Launched: 24 June 1891
- Commissioned: 1893
- Honours and awards: ZEEBRUGGE AND OSTEND 1918
- Fate: Scuttled as blockship, 23 April 1918
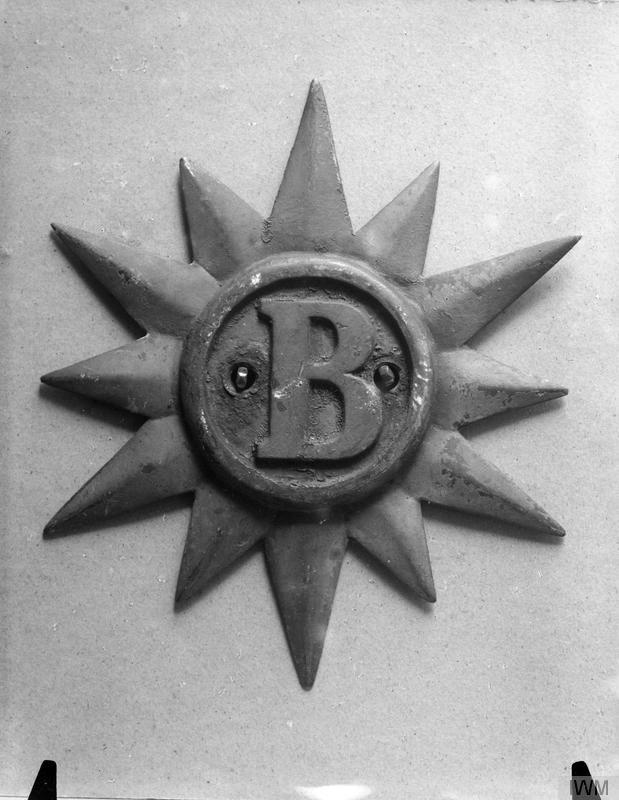
- Badge: Ship's badge of HMS Brilliant (IWM Q20182)

General characteristics
- Class & type: Apollo-class cruiser
- Displacement: 3,600 tons
- Length: 314 ft (95.7 m)
- Beam: 43.5 ft (13.3 m)
- Draught: 17.5 ft (5.3 m)
- Speed: 19.75 knots (36.58 km/h)
- Complement: 273 to 300 (Officers and Men)
- Armament: 2 × QF 6-inch (152.4 mm) guns; 6 × QF 4.7-inch (120 mm) guns; 8 × 6-pounders; 2 to 4 × 14 inch torpedo tubes

HMS Brilliant was an Apollo-class cruiser of the British Royal Navy which served from 1893 to 1918 in various colonial posts and off the British Isles during the First World War.

== Operational history ==
Brilliant arrived at Portsmouth from Chatham Dockyard in March 1900, and was placed in the Fleet reserve.

She was commissioned at Portsmouth on 1 October 1901 by Captain Hugh Pigot Williams, for service with the Cruiser Squadron. In May 1902 she was taken into Portsmouth for a refit, and on 16 August that year she took part in the fleet review held at Spithead for the coronation of King Edward VII. The following month she visited the Aegean Sea with other ships of her squadron for combined manoeuvres with the Mediterranean Fleet, returning to Portsmouth in October. Late that year she was ordered back to Gibraltar for temporary service in the Mediterranean to protect British interests in Morocco, and in early February 1903 visited Las Palmas.

=== First World War ===
On 23 October 1914, Brilliant, together with sister ship Sirius, and several sloops and destroyers, shelled German troops on the Belgian coast. On 28 October, Brilliant was on similar duty when she was hit by German return fire, killing one of her crew and wounding several more. On 11 November 1914 the torpedo-gunboat Niger was torpedoed and sunk in the Downs by the German submarine U-12. As a result, as Dover was not considered secure against submarine attack, Admiral Horace Hood, commander of the Dover Patrol and senior officer at the port of Dover, ordered Brilliant and Sirius to Sheerness to avoid the submarine hazard. While based at Sheerness, Brilliant and Sirius served as guardships against possible German attack.

In June 1915, Brilliant served as guardship on the Tyne. On the night of 15/16 June 1915, the German airship L10 attacked targets on the Tyne, bombing Jarrow, Wallsend and South Shields. 18 were killed and 72 wounded by L10's bombs. Brilliant fired at L10 but the German airship was undamaged.

In July 1917 Brilliant was based at Lerwick in Shetland as a depot ship for the trawlers and patrol boats of the Auxiliary Patrol.

== Wreck ==
In April 1918, Brilliant was deliberately scuttled in the mouth of Ostend harbour in Belgium during the failed First Ostend Raid. This operation was intended to block the harbour mouth and prevent the transit of German U-boats and other raiding craft from Bruges to the North Sea. German countermeasures were, however, too effective, and Brilliant and fellow blockship HMS Sirius were eventually destroyed by their crews outside the harbour mouth after running aground on a sandbank. The wrecks were broken up postwar.

== Publications ==
- Cole, Christopher; Cheesman, E. F. (1984). The Air Defence of Britain 1914–1918. London: Putnam. ISBN 0-370-30538-8.
- Colledge, J. J.; Warlow, Ben (2006) [1969]. Ships of the Royal Navy: The Complete Record of All Fighting Ships of the Royal Navy from the 15th Century to the Present (3rd Rev ed.). London: Chatham Publishing. ISBN 978-1-86176-281-8. OCLC 67375475.
- Corbett, Julian S. (1920). Naval Operations: From the Outbreak of War to the Battle of the Falklands December 1914. History of the Great War. Vol. I. London: Longmans, Green and Co.
- Gardiner, Robert; Gray, Randal, eds. (1985). Conway's All The World's Fighting Ships 1906–1921. London: Conway Maritime Press. ISBN 0-85177-245-5.
- Monograph No. 28: Home Waters Part III: From November 1914 to the end of January 1915 (PDF). Naval Staff Monographs (Historical). Vol. XII. Naval Staff, Training and Staff Duties Division. 1925.
- Monograph No. 29: Home Waters Part IV: From February 1915 to July 1915 (PDF). Naval Staff Monographs (Historical). Vol. XIII. Naval Staff, Training and Staff Duties Division. 1925.
- Monograph No. 35: Home Waters Part IX: 1st May 1917 to 31st July 1917 (PDF). Naval Staff Monographs (Historical). Vol. XIX. Naval Staff, Training and Staff Duties Division. 1939.
