= HMS Vindictive (1897) =

Arrogant-class cruiser

Coordinates: 51.2393734°N 2.9256020°E

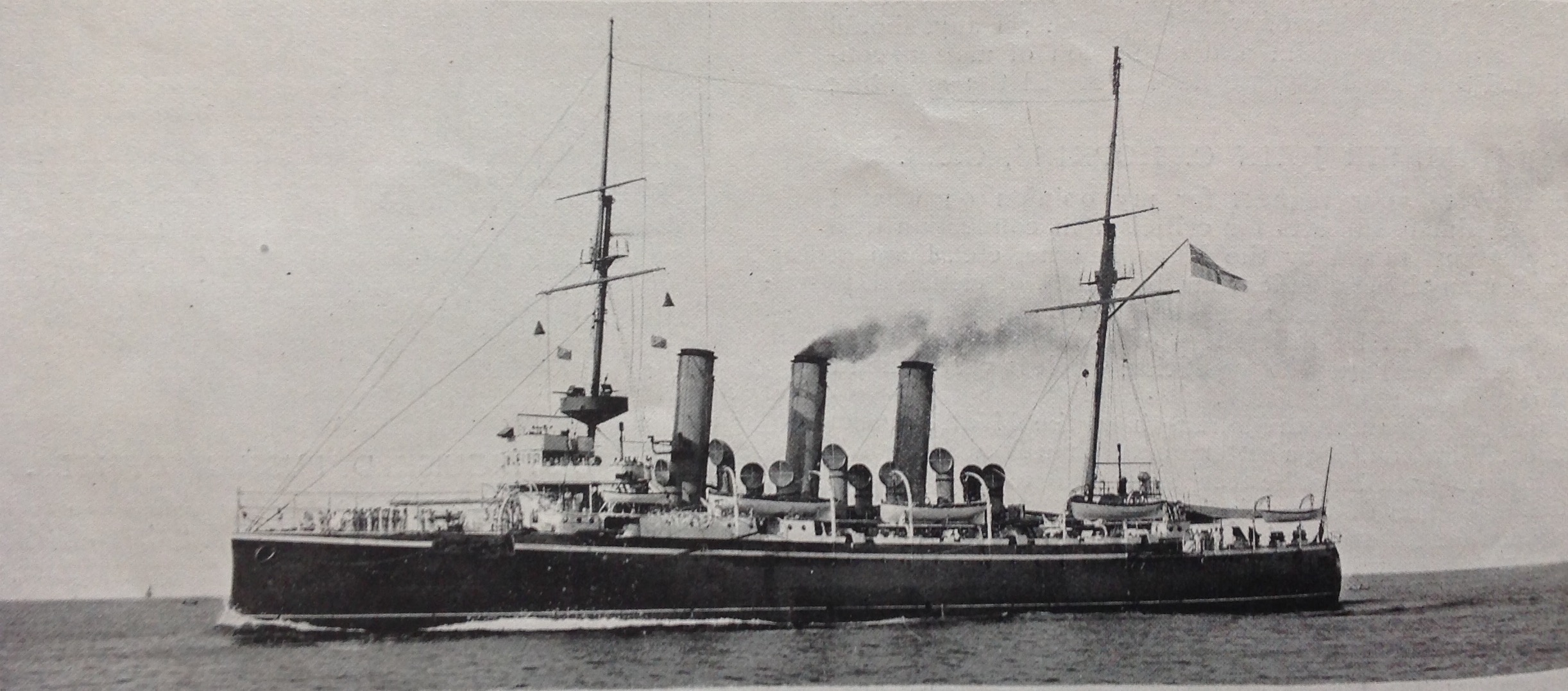
- HMS Vindictive in 1900

History

United Kingdom
- Name: HMS Vindictive
- Builder: Chatham Dockyard
- Launched: 9 December 1897
- Commissioned: 1899
- Fate: Expended as blockship, 10 May 1918; Scrapped in 1920. Bow preserved as a memorial

General characteristics
- Class & type: Arrogant-class cruiser
- Displacement: 5,750 tons
- Length: 342 ft (104 m)
- Beam: 57 ft 6 in (17.53 m)
- Propulsion: Triple-expansion engines, 2 screws, 10,000 hp (7,457 kW)
- Speed: 19 knots (35 km/h; 22 mph)
- Complement: 480
- Armament: 4 × QF 6 inch /40 naval guns; 6 × QF 4.7-inch (120 mm) guns; All 6- and 4.7-inch guns later replaced by 10 × BL 6-inch Mk VII naval guns; 8 × 12-pounder guns; 3 × QF 3-pounder guns; 5 × machine guns; 3 × 18-inch (450 mm) torpedo tubes; Zeebrugge Raid configuration; 4 × BL 6-inch Mk VII naval guns; 1 x 11-inch howitzer; 2 x 7.5-inch howitzers; 2 x static flamethrowers; 8 x 1^{1}/_{2}-pounder 'pom poms'; 16 x Lewis guns; 16 x Stokes mortars
- Armour: Deck : 3 in (76 mm)

HMS Vindictive was a British Arrogant-class cruiser built at Chatham Dockyard. She was launched on 9 December 1897 and completed in 1899. The vessel participated in the Zeebrugge Raid.

== Service history ==
Vindictive served with the Mediterranean Squadron from 1900. Attached to the cruiser division, she visited Larnaka in June 1902, and took part in combined manoeuvres between the Mediterranean and Channel fleets in the Aegean Sea and off Argostoli in September and October that year.

She was refitted in 1909–10 for service in the 3rd Division of the Home Fleet. In March 1912 she became a tender to the training establishment HMS Vernon. Obsolescent by the outbreak of First World War, in August 1914 she was assigned to the 9th Cruiser Squadron and captured the German merchantmen Schlesien and Slawentzitz on 7 August and 8 September respectively. In 1915 she was stationed on the southeast coast of South America. From 1916 to late 1917 she served in the White Sea.

=== Zeebrugge Raid ===
Early in 1918 she was fitted out for the Zeebrugge Raid.

For the purpose of attacking the mole, the Vindictive was fitted with supplementary armament of three howitzers, an 11-inch on the quarterdeck, a 7.5-inch on the forecastle, with a second 7.5 on the superstructure abaft the third funnel. Sixteen Stokes mortars were mounted in batteries of four, one battery being on the port side of the forecastle, another on the port side of the shelterdeck abaft the bridge, a third near the after bridge on the ‘skid-beam-deck’ (which was built over the ‘skid-beams’ on the port side), and a fourth on the quarterdeck. The same number of Lewis guns was carried, of which 10 were on the skid beam deck and 6 in the foretop. The former 10 were landed and used on the mole after first being used in the ship. Four of the 6-inch guns were retained from the ship's former main armament. A total of eight 1½ pounder ‘pom poms’ were mounted in the new configuration. Besides the aforementioned armament of guns, mortars, and machine guns, to clear the mole for the storming parties, Morris static flamethrowers were carried in two huts constructed on the port side of the ship, abreast of the bridges.

Access to the mole for the storming parties was gained by hinged "brows" (i.e. gangways) 30 feet long. Ten brows were slung from poles, while eight more, made to collapse in the middle for convenient stowage, were carried further aft on the skid beam deck, to be held in reserve. Given that the skid beams formerly carried the boats, only two of the original boats were left in the ship, the 32-foot and the 30-foot sailing cutters.

The ship’s port side was protected from collision with the mole by bundles of hazel-rod fenders. The Vindictive was to be pushed and held alongside the mole by HMS Iris II and HMS Daffodil, which were assigned this task. The heavy warps for securing them are shown coiled on the upper deck on the starboard side.

On 23 April 1918 she was in fierce action at Zeebrugge when she went alongside the mole, and her upperworks were badly damaged by gunfire; her captain, Alfred Carpenter, was awarded a Victoria Cross for his actions during the raid. This event was famously painted by Charles de Lacy; the painting hangs in the Britannia Royal Naval College. In addition to her usual complement, she embarked Royal Marine gunners to man the supplementary armament, and a larger raiding party. This comprised two of the three infantry companies of the 4th Battalion, Royal Marine Light Infantry, (their third company was embarked on Iris), along with two "companies" of seamen raiders commanded by Lieutenant Commander Bryan Fullerton Adams and Lieutenant Arthur Chamberlain ("A" & "B" seamen Companies) respectively.

=== Ostend raid ===
She was sunk as a blockship at Ostend during the Second Ostend Raid on 10 May 1918. HM Motor Launch 254 picked up 38 survivors of Vindictive's 55 crewmen. The ship's commander, Alfred Godsal, perished on board. The wreck was raised on 16 August 1920 and subsequently broken up. The bow section has been preserved in Ostend harbour serving as a memorial. One of Vindictive's 7.5-inch howitzers was acquired and preserved by the Imperial War Museum.

The Zeebrugge and Ostend Raids, with their associated crop of VCs, had given the ship late celebrity and her name was perpetuated by renaming the aircraft carrier HMS Cavendish, which was under construction, HMS Vindictive.

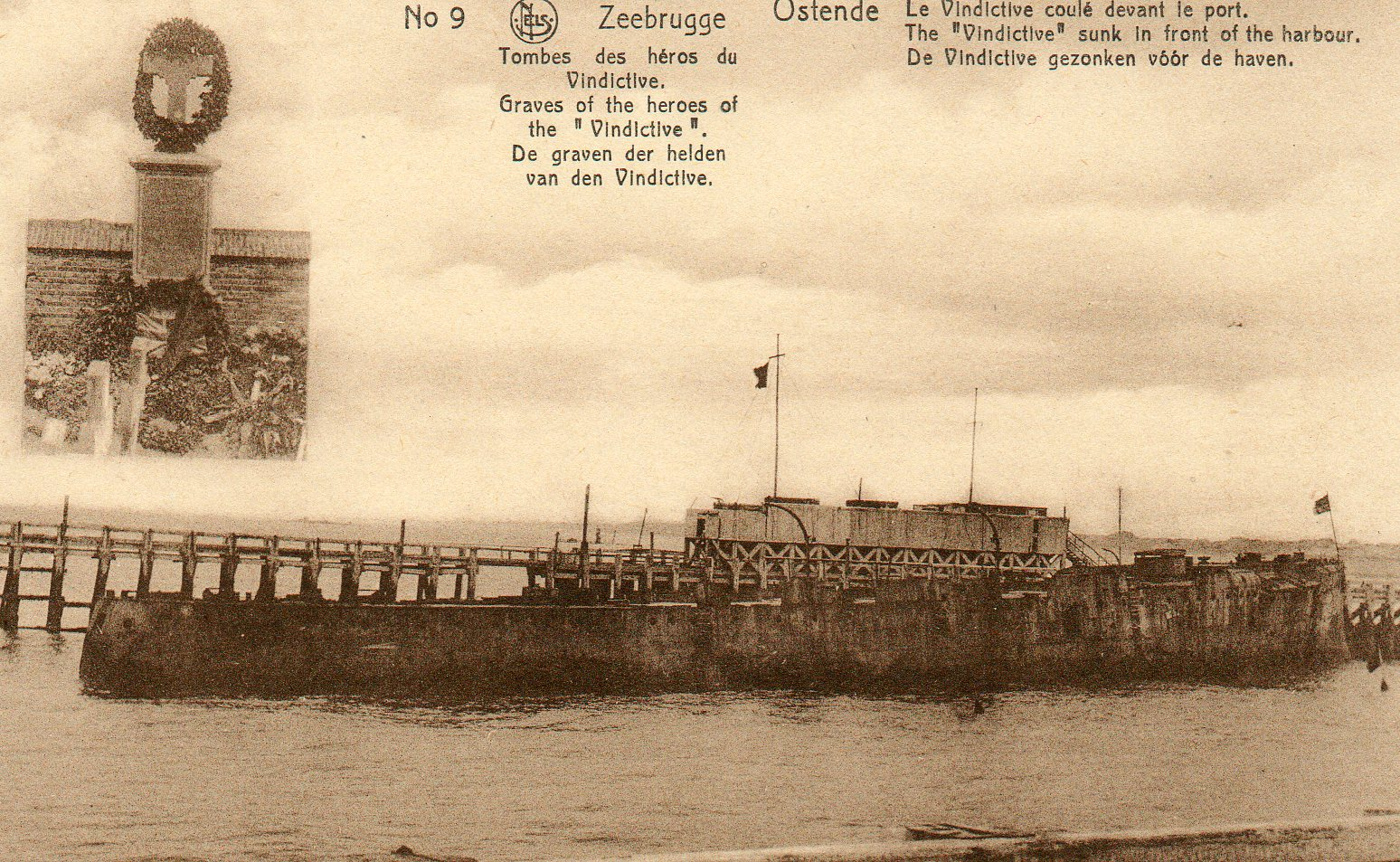
HMS Vindictive sunk after the Second Ostend Raid

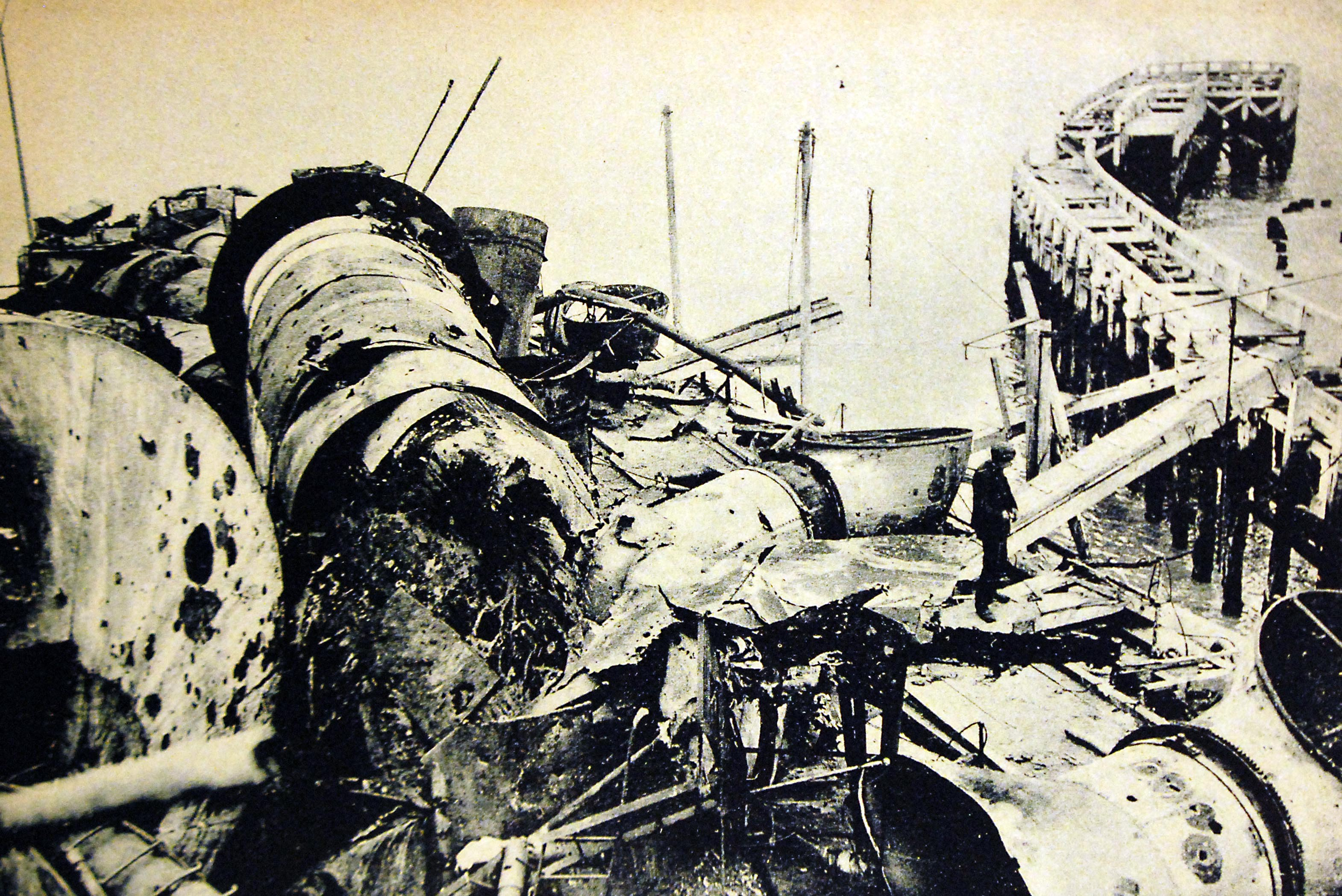
Vindictive's damaged superstructure

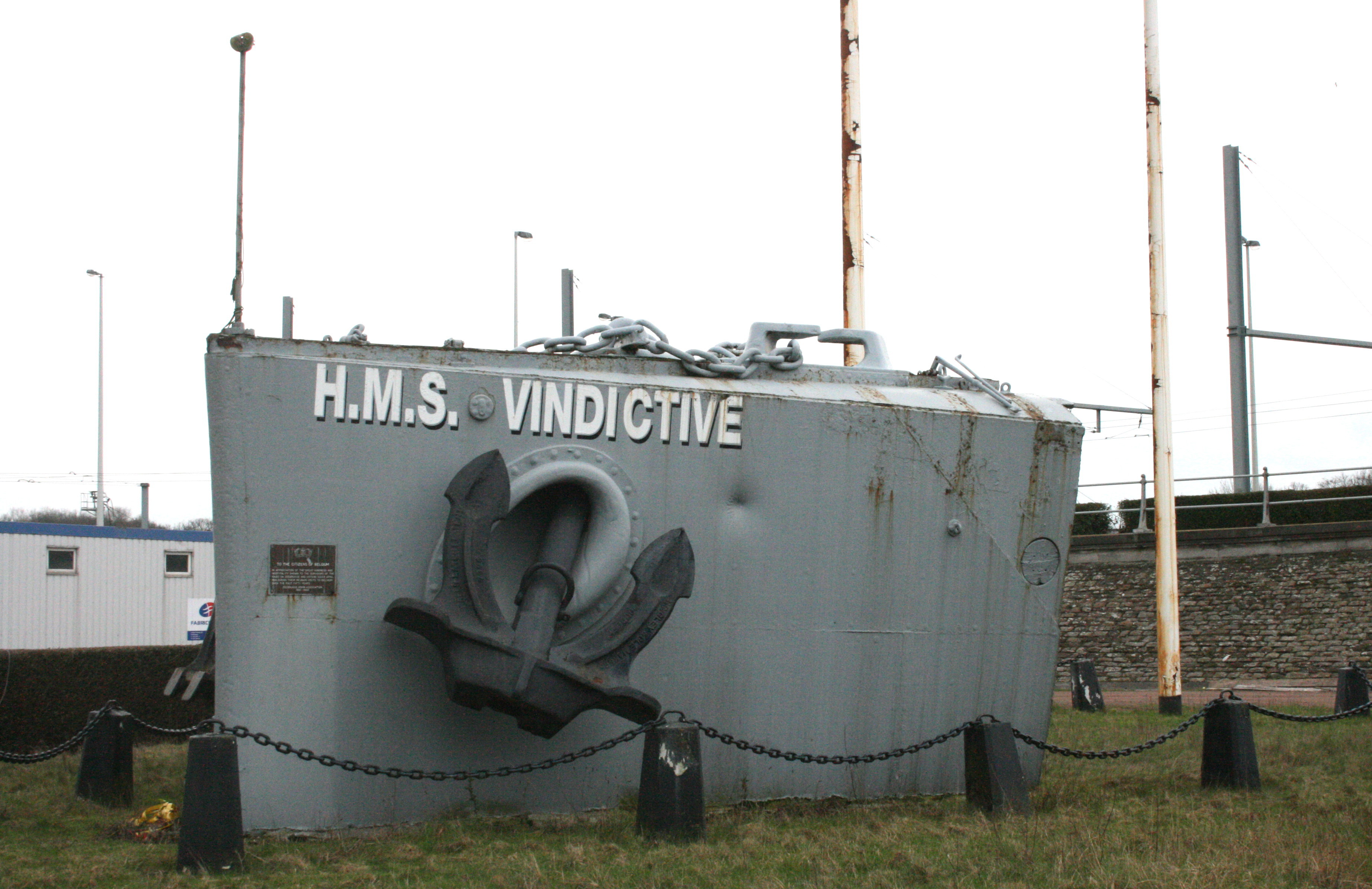
HMS Vindictive memorial in Ostend at its original location

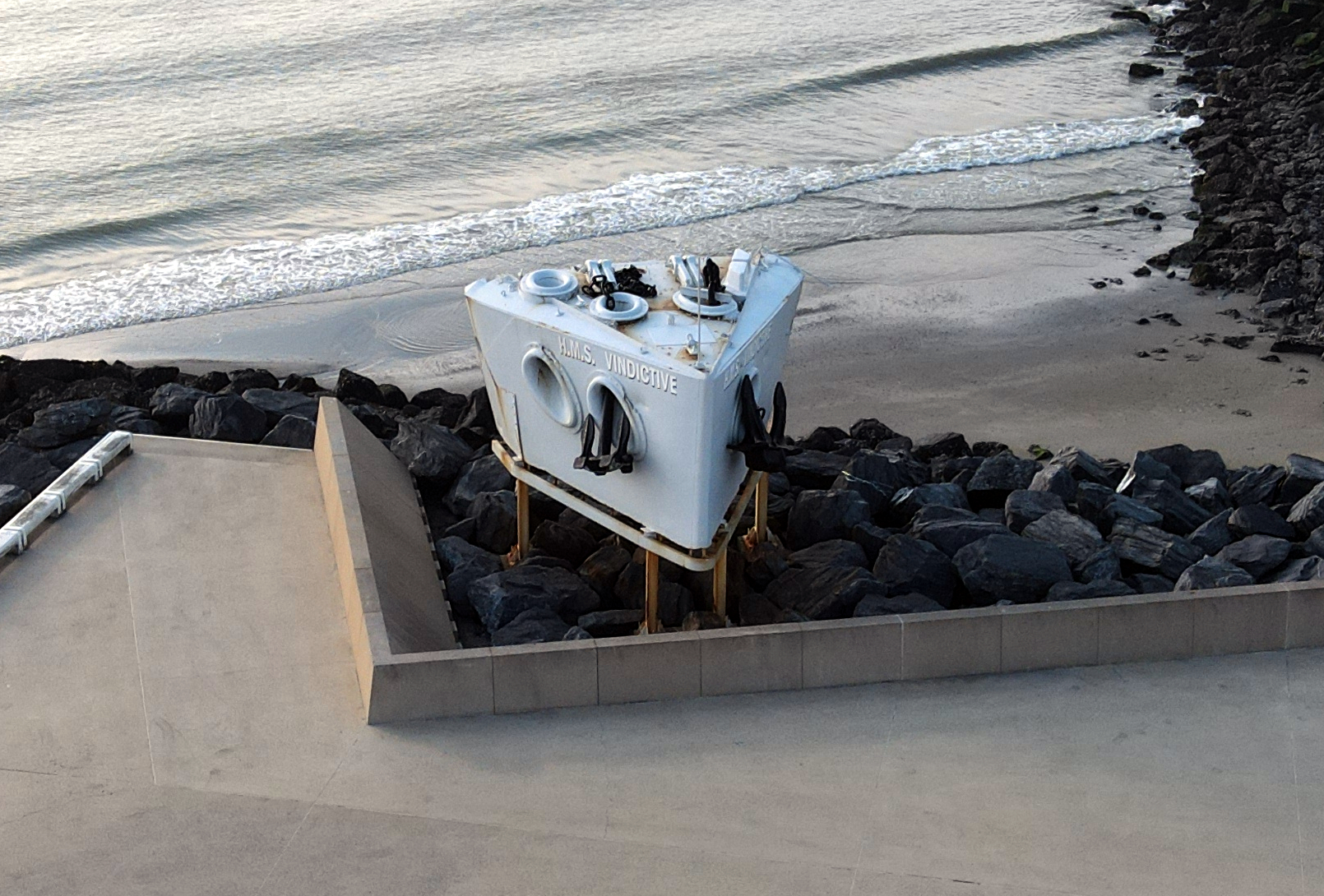
HMS Vindictive memorial in Ostend at its new location

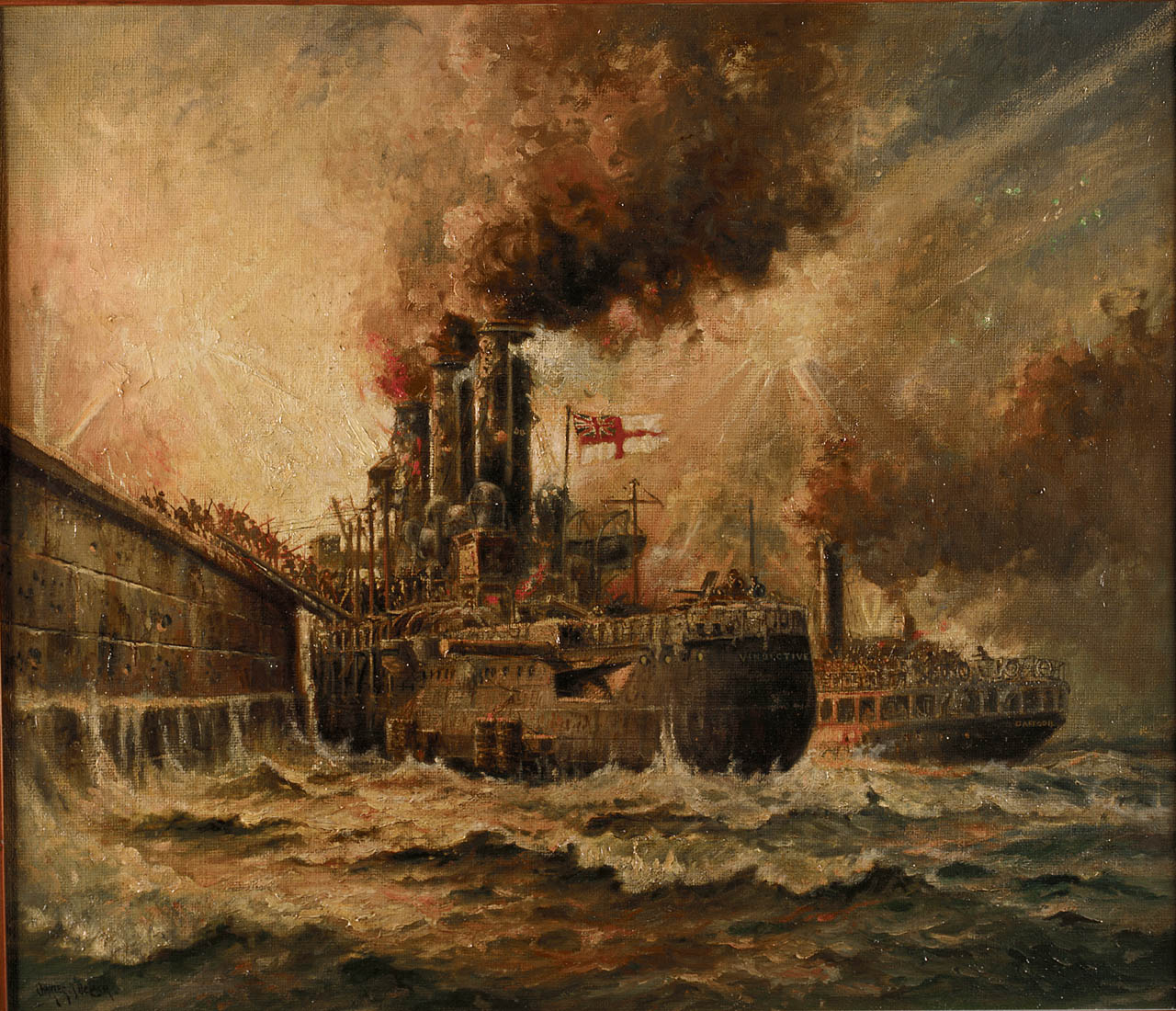
Charles John De Lacy - HMS 'Vindictive' at Zeebrugge, 23 April 1918

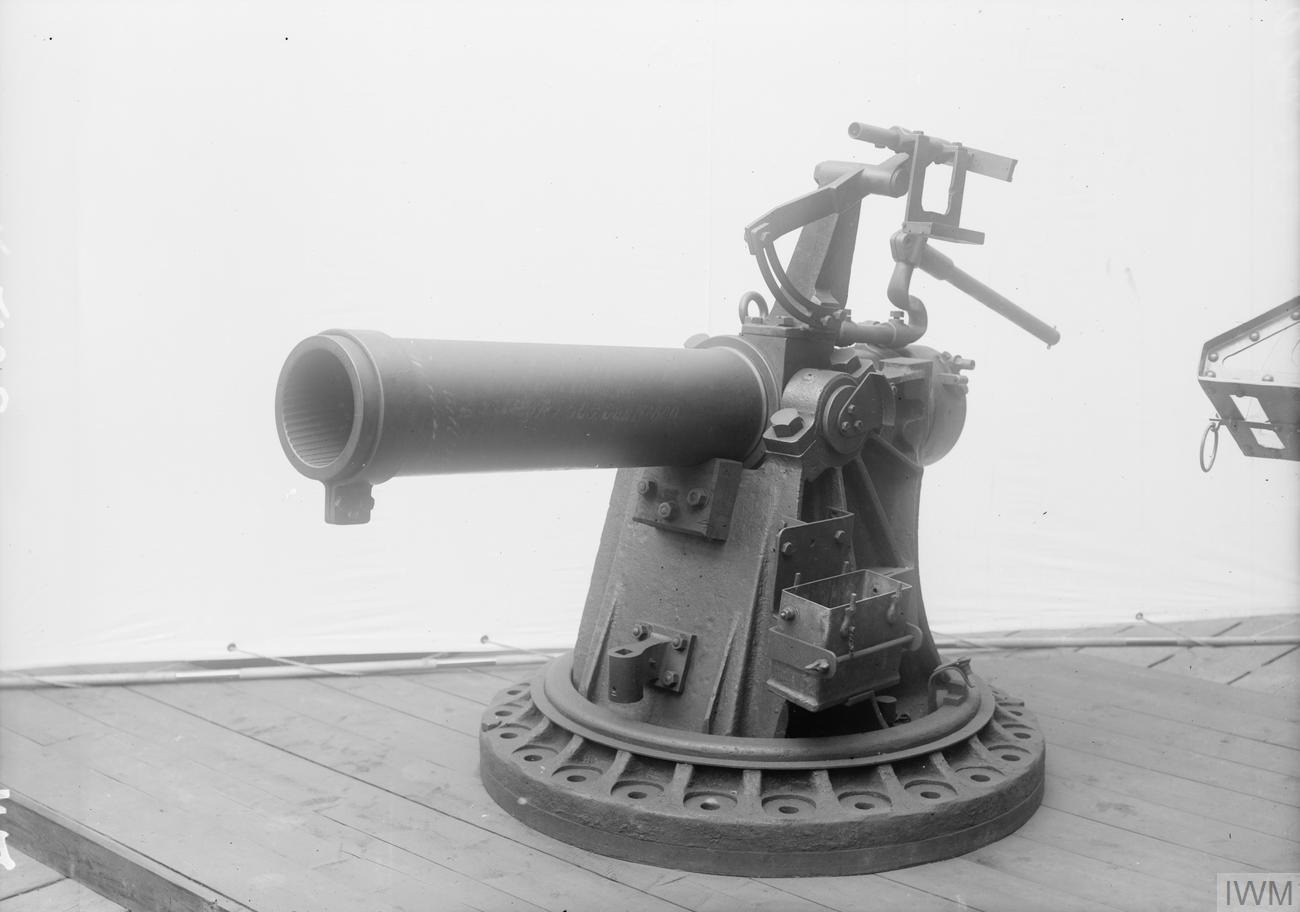
7.5-inch howitzer, fitted to HMS Vindictive for the Zeebrugge Raid

== Publications ==
- Colledge, J. J.; Warlow, Ben (2006) [1969]. Ships of the Royal Navy: The Complete Record of All Fighting Ships of the Royal Navy from the 15th Century to the Present (3rd Rev ed.). London: Chatham Publishing. ISBN 978-1-86176-281-8. OCLC 67375475.
- Roach, Alastair (29 January 2018). "A Model of HMS Vindictive as Fitted for the Zeebrugge Raid, 1918". The Mariner's Mirror. 104 (1): 27–39. doi:10.1080/00253359.2018.1411097.
