= Ranken dart =

Anti-zeppelin weapon

Ranken Dart
- Type: Anti-Zeppelin weapon
- Place of origin: UK

Service history
- In service: February 1916
- Used by: Royal Naval Air Service, Royal Flying Corps
- Wars: World War I

Production history
- Designer: Engineer Lieutenant Commander Francis Ranken

Specifications
- Mass: 1 lb (450 g)
- Length: 13 inches (330 mm)
- Width: 5.9 inches (150 mm)
- Rate of fire: Could be dropped individually or all at once (in packs of 24)
- Warhead: High explosive, black powder, phosphorus
- Detonation mechanism: Ignited upon penetration of airship skin
- Armour: Steel and wood construction
- Launch platform: Aircraft

The Ranken Dart was an anti-Zeppelin weapon developed during the First World War. It was an air-dropped 1-pound (450 g) explosive flechette-type of missile-shaped bomb which was 13 inches (330 mm) long and 5.9 inches (150 mm) wide while being of a steel and wood construction.

It was developed for use against German Zeppelin airships by Engineer Lieutenant Commander Francis Ranken, initially as a Royal Naval Air Service weapon but was also adopted by the Royal Flying Corps in 1916.

Usually carried in packs of 24; the darts could be dropped individually or all at once. Aircraft equipped with Ranken darts had to climb above their targets, before dropping them. It entered service in February 1916. Ranken Darts became obsolete with the advent of the combination of explosive Pomeroy bullets and incendiary ammunition fired from .303 Vickers and Lewis guns mounted on fighter aircraft.

== Design ==
The Ranken dart consisted of a tinplate tube 9.1 in (23 cm) long, with a cast iron pointed nose at one end, and a plug and three spring loaded arms at the other. The arms were kept closed in storage by a cap, either tin or rubber, which acted as a buffer when the dart was in its dropping tube. When released, the arms opened up and locked in place to act as a grapnel, thus ensuring that the body entered the fabric. The Dart contained high explosive, black powder and phosphorus which were ignited when the head penetrated the airship's outer skin.
