= Frank Arthur Brock =

Frank Arthur Brock, OBE
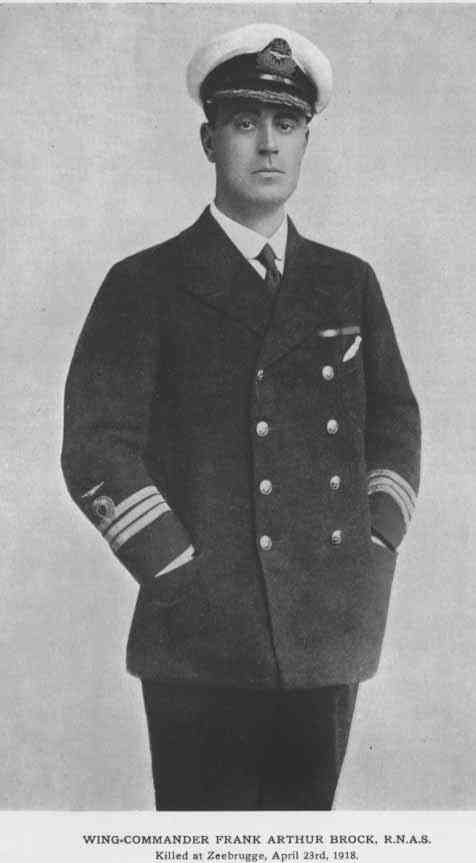
- Born: 29 June 1884; South Norwood, Surrey, England
- Died: 23 April 1918 (aged 33); Zeebrugge Port, Belgium
- Military career
- Allegiance: United Kingdom of Great Britain and Ireland
- Branch: Royal Naval Air Service; Royal Air Force
- Service years: 1914–1918
- Rank: Wing Commander
- Conflicts: World War I; Zeebrugge Raid †
- Awards: Order of the British Empire; Mentioned in dispatches

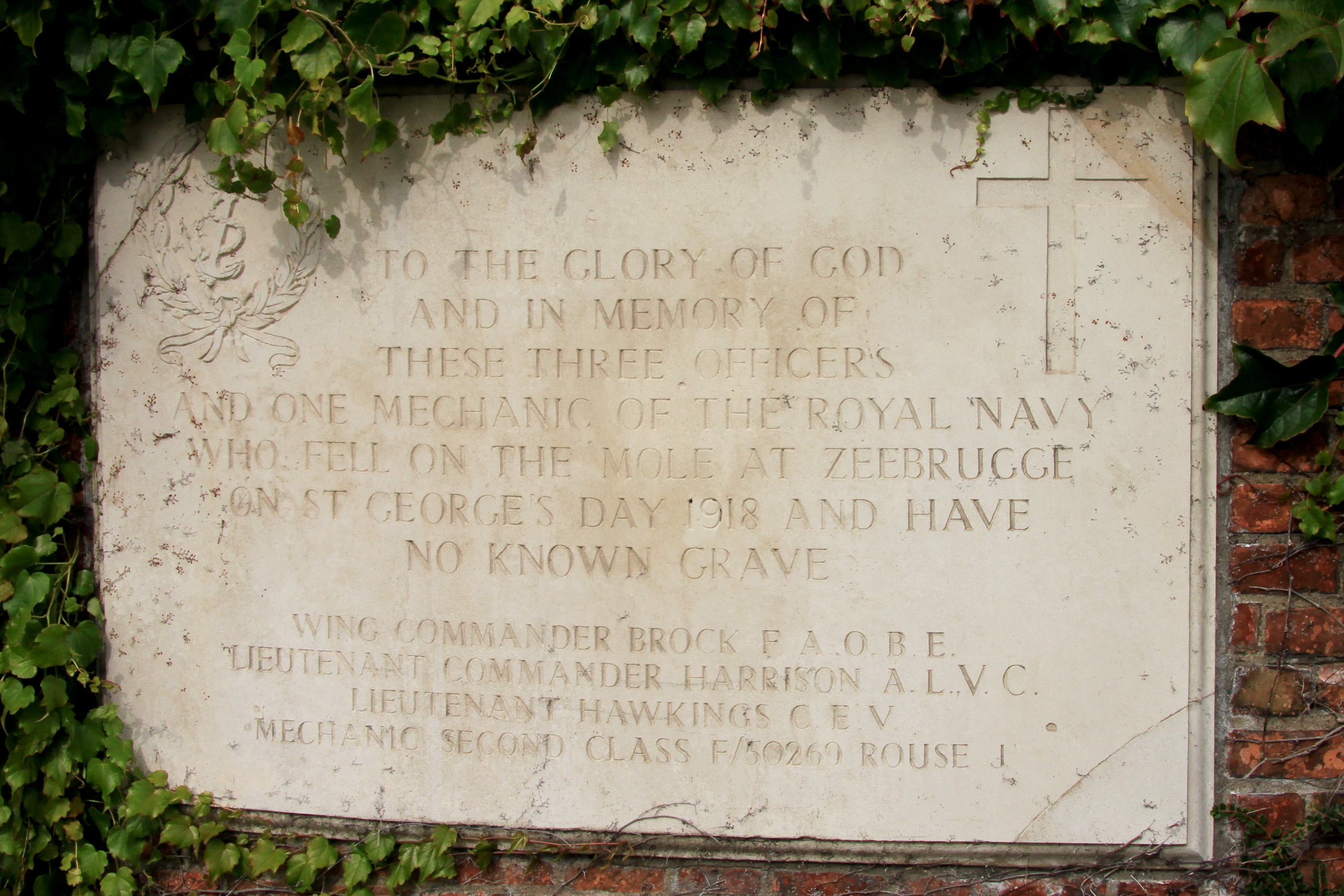
Zeebrugge Memorial. Inscription reads: "To the glory of God and in memory of these three officers and one mechanic of the Royal Navy who fell on the mole at Zeebrugge on Saint George's Day 1918 and have no known grave Wing Commander Brock F. A. O.B.E. Lieutenant Commander Harrison A. L. V.C. Lieutenant Hawkings C.E.V. Mechanic Second Class F/50269 Rouse J"

Wing Commander Frank Arthur Brock OBE (29 June 1884 – 23 April 1918) was a British officer commissioned into the Royal Artillery, the Royal Naval Volunteer Reserve, the Royal Naval Air Service (RNAS) and finally, when the RNAS merged with the RFC, the Royal Air Force. He invented the explosive bullet that destroyed the German Zeppelins and he devised and executed the smoke screen used during the Zeebrugge Raid on 23 April 1918, an attempt by the Royal Navy to block the Belgian port of Bruges-Zeebrugge during the First World War.

== Background ==
Brock was born in South Norwood, Surrey, the son of Arthur Brock of Haredon, Sutton, Surrey, of the famous C.T. Brock & Co. fireworks manufacturers. He was educated at Dulwich College where he blew up a stove in his form room. Brock joined the family business in 1901 (later becoming a director) where he remained until the outbreak of the First World War.

He joined the Royal Artillery, being commissioned as a temporary lieutenant on 10 October 1914 but within a month was loaned to the Navy, to which he transferred, becoming a temporary sub-lieutenant in the Royal Naval Volunteer Reserve on 27 October 1914. He was promoted to lieutenant on 31 December 1914, becoming a flight lieutenant of the Royal Naval Air Service (RNAS) on 1 January 1915. Brock was a member of the Admiralty Board of Invention and Research and founded, organized and commanded the Royal Navy Experimental Station at Stratford.

Among his many developments were:

- The Dover Flare – used in anti-submarine warfare.
- The Brock Colour Filter
- The Brock Bullet (or Brock Incendiary Bullet or Brock Anti-Zeppelin Bullet) – the first German airship to be shot down was destroyed by this bullet. Most British fighter aircraft machine guns used a mixture of Brock, Pomeroy and Buckingham bullets when attacking Zeppelins.
- Working with Archibald Low and the Royal Flying Corps (RFC) Experimental Works in Feltham on wireless triggered bombs for the Zeebrugge Raid. and the guided rocket.

By the time the RNAS merged with the Royal Flying Corps to form the Royal Air Force on 1 April 1918, Brock had risen to the rank of wing commander, and in January 1918 had been made an Officer of the Order of the British Empire (OBE) in the 1918 New Year Honours.

== Zeebrugge Raid ==
On the night of 22/23 April 1918, the Zeebrugge Raid began when an armada of British sailors and marines led by the old cruiser HMS Vindictive, attacked the Mole at Zeebrugge in Belgium, to block the mouth of the canal and negate the serious threat to Allied shipping, that was being posed by the port being used by Imperial German Navy U-boats and light shipping. Brock brought on board with him a box marked 'Highly Explosive, Do Not Open' which actually contained bottles of vintage port which were drunk by his men. For the attack, Brock was in charge of the massive smoke screens that were to cover the approach of the raiding party:

"Brock's new and improved smokescreen, or "artificial fog" as he preferred to call it, was ingenious. Essentially, a chemical mixture was injected directly under pressure into the hot exhausts of the motor torpedo boats and other small craft or the hot interior surface of the funnels of destroyers. The larger ships each had welded iron contraptions, in the region of ten feet in height, hastily assembled at Chatham. These were fed with solid cakes of phosphide of calcium. Dropped into a bucket-like container full of water, the resulting smoke and flames roared up a chimney and were dispersed by a windmill arrangement. It was more toxic than its predecessor. Taking in a lungful was an extremely unpleasant experience."

At Zeebrugge, Brock, anxious to discover the secret of the German system of sound-ranging, begged permission to go ashore, not content to watch the action from an observation ship. He joined a storming party on the Mole and was killed in action.

There is an account of Imperial German Navy sailor Hermann Künne being involved in a fight with an English officer. Künne attacked a British officer armed with a revolver and a cutlass. Künne was similarly armed with a cutlass. He slashed his opponent across the neck and grabbed the revolver. The British officer, desperately wounded, stabbed Künne as he fell. Given that the Victoria Cross citation for Lieutenant Commander Harrison makes no mention of a sword fight, there are those who believe that Brock was the British officer killed by Künne.

Brock received a mention in despatches from Vice-Admiral Sir Roger Keyes, for his distinguished services on the night of 22–23 April 1918, He is commemorated on the Zeebrugge Memorial, which stands in Zeebrugge Churchyard. The Zeebrugge Memorial commemorates Brock, one mechanic from Brock's group, and two other officers of the Royal Navy who died on the mole at Zeebrugge and have no known grave. His wife erected a memorial at Brookwood Cemetery, which commemorates him and her sisters two deceased husbands, all three of whom had served in the Royal Navy as officers.

Henry Major Tomlinson wrote of Wing Commander Brock: "A first-rate pilot and excellent shot, Commander Brock was a typical English sportsman; and his subsequent death during the operations, for whose success he had been so largely responsible, was a loss of the gravest description to both the Navy and the empire."

== In literature ==
Gunpowder & Glory is the first biography of Brock. Co-authored by his grandson Harry Smee and the established writer Henry Macrory, the book was published in 2020 by Casemate UK Ltd and explains the centuries of the Brock family, which began its firework enterprise in the 17th century and from which Frank Brock emerged in 1884.

Other books in which Brock appears include:

- Memories by Admiral of the Fleet Lord Fisher, Hodder & Stoughton – London. 1919
- Pyrotechnics - The History and Art of Firework Making by Alan St. Hill Brock A.R.I.B.A Daniel O’Connor – London. 1922
- The Blocking of Zeebrugge by Captain Alfred F.B. Carpenter V.C., RN, Herbert Jenkins Limited – London. 1922
- The Naval Memoirs of Admiral of the Fleet Sir Roger Keyes – Scapa Flow to the Dover Straits 1916 – 1918 Thornton Butterworth Ltd – London. 1935
- A History of Fireworks by Alan St. H. Brock A.R.I.B.A. George G. Harrap & Co. Ltd – London. 1949
- Zeebrugge – Eleven VCs before breakfast by Barrie Pitt, Cassell Military Paperbacks – London. 1958
- The Zeebrugge Raid by Philip Warner, William Kimber and Co. Limited – London. 1978
- Battleground Series - Zeebrugge & Ostend Raids 1918 by Stephen McGreal, Pen & Sword Books Ltd. – Barnsley. 2007
- The Zeebrugge and Ostend Raids 1918 by Deborah Lake, Pen & Sword Books Ltd. – Barnsley. 2002
- The Zeebrugge Raid 1918 – 'The Finest Feat of Arms' by Paul Kendal, Spellmount – The History Press – Gloucestershire. 2008
- The Flatpack Bombers – The Royal Navy and the Zeppelin Menace by Ian Gardiner, Pen & Sword Books Ltd. – Barnsley. 2009
- No Pyrrhic Victories – The 1918 Raids on Zeebrugge and Ostend – A Radical Reappraisal by E.C. Coleman, Spellmount – The History Press, Gloucestershire. 2014
- Zeebrugge . 1918 – The Greatest Raid of All by Christopher Sandford, Casemate Publishers – Oxford & Philadelphia. 2018
