= British unmanned aerial vehicles of World War I =

Unmanned Aerial Vehicles (UAVs) include both autonomous (capable of operating without human input) drones and remotely piloted vehicles (RPVs). The UAVs used in World War I were RPVs. Soon after its change from the Army Balloon Factory to the Royal Aircraft Factory in 1912, designers at this Farnborough base turned their thoughts to flying an unmanned aircraft. During the First World War this pioneering work resulted in trials of remotely controlled aircraft for the Royal Flying Corps and unmanned boats for the Royal Navy that were controlled from 'mother' aircraft. By the end of the war Britain had flown and controlled a drone aircraft and a number of fast unmanned motor boats operating in close flotilla formation that had been individually controlled by radio from operators flying in 'mother' aircraft. The work continued in the interwar years.

== The Factory 1914 design ==
There is a Royal Aircraft Factory engineering drawing of October 1914 of an unmanned powered monoplane 9 ft 3 in (2.82 m) long with a 10 ft (3.0 m) wingspan. This was developed as a means to counter the threat of aerial bombing from German dirigible airships. This new potential weapon was called Aerial Target (AT), a misnomer to fool the Germans into thinking it was a drone to test anti-aircraft systems.

== Ruston Proctor ==
Henry Folland at the Royal Aircraft Factory designed an AT powered by an ABC Gnat engine which was built by Ruston Proctor of Lincoln in 1916 and 1917.

== Sopwith ==
With Harry Hawker, Sopwith at Kingston upon Thames built a single-bay biplane AT with a wingspan of about 14 ft (4.3 m) which was to carry a 50 lb (23 kg) explosive charge. Stability came from pronounced dihedral and there was a four-wheel undercarriage. The aircraft was damaged during erection at Feltham and was never tested. The design was later reworked into the Sopwith Sparrow.

== 1917 Aerial Target ==
The history of UAV target drones started when the Royal Flying Corps developed their prototype remote controlled aircraft and gave it the cover name Aerial Target (AT). All the 1917 Aerial Target aircraft from the various designers used the radio control system devised by Archibald Low at the RFC's Experimental Works in Feltham. One of Geoffrey de Havilland's AT aircraft powered by a Gnat engine that was launched from a pneumatically powered ramp in the RFC trials at Upavon on 21 March 1917 became the world's first powered drone aircraft to fly under radio control. The engine driven actuator applied progressively increasing deflection of the selected control (elevators or rudder) up to its limit until the selection lever was released by the ground operator. With no control demanded, the control surface was returned to its trim position by springs. The mechanism was later exhibited by the IWM as "The original model receiving set installed in the radio controlled monoplane used in the trial flight". along with the Selective Transmitter which the operator on the ground used to send control the control signals.

Low's system's encoded the command transmissions as a counter-measure to prevent enemy intervention. These codes could be changed daily,

In order further to safeguard against outside interference I may have a number of inertia wheels of variable speed, only one being correctly adjusted to pick up the timed signals and actuate the mechanism....and could be varied every day.

By July 1917, six Aerial Targets designed by the Factory had been built and were tested at Northolt. Attempts were made to launch the first three from rails laid on the ground but they all crashed on launching and the trials were terminated. The Aerial Target was later acknowledged to be a viable weapon, "...aircraft carrying high explosive charges are capable of being controlled by wireless....". The AT project was transferred to Biggin Hill, to what became the Wireless Experimental Establishment. By 1922 the work had been returned to the Royal Aircraft Establishment (RAE) at Farnborough.

== The Royal Flying Corps 1917 Guided Rocket ==
Archibald Low said "...in 1917 the Experimental Works designed an electrically steered rocket... Rocket experiments were conducted under my own patents with the help of Cdr. Brock". Like Low, Brock was an experimental officer who commanded the Royal Navy Experimental Station at Stratford; Brock was also a Director of the C.T. Brock & Co. fireworks manufacturers. The patent "Improvements in Rockets" was raised in July 1918 referring by then to the Royal Air Force but was not published until February 1923 for secrecy. Firing and guidance controls could be either wire or wireless. The propulsion and guidance rocket eflux emerged from the deflecting cowl at the nose. The 1950s IWM exhibition label states "Later in 1917, an electrically steered rocket was designed.... with the designed purpose of pursuing a hostile airman." A model of this dirigible rocket was included in this exhibition. The model was accompanied by a note: "Exhibit that is part of Professor AM Low's exhibits. Model of the wireless controlled dirigible rocket missile designed to pursue a hostile airman".

== Radio guidance and the Feltham Unit ==
During World War One, work started on radio guided weapons at various establishments, such as the experiments of Capt. Cyril Percy Ryan at Hawkcraig Experimental Station (H.M.S. Tarlair). However, as control by the Munitions Inventions Department over military research was introduced, a centre for the Royal Flying Corps radio guided weapons was established. This was the secret Experimental Works in Feltham. The focus of their work was radio guided systems but the unit also assisted with other tasks. They were involved in testing the Pomeroy bullet and George Constantinescu's synchronization gear. They provided 'distractions' for the Zeebrugge raid and its Commanding Officer Archibald Low, travelled to France and into neutral Spain during the war to debunk reports of 'fantastic' weapons. Low had at least 30 specialists under his command at Feltham supported by their contractors and suppliers. They had motor transport and military and police security. Their balloon facility was used to conduct radio reception experiments and they tested their equipment using aircraft with trailing aerials. Low was a qualified RFC observer. His officers included his second in command Henry Poole, his radio engineer George Whitton, the talented inventor Ernest Bowen and the carburation specialist Louis Mantell.

Low was commended for this work by a number of senior officers including Sir David Henderson (the wartime commander of the RFC) and Admiral Edward Fitzherbert (Director of Mines and Torpedoes). Sir Henry Norman (Chairman of the War Office Committee on Wireless Telegraphy and at this time the Munitions Inventions Department's permanent attaché to the French Ministry of Inventions.) wrote to Low in March 1918, saying "I know of no man who has more extensive and more profound scientific knowledge, combined with a greater gift on imaginative invention than yourself."

Their work had started in 1915 at the commercial motor garage business owned by Henry Poole, in Chiswick. During 1916 the development showed such promise that the RFC established their secret Experimental Works in premises commandeered from the Davis Paraffin Carburettor Company and the Duval Composition Company, in the old Ivory Works in Feltham. Later these Experimental Works were moved to Low's premises at 86 High Street, Feltham where all the Navy work was also carried out in 1918.

== The Adjutant-General investigation ==
Details of the Feltham Experimental Works have survived in the records of a legal claim against Archibald Low. On 5 December 1917 he was accused of plagiarism and abuse of office by a civilian inventor Clifton West. On 26 January 1918 Colonel Ernest Swinton provided his friend John Morgan with an assessment of Clifton West as "...a clever man and very ingenious, but tends towards the type of inventions 'crank'. He is also the most perfect mug in the world, as I have told him and is like a bit of toasted cheese to all the rats and crooks within a hundred miles: they smell him coming and get out their Bowie knives". The case against Archibald Low was not pursued. Clifton's plagiarism case involved his Land Torpedo, a rolling cable drum device to snag and destroy barbed wire defences, similar to that patented under instruction from his superiors on behalf of the RFC by Archibald Low.

== 1918 aircraft-controlled unmanned boats ==
In 1917 the priority for Low's control system changed; the new imperative being to counter the submarine threat. Low and Ernest Bowen transferred into the Royal Navy to adapt the AT system to the airborne control of Royal Navy Distance Control Boats (DCB), a variant of the Coastal Motor Boat to be filled with an explosive charge. Thornycroft were contracted to design these new DCB's (and the conversions of some of the existing CMBs) to carry this large and heavy explosive payload in the bow. The resulting craft was considered to be fragile though seaworthy (but only in fair weather). The AT work was documented and transferred to Royal Flying Corps radio unit at Biggin Hill. The Feltham Works were still under Low's command and this is where the redevelopment and production of equipment was carried out, clock-driven impulse senders for DCBs being ordered on 13 March 1918. The port/starboard demand from the controller's sender units in the aircraft caused a gyroscope on the boat to change the direction of its axis by "precession" to the "new" required heading. Any "difference" between the boats current heading and the required heading (i.e. the gyroscopes alignment) started an electric motor driving a worm gear in the appropriate direction to turn the rudder. This reduced any "difference" as the boat responded and acquired the new required heading. Thus any difference caused the boat to manoeuvre to keep it on the gyroscope's "required" heading, whether that difference occurred due to wave, wind or tide deflecting the boat or to control signal demands from the "mother" aircraft precessing the gyroscope.

Conversions of the 40-ft CMBs Number 3, 9 and 13 were three of the five DCBs built.

The extensive trials were successful and the DCB weapon was acknowledged to be "capable of control up to the moment of hitting." Admiral Edward Stafford Fitzherbert (Director of Mines and Torpedoes) stated on 18 March 1918 in a letter concerning Archibald Low's achievements during his Navy tour of duty that "Captain Low was gazetted as Lieut. Commander as from 2 October 1917 recommended by Sir David Henderson, Brig. General Caddell, Brig. General Pitcher and Major, Sir Henry Norman, M.P., P.C.", ... "He has assigned about 14 complete Patent to Services", ... "He has voluntarily lent his entire laboratory and staff to Admiralty etc. where manufacturing is now carried out." and "Three distinct inventions have now been accepted into service after being tested, namely...1. Complete sending control gear for D.C.B. 2. Electrical Gun Timing Apparatus 3. Gun Silencer audiometer Measuring Device".

== D.C.B. Section (Royal Navy) ==
The secret Distantly Controlled Boat (D.C.B.) Section of the Royal Navy Signals School, Portsmouth, was set up to develop aerial radio systems for the control of unmanned naval vessels from 'mother' aircraft. This D.C.B. Section was based at Calshot under the command of Eric Robinson VC. On 1 September 1917 George Callaghan, Commander-in-Chief, The Nore, was informed that significant shore and mooring facilities were to be made available for D.C.B. trials and rehearsals in the Thames Estuary. Airfield facilities were also requested in the area for the 'mother' aircraft. On 9 October 1917 the Deputy Director of Naval Construction, William Gard assessed the Armed boarding steamer HMS Carron for use as a D.C.B. blocking ship but it was considered more suitable as a parent ship and floating repair depot for the D.C.B. Section. By then this D.C.B. Section had access to many vessels including the submarine HMS C4 and to the support of aircraft, pilots and the trained radio control operators. They had conducted trials guiding unmanned boats into the busy waters around Portsmouth Harbour. Then between 28 May and 31 May 1918 trials were undertaken by the Royal Navy Dover Command, using operators in Armstrong Whitworth F.K.8 aircraft Nos. 5082 and 5117, in charge of Captain Tate (RAF) to control the boats. During these trials Acting Vice-Admiral Sir Roger Keyes and Rear-Admiral Cecil Dampier were on board one of these D.C.B.s while it was remotely controlled. Trials included steering them through 'gates' created by motor launches anchored 60 yd (55 m) apart. A significant number of high ranking and senior Admiralty, Naval and political officials are referenced in the surviving records.

Harbour blocking and shipping attacks were considered prime targets for this new weapon. Considerable resources would have been required (and put at risk) to get DCBs within range to launch attacks and this had to be balanced against the chances of success. The launch range was based upon running for 2 hours at 30 kn (56 km/h; 35 mph), the time that the DCB engines could be operated without attention. The Admiralty Plans Division (Captain Dudley Pound) report of 6 April 1918 on operations with D.C.B's controlled from aircraft began,

It is considered that the time is now ripe to formulate concrete plans. It is assumed that 60–80 miles should be considered the maximum range possible at present under normal conditions. Owing to limitations of wave-lengths, four D.C.B's would be used at a time, but further relays of four boats could be sent at intervals of not less than 5 miles. The D.C.B.s. will contain an explosive charge considerably heavier than any modern Torpedo.

The targets he evaluated in detail were vessels at Emden, Zeebrugge and Ostend, at enemy harbours in the Adriatic, at Constantinople and its vicinity and at sea. The report states, "As regards lock-gates, wharfs, piers, etc. These can be found at Emden, Zeebrugge, Ostend, etc. Targets on the Elbe are, at present, at rather long range unless it is feasible to employ aircraft in relays". He states, "These boats, with their heavy load of explosive, will tide over the time until suitable aircraft are produced which can carry a torpedo with a head capable of creating a decisive effect on capital ships" and "If 3 or 4 Flotillas (of four each) of these boats were prepared, a continued attack might be made on Ostend". Following a request from the David Beatty the Commander-In-Chief Grand Fleet on 22 July 1918 the report of the Dover Trials assessed the employment of these boats in the German Bight or for fleet operations and this report of the 27 September 1918 began with the declaration that "Wireless controlling gear for steering a vessel from an aircraft, ship or shore station, is an accomplished fact, and can probably be fitted to any type of vessel. Successful experiments have already been carried out with submarines, motor launches, and 40-foot coastal motor boats". Their main sources of radio control developments were Captain Ryan at the Hawkcraig Experimental Station and Captain Low in the Feltham Experimental Works. The DCB Section used the work of others such as the Birmingham inventor George Dallison and the Russian Air Force officer Sergey Oulianine who was based in Paris.

As an indication of the extent and urgency of the D.C.B. Section's work, Captain Low recorded the supply of aircraft radio control sender units for trials with DCB Nos, 20, 21, 22 and 24 and in one letter stated "... it has meant a very large amount of overtime and night work I think it will be necessary to give my men at least two days' rest when once this complete device has been delivered to you".

== Preparation for D.C.B. Operations ==
Charles Penrose Rushton Coode, The Director of Operations Division (Foreign) suggested that operations would be impeded in Northern areas during the coming winter season. Commanders of the areas covering the targets assessed in the Plans Division report were advised of the capabilities of Distantly Controlled Boats including, on the 7 October 1918, Admiral of the Fleet, Sir Somerset Arthur Gough-Calthorpe, C-in-C, Mediterranean. No D.C.B. operations were mounted before the Armistice.

== Post War assessment ==
Before the Feltham Experimental Works were closed John Knowles Im Thurn who was at this time the assistant director of Electrical Torpedo and Mining wrote to Archibald Low on 19 May 1919 stating "It is a matter of great regret to me that the Armistice and consequent demobilisation came too soon for your enlarged establishment to fill the important place we had assigned to it, as an experimental offshoot of the Signal School, Portsmouth.....Your extraordinary ability and originality as a designer, combined with your sound scientific training will be a great loss to us.." The Works closed on 13 October 1919.

The Final Report of the Post-War Questions Committee, dated 27 March 1920, stated: "We have heard evidence that aircraft carrying high explosive charges are capable of being controlled by wireless as are the Distant Control Boats, but we do not consider that they will be a real menace to Capital Ships." The Questions Committee said on the subject of the DCBs that "it is difficult, if not impossible, for an enemy to interfere with the control by wireless jambing, since each boat works on a different wave length and the discovery of the wave length is a delicate operation" and "these weapons are already capable of being handled in numbers: two of them can be controlled by one aircraft, three of them have been manoeuvred close to one another simultaneously without mutual interference, and probably as many as eight can be handled in a group if the groups are not within about four miles of one another." The committee concluded the DCB weapon "is in a different category from all others in that it is capable of control up to the moment of hitting, and this fact alone justifies close attention to development" into ultimate form as "into a shallow or surface-running torpedo of great size". While they thought that "In its present state of development...that it is not a great menace to the Capital Ship", they said it merited "uninterrupted research both in the perfection of the weapon itself and in the preparation of counter measures".

== The RFC links to subsequent UAV developments ==
In 1921 the R.A.E. resumed unmanned aircraft development, setting up the Radio Controlled Aircraft Committee. Initially they used their '1917 Type Aerial Target' aircraft refitted with a more powerful 45 h.p. Armstrong Siddeley Ounce engine. In 1925 they developed the `Larynx'. By January 1933 a Fairey Queen IIIF drone target survived unscathed through a major RN gunnery trial. Following further demonstrations using the Queen IIIF ('Faerie Queen') aircraft, the world's first fleet of drones was developed and these entered service in 1935. They were the de Havilland DH.82 Queen Bees. Their control system came out of the same First World War / R.A.E. stable as the original de Havilland 1917 Aerial Target and they were also launched from a pneumatically powered ramp. Over 400 of these were in service before WWII. They were used to test anti-aircraft defences. A 1939 article on the Queen Bee concluded "Twenty years is a long time, but the men who have designed and developed the radio-controlled target aircraft have made full use of that time. Furthermore, the experiments of those twenty years cannot be imitated in a matter of weeks. Not only is Great Britain many years in advance of every other country in this sphere, but she is also likely to remain ahead."

The next major development were the first US fleets of target drones during the Second World War. Four veterans of the RFC (and its successor, the Royal Air Force) link the 1917 Aerial Target to these subsequent US drone developments. Archibald Low's commanding officer on the RFC Aerial Target project was Duncan Pitcher. In 1921 he was Robert Loraine's best man. Loraine had a great deal in common with Reginald Denny who founded the Radioplane Company in California. Denny and Loraine were both British actors who had successful careers in the USA. They had been in a West End production together in 1902 in London. They were both veterans of the RFC, they both visited close relative living on the boundaries of Richmond Park in London and they were both flying and making films in Hollywood in the 1930s when Denny became interested in radio controlled aircraft. Denny's Radioplane, the 1940s company that made the first mass-produced drones for the US Army and Navy was eventually acquired by Northrop Grumman who make the RQ-4 Global Hawk drone.

The Royal Navy also continued to develop their remote radio control assets. The pre-dreadnought battleship HMS Agamemnon was converted into a remote control target ship in 1920.

== Imperial War Museum exhibition ==
On 29 June 1955 Low and Lord Brabazon presented a model of the AT and the various artefacts from the Feltham Unit to the Imperial War Museum for their planned exhibition. These included the control system that flew in March 1917.

== Surviving artefacts and their photographs ==
The Royal Flying Corps' Aerial Target was the world's first drone unmanned aircraft (UAV) to fly under control from the ground. A photograph of this 1917 22-foot (6.7-metre) wingspan Aerial Target aircraft exists. Parts of it were saved by Low and these still exist as well as contemporary photographs although they are not on public display. One of the 1918 Distance Control Boats CMB9/DCB1 has been saved and carefully restored.

== Recent archival research ==
Until 2016 the RFC Aerial Target project was deemed by most sources to have failed and been terminated. The on-line images of the Imperial War Museum Feltham artefacts were not presented as a collection. Prior to 2019 no known source had published details of the Royal Flying Corps secret patents or demonstrated that they matched and described the items in this IWM collection. The Feltham Works re-application of their system to control the Royal Navy DCBs had not been established. Details of the mysterious Feltham Works were in the National Archives but not published. References to the post war influence of the Feltham Works success as it passed via Biggin Hill to the Royal Aircraft Establishment have now been researched. The suspected influence of Pitcher and Loraine on Denny's involvement with UAVs was recognised in 2019. The Imperial War Museum now state... "The Aerial Target... became the first drone to fly under control when it was tested in March 1917. The pilot (in control of the flight from the ground) on this occasion was the future world speed record holder Henry Segrave".

== Historical significance ==
During the First World War the Aerial Targets and subsequent DCBs were developed as ripostes to the aerial bombing and naval blockade of Britain by the Central Powers. The ATs involved the industrial efforts of at least three of Britain's big aircraft companies along with the novel engine development of the "Gnat" engine by ABC Motors, the control system development by the Feltham Works and the integration and trials facilities of other RFC bases. The project was sustained over the worst years of the war when Munitions Inventions Department approval was required for such projects. The unit also provided radio controls for floating mines. The Feltham Works foreshadowed the R.A.E. that inherited the Feltham patents and AT hardware. They resumed development of Remote Piloted Vehicles through the interwar years, leading to the fleet of Queen Bee RPVs. In 1976 Low was inducted into the International Space Hall of Fame and has been called the "Father of Radio Guidance Systems".

== Sources ==
- Allen, Dennis W. (2015). Unmanned Aircraft FAST Monograph No 003. Farnborough Air Sciences Trust.
- Bloom, Ursula (1958). He Lit The Lamp: A Biography Of Professor A. M. Low. London: Burke. OCLC 1998665.
- King, H. F. (1981). Sopwith Aircraft 1912–1920 (1st ed.). London: Putnam. ISBN 0-370-30050-5 – via Archive Foundation.
- Lewis, Peter (1979). The British Fighter Since 1912. London: Putnam. ISBN 0-370-10049-2.
- Low, A. M. (3 October 1952). "The First Guided Missile". Flight: 436 onwards. ISSN 0015-3710.
- Mills, Steve (2019). The Dawn of the Drone: from the back room boys of the Royal Flying Corps. Havertown: Casemate. ISBN 978-1-61-200790-8.
