= Sergey Ulyanin =

Russian aircraft designer and military pilot (1871–1921)

Sergey Alekseevich Ulyanin
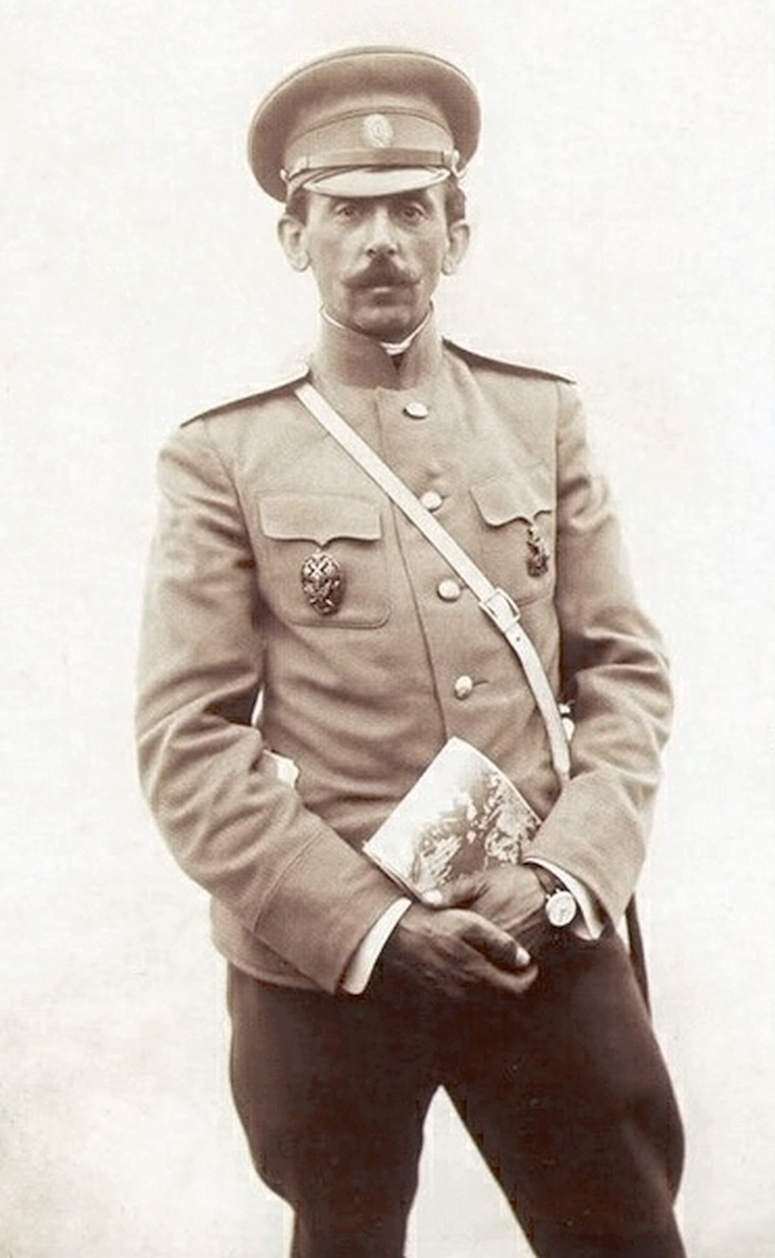
- Born: 25 September 1871; Moscow; Russian Empire
- Died: 13 October 1921 (aged 50); London; United Kingdom
- Military career
- Allegiance: Russian Empire (1890–1917); Russian Republic (1917); Russian SFSR (1917–1918)
- Branch: Infantry, Russian Engineer Troops, Air Force
- Service years: 1890–1918
- Rank: Colonel
- Unit: 111th Don Infantry Regiment
- Commands: Officers Aeronautics School; Air Service of the Russian Republic
- Conflicts: First World War
- Awards: Order of Saint Stanislaus (House of Romanov); Order of Saint Anna; Order of Saint Vladimir; Legion of Honour

Sergey Alekseevich Ulyanin (Russian: Серге́й Алексе́евич Улья́нин, (25 September [O.S. 13 September] 1871, Moscow — 13 October 1921, London) was a Russian aircraft designer and military pilot, a pioneer of military use of aerial photography and commander of the Russian Air Force in 1917-1918.

== Life ==
Born into a family of gentry of the Moscow Governorate. He spoke English, French, German, studied Spanish and Esperanto. Ulyanin graduated from the 2nd Moscow Cadet Corps named after Nicholas I. In 1894 he finished 3rd Alexander Military school becoming an infantry podporuchik. In 1895 he started his aviation career after studying at the Aeronautical Training Park in St. Petersburg and appointment to the aeronautical detachment of the Warsaw fortress, which he went on to command in 1905. In the same year 1895 Ouilanine started designing man-lifting kites to be used for military observation. A “kite train” of 7 to 10 conjoined kites of his design could lift four people. In 1904, Ulyanin started research in remote control of aircraft, ships and land vehicles (in 1910 he patented a technology of remote control and in October 1915 a radio-controlled boat of his construction sailed from Kronstadt to Peterhof). In 1908, he was granted a patent for a photo camera for automatic recording of photogrammetric data (in use until 1920s). In 1909, Ulyanin designed a two-engine airplane with a combination of three planes. In 1910, Sergey Ulyanin became one of seven Russian officers sent to France to train as an airplane pilot. On 9 August 1910 he was fourth Russian soldier and eighth Russian to obtain a pilot’s license in France (number 181). In early 1910, captain Sergey Ulyanin joins the brothers Vladimir and Alexander Lebedev to create PTA (St. Petersburg Aviation Partnership) which received a government contract to design a "foldable plane" that could be assembled within 2 hours. The reconnaissance plane PTA-1 was completed on 26 January 1911. It was based on Farman III but with a smaller wing area and a nacelle for the pilot and the observer. The aircraft received a prize at the St. Petersburg aeronautics exhibition of 1911.

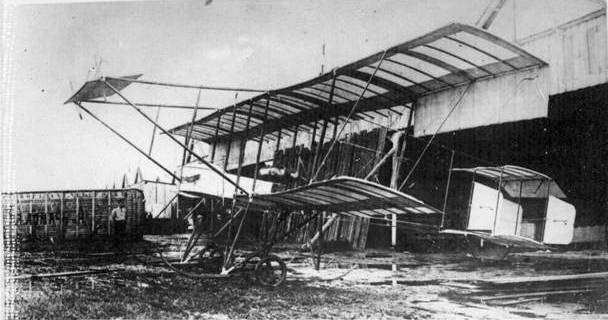
Biplane PTA № 1, design by Sergey Ulyanin, 1911

- 1911 — appointed chief of Aviation section of the Officers Aeronautics School.

In 1912, he elaborated the terms of a competition of devices for dropping bombs from airplanes and balloons.

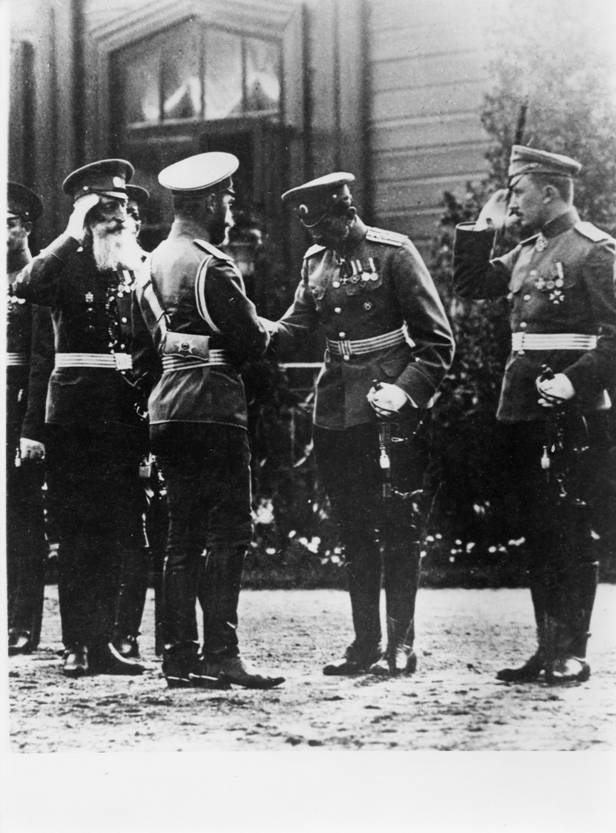
Krasnoye Selo, 25 July 1913. Lt Col Ulyanin meets Nicholas II (On the left, chief of the Officers Aeronautics School Lt Gen Alexander Kovanko, to the right, Ulyanin’s deputy stabs-kapitan Georgy Gorshkov)

- 5 October 1913 — promoted to the rank of colonel.
- 18 August 1914 — first director of the Military aviation school in Gatchina.
- 1915 — granted patent for the invention of a gyroscope.
- 1915 — appointed head of Procurement Commission for aviation and aeronautics materiel.

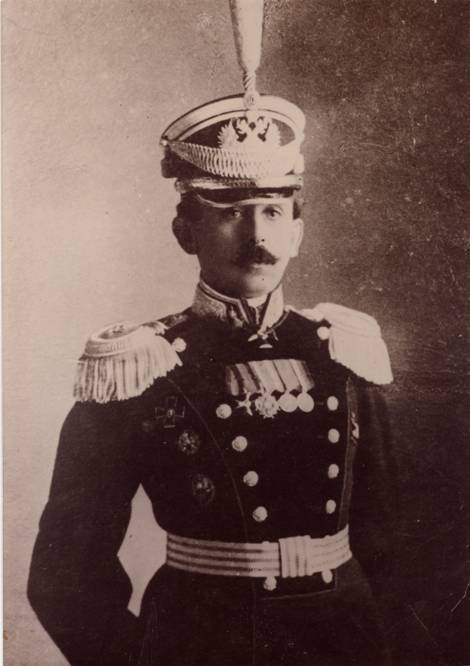
Col. Sergey Ulyanin, 1916

- 7 March 1916 — appointed to the position of Major general at the Military aviation school.
- 1916 — granted UK patent for high sensibility electric relay.
- 22 August 1916 — Deputy Head of the Directorate of Air Force.
- 19 April 1917 — appointed first Chief of the Field Directorate of aviation and aeronautics at the Commander-in-Chief’s headquarters.
- 9 June 1917 — appointed Deputy Head of the Directorate of Air Force responsible for training.
- Autumn 1917 — Head of the Directorate of Air Force.
- March 1918 — sent abroad to liquidate the means of the Procurement Commission and organize a new Aviation Information Mission in UK, Italy and France. Emigration to Britain. His patents were assessed by the Royal Navy's D.C.B. Section.

He died on 13 October 1921 in London. Buried in Brockley and Ladywell Cemeteries.

== Awards ==
Russian

- Order of Saint Stanislaus (House of Romanov) 3rd class in 1899
- Order of Saint Anna 3rd class in 1905, 2nd class in 1910
- Order of Saint Vladimir (4th class in 1913, 3rd class in 1915)
- His Imperial Majesty’s gratitude for exemplary service and performing special tasks in war circumstances (6 December 1916)
- Medal “In memory of the reign of the Emperor Alexander III”
- Medal “In memory of the 300th Anniversary of Romanov Dynasty, 1613-1913”

Foreign

- Legion of Honour Officer.

== Family ==
Son of a land owner in the village of Staraya Sitnya, Moscow Governorate Aleksey Ulyanin (1817—1879). One of his siblings was Nikolay Ulyanin (1850—1907), Engineer Major general, chief of the Central Asian Railway, killed in a terrorist attack during the revolution of 1905-1907. Sergey Ulyanin was married twice. His first wife (1900) was Maria Mitrofanovna von Meyer (1878—1943), daughter of a nobleman, engineer Mitrofan von Meyer. Two children (Ludmila (1901—1977) and Irina (1906—1945) were born in this marriage. His second wife was Ludmila Mikhaylovna Martynova (1890—1970), daughter of the doctor Mikhail Martynov. The children born in this marriage were:

- Nina (1915—2008) — a designer, married to Henri G. Lejet.
- Marina (1919—2001) — a translator.
- Alexis (1920—2007) — British Army Major

== Patents and articles ==
- Привилегия № 16266 Россия. Фотографический аппарат для автоматической записи фотограмметрических данных // С. А. Ульянин (Россия). — № 35392. Заявл. 31.03.08; Опубл. 30.11.09. 3 с.: илл. Группа V1;
- Привилегия № 19222 Россия. Прибор для вычерчивания кривой линии / С. А. Ульянин (Россия). № 42622; Заявл. 19.02.10; Опубл. 27.09.11. — 5 с.: илл. — Группа V/VI;
- Охранительное свидетельство № 42800 Россия. Складной разборный змей // С. А. Ульянин (Россия). Заявл. 04.03.10;
- Охранительное свидетельство № 42806 Россия. Парусная каретка, служащая для управления с земли или автоматического подъёма и спуска фотографических аппаратов и иных приборов / С. А. Ульянин (Россия). Заявл. 04.03.10;
- Привилегия № 29425 Россия. Гироскоп / С. А. Ульянин (Россия). — № 68091; Заявл. 30.11.15; Опубл. 20.07.17. — 3 с.: илл. — Класс 42с;
- Привилегия № 29275 Россия. Разборная палатка для аэропланов / С. А. Ульянин (Россия). — № 57239; Заявл. 26.03.13; Опубл. 29.04.17. — 2 с.: илл. — Класс 62с;
- Patent 110569. England. MKI. Improvements in or relating to Electric Relays / Serge Ulyanin (Russia);
- HASELNINE Co (England, USA) № 14957/16; Заявл. 20.10.16; Опубл. 22.10.17. — 3 л.: илл;
- Прибор для воображаемой стрельбы при пособии тиражных чисел // Артиллерийский журнал. — 1899. № 7. — СПб. — С. 663—672.: илл. 9.
- Описание фотограмметрического аппарата и таблиц Ульянина — Изд. ГИУ, 1909; Новости по авиации // Записки Императорского Русского Технического Общества. —1912, вып. 10. — С. 344;
- Проект способа оценки аэропланов на военном конкурсе // Техника воздухоплавания. — 1912. № 4. — С. 213—216, 232;
- Метод оценки аэропланов // Записки Императорского Русского Технического Общества. 1913. № 8-9. — С.235 — 236;
- Современный военный флот. — Пг. — Изд. Семёнова, 1914. — 26 с.: илл.
