= Pomeroy bullet =

Type of explosive ammunition

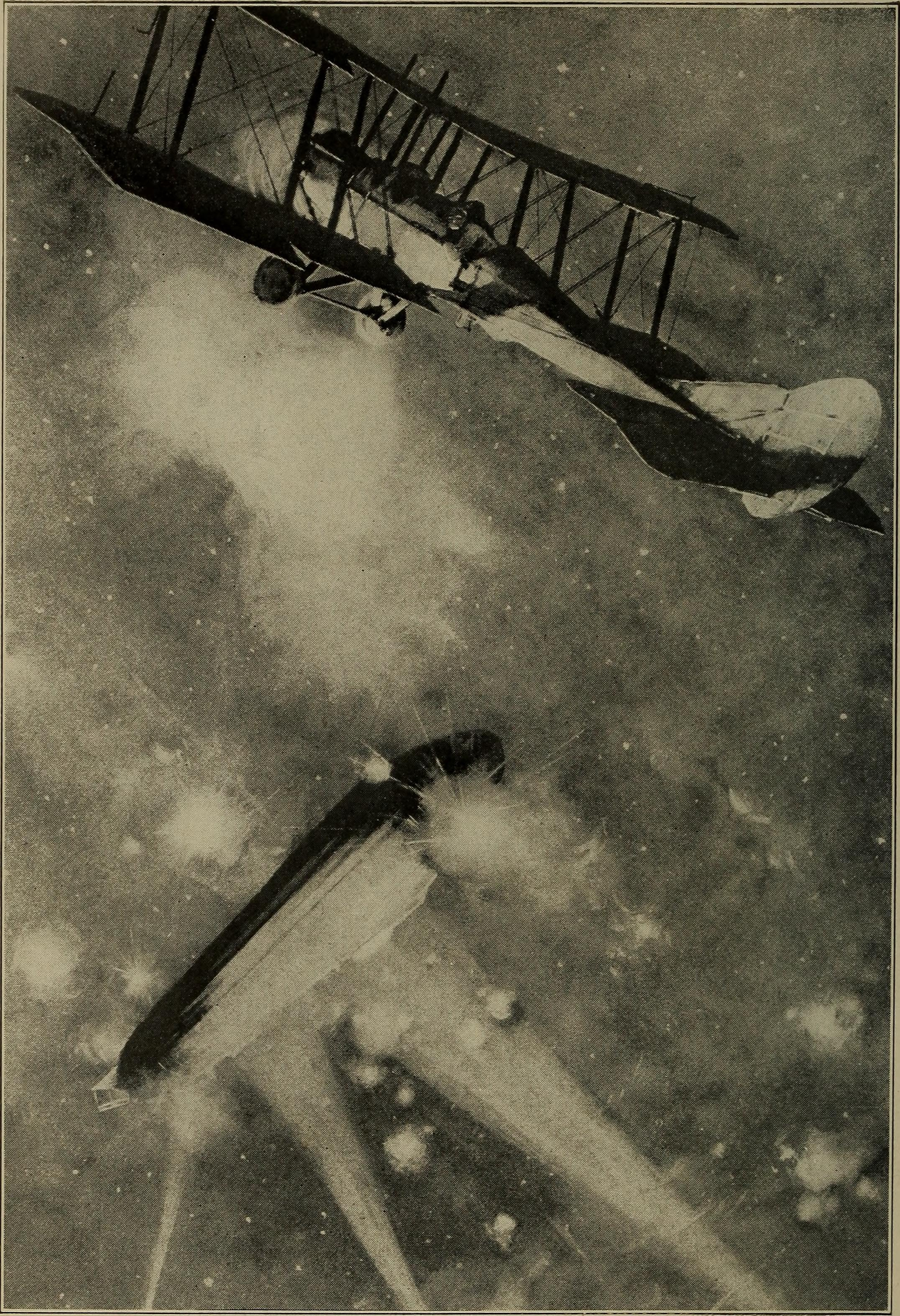
Pomeroy bullets were used by fighter aircraft attacking zeppelins.

The Pomeroy bullet was designed by New Zealander John Pomeroy (1873–1950) as an anti-zeppelin weapon. Pomeroy bullets were supposed to explode when encountering the minimal resistance of fabric envelopes containing hydrogen gas holding the zeppelin aloft. The explosion might produce a larger hole in the fabric than the small diameter bullet and the energy of the explosion might ignite the hydrogen in the presence of atmospheric oxygen outside the envelope.

== Background ==
World War I saw the first use of strategic bombing. The first bombers were Zeppelin airships flying at altitudes above the effective range of most defensive weapons. Fighter aircraft could reach the altitude of a Zeppelin but took a long time to do so and their weapons were machine guns firing rifle bullets which usually made only small holes in the zeppelin's fabric gas envelopes. The minimal pressure differential was insufficient to cause rapid loss of hydrogen contained within the fabric envelopes and the small quantities leaking from those holes produced minimal volumes of mixtures within flammability limits in the surrounding atmosphere. In the absence of ignition, damage was seldom enough to cause rapid loss of altitude. Several novel bullet designs were proposed to increase fabric damage or probability of ignition.

== Design ==
John Pomeroy was a bright youth with an exceptional aptitude for technical innovation. At the age of twelve, a hardware store paid him £50 for the design of a support to hold clothes lines above the ground without tipping to one side. Other inventions included a painless rabbit trap, a pneumatic horse collar, improved sheep shears, a fastener to keep ladies' hats in position, and pneumatic leg guards for cricket players. His proposal for dealing with zeppelin bombers was adopted in 1916 as the Cartridge S.A. Ball .303 inch Pomeroy Mark I. It was a standard .303 British cartridge loaded with a 155-grain (10.0 g) cupronickel-jacketed lead bullet including a hollow copper tube filled with 15 grains (0.97 g) of 73% dynamite. Pomeroy's wife reportedly filled the first five thousand bullets with dynamite by hand. In theory, the acceleration of firing the bullet caused the dynamite to separate with the stabilizing porous kieselgur settling toward the rear of the tube leaving a film of shock-sensitive nitroglycerine at the forward end of the tube. Later production designated Cartridge S.A. Ball PSA .303 inch Mark II used 60% dynamite with the forward tip of the copper tube closed and included a lead shot at the rear end of the tube to increase sensitivity. Archibald Low assisted with the testing of the bullets.

== Results ==
After inconclusive comparative testing, aircraft machine gun magazines for anti-Zeppelin missions were loaded with a mix of Pomeroy bullets, Brock bullets containing potassium chlorate explosive and incendiary Buckingham bullets containing pyrophoric yellow phosphorus. Fighter pilots reported firing passes causing bullet trajectories approximately parallel to the side of a zeppelin seemed more effective than penetrating bullet trajectories perpendicular to the gas envelope. There was disagreement about which bullet type might have ignited the comparatively few Zeppelins destroyed by fighter aircraft. Pomeroy bullets may be better remembered. After Brock was killed during the Zeebrugge Raid, Pomeroy promoted his design while receiving £25,000 for production of these bullets through World War I and entertained his customers with stories while selling pies from a horse-drawn cart in Melbourne through World War II.
