= Arthur Leyland Harrison =

VC recipient & England international rugby union player

- Born: 3 February 1886; Torquay, Devon
- Died: 23 April 1918 (aged 32); Zeebrugge, Belgium
- Military career
- Allegiance: United Kingdom
- Branch: Royal Navy
- Rank: Lieutenant-Commander
- Units: HMS Lion; HMS Vindictive
- Conflicts: World War I: Zeebrugge Raid †
- Awards: Victoria Cross; Mentioned in dispatches

Rugby union career
- Position: Forward
Senior career
Years	Team	Apps	(Points)
- USP
–	Royal Navy		
International career
Years	Team	Apps	(Points)
1914	England	2	

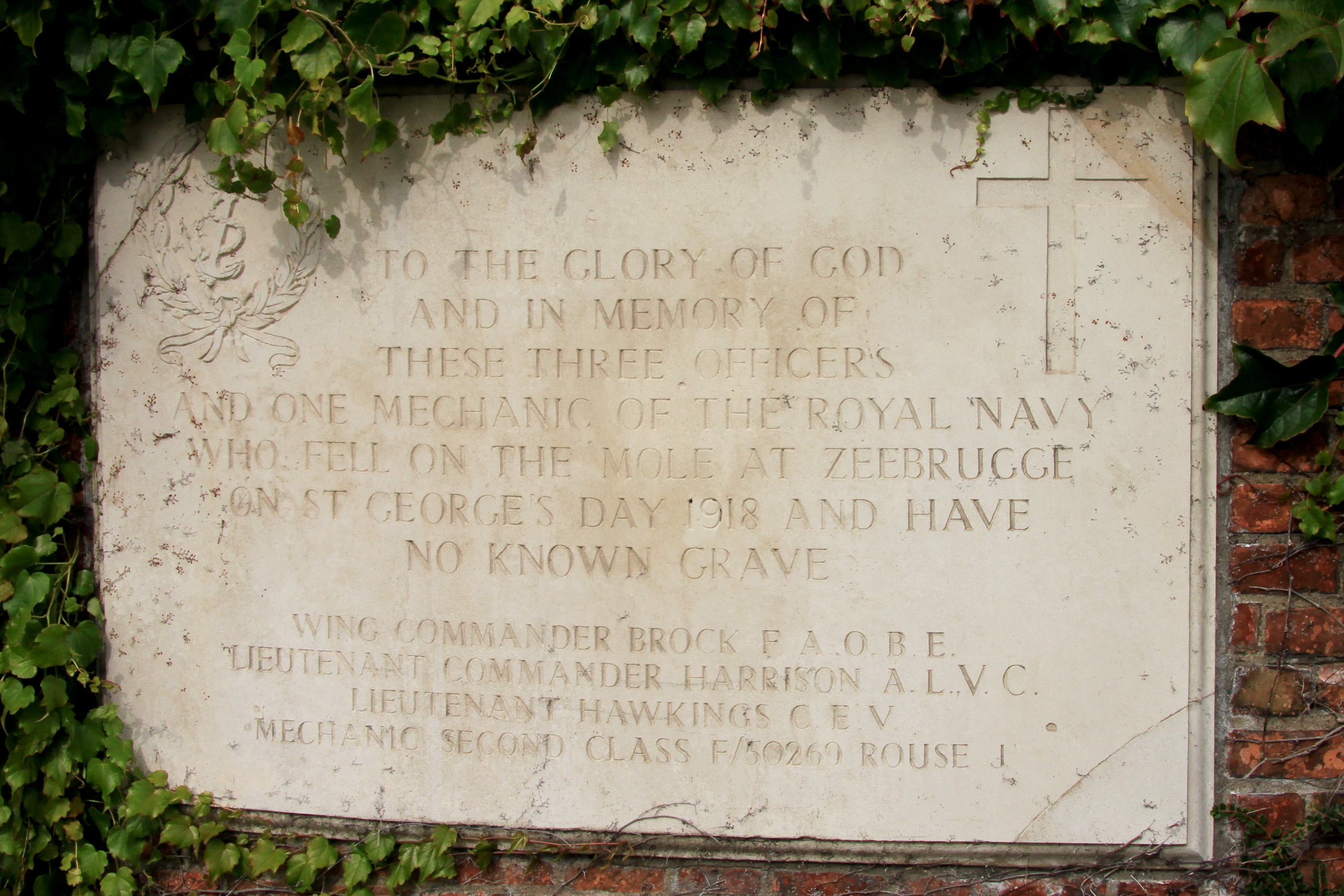
Zeebrugge Memorial. Inscription reads: TO THE GLORY OF GOD AND IN MEMORY OF THESE THREE OFFICERS AND ONE MECHANIC OF THE ROYAL NAVY WHO FELL ON THE MOLE AT ZEEBRUGGE ON ST GEORGE'S DAY 1918 AND HAVE NO KNOWN GRAVE WING COMMANDER BROCK F. A. O.B.E. LIEUTENANT COMMANDER HARRISON A. L. V.C. LIEUTENANT HAWKINGS C.E.V. MECHANIC SECOND CLASS F/50269 ROUSE J.

Lieutenant-Commander Arthur Leyland Harrison, VC (3 February 1886 – 23 April 1918) was an English Royal Navy officer, and World War I recipient of the Victoria Cross, the highest and most prestigious award for gallantry in the face of the enemy that can be awarded to British and Commonwealth forces.

== Early life ==
Harrison was born in Torquay, Devon, and educated at Brockhurst Preparatory School, where he is remembered every Armistice Day and at Dover College. At school Harrison was a tremendous all-round games player and, whilst in the Navy, he played rugby union and was capped twice for the England national rugby union team. He is the only England rugby union international to have been awarded the VC. Rugby league namesake Jack Harrison was also awarded the VC posthumously in 1917.

On 15 September 1902 he was posted as a naval cadet to the pre-dreadnought battleship Mars, serving in the Channel Squadron. The following month it was reported that he would be lent to the armoured cruiser Good Hope which was in the last stages of completion before her first commission in November.

== First World War ==
He served aboard the battlecruiser HMS Lion for most of the war, seeing action at the battle of Heligoland Bight in 1914 and battle of Dogger Bank in 1915. He also saw action at the Battle of Jutland in 1916, and was mentioned in despatches

=== Zeebrugge raid ===
The Zeebrugge Raid was an attack in April 1918 on the Belgian port of Zeebrugge to stop it being a base for German submarines. The raid was two actions: landing raiding parties on the mole from the obsolete cruiser HMS Vindictive and two ferries and the sinking of three old ships in the entrance of the harbour to block it. Vindictive was fitted with howitzers, flame-throwers and mortars so she could be used against the German defenders and as well as naval raiding parties carried two infantry companies of the 4th Battalion, Royal Marine Light Infantry .

The official citation for the award:

For most conspicuous gallantry at Zeebrugge on the night of the 22nd-23rd April, 1918. This officer was in immediate command of the Naval Storming Parties embarked in 'Vindictive'. Immediately before coming alongside the Mole Lieut.-Commander Harrison was struck on the head by a fragment of a shell which broke his jaw and knocked him senseless. Recovering consciousness he proceeded on to the Mole and took over command of his party, who were attacking the seaward end of the Mole. The silencing of the guns on the Mole head was of the first importance, and though in a position fully exposed to the enemy's machine-gun fire Lieut.-Commander Harrison gathered his men together and led them to the attack. He was killed at the head of his men, all of whom were either killed or wounded. Lieut.-Commander Harrison, though already severely wounded and undoubtedly in great pain, displayed indomitable resolution and courage of the highest order in pressing his attack, knowing as he did that any delay in silencing the guns might jeopardise the main object of the expedition, i.e., the blocking of the Zeebrugge-Bruges Canal.

His body was never recovered. He, along with three others who were missing in action on the Zeebrugge raid, are commemorated on the Zeebrugge Memorial, at the Zeebrugge Churchyard. He is also commemorated by a brass plaque, mounted in the Warrior Chapel at St Mary's Wimbledon.

George Bradford who led the raiding parties from the ferry Iris II was also awarded a posthumous VC for his actions in the raid.

== The Medal ==
His mother Adelaide Ellen Harrison, who lived in Wimbledon, London, received the VC and in 1967 relatives donated it to the Britannia Royal Naval College, Dartmouth, Devon where it is on public display.

== See also ==
- Albert Edward McKenzie
- List of international rugby union players killed in action during the First World War
