= Mae Jemison =

American astronaut, physician and engineer (born 1956)

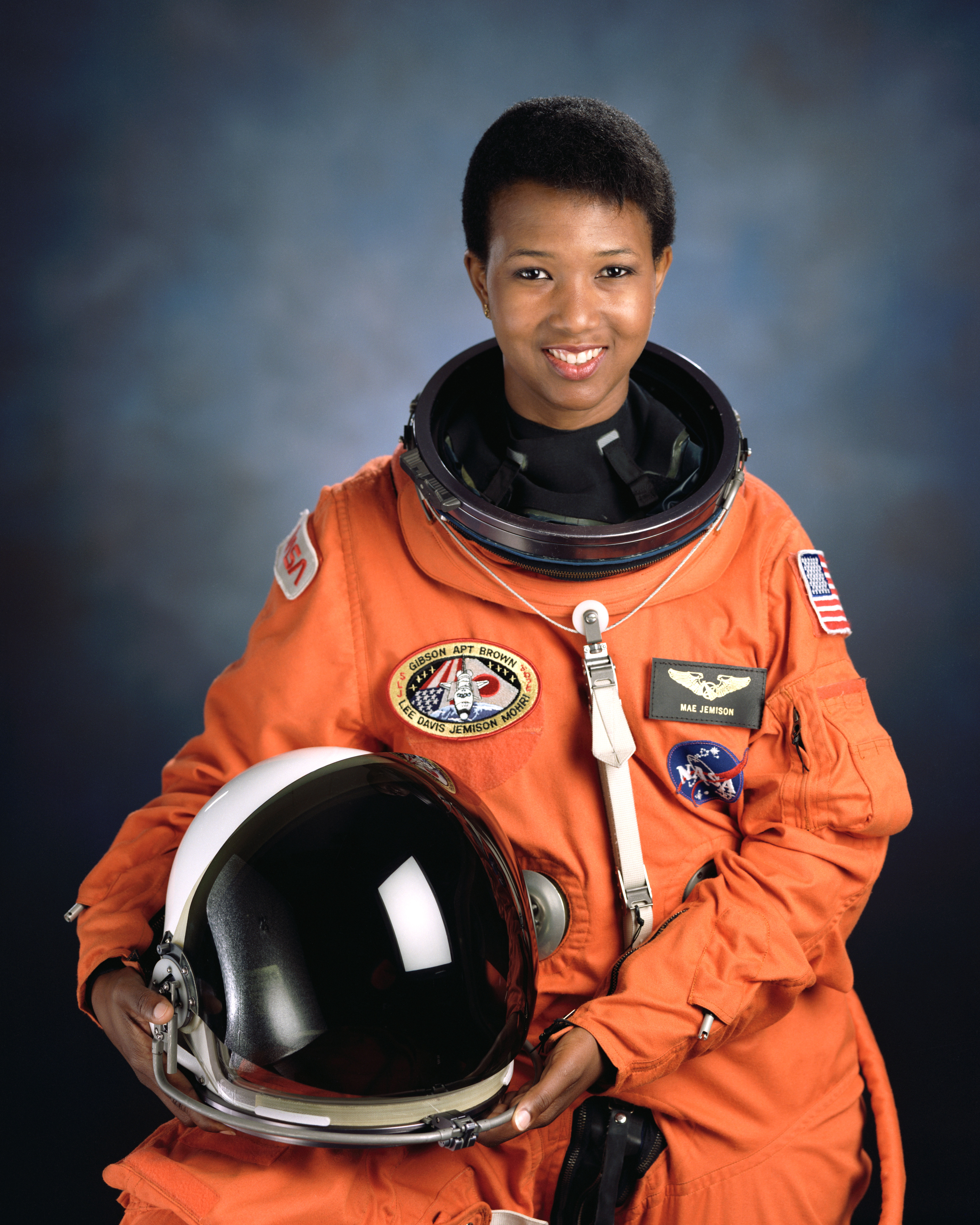
- Jemison in July 1992
- Born: Mae Carol Jemison; October 17, 1956 (age 70); Decatur, Alabama, U.S.
- Education: Stanford University (BA, BS); Cornell University (MD)
- Space career

NASA astronaut
- Time in space: 7d 22h 30m
- Selection: NASA Group 12 (1987)
- Mission: STS-47
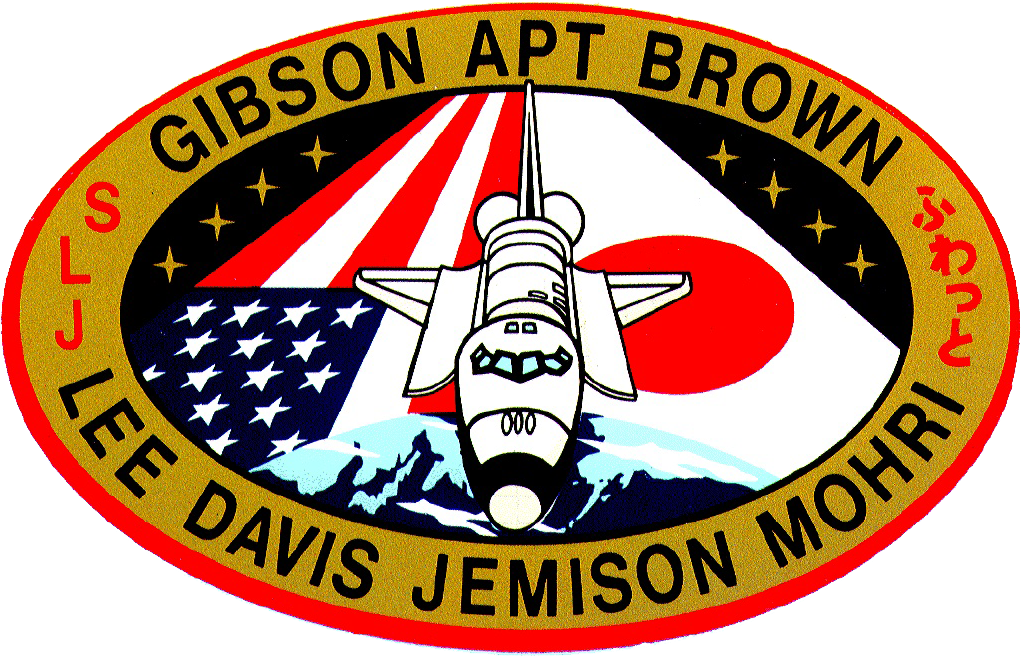
- Mission insignia
- Retired: March 1993

Mae Carol Jemison (born October 17, 1956) is an American engineer, physician, and former NASA astronaut. She became the first African-American woman to travel into space when she served as a mission specialist aboard the Space Shuttle Endeavour in 1992. Jemison joined NASA's astronaut corps in 1987 and was selected for the STS-47 mission, during which the Endeavour orbited the Earth for nearly eight days on September 12–20, 1992.

Born in Alabama and raised in Chicago, Jemison graduated from Stanford University with degrees in chemical engineering and African and African-American studies. She then earned her medical degree from Cornell University. Jemison served as a doctor for the Peace Corps in Liberia and Sierra Leone from 1983 until 1985 and worked as a general practitioner. In pursuit of becoming an astronaut, she applied to NASA.

Jemison left NASA in 1993 and founded a technology research company. She later formed a non-profit educational foundation and, through the foundation, is the principal of the 100 Year Starship project funded by DARPA. Jemison has also written several books for children and appeared on television, including in a 1993 episode of Star Trek: The Next Generation. She holds several honorary doctorates and has been inducted into the National Women's Hall of Fame and the International Space Hall of Fame.

== Early life ==
Mae Carol Jemison was born in Decatur, Alabama, on October 17, 1956, the youngest of three children of Charlie Jemison and Dorothy Jemison (née Green). Her father was a maintenance supervisor for a charity organization, and her mother worked most of her career as an elementary school teacher of English and math at the Ludwig van Beethoven Elementary School in Chicago, Illinois. The family first lived in the Woodlawn and later the Morgan Park neighborhoods. Jemison knew from a young age that she wanted to study science and someday go into space. The television show Star Trek and, in particular, African-American actress Nichelle Nichols' portrayal of Lieutenant Uhura further stoked her interest in space.

Jemison enjoyed studying nature and human physiology, using her observations to learn more about science. Although her mother encouraged her curiosity and both her parents were supportive of her interest in science, she did not always see the same support from her teachers. When Jemison told a kindergarten teacher she wanted to be a scientist when she grew up, the teacher assumed she meant she wanted to be a nurse. Seeing a lack of female astronauts during the Apollo missions also frustrated Jemison. She later recalled, "everybody was thrilled about space, but I remember being really really irritated that there were no women astronauts."

Jemison began studying ballet at the age of 8 or 9 and entered high school at 12 years old, where she joined the cheerleading team and the Modern Dance Club. Jemison had a great love for dance from a young age. She learned several styles of dance, including African and Japanese, as well as ballet, jazz, and modern dance. As a child, Jemison had aspirations of becoming a professional dancer. At the age of 14, she auditioned for the leading role of Maria in West Side Story. She did not get the leading role but was selected as a background dancer.

After graduating from Chicago's Morgan Park High School in 1973, Jemison entered Stanford University at the age of 16. Although she was young to be leaving home for college, Jemison later said it did not faze her because she was "naive and stubborn enough". There were very few other African-American students in Jemison's classes and she continued to experience discrimination from her teachers. In an interview with The Des Moines Register in 2008, Jemison said that it was difficult to go to Stanford at 16 but that her youthful arrogance may have helped her; she asserted that some arrogance is necessary for women and minorities to be successful in a white male dominated society.

At Stanford, Jemison served as head of the Black Students Union. She also choreographed a musical and dance production called Out of the Shadows. During her senior year in college, she struggled with the choice between going to medical school or pursuing a career as a professional dancer after graduation; she graduated from Stanford in 1977, receiving a B.S. degree in chemical engineering and B.A. degree in African and African-American studies. While at Stanford, she also pursued studies related to her childhood interest in space and first considered applying to NASA.

== Medical career ==
Jemison attended Cornell Medical School and, during her training, traveled to Cuba to conduct a study funded by the American Medical Student Association and to Thailand, where she worked at a Cambodian refugee camp. She also worked for Flying Doctors stationed in East Africa. During her years at Cornell, Jemison continued to study dance by enrolling in classes at the Alvin Ailey American Dance Theater. After graduating with an M.D. degree in 1981, she interned at Los Angeles County-USC Medical Center in 1982, and worked as a general practitioner for Ross–Loos Medical Group.

Mae Jemison being fitted for a spacesuit and doing an experiment in space

Jemison joined the staff of the Peace Corps in 1983 and served as a medical officer until 1985. She was responsible for the health of Peace Corps volunteers serving in Liberia and Sierra Leone. Jemison supervised the Peace Corps' pharmacy, laboratory, and medical staff, as well as providing medical care, writing self-care manuals, and developing and implementing guidelines for health and safety issues. She also worked with the Centers for Disease Control helping with research for various vaccines.

== NASA career ==
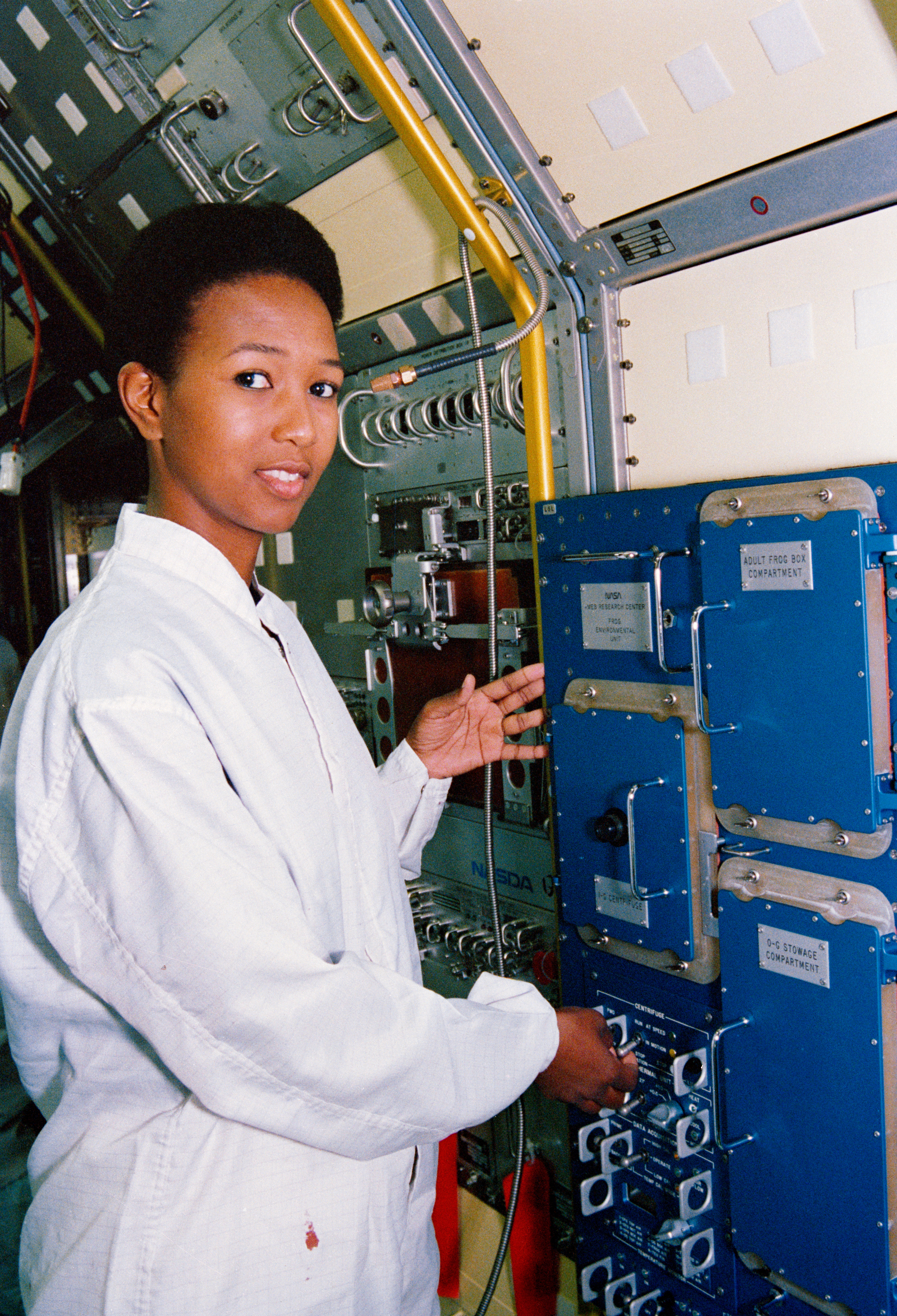
Jemison at the Kennedy Space Center in 1992

Upon returning to the United States after serving in the Peace Corps, Jemison settled in Los Angeles, California. In Los Angeles, she entered into private practice and took graduate-level engineering courses. Inspired by the flights of Sally Ride and Guion Bluford in 1983, Jemison applied to the astronaut program in October 1985. After NASA postponed the selection of new candidates following the Space Shuttle Challenger disaster in 1986, Jemison reapplied in 1987. She was chosen out of roughly 2,000 applicants for 15 slots in NASA Astronaut Group 12, the first selected after Challenger. The Associated Press covered her as the "first black woman astronaut" in 1987. CBS featured Jemison as one of the country's "most eligible singles" on Best Catches, a television special hosted by Phylicia Rashad and Robb Weller in 1989.

Jemison's work with NASA before her shuttle launch included launch support activities at the Kennedy Space Center in Florida and verification of Shuttle computer software in the Shuttle Avionics Integration Laboratory (SAIL). On September 28, 1989, she was selected to join the STS-47 crew as Mission Specialist 4 and was also designated Science Mission Specialist, a new astronaut role being tested by NASA to focus on scientific experiments.

=== STS-47 ===
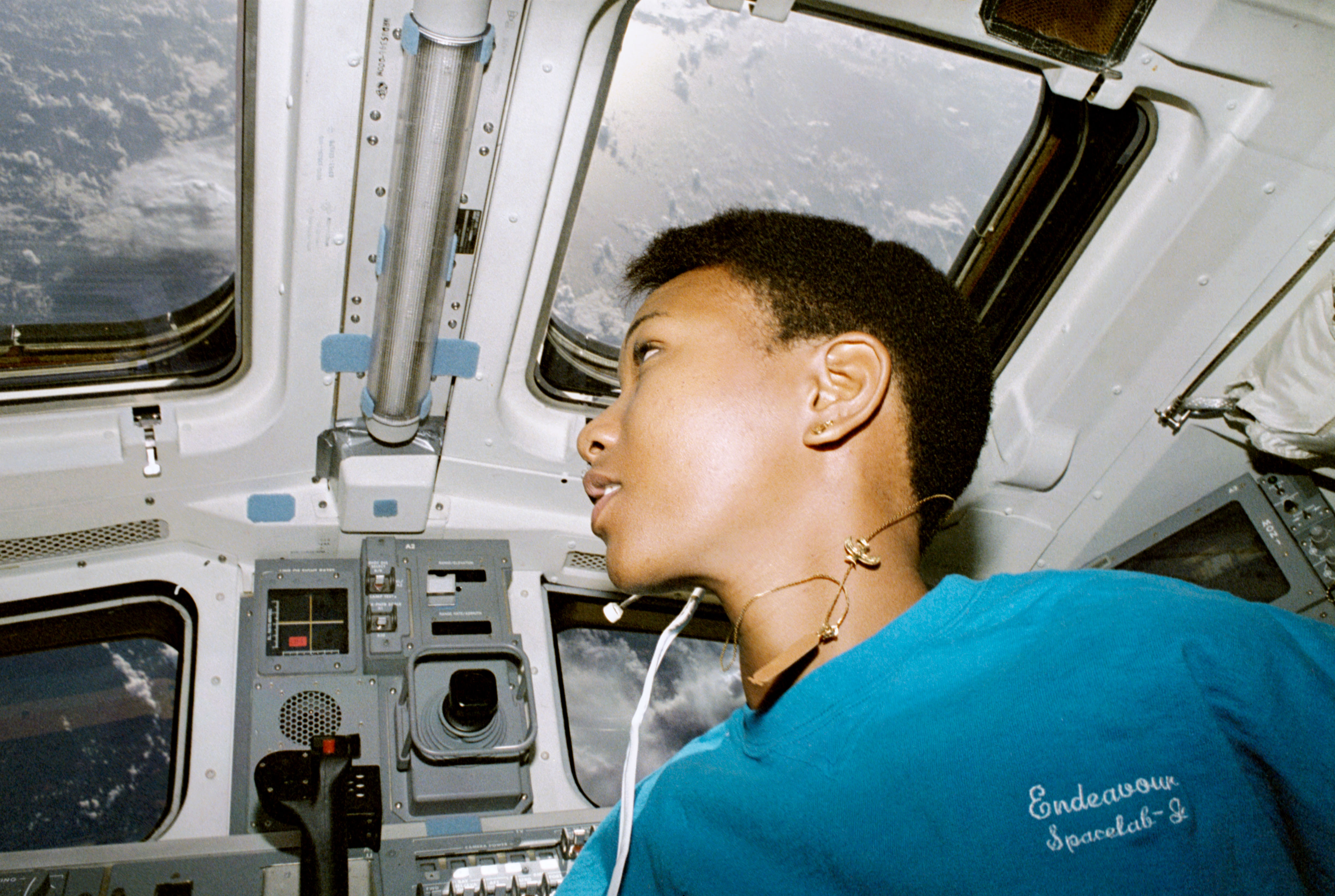
Jemison during Space Shuttle mission STS-47

Jemison flew her only space mission from September 12 to 20, 1992, as one of the seven-member crew aboard Space Shuttle Endeavour, on mission STS-47, a cooperative mission between the United States and Japan, as well as the 50th shuttle mission. Jemison logged 190 hours, 30 minutes, 23 seconds in space and orbited the earth 127 times. The crew was split into two shifts with Jemison assigned to the Blue Shift. Throughout the eight-day mission, she began communications on her shift with the salute "Hailing frequencies open", a quote from Star Trek. Jemison took a poster from the Alvin Ailey American Dance Theater along with her on the flight. She also took a West African statuette and a photo of pioneering aviator Bessie Coleman, the first African American with an international pilot license.

STS-47 carried the Spacelab Japan module, a cooperative mission between the United States and Japan that included 43 Japanese and United States life science and materials processing experiments. Jemison and Japanese astronaut Mamoru Mohri were trained to use the Autogenic Feedback Training Exercise (AFTE), a technique developed by Patricia S. Cowings that uses biofeedback and autogenic training to help patients monitor and control their physiology as a possible treatment for motion sickness, anxiety and stress-related disorders.

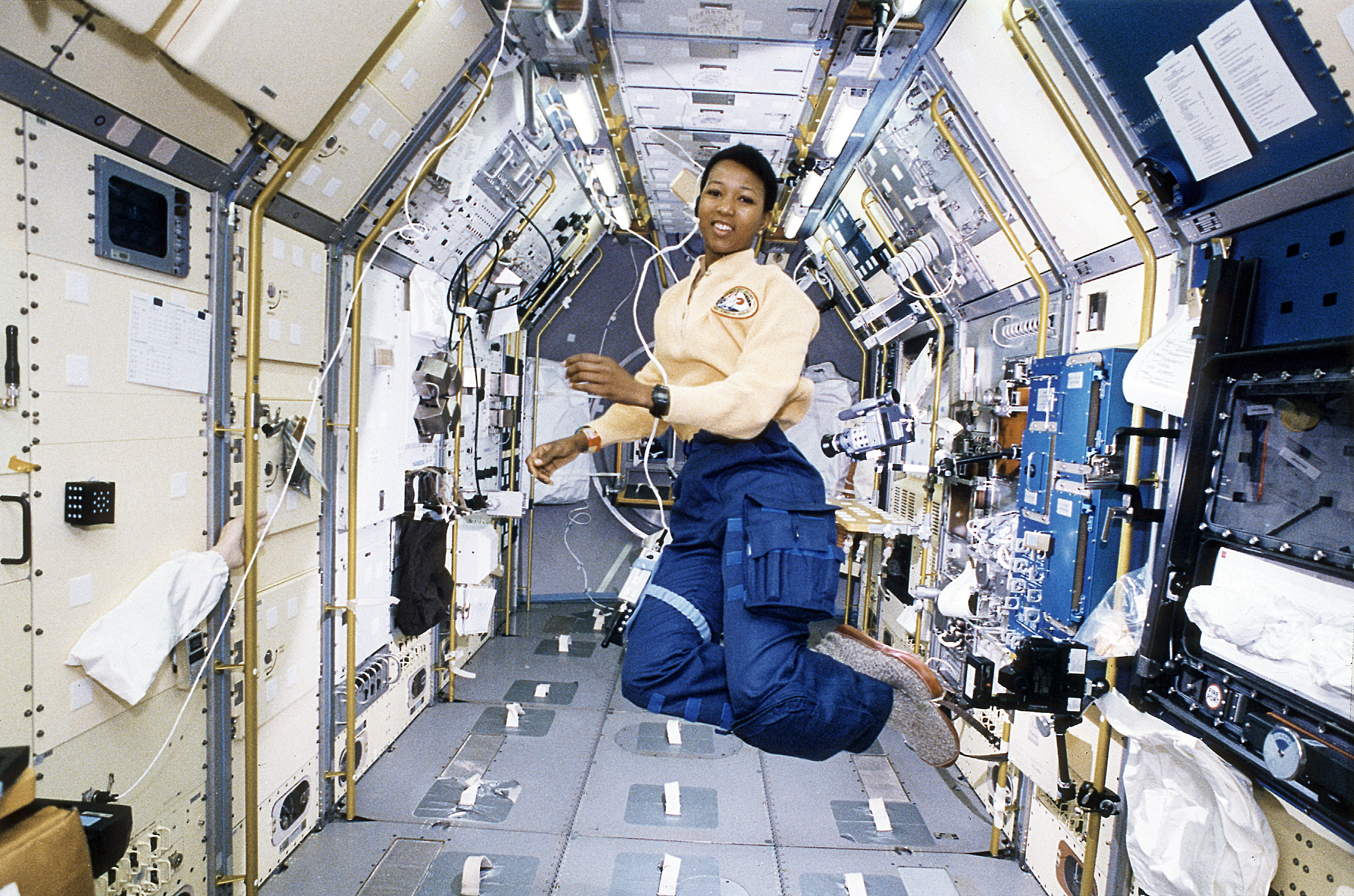
Jemison aboard the Spacelab Japan module on Endeavour

Aboard the Spacelab Japan module, Jemison tested NASA's Fluid Therapy System, a set of procedures and equipment to produce water for injection, developed by Sterimatics Corporation. She then used IV bags and a mixing method, developed by Baxter Healthcare, to use the water from the previous step to produce saline solution in space. Jemison was also a co-investigator of two bone cell research experiments. Another experiment she participated in was to induce female frogs to ovulate, fertilize the eggs, and then see how tadpoles developed in zero gravity.

=== Resignation from NASA ===
Jemison resigned from NASA in March 1993 to start a company. NASA training manager and author Homer Hickam, who had trained Jemison for her flight, later expressed some regret that she had departed.

== Post-NASA career ==
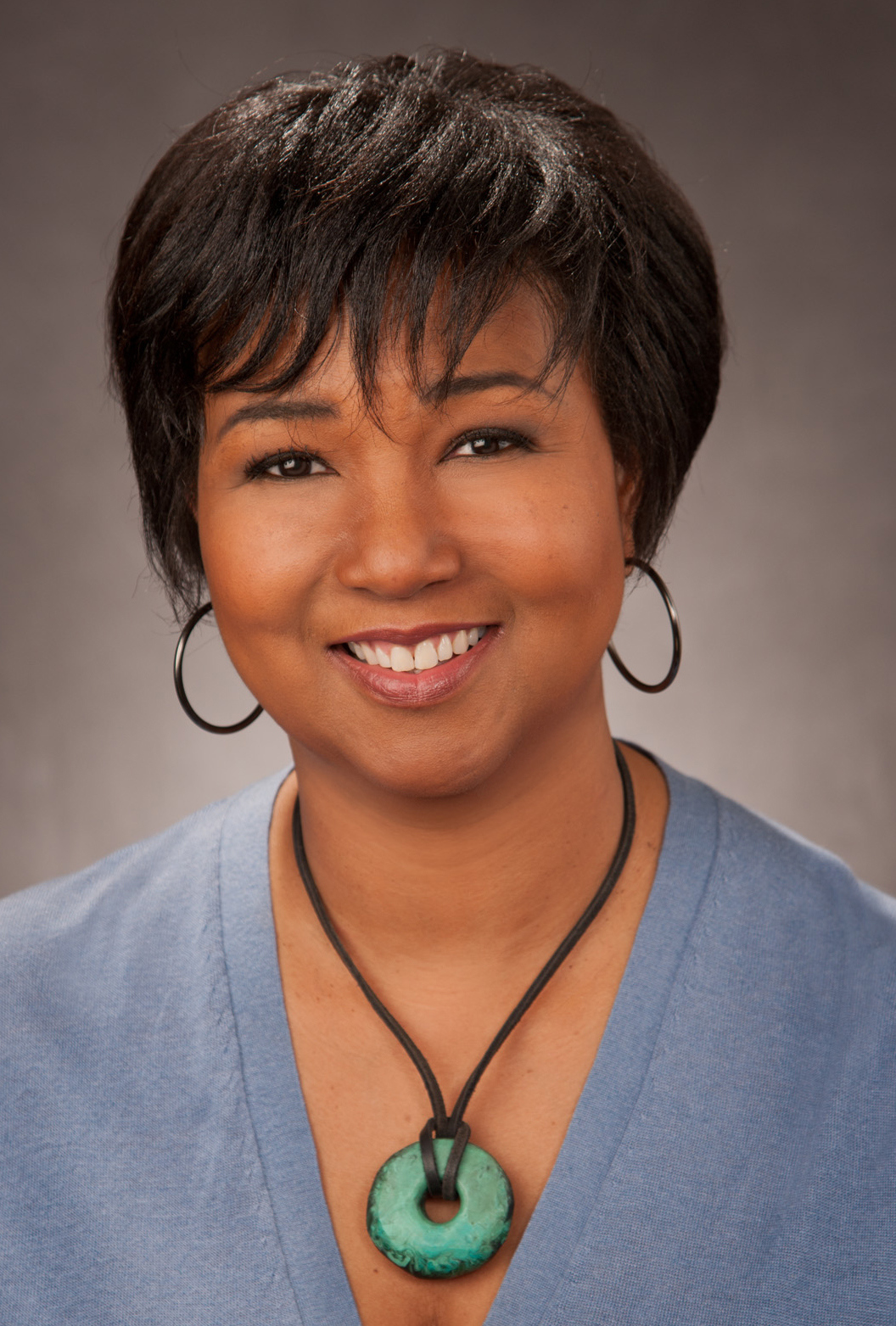
Jemison in 2013

Jemison served on the board of directors of the World Sickle Cell Foundation from 1990 to 1992. In 1993, she founded The Jemison Group Inc., a consulting firm which considers the sociocultural impact of technological advancements and design.

Jemison also founded the Dorothy Jemison Foundation for Excellence, naming it in honor of her mother. One of the projects of the foundation is The Earth We Share, a science camp for students aged 12 to 16. Founded in 1994, camps have been held at Dartmouth College, Colorado School of Mines, Choate Rosemary Hall, and other sites in the United States, as well as internationally in South Africa, Tunisia, and Switzerland. Jemison stated that the goal of these four-week long, residential programs is to increase scientific literacy by developing the students’ abilities in both critical thinking and problem solving. Students accomplish this by working in teams and using the scientific method to identify and solve a real problem facing their communities. The Dorothy Jemison Foundation also sponsors other events and programs, including the Shaping the World essay competition, Listening to the Future (a survey program that targets obtaining opinions from students), Earth Online (an online chatroom that allows students to safely communicate and discuss ideas on space and science), and the Reality Leads Fantasy Gala.

Jemison was a professor of environmental studies at Dartmouth College from 1995 to 2002 where she directed the Jemison Institute for Advancing Technology in Developing Countries. In 1999, she also became an Andrew D. White Professor-at-Large at Cornell University from 1999 to 2005. Jemison continues to advocate strongly in favor of science education and getting minority students interested in science. She is a member of various scientific organizations, such as the American Medical Association, the American Chemical Society, the Association of Space Explorers, and the American Association for the Advancement of Science.

In 1999, Jemison founded BioSentient Corp and obtained the license to commercialize AFTE, the technique she and Mohri tested on themselves during STS-47.

In 2012, Jemison made the winning bid for the DARPA 100 Year Starship project through the Dorothy Jemison Foundation for Excellence. The Dorothy Jemison Foundation for Excellence was awarded a $500,000 grant for further work. The new organization maintained the organizational name 100 Year Starship. Jemison is the current principal of the 100 Year Starship.

In 2018, she collaborated with Bayer Crop Science and the National 4-H Council for the initiative named Science Matters, which was aimed at encouraging young children to understand and pursue agricultural sciences.

== Books ==
Jemison's first book, Find Where the Wind Goes (2001), is a memoir of her life written for children. She describes her childhood, her time at Stanford, in the Peace Corps, and as an astronaut. School Library Journal found the stories about her earlier life to be the most appealing. Book Report found that the autobiography gave a realistic view into her interactions with her professors, whose treatment of her was not based on her intelligence but on stereotypes of woman of color.

Her A True Book series of four children's books published in 2013 is co-authored with Dana Meachen Rau. Each book in the series has a "Find the Truth" challenge, true or false questions answers to which are revealed at the end of the story. School Library Journal found the series to be "properly tantalizing surveys" of the Solar System but criticized the inclusion of a few outdated theories in physics and astronomy.

== Public profile ==
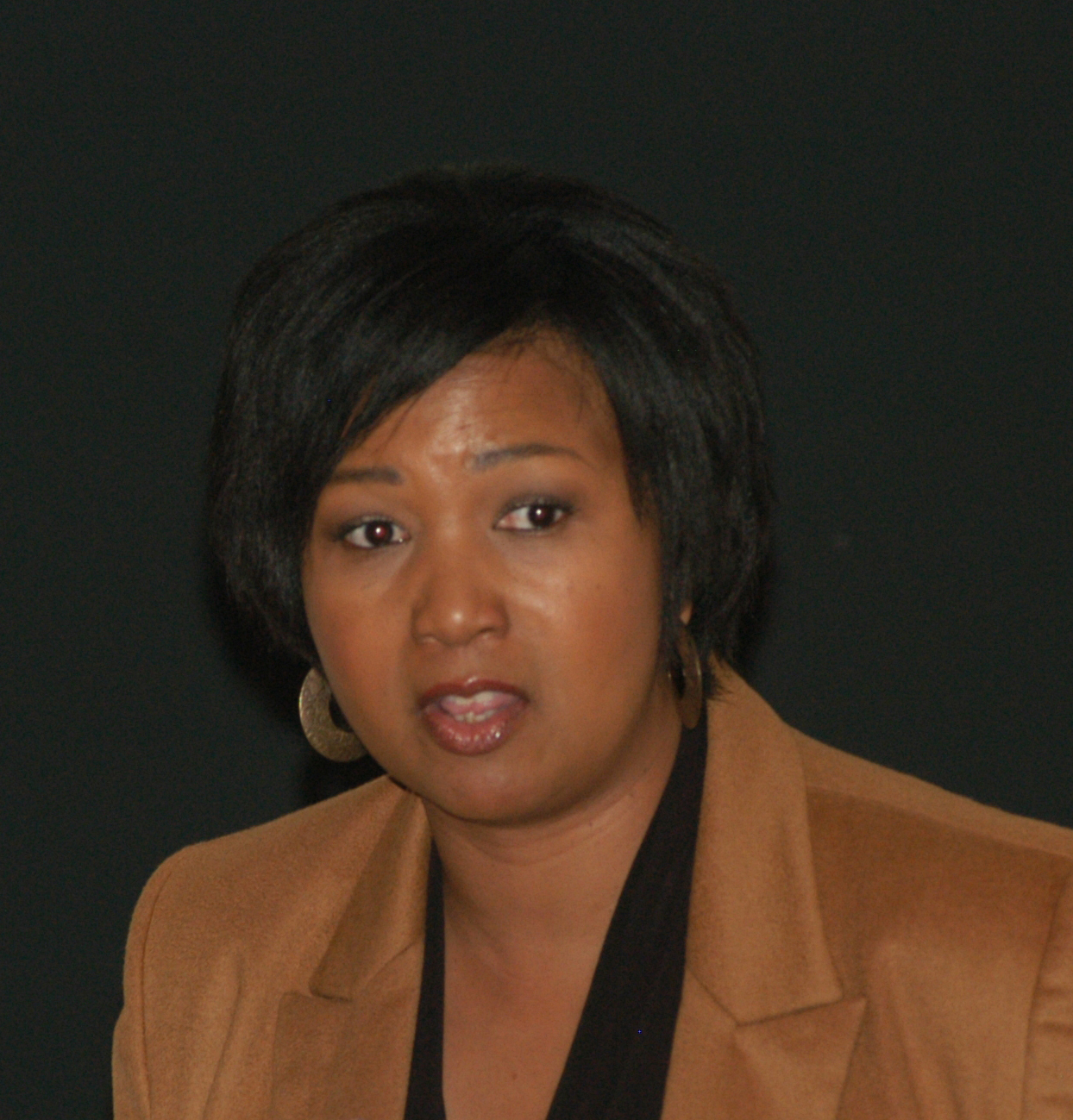
Jemison at a symposium in 2009

LeVar Burton learned that Jemison was an avid Star Trek fan and asked her if she would be interested in being on the show. In 1993, Jemison appeared as Lieutenant Palmer in "Second Chances", an episode of the science fiction television series Star Trek: The Next Generation, becoming the first real-life astronaut to appear on Star Trek.

From 1999 to 2005, Jemison was appointed an Andrew Dickson White Professor-at-Large at Cornell University.

Jemison is an active public speaker who appears before private and public groups promoting science and technology. "Having been an astronaut gives me a platform," says Jemison, "but I'd blow it if I just talked about the Shuttle." Jemison uses her platform to speak out on the gap in the quality of health-care between the United States and the developing world, saying that "Martin Luther King [Jr.] ... didn't just have a dream, he got things done." Jemison has also appeared as host and technical consultant of the science series World of Wonder which aired on the Discovery Channel from 1994 to 1998.

In 2006, Jemison participated in African American Lives, a PBS television miniseries hosted by Henry Louis Gates Jr., that traces the family history of eight famous African Americans using historical research and genetic techniques. Jemison found to her surprise that she is 13% East Asian in her genetic makeup. She also learned that some of her paternal ancestors were slaves at a plantation in Talladega County, Alabama.

Jemison participated in the Red Dress Heart Truth fashion show, wearing Lyn Devon, during the 2007 New York Fashion Week to help raise money to fight heart disease. In May of the same year, she was the graduation commencement speaker and only the 11th person in the 52-year history of Harvey Mudd College to be awarded an honorary D.Eng. degree.

On February 17, 2008, Jemison was the featured speaker for the 100th anniversary of the founding of Alpha Kappa Alpha, the first sorority established by African-American college women. Jemison paid tribute to Alpha Kappa Alpha by carrying the sorority's banner with her on her shuttle flight. Her space suit is a part of the sorority's national traveling Centennial Exhibit. Jemison is an honorary member of Alpha Kappa Alpha.

Jemison participated with First Lady Michelle Obama in a forum for promising girls in the Washington, D.C. public schools in March 2009.

In 2014, Jemison also appeared at Wayne State University for their annual Dr. Martin Luther King Jr. Tribute Luncheon. In 2016, she partnered with Bayer Corporation to promote and advance science literacy in schools, emphasizing hands-on experimentation.

She took part in Michigan State University's lecture series, "Slavery to Freedom: An American Odyssey", in February 2017. In May 2017, Jemison gave the commencement speech at Rice University. She discussed the 100 Year Plan, science and education and other topics at Western Michigan University also in May 2017.

In 2017, LEGO released the "Women of NASA" set, with minifigures of Jemison, Margaret Hamilton, Sally Ride, and Nancy Grace Roman. The Google Doodle on March 8, 2019 (International Women's Day) featured a quote from Jemison: "Never be limited by other people's limited imaginations."

On October 22, 2026, Jemison signed on as a co-producer for Galileo a Broadway musical alongside Bill Nye and Neil deGrasse Tyson. The musical will be starting performances on November 10, 2026 at the Shubert Theatre. Regarding her involvement, Jemison stated: "Long before I went into space, dance, science, the arts, and the stars above were major focal points of my life."

== Personal life ==
Jemison built a dance studio in her home and has choreographed and produced several shows of modern jazz and African dance.

In the spring of 1996, Jemison filed a complaint against a Texas police officer, accusing him of police brutality during a traffic stop that ended in her arrest. She was pulled over by Nassau Bay police officer Henry Hughes for allegedly making an illegal U-turn and arrested after Hughes learned of an outstanding warrant on Jemison for a speeding ticket. In the process of arresting her, the officer twisted her wrist and forced her to the ground, as well as having her walk barefoot from the patrol car into the police station. In her complaint, Jemison said the officer physically and emotionally mistreated her. Jemison's attorney said she believed she had already paid the speeding ticket years before. She spent several hours in jail and was treated at an area hospital after release for deep bruises and a head injury. The Nassau Bay officer was suspended with pay pending an investigation, but the police investigation cleared him of wrongdoing. She filed a lawsuit against the city of Nassau Bay and the officer.

== Honors and awards ==
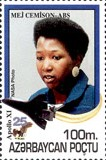
Jemison on 1996 Azeri postage stamp

- 1988 Essence Science and Technology Award
- 1990 Gamma Sigma Sigma Woman of the Year
- 1991 McCall's 10 Outstanding Women for the 90s
- 1992 Johnson Publications Black Achievement Trailblazers Award
- 1992 Ebony Black Achievement Award
- 1993 National Women's Hall of Fame
- 1993 Ebony magazine 50 Most Influential women
- 1993 Kilby Science Award
- 1993 Montgomery Fellow, Dartmouth College
- 1993 People magazine's "50 Most Beautiful People in the World"
- 1993 Turner Trumpet Award
- 2002 listed among the 100 Greatest African Americans according to Molefi Kete Asante
- 2002 Texas Women's Hall of Fame inductee
- 2003 Intrepid Award by the National Organization for Girls
- 2004 International Space Hall of Fame
- 2005 The National Audubon Society, Rachel Carson Award
- 2017 Buzz Aldrin Space Pioneer Award
- 2019 Florida Southern College Honorary Chancellor
- 2021 Sylvanus Thayer Award from the United States Military Academy

=== Institutions ===
- 1992 Mae C. Jemison Science and Space Museum, Wilbur Wright College, Chicago, Illinois
- 1992 Mae C. Jemison Academy, an alternative public school in Detroit, Michigan
- 2001 Mae Jemison School, an elementary public school in Hazel Crest, Illinois
- 2007 Bluford Drew Jemison STEM Academy, a public charter school in Baltimore, Maryland (closed in 2013)
- 2010 Bluford Drew Jemison STEM Academy West, a Middle/High School in Baltimore, Maryland
- 2013 Jemison High School, Huntsville, Alabama

=== Honorary doctorates ===
- 1991 Doctor of Letters, Winston-Salem College, North Carolina
- 1991 Doctor of Science, Lincoln College, Pennsylvania
- 2000 Doctor of Humanities, Princeton University
- 2005 Doctor of Science, Wilson College, North Carolina
- 2006 Doctor of Science, Dartmouth College
- 2007 Doctor of Engineering, Harvey Mudd College
- 2007 Doctor of Engineering, Rensselaer Polytechnic Institute
- 2008 Doctor of Humanities, DePaul University
- 2009 Doctor of Engineering, Polytechnic Institute of NYU
- 2019 Doctor of Humane Letters, Florida Southern College
- 2019 Doctor of Humane Letters, University of Arizona
- 2020 Doctor Honoris Causa, KU Leuven
- 2022 Doctor of Science, Washington University in St. Louis
- 2022 Doctor of Science, Clarkson University
- 2023 Doctor of Engineering, University College Dublin
- 2026 Doctor of Science, Rochester Institute of Technology

== Filmography ==
- Star Trek: The Next Generation (1993) – Lieutenant Palmer, episode "Second Chances"
- Susan B. Anthony Slept Here (1995) – herself
- Star Trek: 30 Years and Beyond (1996) – herself
- The New Explorers (1998) – episode "Endeavor"
- How William Shatner Changed the World (2005) – herself
- African American Lives (2006) – herself
- No Gravity (2011) – herself
- The Real (2016) – herself
- Moon Girl and Devil Dinosaur (2023) – Skipster (voice), episode "Skip Ad...olescense"

== Publications ==
- Jemison, Mae (2001). S.E.E.ing the Future: Science, Engineering and Education (PDF). Hanover, NH: Dartmouth College. p. 56. ERIC ED464816.
- She contributed the piece "Outer Space: The Worldly Frontier" to the 2003 anthology Sisterhood Is Forever: The Women's Anthology for a New Millennium, edited by Robin Morgan.

=== Books ===
- Jemison, Mae (2001). Find Where the Wind Goes: Moments from My Life. New York: Scholastic. ISBN 978-0-439-13196-4. OCLC 44548911.
- Jemison, Mae; Rau, Dana Meachen (2013). Journey Through Our Solar System (True Books: Dr. Mae Jemison and 100 Year Starship). Scholastic. ISBN 978-0-531-24061-8.
- Jemison, Mae; Rau, Dana Meachen (2013). Discovering New Planets (True Books: Dr. Mae Jemison and 100 Year Starship). Scholastic. ISBN 978-0-531-24063-2.
- Jemison, Mae; Rau, Dana Meachen (2013). Exploring Our Sun (True Books: Dr. Mae Jemison and 100 Year Starship). Scholastic. ISBN 978-0-531-24062-5.
- Jemison, Mae; Rau, Dana Meachen (2013). The 100 Year Starship (True Books: Dr. Mae Jemison and 100 Year Starship). Scholastic. ISBN 978-0-531-24060-1.

== See also ==
- List of African-American astronauts
