= List of inductees in the International Space Hall of Fame =

This is a list of the inductees to the International Space Hall of Fame at the New Mexico Museum of Space History, in the city of Alamogordo, New Mexico, United States.

The inaugural class consisted of 35 inductees. An initial list of candidates was generated by the International Academy of Astronautics and the final choices were made by the New Mexico Governor's Committee of the International Space Hall of Fame.

Most inductees join the hall of fame in October, but Jack Lousma and Gordon Fullerton were inducted in March 1982 at the runway where their shuttle landed. There was no induction ceremony in 1986; it was replaced with a dedication ceremony for a memorial garden honoring the people who died in the Space Shuttle Challenger disaster. In 2013, the Delta Clipper Experimental team became the first group (rather than individuals) to be inducted into the hall of fame.

== A–G ==
- Buzz Aldrin, U.S. (1982)
- Paul Allen, U.S.
- William Anders, U.S. (1983)
- Clinton Presba Anderson, U.S. (1977)
- Anousheh Ansari, Iran
- Neil Armstrong, U.S. (1976)
- Alan Bean, U.S. (1983)
- Anatoli Blagonravov, USSR (1976)
- Guion Bluford, U.S. (1997)
- Charles Bolden, U.S. (1997)
- Chesley Bonestell, U.S. (1989)
- Frank Borman, U.S. (1982)
- Karel Bossart, Belgium/U.S. (1990)
- Vance D. Brand, U.S. (1996)
- Dirk Brouwer, U.S. (1984)
- Scott Carpenter, U.S. (1981)
- Eugene Cernan, U.S. (1982)
- Roger B. Chaffee, U.S. (1983)
- Arthur C. Clarke, UK (1989)
- Eileen Collins, U.S. (2001)
- Michael Collins, U.S. (1977)
- William Congreve, UK (1979)
- Pete Conrad, U.S. (1982)
- Gordon Cooper, U.S. (1981)
- Nicolaus Copernicus, Poland (1995)
- Robert Crippen, U.S. (1991)
- Gaetano Crocco, Italy (1976)
- Walter Cronkite, U.S. (1996)
- Albert Scott Crossfield, U.S. (1988)
- Walter Cunningham, U.S. (1983)
- Louis Damblanc, France (1976)
- Delta Clipper Experimental, U.S.
- Peter Diamandis, U.S.
- Walt Disney, U.S.
- Edward Dittmer, U.S. (2001)
- William Douglas, U.S. (1992)
- Charles Stark Draper, U.S. (1976)
- Hugh Latimer Dryden, U.S. (1976)
- Charles Duke, U.S. (1983)
- Donn F. Eisele, U.S. (1983)
- Joe Engle, U.S.
- Robert Esnault-Pelterie, France (1976)
- Ronald Evans, U.S. (1983)
- Maxime Faget, U.S. (1990)
- James C. Fletcher, U.S. (1992)
- Allen Fuhs, U.S. (1992)
- C. Gordon Fullerton, U.S. (1982)
- Andrew (Drew) Gaffney, U.S. (1996)
- Yuri Gagarin, USSR (1976)
- Galileo Galilei, Italy (1991)
- Hermann Ganswindt, Germany (1976)
- Marc Garneau, Canada (1992)
- Robert R. Gilruth, U.S. (1976)
- John Glenn, U.S. (1977)
- Robert H. Goddard, U.S. (1976)
- Daniel Goldin, U.S. (2001)
- Richard F. Gordon, Jr., U.S. (1982)
- Gus Grissom, U.S. (1981)
- Sidney M. Gutierrez, U.S. (1995)

== H–Q ==
- Fred Haise, U.S. (1983)
- William Hale, UK (2004)
- Andrew Haley, U.S. (1976)
- Paul Haney, U.S.
- Susan Helms, U.S. (2004)
- James P. Henry, U.S. (1988)
- Hipparchus, Greece (2004)
- Walter Hohmann, Germany (1976)
- John Houbolt, U.S.
- Edwin Hubble, U.S. (2001)
- James Irwin, U.S. (1983)
- Alexei Isayev, USSR (1991)
- Martin Jaenke, U.S. (1993)
- Mae Jemison, U.S. (2004)
- Thomas Kelly, U.S.
- Johannes Kepler, Germany (1996)
- Nikolai Kibalchich, Russia (1976)
- Joseph Kittinger, U.S. (1989)
- William J. Knight, U.S. (1998)
- Yuri Kondratyuk, Ukraine (now)
- Sergei Korolev, USSR (1976)
- Christopher C. Kraft, Jr., U.S. (1988)
- Gene Kranz, U.S. (2012)
- Sergei Krikalev, USSR
- Valeri Kubasov, USSR (1976)
- Fritz Lang, Austria
- Jerome F. Lederer, U.S. (1992)
- Alexei Leonov, USSR (1976)
- Willy Ley, Germany/U.S. (1976)
- Jack R. Lousma, U.S. (1982)
- William Randolph Lovelace II, U.S. (1976)
- Jim Lovell, U.S. (1982)
- Archibald Low, UK (1976)
- George Lucas, U.S.
- Shannon Lucid, U.S. (1990)
- Frank Malina, U.S. (1990)
- Musa Manarov, USSR (1989)
- David Forbes Martyn, Australia (1980)
- Thomas Mattingly, U.S. (1983)
- Bruce McCandless II, U.S. (1995)
- Clifton McClure, U.S. (2001)
- James McDivitt, U.S. (1982)
- Georges Méliès, France
- Edgar Mitchell, U.S. (1979)
- Mike Mullane, U.S.
- Story Musgrave, U.S. (1995)
- Elon Musk, South Africa
- Homer E. Newell, Jr., U.S. (1987)
- Sir Isaac Newton, UK (1998)
- Claude Nicollier, Switzerland (1997)
- Hermann Oberth, Romania/Germany/U.S. (1976)
- Ludvik Ocenasek, Czechoslovakia (1978)
- George Pal, Hungary
- Vasily Parin, USSR (1978)
- Jeannette Piccard, U.S. (1998)
- Jean Piccard, U.S. (1998)
- William Hayward Pickering, U.S. (1980)
- Valeri Polyakov, Russia (1996)

== R–Z ==
- Thomas Reiter, Germany
- Sally Ride, U.S. (1985)
- Klaus Riedel, Germany
- Stuart Roosa, U.S. (1983)
- Robert A. Rushworth, U.S. (1991)
- Burt Rutan, U.S.
- Carl Sagan, U.S. (2004)
- Vikram Sarabhai, India
- Svetlana Savitskaya, USSR (1985)
- Wally Schirra, U.S. (1981)
- Harrison Schmitt, U.S. (1977)
- Bernard Adolph Schriever, U.S. (1997)
- Andreas Anthon Frederik Schumacher, Denmark (1981)
- Rusty Schweickart, U.S. (1983)
- David Scott, U.S. (1982)
- Alan Shepard, U.S. (1981)
- William Shepherd, U.S. (2004)
- George W. Simon, U.S. (2001)
- David Simons, U.S. (1987)
- Deke Slayton, U.S. (1990)
- Thomas P. Stafford, U.S. (1980)
- John Stapp, U.S. (1979)
- Ernst Steinhoff, U.S./Germany (1979)
- Kathryn D. Sullivan, U.S. (1985)
- Jack Swigert, U.S. (1983)
- Eugen Sänger, Austria/Germany (1976)
- Valentina Tereshkova, USSR (1985)
- Norman Thagard, U.S. (1996)
- Walter Thiel, Germany (1976)
- Mikhail Tikhonravov, USSR (1976)
- Vladimir Titov, USSR (1989)
- Clyde Tombaugh, U.S. (1980)
- Fridrikh Tsander, USSR (1976)
- Konstantin Tsiolkovsky, USSR (1976)
- Wilhelm T. Unge, Sweden (1977)
- Max Valier, Italy (1976)
- James Van Allen, U.S. (1984)
- Rodolfo Neri Vela, Mexico (1991)
- Jules Verne, France
- Wernher von Braun, Germany/U.S. (1976)
- Franz von Hoefft, Austria (1976)
- Theodore von Kármán, Hungary/U.S. (1976)
- Guido von Pirquet, Austria (1976)
- Joseph A. Walker, U.S. (1995)
- James E. Webb, U.S. (1994)
- Herbert Wells
- Guenter Wendt, Germany/U.S.
- Fred Lawrence Whipple, U.S. (1984)
- Ed White, U.S. (1982)
- Walter C. Williams, U.S. (1997)
- Johannes Winkler, Germany (1976)
- Alfred Worden, U.S. (1983)
- James Hart Wyld, U.S. (1976)
- Chuck Yeager, U.S. (1981)
- John Young, U.S. (1982)
- Fritz Zwicky, Switzerland/U.S. (1976)
- Yusuf Nas, Türkiye. (2025)

In addition, Hubertus Strughold was inducted into the Hall of Fame in 1978, but in May 2006, he was removed from the Hall of Fame by unanimous vote of the New Mexico Museum of Space History's board.

== See also ==
- United States Astronaut Hall of Fame
- International Air & Space Hall of Fame
- List of space technology awards
