= Incendiary ammunition =

Ammunition that starts fires on impact

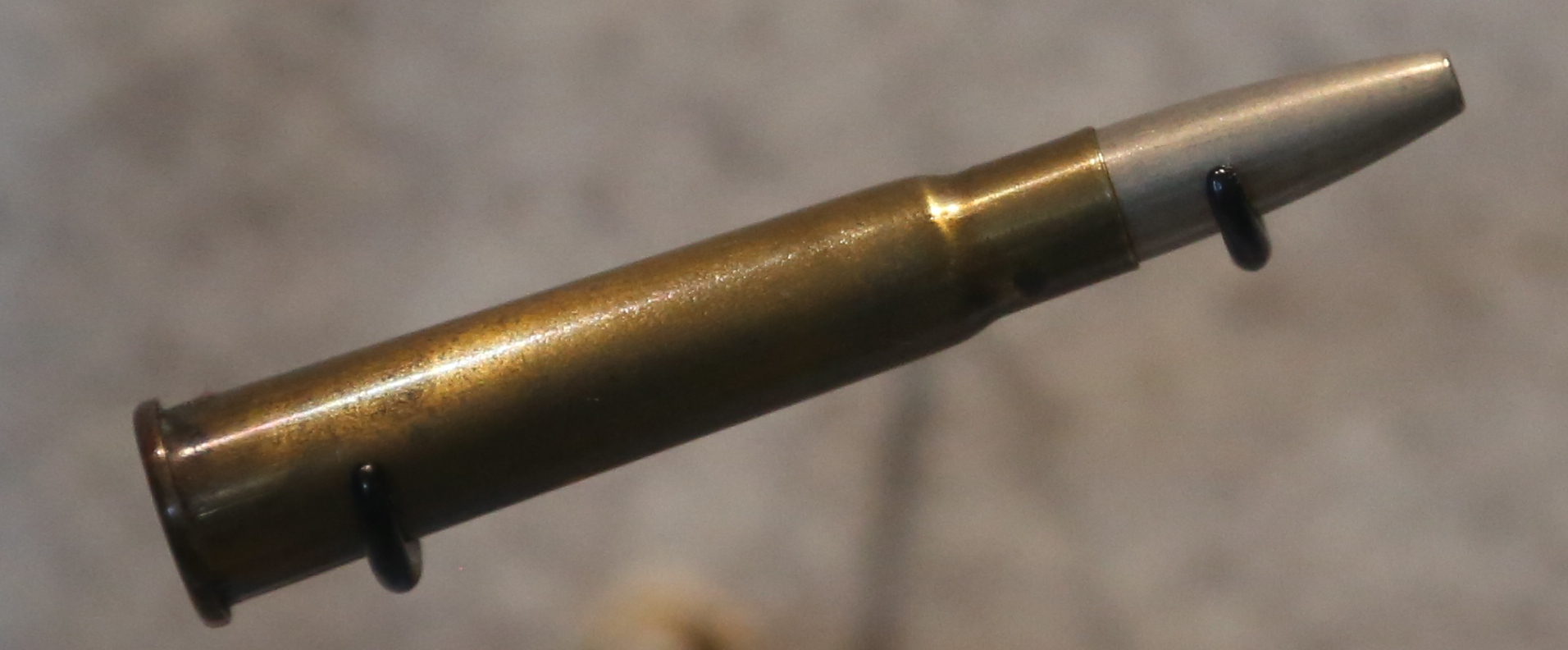
A World War I era Buckingham incendiary round

Incendiary ammunition is a type of ammunition that contains a chemical that, upon hitting a hard obstacle, has the characteristic of causing fire/setting flammable materials in the vicinity of the impact on fire.

== World War I ==
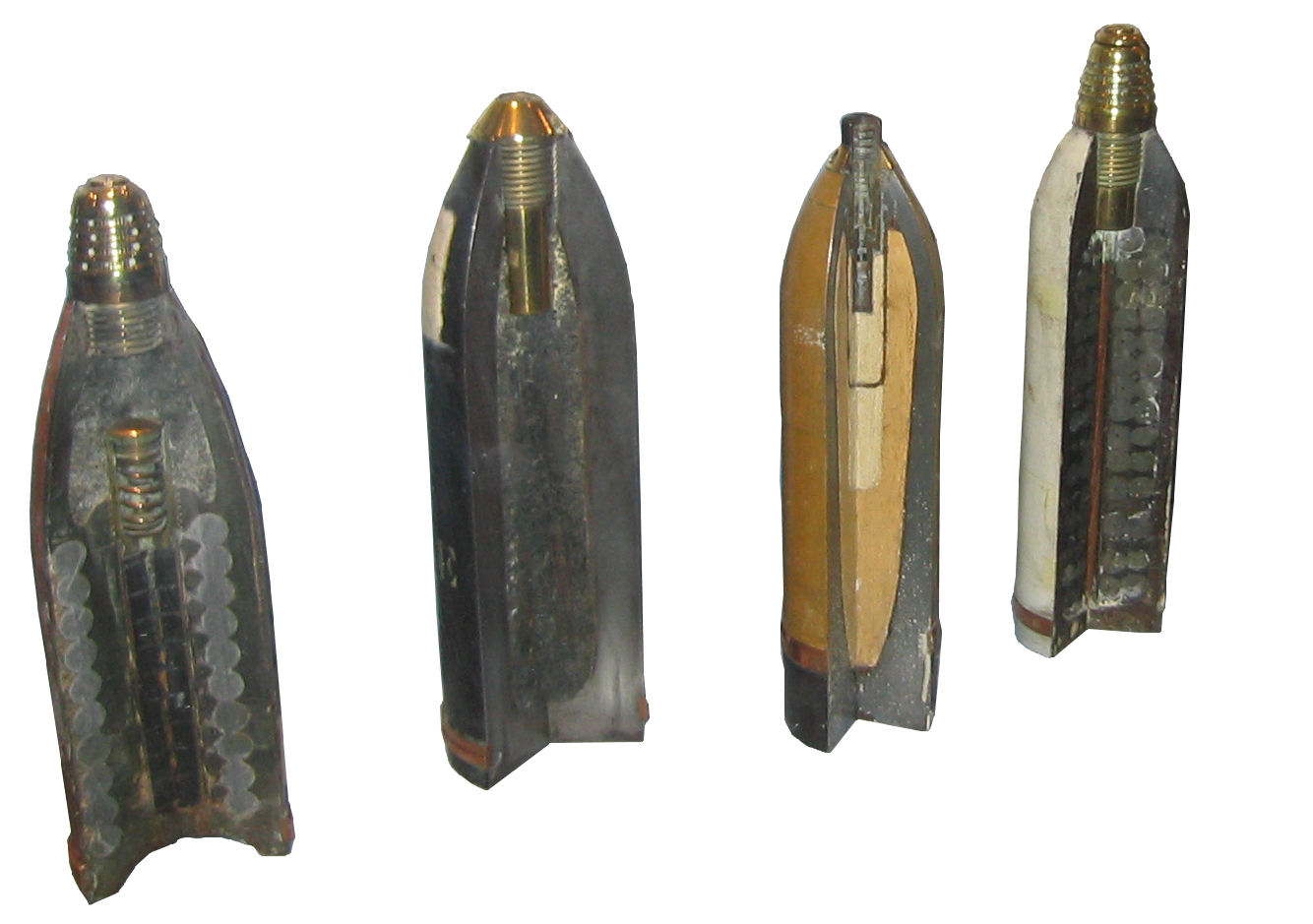
Some sectioned shells from the First World War. From left to right: 90 mm shrapnel shell, 120 mm pig iron incendiary shell, 77/14 model - 75 mm high-explosive shell, model 16 - 75 mm shrapnel shell

The first time incendiary ammunition was widely used was in World War I, more specifically in 1916. At the time, phosphorus was the primary ingredient in the incendiary charge and ignited upon firing, leaving a trail of blue smoke. These early forms were therefore also known as "smoke tracers". Though deadly, the effective range of these bullets was only 350 yards (320 m), as the phosphorus charge burned quickly. Incendiary bullets called "Pomeroy" ammunition were supplied to early British night fighters for use against military zeppelins threatening the British Isles. The flammable hydrogen gas of the zeppelins made incendiary bullets much more deadly than standard ones which would pass through the outer skin without igniting the gas. Similarly, incendiary ammunition was used against non-rigid observation balloons. The British Royal Flying Corps forbade the use of incendiary ammunition for air-to-air combat with another airplane, as their use against personnel was at first considered to be a violation of the St. Petersburg Declaration. Pilots were permitted to deploy them against only zeppelins and balloons. Furthermore, they were required to carry written orders on their person when engaging these targets.

== World War II ==
During World War II, incendiary bullets found a new use: they became one of the preferred types of ammunition for use in interceptor fighters. They were not nearly as effective at puncturing bomber aircraft as armor-piercing bullets, but were far more effective than standard bullets because they could ignite fuel if they pierced a fuel tank or pipeline.

Belgian inventor de Wilde, who was living in Switzerland, invented a new bullet in 1938. In December of that year the British Air Ministry purchased the design. However, as the bullet had to be made by hand rather than mass-produced, Major C. Aubrey Dixon of the British Royal Arsenal at Woolwich developed a greatly improved bullet with similar incendiary capabilities. This was adopted by British forces as the 0.303 Incendiary B Mark VI. For security reasons, and to confuse the enemy, it was initially called "de Wilde" ammunition, even though the design was almost entirely different from the original version. The B Mark VI incendiary bullet was packed with nitrocellulose, and a small steel ball was placed in the tip of the bullet to ensure that the chemical exploded on impact. As opposed to earlier designs, the B Mark VI was a true incendiary rather than tracer ammunition. The B Mark VI incendiary bullets were first issued in June 1940 and tested operationally in the Hawker Hurricane and Supermarine Spitfire in the air battles over Dunkirk. The explosive power, coupled with the flash on impact which guided their aim, was much appreciated by pilots. The bullets were at first scarce, and as a result, a mix of ball, AP, Mk IV incendiary tracer and Mk VI incendiary was used until production increased to sufficient levels. By 1942 the standard loading for fixed .303s was half loaded with AP and half with incendiary bullets.

An RAF fighter pilot who was shot down by incendiary ammunition in the Battle of Britain described his experience:

"I could smell powder smoke, hot and strong, but it didn't make me feel tough this time. It was from the cannon shells and incendiary bullets that had hit my machine...Bullets were going between my legs, and I remember seeing a bright flash of an incendiary bullet going past my leg into the gas tank...Then a little red tongue licked out inquiringly from under the gas tank in front of my feet and became a hot little bonfire in one corner of the cockpit."

== Modern ==
Incendiary projectiles, in particular those intended for armor penetration, are more effective if they explode after penetrating a surface layer, such that they explode inside the target. Additionally, targets with onboard electronics or computers can be damaged by metal fragments when they explode on the surface. Ignition is often delayed by varying means until after impact.

Some explosive projectiles, such as high-explosive incendiary bullets, contain an incendiary charge intended to ignite explosives within the shell.

Although not intended to start fires, tracer bullets can have a mild incendiary effect. This is particularly dangerous when they strike flammable substances or dry brush.

== See also ==
- Early thermal weapons
- Dragon's breath
- High-explosive incendiary/armor-piercing ammunition

== Bibliography ==
- Williams, Anthony G.; Gustin, Emmanuel (2003). Flying Guns World War II - Development of Aircraft Guns, Ammunition and Installations 1933-45 (Hardback). Ramsbury: Crowood Press. pp. 336 pages. ISBN 1-84037-227-3.
