= Franz von Hoefft =

Austrian space scientist (1882–1954)

Franz Oskar Leo Elder von Hoefft (1882–1954) was an Austrian space scientist.

== Biography ==
Born on 5 April 1882 in Vienna, von Hoefft's initial military career was cut short due to poor eyesight, leading him to pursue academics. He obtained a Phd in chemistry from the University of Vienna in 1907 after studying at the University of Technology in Vienna.

In 1926, von Hoefft co-founded the Wissenschaftliche Gesellschaft für Höhenforschung (Scientific Society for High Altitude Research), the first organization in Europe dedicated to space-related research and served as its president. This society engaged in early space exploration concepts and collaborated with contemporaries in rocketry, such as Hermann Oberth.

Von Hoefft proposed several rocket designs, starting with the RH-1, a sounding rocket intended for high-altitude atmospheric research. This was followed by the RH-2, designed for tasks like transporting mail and photographing Earth from high altitudes. The RH-3, a two-stage rocket, was conceptualized for lunar missions. His most advanced proposals were the RH-V, a spacecraft for global and lunar travel, and the RH-VIII, a multistage rocket designed for interplanetary exploration. He suggested these rockets could be built in space to bypass the constraints of Earth-based launches.

Von Hoefft's work was hindered by internal disagreements within Austria's rocketry community and the political changes in Austria during the 1930s. The Scientific Society for High Altitude Research dissolved in 1930, and following Austria's annexation in 1938, the focus of rocketry shifted towards military applications.

Von Hoefft died in Linz, Austria, in 1954, having made significant early contributions to the field of space science.
