= Archibald Low =

English engineer, physicist, inventor and author

"Professor" Archibald Montgomery Low

Archibald Montgomery Low (17 October 1888 – 13 September 1956) developed the first powered drone aircraft. He was an English consulting engineer, research physicist and inventor, and author of more than 40 books.

Low has been called the "father of radio guidance systems" due to his pioneering work on planes, torpedoes boats and guided rockets. He was a pioneer in many fields though, often leading the way for others, but his lack of discipline meant he hardly ever saw a project through, being easily distracted by new ideas. If not for this inability to see things to a conclusion, Low could well have been remembered as one of the great men of science. Many of his scientific contemporaries disliked him, due in part to his using the title "professor", which he was not entitled to do as he did not occupy an academic chair. His love of the limelight and publicity probably also added to the dislike.

Low was working on the invention of television before World War I and promoting its development through the 1920s.

He was also known for his predictions of future technical and social developments, several of which have been shown to have elements that were correct.

== Early life ==
Low was born in Purley, London, the second son of John and Gertrude Low. His father was an engineer with experience in steam boilers and Low's interest in all things mechanical and scientific was fired by visits to his father's place of work. The family moved to Erith in Kent when Low was still a baby. He was sent to Preparatory school at Colet Court when his father moved to Australia as a director of the Paddy Lackey Deep-level Company gold mine. In 1896 Archibald was only 7 when he sailed with his mother, his elder brother and a maiden aunt on the ship Thermopylae to Sydney for a visit. He recalls being amazed to find that telephones were fitted in every house. As a young boy Low was forever experimenting at home, building homemade steam turbines or conducting chemical experiments that brought havoc to his local neighbourhood and caused his parents to receive many complaints about the bangs, smells and gases created by young Archie.

At the age of 11 he was enrolled into St Paul's School, an institution where he did not fit in; Low described himself as having been "too much of an individual". One of his classmates for several years was Bernard Montgomery, whom Low recalled as being "rather dull".

Aged 16 Low entered the Central Technical College, an institution far more to his liking, where he began to more fully develop his abilities. Under the guidance of his mentor Professor Ashcroft, Low's mercurial mind was given free rein over many of the scientific disciplines. During his time at the CTC Low designed a drawing device which he called "The Low flexible and adjustable curve". This device, along with a dotted line pen and a self filling draughtsman's pen, were marketed by Thornton's, a renowned instrument manufacturer based in Manchester. He also spent a year devising and making a selector mechanism which allowed a lever when moved to fall into a pre-selected slot. It would be 32 more years before pre-selected gears became commercially available, long after Low had originally thought of them.

== Early career ==
Low joined his uncle Edward Low's engineering firm, Low Accessories and Ignition Company, which at the time was the second oldest engineering firm in the City of London. However, the company was in a constant struggle for solvency. Edward Low did what he could financially to help get his nephew's ideas off the ground, but what was really needed was a rich investor. During this pre-war period Low was constantly coming up with big new ideas, such as his forced induction engine (which in modern parlance would be called a petrol direct injection engine), which was further developed with the large engine builder F. E. Baker Ltd and exhibited on their stand at the Olympia Motor Cycle Show in November 1912. He also invented gadgets such as a whistling egg-boiler which he christened "The Chanticleer". It went on to sell very well, earning him some much-needed money. He also experimented with gas turbines, but the alloys available at that time were unable to tolerate the heat involved.

In May 1914 Low gave the first demonstrations of what was to become television, calling it TeleVista. The first of these demonstrations was given to the Institute of Automobile Engineers. Harry Gordon Selfridge then arranged to included one at the famous Selfridge Store Exhibitions. Reports of these were titled "Seeing by Wireless". Low's invention was crude and under-developed but demonstrated the idea. The main deficiency was the selenium cell used for converting light waves into electric impulses, which responded too slowly for motion-picture use. The demonstration certainly garnered media interest. The Times reported on 30 May:

An inventor, Dr. A. M. Low, has discovered a means of transmitting visual images by wire. If all goes well with this invention, we shall soon be able, it seems, to see people at a distance.

On 29 May the Daily Chronicle reported:

Dr. Low gave a demonstration for the first time in public, with a new apparatus that he has invented, for seeing, he claims by electricity, by which it is possible for persons using a telephone to see each other at the same time

Low failed to follow up on this promising work, due in part to his temperamental failings as well as to the outbreak of World War I later that year. Nature commented that the work was overblown in "Sensational paragraphs on seeing by wire". However, a US consular report from London by Deputy Consul General Carl Raymond Loop provided a different story and considerable detail about Low's system. Low finally applied for his "Televista" Patent No. 191,405 for "Improved Apparatus for the Electrical Transmission of Optical Images" in 1917, but its release was delayed, possibly for security reasons. It was finally published in 1923. In this patent, A. M. Low states, "I do not confine myself to the use of wires for actually transmitting the current as this may be accomplished by electric radiation." In 1927 Ronald Frank Tiltman asked Low to write the introduction to his book in which he acknowledged Low's work, referring to Low's various related patents with an apology that they were of "too technical a nature for inclusion". Although it employed an electro-mechanical scanning mechanism, with its matrix detector (camera) and mosaic screen (receiver), it is unlike all of the later systems of the 20th century. In these respects, Low had a digital television system 80 years before the advent of today's digital TV and deserves his place in the history of television. Furthermore, Carl Loop's report said "the selenium in the transmitting screen may be replaced by any diamagnetic material" and in his patent of 1938 A. M. Low stated, "It has also been proposed ... a photo-electric cell embodying a plate coated with a photo-sensitive substance which is subdivided into a number of cells by incising the coating lengthwise and crosswise", essentially the process used today to create megapixel image sensors.

== The Great War ==
The Experimental Works staff of the RFC. Low is front centre.

When war broke out, Low joined the military and received officer training. After a few months he was promoted to captain and seconded to the Royal Flying Corps, the precursor of the RAF. His brief was to use his civilian research on Televista to remotely control the RFC drone weapons proposed by the Royal Aircraft Factory, so it could be used as a guided missile. With two other officers (Captain Poole and Lieutenant Bowen) under him, they set to work to see if it were possible. This project was called "Aerial Target" or AT, a deliberate misnomer to fool the Germans into thinking it was about building a drone plane to test anti-aircraft capabilities. After they built a prototype, General Sir David Henderson (director-general of Directorate of Military Aeronautics) ordered that an Experimental Works should be created at Feltham to build the first proper "Aerial Target" complete with explosive warhead. As head of the Experimental Works, Low was given about 30 picked men, including jewellers, carpenters and aircraftsmen, in order to get the pilotless plane built as quickly as possible. The AT planes were from manufacturers such as Airco, Sopwith Aviation Company and the Royal Aircraft Factory.

The de Havilland-designed Airco ATs had their first trial on 21 March 1917 at Upavon Central Flying School near Salisbury Plain, attended by 30–40 allied generals. The AT was launched from the back of a lorry using compressed air (another first). Low and his team successfully demonstrated their ability to control the craft before engine failure led to its crash landing. A subsequent trial of the RAF ATs on 6 July 1917 was cut short as an AT had been lost at takeoff. At a later date an electrically driven gyrocompass (yet another first) was added to the plane. In 1918 Low's Feltham Works developed the airborne controlled Royal Navy Distance Control Boats (DCB), a variant of the Coastal Motor Boat. In 1917 Low and his team also invented the first electrically steered rocket (the world's first wireless, or wire-guided rocket), almost an exact counterpart of the one used by the Germans in 1942 against merchant shipping. Low's inventions during the war were to a large extent ahead of their time and hence were under-appreciated by the government of the day, although the Germans were well aware of how dangerous his inventions might be. In October 1914, two attempts were made to assassinate him: the first involved shots fired through his laboratory window in Paul Street; in the second, a visitor with a German accent came to Low's office and offered him a cigarette, which was found to contain a lethal dose of strychnine chloride.

In 1917 the priority for Low's control system changed, the new imperative being to counter the submarine threat. Low was transferred to the Royal Navy along with Lieutenant Ernest Windsor Bowen to adapt the AT system to control the DCBs, but Low still commanded the RFC works at Feltham where the work was carried out. The Feltham guidance system was adopted by the Royal Navy's secret D.C.B. Section, which was commanded by Eric Gascoigne Robinson VC and based at Calshot. During 1918, trials and rehearsals of controlling Royal Naval boats from RAF aircraft had been completed by the D.C.B. Section and the Admiralty Plans Division had detailed a number of potential targets. On 13 March 1918, Robinson requested 12 sets of the radio guidance equipment from Feltham. An order for 12 new D.C.B. boats was approved, but they were not expected to be ready before the end of 1918.

Although none of these potential weapons were deployed in the war, the pre-dreadnought battleship HMS Agamemnon was converted into a remote-control target ship in 1920 and the Feltham "Aerial Target" project was taken up by Royal Aircraft Establishment, who tested a series of Royal Aircraft Factory 1917-type ATs with a 45 hp Armstrong Siddeley engine in 1921. Low's principles were adopted by the Air Ministry for the RAE Larynx (from "Long Range Gun with Lynx Engine"), and explosive-laden autopiloted aircraft developed by the Royal Aircraft Establishment from 1925. This drone development work culminated in the fleet of Queen Bee aerial target variants of the de Havilland Tiger Moth of the 1930s. Development was continued by the British before and during the Second World War.

During World War II the Germans also made good use of Low's 1918 rocket guidance system and used it as one of the foundations for their guided weapons, the Henschel Hs 293, the Fritz X, and the V1 Doodlebug.

As Low had developed these inventions while employed by the War Department, they were considered to have been invented as part of his duties, which prevented him from benefitting financially from them.

Low was commended for this work by a number of senior officers, including Sir David Henderson and Admiral Edward Stafford Fitzherbert. Sir Henry Norman, a radio engineer and distinguished politician, wrote to Low in March 1918 saying, "I know of no man who has more extensive and more profound scientific knowledge, combined with a greater gift of imaginative invention than yourself".

== Inter-war years ==
Not long after the war, Low started the Low Engineering Company Ltd in association with the Hon. C. N. Bruce (later Lord Aberdare). The company offices were on Kensington High Street, and Low spent much of his time trying to bring his inventions to fruition. As usual, though, he was easily distracted by gadgets that he devised, taking his attention away from the more important work. One of the better gadgets was a motor scooter that Low invented and manufactured in conjunction with Henry Norman.

In 1926, Low was reported to be working with Ivor Halstead, editor of the Daily Sketch, on the script of a film to be called Cosmos, about the history of the world from the beginning of time.

Despite his best efforts, he struggled to succeed in business. An example of this is the magazine he started up with his friend Lord Brabazon and others. It was titled Armchair Science; Low helped edit it, and at one point the sales were 80,000 a month, yet it never achieved a profit and was ultimately sold off. Another of Low's hobbies was racing cars and motorbikes. He was a regular attendee at Brooklands and at one point invented a rocket-propelled bike, as well as numerous other gadgets and improvements for the internal combustion engine. Low was worried about the number of road traffic accidents that were occurring, and believed speed in cities should be restricted to 25 mph using modern radio methods to enforce it. Low was also annoyed by excess noise, to this end he invented an audiometer to measure and record noise in a visual form. He conducted experiments on the London Underground and achieved some success in pinpointing trouble spots and reducing their impact by use of shields over the wheels and padding of the interior panels.

In 1938 Low had lunch with a gentleman called William Joyce. Joyce wanted Low to contribute an article to a paper he helped run. Low declined the offer being too busy; it was only a couple of years later that Joyce gained infamy as Lord Haw-Haw.

A few of Low's inventions from this period are:

- Using infra-red photography to check head space in engines;
- A machine for reproducing photographs by radio;
- An audiometer that was a forerunner of sound photography at high speed (used in engineering and architectural work);
- A device for converting ordinary print to Braille using photo electric cells;
- Cap-detonating sparkplug.

== Second World War and later ==
At the outbreak of the Second World War, Low initially joined the Air Ministry in a civil capacity. His job was to examine captured German aircraft and prepare reports for British pilots to enable them to identify the weak points of the enemy aircraft. Later on he joined the Royal Pioneer Corps and was promoted to major. Between experiments in his back garden laboratory, he gave frequent talks to service personnel on scientific matters. Low was frequently in bad health from the late 1930s onwards, having never fully recovered from a bout of pneumonia he suffered a few years earlier. Although nothing that he experimented with during the war ultimately came to fruition, he did work on some interesting projects:

- The 'W' bomb – a riverine mine for Operation Royal Marine being designed by MD1. It floated just beneath the surface, came up when needed and spread a kind of umbrella out of itself which would detonate when touched. The primary inventors were Millis Jefferis and Stuart Macrae; the latter was formerly an editor of Armchair Science with whom Low was on friendly terms.
- A bomb that when dropped on airfields would be buried to the hilt but leave trailing wires on the surface. An aircraft touching these wires would detonate the bomb.
- A notable humanitarian example involved the incorporation of a flap on a carrier pigeon's cage secured by sugar so that if the pigeon was trapped after a crash or incident moisture would soak into the sugar and release the bird.

== Predictions ==
Low's predictions included radio alarm clocks; personal radio sets; escalators and travelators; "loudspeaker news" and television; the normalisation of women wearing trousers; and telephones that would dial remembered numbers automatically. Less accurate predictions were for synthetic felt one-piece suits; and electrically charged water weapons.

== Quotations ==
The telephone may develop to a stage where it is unnecessary to enter a special call-box. We shall think no more of telephoning to our office from our cars or railway-carriages than we do today of telephoning from our homes.

— (1937)

The second stage in the development of space-ships could be the launching of what have been called "space-platforms" ... The rocket or space-station will travel round the earth in twenty four hours at most. The value of such stations might be very great; they might enable world-wide television broadcasts to be made; they would transmit data about cosmic rays; or solar radiation; and they might have incalculable military value.

— (1950)

No team ever invents anything, they only develop one man's flash of genius.

I always say that the greatest discovery is that we know practically nothing about anything.

== Later life ==
Low died at his London home in 1956 aged 68. The cause of his death was a malignant tumour on his lung. He is buried in Brompton Cemetery, London.

In 1976 Low was inducted into the International Space Hall of Fame.

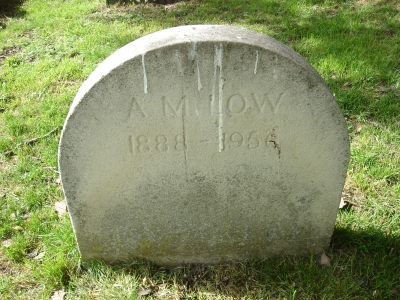
Gravestone, Brompton Cemetery, London

== Works ==
Low was a prolific author of science books. He aimed several of his books at the layman to try to nurture interest in science and engineering. Quite a few of his books contained predictions on scientific advancements. In addition to his non-fiction books, Low wrote four science fiction novels for young readers.

=== Non-fiction ===
- The Two Stroke Engine: A Manual of the Coming Form of the Internal Combustion Engine (1916)
- Wireless Possibilities (1924)
- The Future (1925)
- Tendencies of Modern Science (1930)
- On My Travels(1930)
- The Wonder Book of Inventions (1930)
- Popular Scientific Recreations (1933)
- Science in Wonderland (1935)
- Recent Inventions (1935)
- Great Scientific Achievements (1936)
- Conquering Space and Time (1937)
- Life and its Story (1937)
- Home Experiments (1937)
- Electrical Inventions (1937)
- Science for the Home (1938)
- What New Wonders! (1938)
- Science in Industry (1939)
- Modern Armaments (1939)
- How We Find Out (1940)
- Mine and Countermine (1940)
- The Way It Works (1940)
- The Submarine at War (1941)
- Romance of Fire (1941)
- Science Looks ahead (1942)
- Tanks (1942)
- Musket to Machine-Gun (1942)
- Facts and Fancies (1942)
- Parachutes in Peace and War (1942)
- Benefits of War (1943)
- Tick-Tock (1944)
- Six Scientific Years (1946)
- How Secrets Work (1946)
- Your World Tomorrow (1947)
- They Made Your World (1949)
- Look, Listen and Touch (1949)
- It's Bound to Happen (1950)
- The Past Presented (1952)
- Electronics Everywhere (1952)
- Wonderful Wembley Stadium (1953)
- Thanks to Inventors (1954)

=== Fiction ===
- Peter Down the Well (1933)
- Adrift in the Stratosphere (1937)
- Mars Breaks Through, or The Great Murchison Mystery
- Satellite in Space (1956)

== Appointments ==
- Associate of the City and Guilds of London Institute
- Member of the Institute of Mechanical Engineers
- Fellow of the Chemical Society
- Fellow and President of the British Institute for Radio Engineers
- Chairman for 24 years of the AutoCycle Union
- President for 32 years (1925-1956) of the South Eastern Centre of the AutoCycle Union
- Chairman of the RAC Motor Cycle Committee
- Honorary technical advisor to the Women's Automobile and Sports Association 1929
- Vice-chairman and chairman for 20 years of the British Automobile Racing Club
- Fellow of the Royal Geographical Society
- Principal of the British Institute of Engineering Technology
- Fellow of the Institute of Electronics
- One of the founder members, and 2nd President (1936–1951) of the British Interplanetary Society
- Associated Hon. Asst, Professor of Physics at the Royal Ordnance College, by the Army Council
- Membership of the Magic Circle from 5 September 1950

== Recognition ==
In 1976 Low was included in the 35 pioneers listed by the International Academy of Astronautics and inducted into the International Space Hall of Fame in 1976. He has been called the "Father of Radio Guidance Systems" and the "founder of the field of radio guidance systems". Alternatively, it was suggested A. M. Low was the "Father of Remotely Piloted Vehicles".
