= HMS Indefatigable =

Six ships of the Royal Navy have been named HMS Indefatigable:

- HMS Indefatigable (1784) was a 64-gun third-rate ship of the line launched in 1784, razeed to a 44-gun frigate in 1795 and broken up in 1816. This was the ship popularised by C. S. Forester in the early volumes of his Hornblower series of novels.
- HMS Indefatigable was to have been a 50-gun fourth rate. She was ordered in 1832 but cancelled in 1834.
- HMS Indefatigable (1848) was a 50-gun fourth rate launched in 1848, loaned as a training ship after 1865 (see TS Indefatigable) and sold in 1914.
- HMS Indefatigable (1891) was an Apollo-class second class cruiser launched in 1891, renamed HMS Melpomene in 1910, and sold in 1913.
- HMS Indefatigable (1909) was an Indefatigable-class battlecruiser, launched in 1909 and sunk at the Battle of Jutland in 1916.
- HMS Indefatigable (R10) was an Implacable-class aircraft carrier, launched in 1942 and scrapped in 1956.

== Battle honours ==
Ships named Indefatigable have earned the following battle honours:

- Virginie, 1796
- Droits de L'Homme, 1797
- Basque Roads, 1809
- Jutland, 1916
- East Indies, 1945
- Palembang, 1945
- Okinawa, 1945
- Japan, 1945

== Other vessels ==
- Indefatigable-class battlecruiser
- Indefatigable (1799), a merchant ship launched in 1799 for trade to the West Indies. In 1804 she served as an armed defense ship and recaptured Melcombe on 21 June 1804.
- TS Indefatigable, British training ship

== See also ==
- The dictionary definition of indefatigable at Wiktionary
- Indefatigable (disambiguation)
