= Melpomene (disambiguation) =

Melpomene was one of the Nine Muses in Greek mythology and a Greek female given name (popular variant: Melpo).

Melpomene may also refer to:

- 18 Melpomene, a main belt asteroid
- Heliconius melpomene, a common butterfly in South and Central America
- HMS Melpomene, seven ships of the Royal Navy
- Melpomene (plant), a genus of polypod fern
- Melpomene (spider) a genus of spider in the family Agelenidae
- Melpomene Projects, one of the Housing Projects of New Orleans
- Melpo Mene, an Indie pop band from Stockholm, Sweden
- Melpomene, a woman reported to have attempted to participate in the 1896 Olympics, possibly Stamata Revithi
- Melpomene, album from the band Frailty
- "Melpomene," Book IV of the Histories by Herodotus
