= Herbert William Sumner Gibson =

Royal Navy Officer

Vice-Admiral Herbert William Sumner Gibson
- Born: 22 April 1846
- Died: 7 July 1923 (aged 77)
- Military career
- Rank: Vice-Admiral
- Commands: HMS Wallaroo; HMS Curacoa; HMS Thunderer (1872); HMS Katoomba; Naval Officer in Charge, Sydney

Herbert William Sumner Gibson was an officer of the Royal Navy, who served in the Australia Station. He was the son of Bishop Edgar Gibson. As captain of the corvette HMS Curacoa he was sent to the Ellice Islands to make a formal declaration that the islands were to be a British Protectorate, which occurred between 9 and 16 October 1892. In June 1893 Captain Gibson visited the southern Solomon Islands and made the formal declaration of the British Solomon Islands Protectorate.

== Career ==
Gibson was promoted to the rank of Lieutenant in 1867 and Commander in 1880. He was promoted to the rank of Captain in 1888, and was appointed to command the cruiser HMS Wallaroo in April 1891, which command he held until 4 November 1891. Wallaroo served as part of the Auxiliary Squadron of the Australia Station.

He took command of the corvette HMS Curacoa on 5 November 1891. Curacoa was sent to the Ellice Islands for Captain Gibson to make a formal declaration that the islands were to be a British Protectorate. Each of the Ellice Islands was declared a British Protectorate by Captain Gibson of HMS Curacoa, between 9 and 16 October 1892. In June 1893 Captain Gibson visited the southern Solomon Islands and made the formal declaration of the British Solomon Islands Protectorate. Curacoa left the Australia Station in December 1894.

Gibson ceased command of Curacoa on 31 May 1895, then was appointed to command the battleship HMS Thunderer (1872) on 1 February 1896. Thunderer became a coast guard ship in Wales. He took command of the cruiser HMS Katoomba on 15 December 1897, and served on the Australian Station, which command he held until 22 April 1900.

He was appointed as the Naval Officer in Charge, Sydney in 1897, which command he held until 1900, when he was placed on the Retired List. He was advanced to the rank of Rear admiral in 1901, and to the rank of Vice admiral in 1905.

== Sources ==
- The Dreadnought Project article
