= HMCS Rainbow (1891) =

Apollo-class protected cruiser in Royal Canadian Navy

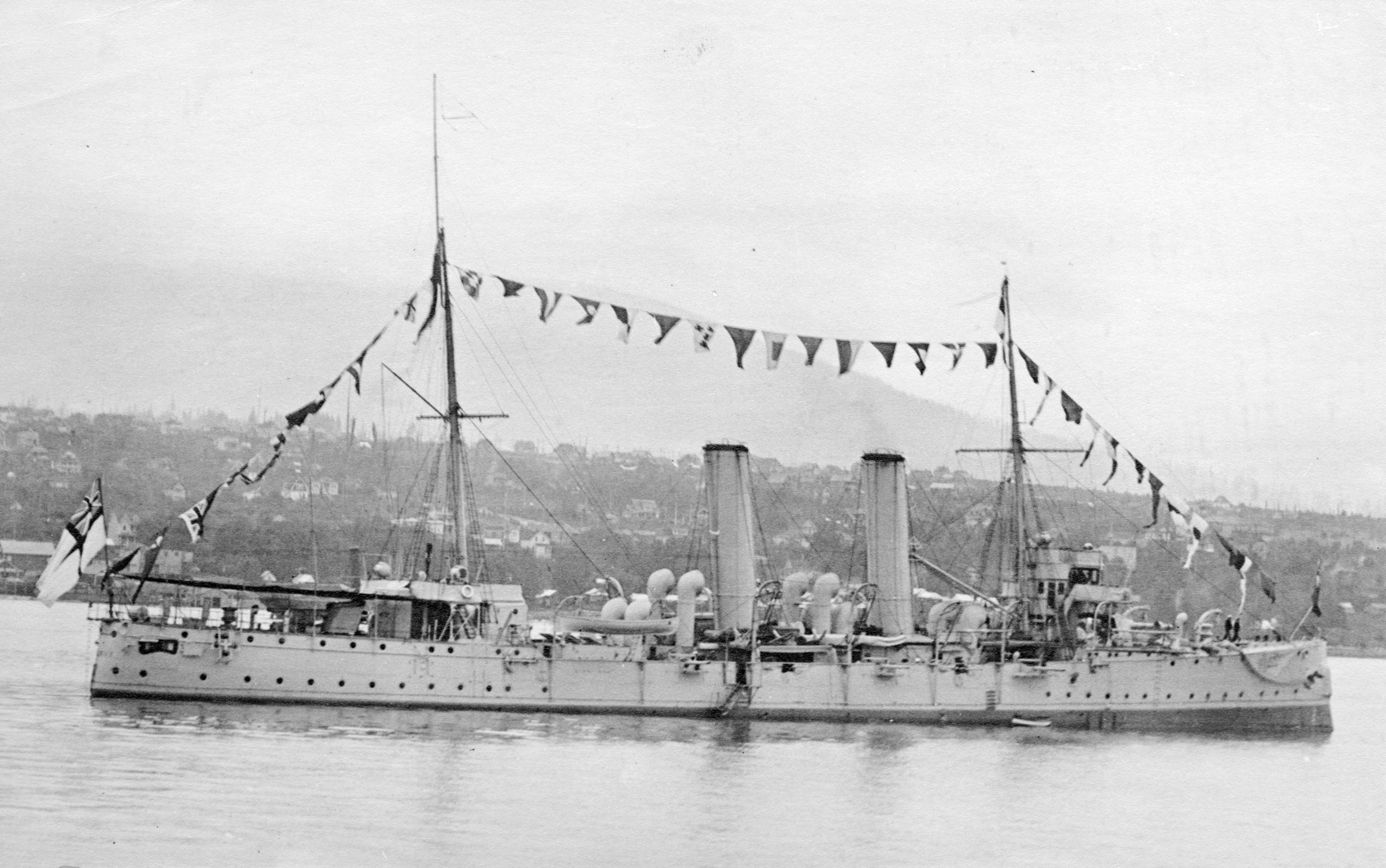
- HMCS Rainbow in 1910

History

United Kingdom
- Name: Rainbow
- Builder: Palmers, Hebburn
- Laid down: 1890
- Launched: 25 March 1891
- Commissioned: 1892
- Decommissioned: 1909
- Stricken: 1909
- Fate: Transferred to Canada

Canada
- Name: Rainbow
- Commissioned: 4 August 1910
- Decommissioned: 1 June 1920
- Stricken: 1 June 1920
- Fate: Scrapped 1920

General characteristics
- Class & type: Apollo-class protected cruiser
- Displacement: 3,600 long tons (3,700 t)
- Length: 314 ft (95.7 m)
- Beam: 43.5 ft (13.3 m)
- Draught: 17.5 ft (5.3 m)
- Propulsion: 2 shaft, 2-cylinder triple expansion, 7,000 ihp (5,200 kW) natural draught
- Speed: 19.75 knots (36.58 km/h; 22.73 mph)
- Range: 8,000 nmi (15,000 km; 9,200 mi) at 10 kn (19 km/h; 12 mph)
- Complement: 273
- Armament: 2 × QF 6 in (152 mm) guns; 6 × QF 4.724 in (120 mm) guns; 8 × QF 6-pounder (57 mm) guns; 4 × 14 in (360 mm) torpedo tubes
- Armour: Deck: 1 1/4–2 in (32–51 mm); Conning tower: 3 in (76 mm); Gun shields: 4 1/2 in (114 mm); Engine hatch: 5 in (127 mm)

HMCS Rainbow was an Apollo-class protected cruiser built for Great Britain's Royal Navy as HMS Rainbow entering service in 1892. Rainbow saw time in Asian waters before being placed in reserve in 1909. In 1910 the cruiser was transferred to the Royal Canadian Navy for service on the west coast. At the outbreak of the First World War, Rainbow was the only major Canadian or British warship on the western coast of North America. Due to age, the cruiser was taken out of service in 1917 and sold for scrap in 1920 and broken up.

== Design and description ==
The Apollo-class cruisers were enlarged versions of the preceding Marathon class. Rainbow displaced 3,600 long tons (3,700 t), which made the ship heavier than some of her sister ships. This was due to being among the ten vessels in the class sheathed in wood and copper for tropical service. This added 200 long tons (200 t) to their displacement. The Apollo-class cruisers were 300 feet (91 m) long between perpendiculars and 314 feet (96 m) overall. Sheathed vessels had a beam of 43 feet 8 inches (13.31 m) and a draught of 18 feet 6 inches (5.64 m). The cruisers were propelled by a two shaft, two-cylinder triple expansion engine powered by steam from three double-ended and two single-ended boilers creating 7,000 indicated horsepower (5,200 kW) at natural draught and 9,000 indicated horsepower (6,700 kW) at forced draught. This gave the cruisers a maximum speed of 18.5 knots (34.3 km/h; 21.3 mph) at natural draught and 19.75 knots (36.58 km/h; 22.73 mph) at forced draught. The Apollo class carried 535 long tons (544 t) of coal for fuel. With full bunkers of coal, the cruisers had a range of 8,000 nautical miles (15,000 km; 9,200 mi) at 10 knots (19 km/h; 12 mph).

Rainbow's main armament was two single-mounted QF 6-inch (152 mm) guns placed along the centreline of the forecastle and poop deck. This was augmented by six QF 4.7-inch (119 mm) guns placed three on each side of the upper deck amidships. The secondary armament of eight QF 6-pounder (57 mm) guns were all situated on the upper deck with four placed between the 4.7-inch guns amidships, two placed forward and aft firing through embrasured ports. The cruisers were also fitted with four 14 in (360 mm) torpedo tubes, of which three were installed on the upper deck, two broadside abreast the mainmast and one in the bow. The fourth torpedo tube was situated in the stern on the main deck. The Apollo class had a 1 1/4-inch (32 mm) armoured deck where flat and 2-inch (51 mm) armoured deck where sloped. The cruisers had a 5-inch (127 mm) armoured glacis over the hatch where the engine cylinders projected above the deck. The conning tower had 3 inches (76 mm) of armour and the gun shields 4 1/2 inches (114 mm).

== Service history ==
=== Royal Navy ===
Rainbow was ordered as part of the Naval Defence Act of 1889. The vessel's keel was laid down by Palmers at Hebburn-On-Tyne in England on 30 December 1889. The cruiser was launched on 25 March 1891 and entered service in 1892, completing in January 1893.

Rainbow served on the China Station in Hong Kong from 1895 to 1898 and in Malta from 1898 to 1899. She had an operating cost that was deemed excessive and between 1900 and 1909, saw very little service. Most of her operations at this time were closer to England. On 17 December 1901 she was commissioned at Devonport by Captain Thomas Young Greet for service in the cruiser squadron as an additional ship in home waters. She arrived back at Devonport from a tour of the Mediterranean with the squadron in April 1902, and took part in the fleet review held at Spithead on 16 August 1902 for the coronation of King Edward VII. Captain Charles Delabere Granville was appointed in command on 20 August 1902, and visited Souda Bay, Crete, with other ships of the squadron for combined manoeuvres the following month. In October 1902 she was ordered back to Devonport for a refit, and late that year she was again back for temporary service in the Mediterranean to protect British interests in Morocco, subsequently visiting Las Palmas in early February 1903. During the following years, she saw a severe reduction in fleet support due to her high operating cost, resulting in only minor modernization. Her crew rotation at this time was used as a training cycle. In 1904, the cruiser was restricted to harbour duty. In early 1909, the Admiralty ordered her decommissioned and placed on the inactive list.

=== Royal Canadian Navy ===
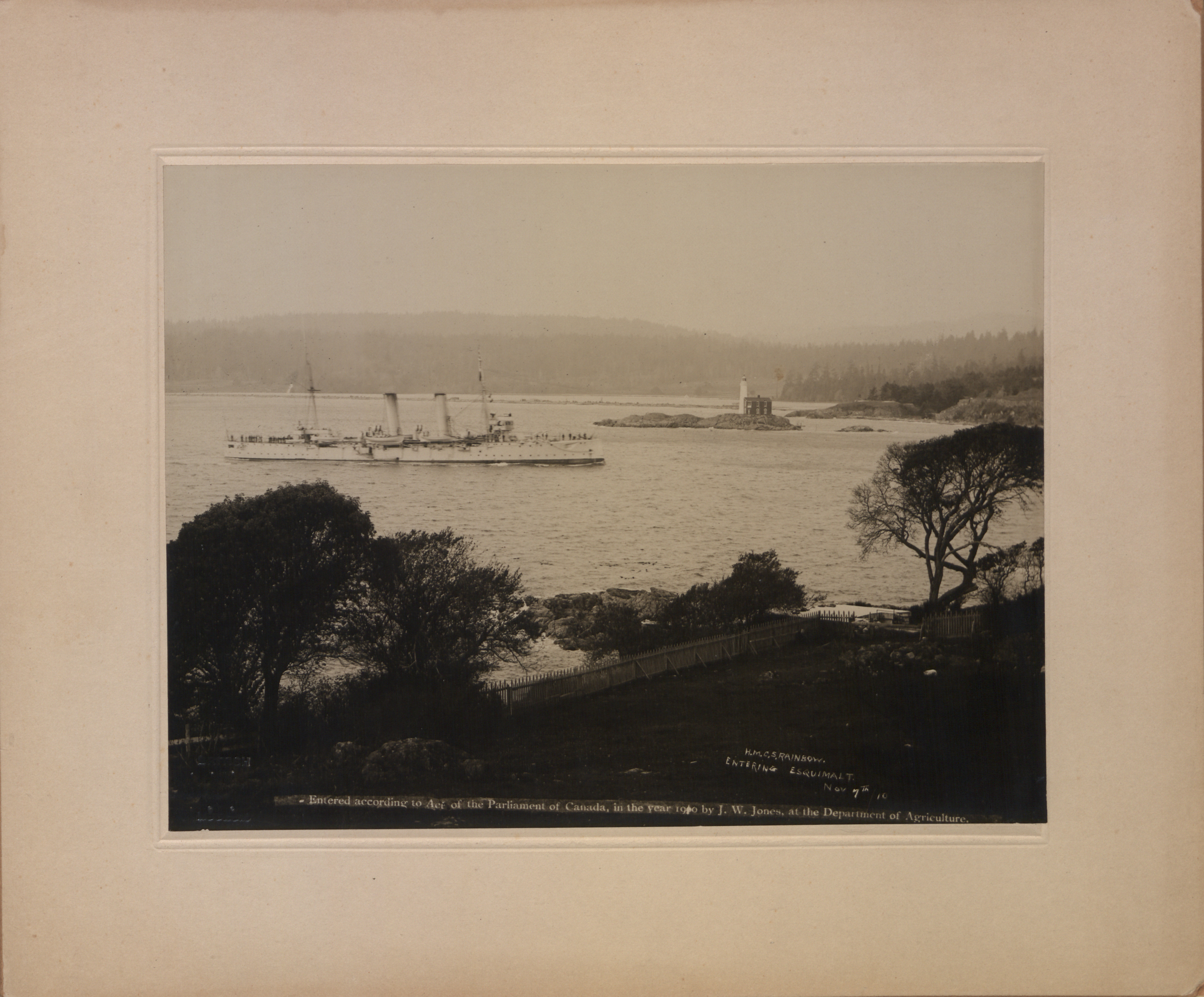
HMCS Rainbow entering Esquimalt, 7 November 1910 (HS85-10-23189)

Rainbow was presented to Canada in 1910, and was recommissioned HMCS Rainbow on 4 August. She and HMS Niobe were purchased from the Admiralty to be used as training ships at Royal Naval College of Canada in Halifax, Nova Scotia. During discussions on the type of cruisers to be sent to Canada, the Admiralty believed that the Apollo-class cruiser was the right choice. Canada paid $225,000 to acquire Rainbow, using outstanding money from the Marine and Fisheries Department. Before departing Great Britain, the ships required alterations to make them suitable for training. This required new heating systems, an up-to-date galley, the latest in Marconi wireless, the enlargement of the cadet gunroom and principal messes and the removal of the obsolete secondary armament.

After commissioning, Rainbow was assigned to the west coast of Canada and was the first Canadian ship to sail around South America by the Strait of Magellan. After a 12-week passage of over 15,000 nautical miles (28,000 km; 17,000 mi) the cruiser arrived at Esquimalt, British Columbia on 7 November 1910. However, after commissioning, the status of the Canadian vessels and their ability to operate without direction from the Admiralty kept the new ships within coastal waters. This limited Rainbow to fisheries patrols until the matter was settled. In 1911, the cruiser had her 6-pounder guns removed and replaced with QF 12-pounder 12 cwt naval guns. Her service was quiet on the west coast, performing ceremonial duties, training and coastal fisheries patrol, notably apprehending the American fishing schooner Edrie in February 1913 for illegal fishing. When Niobe was laid up in 1913, her crew was sent west to fill out Rainbow's complement.

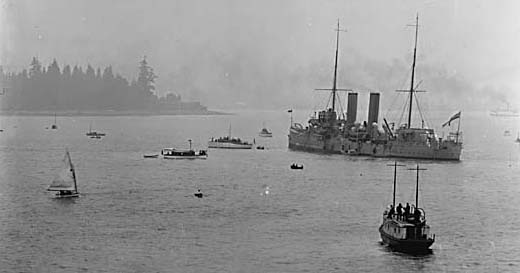
HMCS Rainbow in Vancouver's English Bay, where she was sent to guard the freighter Komagata Maru in July 1914

In July 1914, Rainbow was called to Vancouver to assist with an international incident that was unfolding. Komagata Maru, a Japanese merchant ship filled with Sikh immigrants from India, challenged Canada's immigration law, designed to prevent immigration from South Asia. The ship's passengers were not permitted to disembark even though they were British subjects and the ship had sat in Vancouver harbour for two months. After the local authorities were rebuffed in their attempts to make the ship leave, Rainbow was ordered to intervene. After some discussion with the passengers, who had taken over the vessel, those aboard Komagata Maru agreed to leave Vancouver only when supplies for the ship were provided. Komagata Maru sailed from Vancouver on 23 July, escorted by Rainbow. Twenty of the passengers were killed upon returning to Budge Budge, India, after they resisted an attempt to forcibly return them to Punjab.

When the First World War broke out, Rainbow was sent to cover the withdrawal of the British sloops, HMS Shearwater and HMS Algerine, which had been engaged protecting British citizens during civil unrest in Mexico. She was the largest armed ship the Allies had at the time in the western Pacific Ocean and was ordered to find and engage ships of the Imperial German Navy in the Pacific Ocean; in particular the light cruisers SMS Leipzig and SMS Nurnberg. Rainbow never met either of these ships, although she missed Leipzig by only a day at San Francisco. The vessel remained the only source of protection for shipping in western North America until the arrival of the Japanese armoured cruiser Izumo. Following the destruction of the German Pacific Fleet at the Battle of the Falkland Islands in December 1914, the greatest threat to shipping in Pacific was considered to be armed German raiders and Rainbow was considered to be a match for all but the fastest. However, in 1915, her patrols were shortened due to the lack of a collier to refuel Rainbow while out on patrol.

In early 1916, Rainbow was still patrolling the west coast of North America, performing reconnaissance on German shipping. On 23 April 1916, she seized the German-owned but American-flagged schooner Oregon and then followed that up by seizing the Mexican-flagged schooner Leonor on 2 May. The cruiser returned to Esquimalt with the prizes in tow on 30 May. In 1916 and early 1917, Rainbow was used to transport $140,000,000 in Russian gold bullion (valued in 1917 Canadian dollars), between Esquimalt and Vancouver. This money was placed in trust with Canada by the Russian government for protection due to the impending Russian revolution.

The Royal Canadian Navy found that the cost of operating Rainbow was using up too much of the West Coast naval operations budget, and the crew of Rainbow were sorely needed on the Atlantic coast for the fight against the U-boats. Rainbow was decommissioned and deactivated on 8 May 1917, her crew sent east. On 5 July she was recommissioned in Esquimalt as a depot ship. She served in this capacity until 1 June 1920, when she was sold for scrap to a Seattle shipbroker.

The ship's wheel is on display at the Canadian War Museum in Ottawa.
