= HMS Latona (1890) =

Apollo-class protected cruiser of the Royal Navy

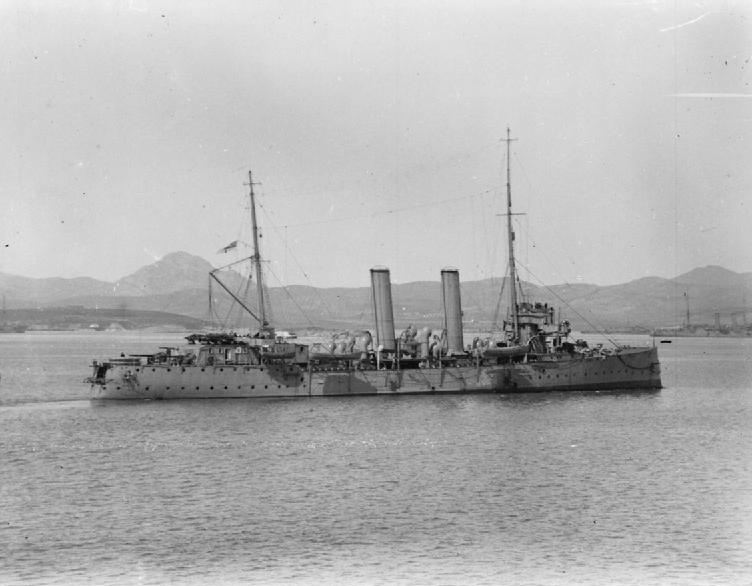
- HMS Latona at Mudros.

History

United Kingdom
- Name: HMS Latona
- Builder: Vickers, Barrow-in-Furness
- Laid down: April 1889
- Launched: 22 May 1890
- Reclassified: 1910 as a minelayer
- Fate: Sold on 22 December 1920

General characteristics
- Class & type: Apollo-class cruiser
- Displacement: 3,600 long tons (3,700 t)
- Length: 314 ft (96 m)
- Beam: 43 ft 6 in (13.26 m)
- Draught: 17 ft 6 in (5.33 m)
- Speed: 19.75 knots (22.73 mph; 36.58 km/h)
- Complement: 273 to 300 officers and men
- Armament: 2 × 6 in (150 mm) QF gun; 6 × QF 4.7-inch (120 mm) guns; 8 × 6-pounder guns; 2 to 4 × 14 in (360 mm) torpedo tubes

HMS Latona was an Apollo-class protected cruiser of the Royal Navy which served from 1890 to 1920.

== History ==
Under the Naval Defence Act 1889, HMS Latona was laid down on 22 August 1889. Built by Vickers at their Naval Construction Yard, Barrow-in-Furness Latona was launched on 22 May 1890 and completed in April 1891.

Latona was present at the Naval Review at Spithead on 26 June 1897 in celebration of the Diamond Jubilee of Queen Victoria. She served in the West Indies under Captain Baynes, and returned to Portsmouth from Bermuda on 27 January 1900, with the paid-off crew of HMS Indefatigable. During the tour she had encountered the barque Oxford in distress, and brought the crew of 16 to safety as the ship was leaking. She paid off at Portsmouth on 8 February 1900.

On 27 June 1900 Latona was ordered to be specially commissioned for a naval mobilization, to take place in July.

In August 1902 Latona was refit to become depot (supply) ship for submarines at Portsmouth, with the crew of the boats living on board her, and she was commissioned as such on 14 October 1902 by Captain Reginald Bacon, the Inspecting Captain of Submarines.

She was recommissioned at Chatham on 1 June 1908, then converted to minelayer in 1910.

In mid-1913, Latona was active with the Minelayer Squadron of the Second Fleet. Between 1 and 7 January 1916 she laid mines between Cape Alanguli and Apostula Island.

Between 13 and 14 December 1916 officers from ship were involved in an incident with aircraft coming from Kum-Kale.

HMS Latona was paid off on 23 December 1918 at Malta. In 1919 HMS Latona was placed on harbour duties. She was sold on 22 December 1920.

== Captains ==
Dates of appointment given:

- Henry Compton Anderson Baynes, 12 December 1899 – 8 February 1900
- Hugh Thomas Hibbert, 1 April 1905.
- Alexander Farrington, 1 July 1908.
- James Uchtred Farie, 15 February 1912.
- Rudolf Miles Burmester, 20 August 1913.
- Thomas Hector Molesworth Maurice, 25 July 1914.
- Cecil Vivian Usborne, 18 September 1916, and again on 1 February 1917.

== Publications ==
- Colledge, J. J.; Warlow, Ben (2006) [1969]. Ships of the Royal Navy: The Complete Record of All Fighting Ships of the Royal Navy from the 15th Century to the Present (3rd Rev ed.). London: Chatham Publishing. ISBN 978-1-86176-281-8. OCLC 67375475.
