= HMS Sirius (1890) =

Apollo-class cruiser

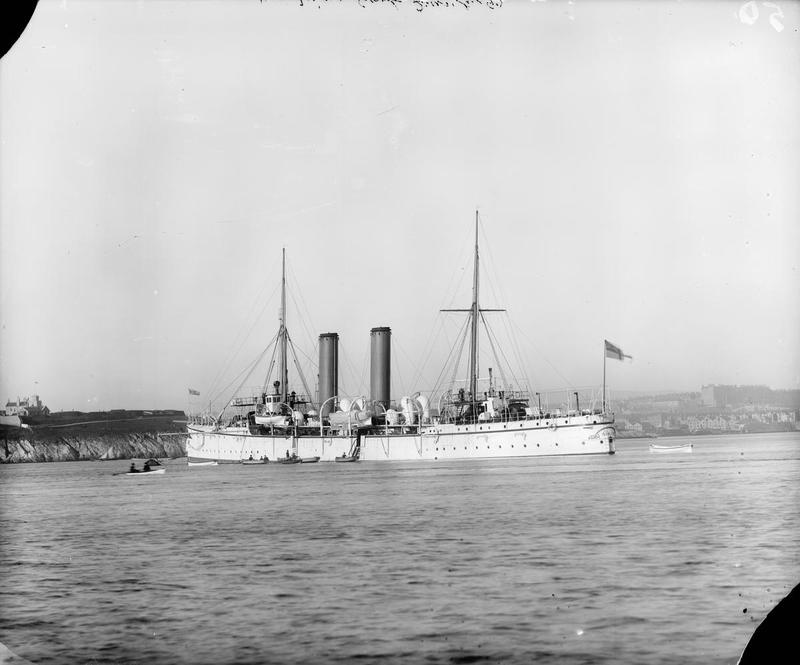
- HMS Sirius (IWM Q46044)

History

United Kingdom
- Name: HMS Sirius
- Builder: Armstrong, Elswick
- Laid down: September 1889
- Launched: 27 October 1890
- Commissioned: 1892
- Fate: Scuttled as blockship 23 April 1918

General characteristics
- Class & type: Apollo-class cruiser
- Displacement: 3,600 long tons (3,700 t)
- Length: 300 ft (91.4 m) pp; 314 ft (95.7 m) oa
- Beam: 43 ft 8 in (13.31 m)
- Draught: 18 ft 6 in (5.6 m)
- Propulsion: 2 shafts, 2-cylinder triple expansion steam engines; 5 boilers; 7,000 ihp (5,200 kW) (natural draught); 9,000 ihp (6,700 kW) (forced draught)
- Speed: 19.75 kn (36.58 km/h; 22.73 mph) (forced draught)
- Complement: 273
- Armament: 2 × QF 6-inch (152 mm) guns; 6 × QF 4.7-inch (120 mm) guns; 8 × 6-pounders; 1 × 3-pounder; 4 × 14-inch (356 mm) torpedo tubes
- Armour: Deck:1.25–2 in (32–51 mm); Conning tower:3 in (76 mm); Gunshields:4.5 in (110 mm)

HMS Sirius was an Apollo-class cruiser of the British Royal Navy which served from 1892 to 1918 in various colonial posts such as the South and West African coastlines and off the British Isles during the First World War.

== Design and construction ==
The Naval Defence Act 1889 resulted in orders being placed for 21 second-class protected cruisers of the Apollo-class, of which, two, HMS Sirius and HMS Spartan, were ordered from Armstrong's Elswick shipyard.

Sirius had an overall length of 300 ft (91.4 m) a beam of 43 ft 8 in (13.31 m) and a draught of 18 ft 6 in (5.64 m). Displacement was 3,600 long tons (3,700 t). She was one of 10 ships of the class that was sheathed in wood and copper to reduce fouling. An armoured deck of between 1 1/4 inches (32 mm) and 2 inches (51 mm) protected the ship's magazines and machinery, while the ship's conning tower had 3 inches (76 mm) of armour and the gunshields 4 1/2 inches (110 mm). Two QF 6-inch (152 mm) guns were mounted fore and aft on the ship's centreline, while six 4.7 in (120 mm) guns were mounted three on each broadside. 8 six pounder guns and 1 three pounder provided protection against torpedo boats.

Sirius was laid down in September 1889, launched on 27 October 1890 and entered service in September 1891.

== Service ==
Sirius served off America from 1892 to 1895 and on the China Station from 1903 to 1905. On return from overseas, she went into reserve at Devonport. In February 1912, Sirius became part of the training squadron.

In October 1914 Sirius was one of a number of obsolete warships deployed to support Belgian troops during the Battle of the Yser, carrying out shore bombardments from 23 October. Sirius served as part of the Nore Command from 1914 to March 1915, being used as a guard ship on the east coast of the United Kingdom, and was then sent to serve off West Africa, where she remained on station until 1918.

In April 1918, Sirius was scuttled in the mouth of Ostend harbour in Belgium during the failed First Ostend Raid. This operation was intended to block the harbour mouth and prevent the transit of German U-boats and other raiding craft from Bruges to the North Sea. German countermeasures were too effective, however, and Sirius and her sister ship and fellow blockship HMS Brilliant were eventually scuttled by their crews outside the harbour mouth on 23 April 1918 after running aground on a sandbank. The wrecks were broken up after the war.

== Notes ==
=== References ===
- Brook, Peter (1999). Warships for Export: Armstrong Warships 1867–1927. Gravesend, UK: World Ship Society. ISBN 0-905617-89-4.
- Chesneau, Roger; Kolesnik, Eugene M (1979). Conway's All The World's Fighting Ships 1860–1905. London: Conway Maritime Press. ISBN 0-85177-133-5.
- Colledge, J. J.; Warlow, Ben (2006) [1969]. Ships of the Royal Navy: The Complete Record of All Fighting Ships of the Royal Navy from the 15th Century to the Present (3rd Rev ed.). London: Chatham Publishing. ISBN 978-1-86176-281-8. OCLC 67375475.
- Corbett, Julian S. (1920). History of the Great War: Naval Operations: Vol. I: To the Battle of the Falklands December 1914. London: Longmans, Green and Co.
- Corbett, Julian S. (1921). History of the Great War: Naval Operations: Vol. II. London: Longmans, Green and Co.
- Gardiner, Robert; Gray, Randal (1985). Conway's All The World's Fighting Ships 1906–1921. London: Conway Maritime Press. ISBN 0-85177-245-5.
- Monograph No. 18: The Dover Command: Vol I (PDF). Naval Staff Monographs (Historical). Vol. VI. The Naval Staff, Training and Staff Duties Division. 1922.
