= HMS Melpomene =

Seven ships of the Royal Navy have been named HMS Melpomene after the Muse of Tragedy in ancient Greek mythology.

- HMS Melpomene (1794) was a 38-gun fifth-rate frigate captured in 1794 and sold in 1815 after service in the French Revolutionary and Napoleonic Wars.
- HMS Melpomene (1815) was a 38-gun French frigate launched in 1812 that the Royal Navy captured in 1815 and sold in 1821.
- HMS Melpomene (1857) was a screw frigate launched in 1857 and sold in 1875.
- HMS Melpomene (1888) was a Marathon-class light cruiser launched in 1888 and sold in 1905.
- HMS Melpomene was an Apollo-class protected cruiser launched in 1891 as HMS Indefatigable. She was renamed HMS Melpomone in 1910 and was sold in 1913.
- HMS Melpomene (1915) was a Medea-class destroyer, built for the Greek Navy as the Samos. She was purchased in 1914 and launched in 1915. She was broken up in 1921.
- HMS Melpomene was a minelayer, formerly the monitor HMS M31 launched in 1915. She was renamed HMS Melpomene in 1922 and HMS Menelaus in 1940, being broken up in 1948.

== See also ==
- HMS La Melpomene was a French destroyer seized in 1940, operated by the Free French Naval Forces between 1940 and 1942, and by the Royal Navy from 1942 until 1946, when she was returned to the French Navy.
