= Katoomba (disambiguation) =

Katoomba is the main town of the City of Blue Mountains in New South Wales, Australia.

Katoomba may also refer to:

- Katoomba (crater), on Mars
- HMS Katoomba, Royal Navy ship built in 1889
- SS Katoomba, passenger ship built in 1913
- HMAS Katoomba, Royal Australian Navy ship built in 1941
