= Indefatigable =

Indefatigable may refer to:

== Ships ==
- HMS Indefatigable, several ships of the name in the British Royal Navy
- TS Indefatigable, a British training ship
- Indefatigable-class battlecruiser
- Indefatigable (1799 ship), a merchant ship used to transport convicts to Australia
- Indefatigable (a.k.a. "The Indie"), a key ship in the Horatio Hornblower series of novels by C. S. Forester

== Other uses ==
- Indefatigable gas field, a petroleum gas field
- Indefatigable SW, a petroleum gas field; see Bacton Gas Terminal
- Indefatigable Island, in the Galapagos
- Mount Indefatigable, a mountain in Canada
