= Melpomene elegans =

Scientific classification
- Domain: Eukaryota
- Kingdom: Animalia
- Phylum: Arthropoda
- Subphylum: Chelicerata
- Class: Arachnida
- Order: Araneae
- Infraorder: Araneomorphae
- Family: Agelenidae
- Genus: Melpomene
- Species: M. elegans

Binomial name
- Melpomene elegans O. Pickard-Cambridge, 1898

Synonyms
- Agelenopsis elegans F. O. Pickard-Cambridge, 1902; Agelena elegans Petrunkevitch, 1911

Species of spider

Melpomene elegans is a species of spider in the family Agelenidae. It is found in Mexico.
