= Plas Llanfair =

Coordinates: 53.218426°N 4.199217°W

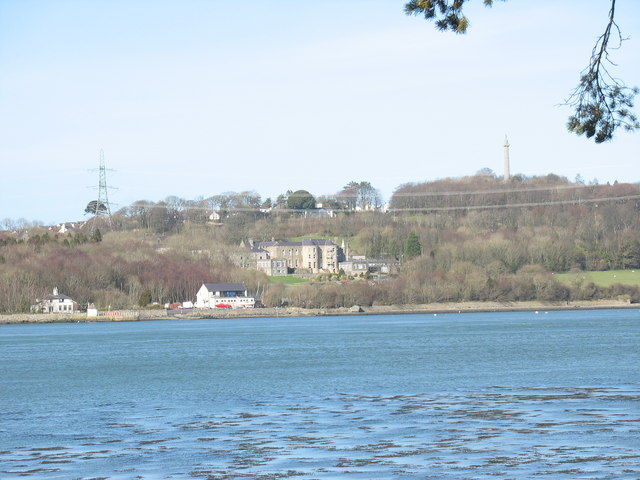

- Location within Anglesey
- OS grid reference: SH 5326 7130
  - Cardiff: 127.6 mi (205.4 km)
  - London: 208.5 mi (335.5 km)
- Community: Llanfair Pwllgwyngyll
- Principal area: Anglesey
- Country: Wales
- Sovereign state: United Kingdom
- Post town: Llanfair Pwllgwyngyll
- Police: North Wales
- Fire: North Wales
- Ambulance: Welsh
- UK Parliament: Ynys Môn
- Senedd Cymru – Welsh Parliament: Bangor Conwy Môn

Plas Llanfair is a former country estate and mansion in the community of Llanfair Pwllgwyngyll, Anglesey, Wales.

The present house was built in the early 19th century. It served as a nautical training school in the second half of the 20th century and the site is now owned by the Ministry of Defence.

== See also ==
- List of localities in Wales by population
