= HMS Spartan (1891) =

Apollo-class cruiser

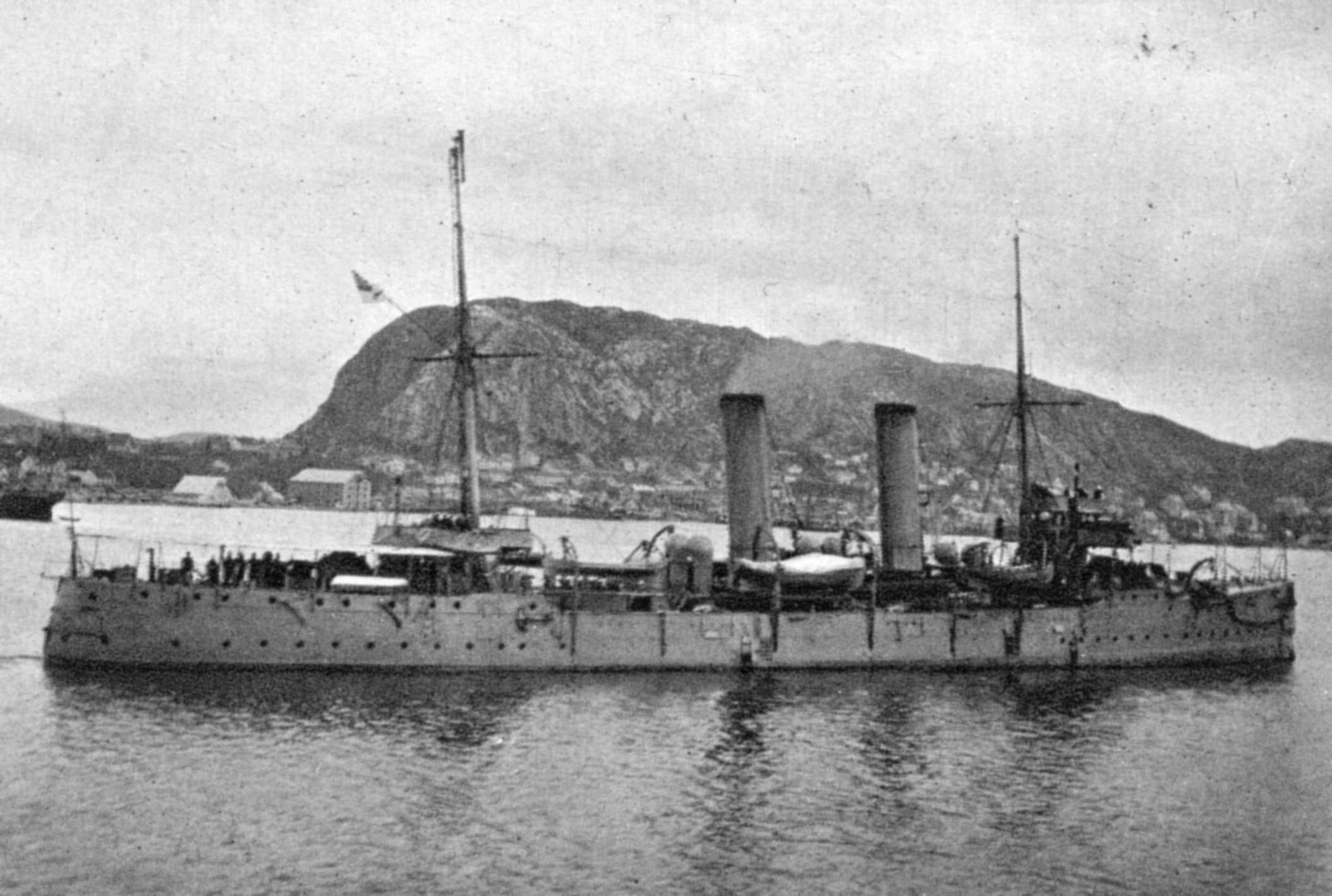
- HMS Spartan, 1904

History

United Kingdom
- Name: HMS Spartan
- Builder: Armstrong Mitchell
- Launched: 25 February 1891
- Renamed: Defiance II in August 1921
- Fate: Sold to breakers on 26 June 1931

General characteristics
- Class & type: Apollo-class cruiser
- Displacement: 3,440 tons
- Length: 314 ft (95.7 m)
- Beam: 43.5 ft (13.3 m)
- Draught: 17.5 ft (5.3 m)
- Propulsion: reciprocating 9000 hp, 2 shafts
- Speed: 20 kn (37 km/h; 23 mph)
- Complement: 273 to 300 (Officers and Men)
- Armament: As built: 2 × QF 6-inch (152.4 mm) guns; 6 × QF 4.7-inch (120 mm) guns; 8 × 6 pounder guns; 2 to 4 × 14-inch torpedo tubes

HMS Spartan was an Apollo-class cruiser of the Royal Navy constructed in 1891. The design was a variant of the Marathon-class cruiser. The ships had quick firing guns which were effective as a broadside, but less so when attempting to fire fore or aft.

In late 1899 she had a refit, and when completed in early February 1900 she was placed in the A division of the Devonport Fleet reserve. From 1907 she was placed on harbour duty. In 1921 she became part of the Royal Navy torpedo school at Devonport, HMS Defiance, which was based in floating obsolete ships, and named for the first ship which had housed the school. Spartan became Defiance II in August 1921. She was sold for scrapping on 26 June 1931.
