= HMS Phoebe (1890) =

Pearl-class cruiser of the Royal Navy launched in 1890

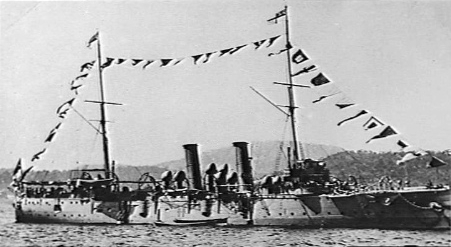
- HMS Phoebe in Hobart, Tasmania in 1903.

History

United Kingdom
- Name: HMS Phoebe
- Builder: HMNB Devonport
- Launched: 1 July 1890
- Fate: Sold in July 1906 for breaking up.

General characteristics
- Class & type: Pearl-class cruiser
- Displacement: 2,575 tons
- Length: 278 ft (85 m) oa; 256 ft (78 m) pp
- Beam: 41 ft (12 m)
- Draught: 15 ft 6 in (4.72 m)
- Installed power: 7,500 ihp (5,600 kW) on forced draught
- Propulsion: 2 × 3-cylinder triple-expansion steam engines; 4 × double-ended cylindrical boilers; 2 screws
- Speed: 19 knots (35 km/h; 22 mph)
- Complement: 217
- Armament: 8 × QF 4.7 in (120 mm) guns; 8 × 3-pounder guns; 4 × machine guns; 2 × 14 in (360 mm) torpedo tubes
- Armour: Deck: 1–2 in (25–51 mm); Gunshields: 2 in (51 mm); Conning tower: 3 in (76 mm)

HMS Phoebe was a Pearl-class cruiser of the Royal Navy, in service from the early 1890s until 1906.

== Service history ==
Phoebe was built at the HMNB Devonport and launched on 1 July 1890. She served as part of the Cape and West Africa Station from 1893 until 1897. During this time, she participated in the Benin Expedition. After spending two years in reserve, she left Plymouth for Australia in early March 1901 to commence service on the Australia Station, under Commander (later Captain) Francis Charles Bathurst Addington. She left the Australia Station on 23 December 1905 for England.

== Fate ==
She was paid off and sold in July 1906 to A.Anderson, Copenhagen.

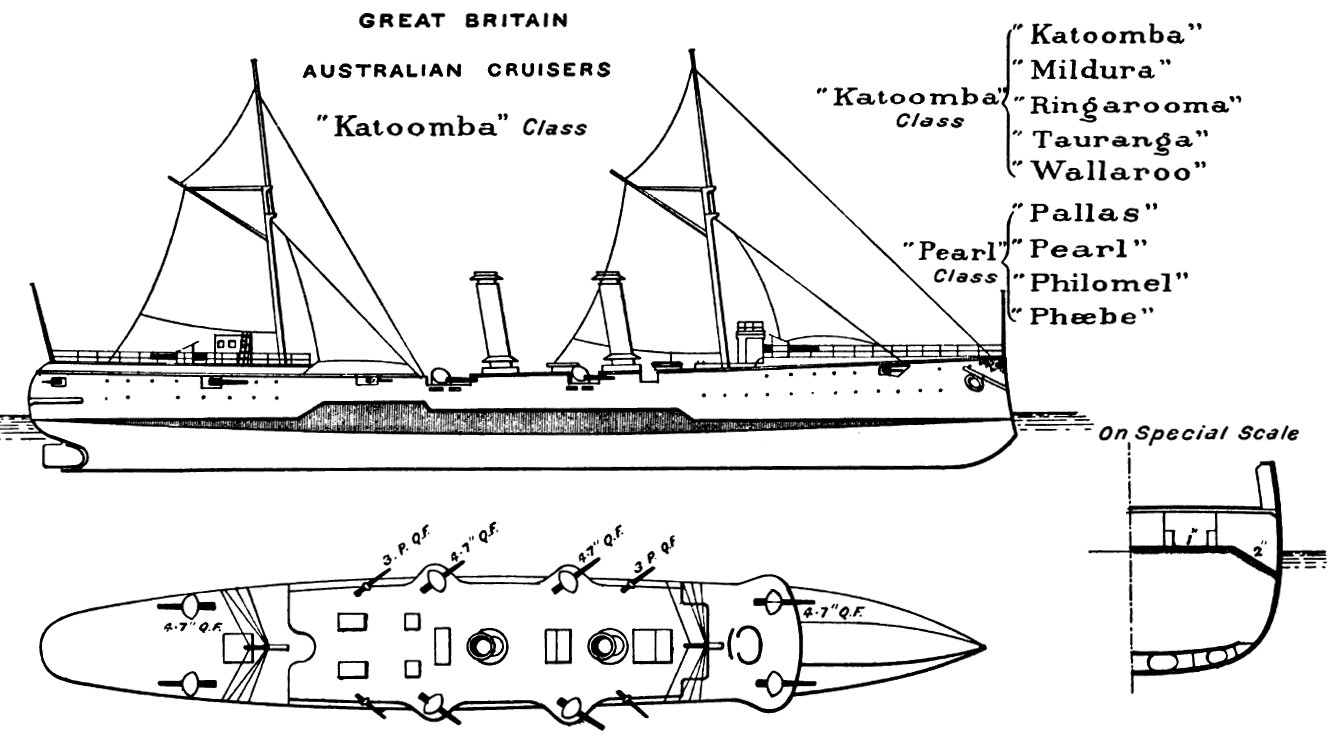
A Pearl-class cruiser from Brassey's Naval Annual, 1897
