= HMS Wallaroo =

Pearl-class cruiser

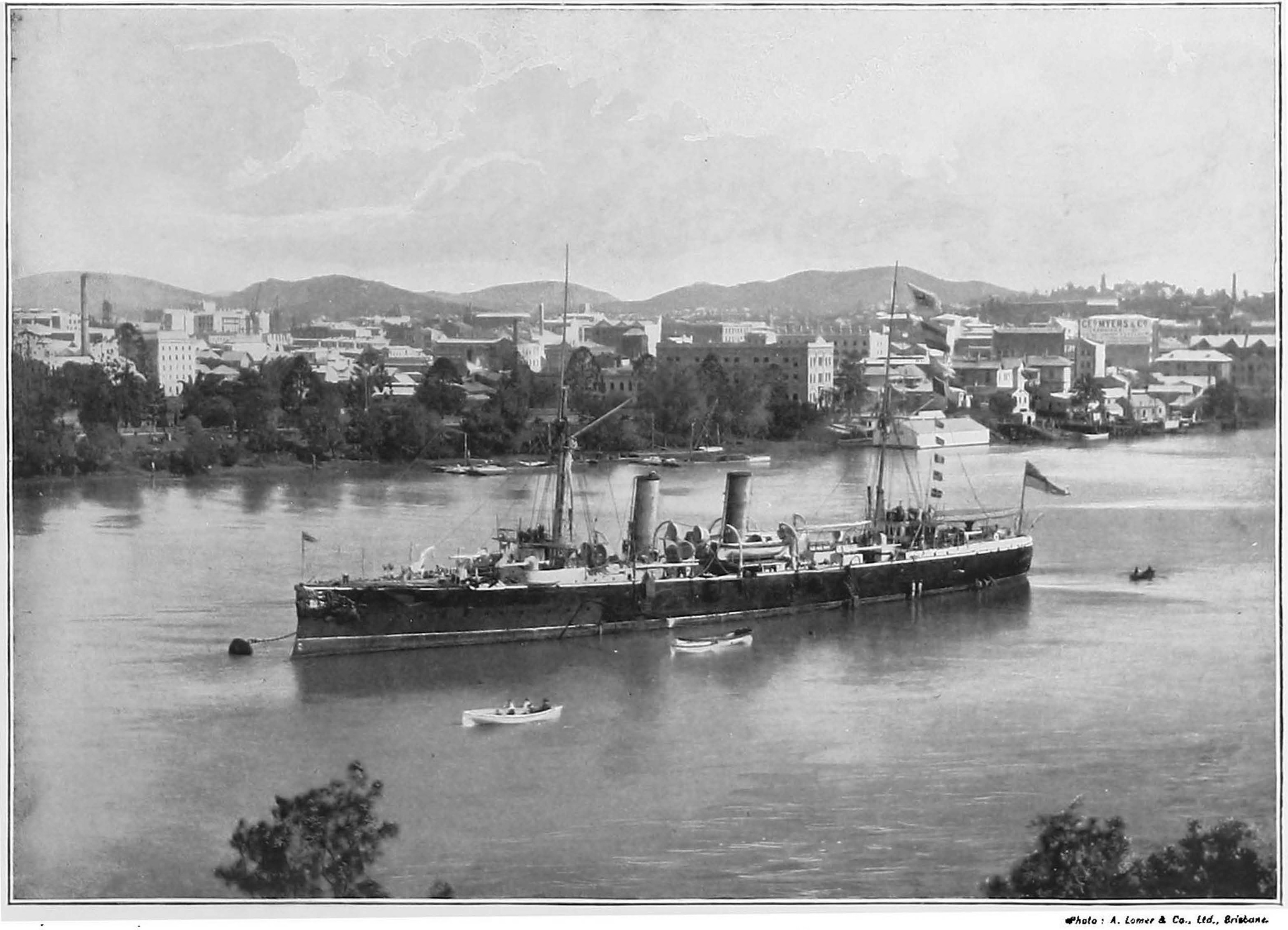
- HMS Wallaroo on the Brisbane River

History

United Kingdom
- Name: HMS Persian (1890); HMS Wallaroo (1890–1906, 1920); HMS Wallington (1919–1920)
- Builder: Armstrong, Mitchell, Elswick
- Laid down: 15 August 1888
- Launched: 5 February 1890
- Completed: 27 January 1891
- Fate: Sold for scrap, February 1920

General characteristics
- Class & type: Pearl-class cruiser
- Displacement: 2,575 tons
- Length: 278 ft (84.7 m) (oa); 265 ft (80.8 m) (pp)
- Beam: 41 ft (12 m)
- Draught: 15 ft 6 in (4.7 m)
- Installed power: 7,500 shp (5,600 kW); 4 × boilers
- Propulsion: 2 × screws; 2 × 3-cylinder triple-expansion steam engines
- Speed: 19 knots (35 km/h; 22 mph)
- Complement: 210
- Armament: 8 × QF 4.7 inch (120 mm) guns; 8 × 3-pounder guns; 4 × 14-inch (356 mm) torpedo tubes
- Armour: Deck: 1–2 inches (25–51 mm); Gun shields: 2 in; Conning tower: 3 inches (76 mm)

HMS Wallaroo was a Pearl-class cruiser built for the Royal Navy, originally named HMS Persian, built by Armstrong, Mitchell, Elswick, Newcastle upon Tyne and launched on 5 February 1890.

Renamed on 2 April 1890 as Wallaroo (after the town of Wallaroo, South Australia) the cruiser was part of the Auxiliary Squadron of the Australia Station. She arrived in Sydney with the squadron on 5 September 1891. She was placed into reserve upon arrival until 9 May 1894. She was sent to serve in China during the Boxer Rebellion in 1900. On 6 January 1904 while sailing off Montague Island, one of her boilers exploded killing four and wounding three. She left the Australia Station on 11 January 1906.

She was attached to HMS Indus as a training ship for mechanics at Devonport. She became a guard ship at Chatham in November 1914. She was then stationed off Brightlingsea, Essex, as the base ship for the boom and net-protected Swin Anchorage, returning to Chatham in 1916. Her captains between late 1914 and 1916 included Commanders Calderon, Ingham, and West, with Rear-Admiral Charles Napier as overall commander of the Brightlingsea naval base also named "Wallaroo". The ship was often overflown by raiding Zeppelins and once fired on one. She was renamed HMS Wallington in March 1919. She was sold in 1920, as Wallaroo to G. Sharpe for breaking up.

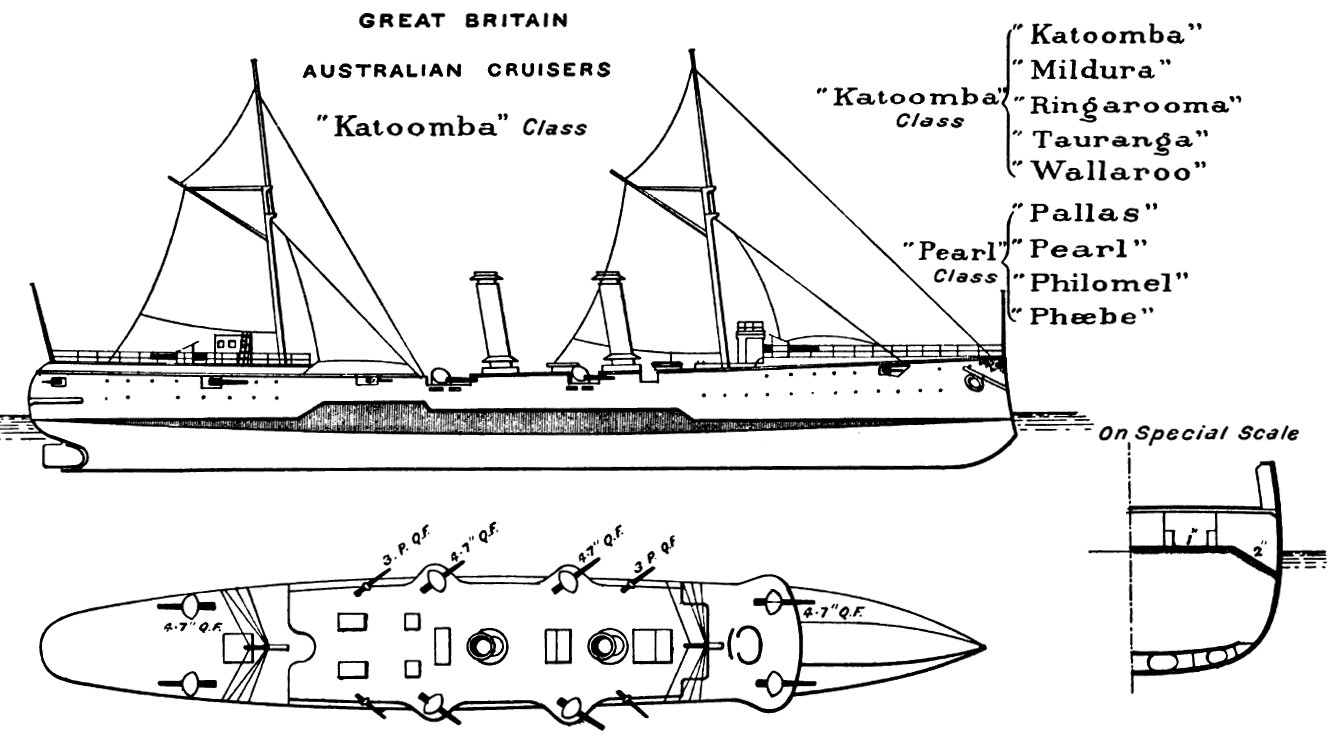
A Pearl-class cruiser from Brassey's Naval Annual, 1897
