= Apollo-class cruiser =

Ships built for the Royal Navy

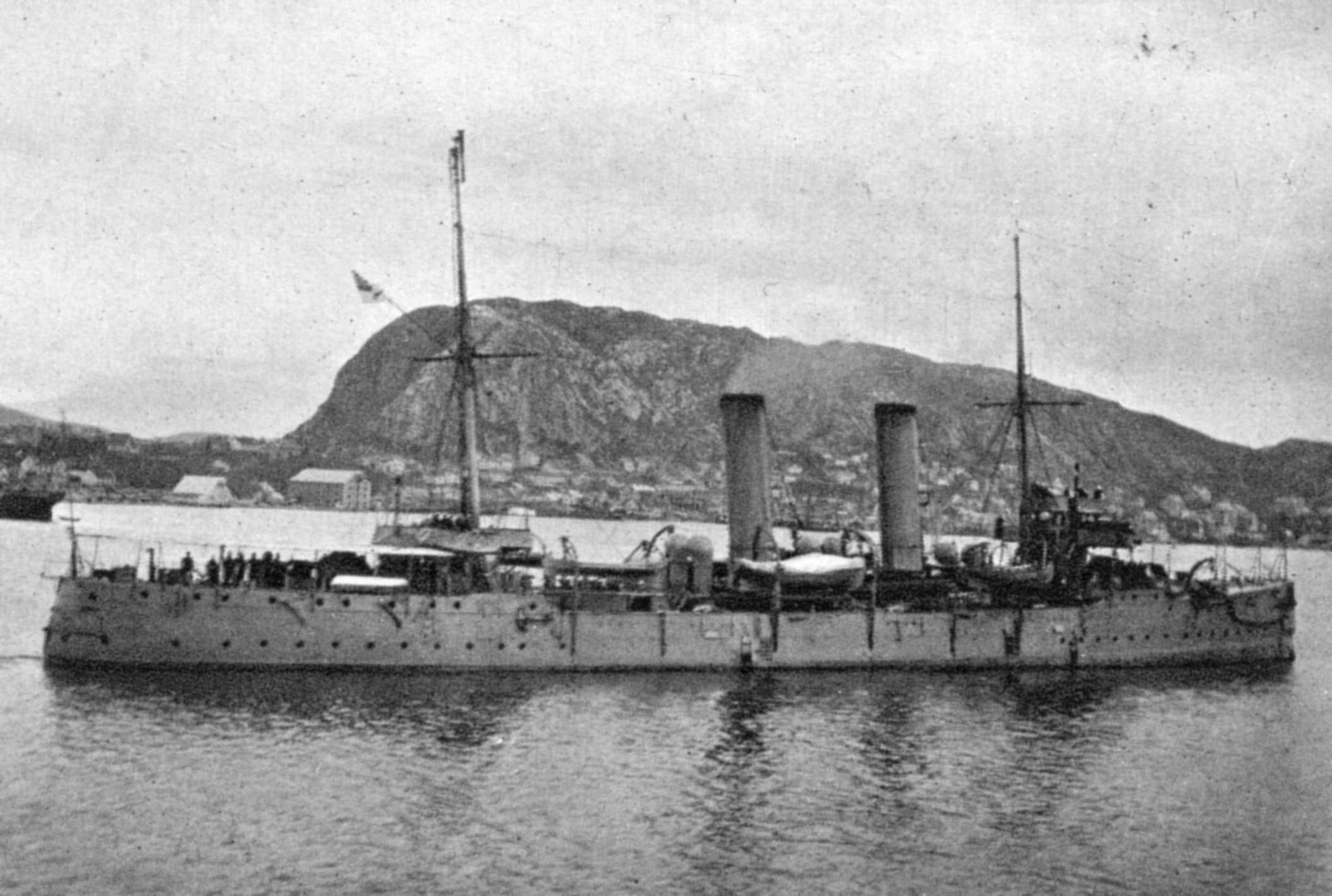
- HMS Spartan, pictured in Norwegian waters in 1904

Class overview
- Name: Apollo class
- Operators: Royal Navy; Royal Canadian Navy
- Preceded by: Pearl class
- Succeeded by: Astraea class
- Built: 1889–1892
- In commission: 1889–1931
- Completed: 21
- Lost: 1
- Scrapped: 15

General characteristics
- Type: Protected cruiser
- Displacement: 3,600 long tons (3,700 t)
- Length: 314 ft (96 m)
- Beam: 43 ft 6 in (13.26 m)
- Draught: 17 ft 6 in (5.33 m)
- Speed: 19.75 knots (36.58 km/h; 22.73 mph)
- Complement: 273 to 300
- Armament: 2 × 6-inch (152 mm) QF guns; 6 × QF 4.7-inch (120 mm) guns; 8 × 6-pounder guns; 2 to 4 × 14 in (360 mm) torpedo tubes

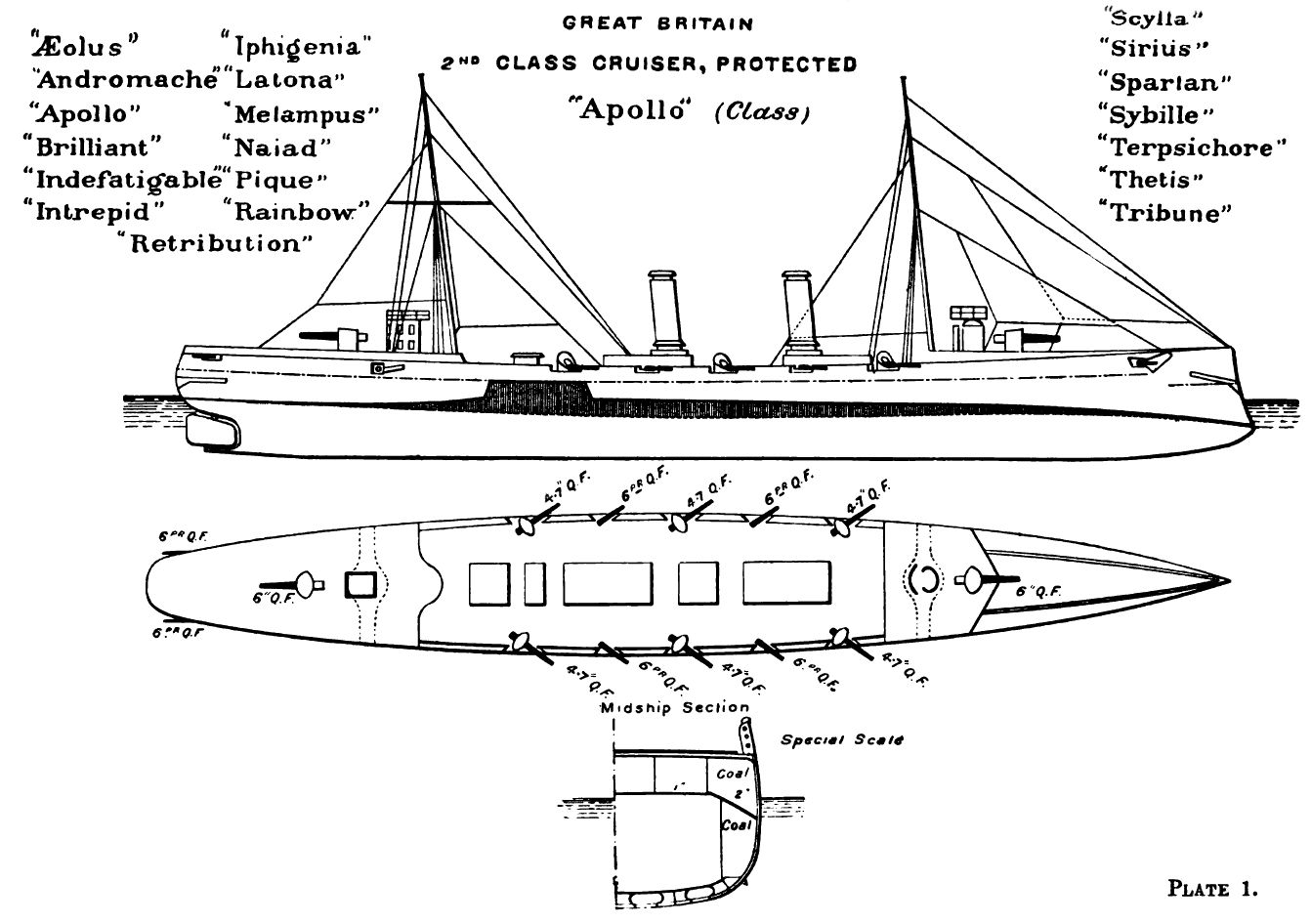
Right elevation and deck plan as depicted in Brassey's Naval Annual 1897

The Apollo class were second-class protected cruisers designed by Sir William White and built for the Royal Navy in the late 19th century. Twenty-one ships of this class were built, making it the largest single class of steel cruisers ever built for the Royal Navy to the same design.

== Design and construction ==
The design followed White's standard pattern for smaller steel cruisers, being of protected type (with an internal curved steel armour deck protecting the machinery spaces) and featuring low freeboard amidships with raised bulwarks connecting the forecastle and poop for weatherliness. It drew heavily from the slightly earlier Medea, but with enlarged dimensions and a revised armament which, for the first time in Royal Navy 2nd-class cruisers, included the new 4.7-inch quick-firing gun. Six of these were carried; three on each side of the main deck. Two 6-inch guns were carried on the centreline, one at either end of the ship upon the forecastle and the poop.

Ten ships of the class were sheathed and coppered for tropical service. These were; Aeolus, Brilliant, Indefatigable, Intrepid, Iphigenia, Pique, Rainbow, Retribution, Sirius and Spartan. The sheathing added 200 tons to each ship's displacement and reduced their speed by a quarter of a knot.

Critical opinion of the design was that it was an improvement on the Medea, but still rather small. In practice they proved to be wet ships and poor seaboats, the low deck amidships being a factor.

Twenty-one ships of this class were ordered under the Naval Defence Act 1889, making up half of the act's required forty-two cruisers. The obvious limitations of the Apollos led to a further enlarged & improved design (the Astraea class) being drawn up by White, of which eight units were also ordered under the Naval Defence Act.

== Service ==
Ships of this class served during the Boer War.

Sybille was wrecked 16 January 1901.

Latona, Apollo, Intrepid, Iphigenia, Andromache, Naiad and Thetis were converted into minelaying cruisers around 1907.

In 1910 Rainbow was transferred to the Royal Canadian Navy. In the same year, Indefatigable was renamed Melpomene to make her original name available for a new battle-cruiser.

After nearly two decades of service, the ships were becoming worn out and units of the class were being progressively sold off in the early 1910s; Melampus in 1910, Pique, Retribution and Tribune in 1911, Melpomene in 1913, and Aeolus, Scylla & Terpsichore in 1914. The remainder found a reprieve with the outbreak of the First World War.

By the last year of the First World War, the surviving ships were no longer of any fighting value, and six of this class were converted into blockships to be scuttled in the entrances to enemy-occupied ports in Belgium. The cruisers Intrepid, Iphigenia and Thetis were expended on 23 April 1918 in the raid on Zeebrugge, Brilliant and Sirius were unsuccessfully expended in the similar raid on Ostend. A further attempt to block Ostend took place in May, with Sappho and Vindictive (the latter being of the Arrogant class) as blockships, but Sappho broke down en route to Ostend and returned to port.

Spartan was renamed Defiance in 1921.

The surviving members of the class were for disposal after the war, mostly being sold between 1920 and 1922, with only Defiance being retained (as part of the torpedo school at Devonport) until finally sold in 1931.

== Ships ==
Apollo-class cruisers
Name	Builder	Laid down	Launched	Completed	Fate	Notes
Andromache	Chatham Dockyard	29 April 1889	14 August 1890	December 1891	Broken up in 1920	Andromache-type minelayer
Apollo	Chatham Dockyard	27 May 1889	10 February 1891	April 1892	Broken up in 1920	Andromache-type minelayer
Latona	Vickers, Barrow-in-Furness	22 August 1889	22 May 1890	April 1891	Sold in 1920	Andromache-type minelayer
Melampus	Vickers, Barrow-in-Furness	30 August 1889	2 August 1890	December 1891	Broken up in 1910	
Naiad	Vickers, Barrow-in-Furness	3 October 1889	29 November 1890	January 1892	Broken up in 1922	Andromache-type minelayer
Sappho	Samuda Brothers, Poplar	29 October 1889	9 May 1891	February 1893	Broken up in 1921	
Scylla	Samuda Brothers, Poplar	29 October 1889	17 October 1891	April 1893	Broken up in 1914	
Sybille	Robert Stephenson, Hebburn	11 October 1889	27 December 1890	May 1894	Wrecked in 1901	
Terpsichore	J & G Thomson, Clydebank	27 August 1889	30 October 1890	April 1892	Broken up in 1914	
Thetis	J & G Thomson, Clydebank	29 October 1889	13 December 1890	April 1892	Expended as blockship in 1918	Andromache-type minelayer
Tribune	J & G Thomson, Clydebank	11 December 1889	24 February 1891	May 1892	Broken up in 1912 at Sharpness by John Cashmore	
Aeolus	Devonport Dockyard	19 March 1890	13 November 1891	June 1893	Broken up in 1914	
Brilliant	Sheerness Dockyard	24 March 1890	24 June 1891	April 1893	Expended as blockship in 1918	
Indefatigable	London & Glasgow	6 September 1889	12 March 1891	April 1892	Broken up in 1913	
Intrepid	London & Glasgow	6 September 1889	20 June 1891	November 1892	Expended as blockship in 1918	Intrepid-type minelayer
Iphigenia	London & Glasgow	17 March 1890	19 November 1891	May 1893	Expended as blockship in 1918	Intrepid-type minelayer
Pique	Palmers, Jarrow	30 October 1889	13 December 1890	March 1893	Broken up in 1911	
Rainbow	Palmers, Jarrow	30 December 1889	25 March 1891	January 1893	1910 to Royal Canadian Navy as HMCS Rainbow. Sold in 1920	
Retribution	Palmers, Jarrow	31 January 1890	6 August 1891	May 1893	Broken up in 1911	
Sirius	Armstrong Mitchell, Elswick	7 October 1889	27 October 1890	April 1892	Expended as blockship in 1918	
Spartan	Armstrong Mitchell, Elswick	16 December 1889	25 February 1891	July 1892	Broken up in 1931	
Sources: Conway's 1860–1905, p. 77; Jane's, p. 62; Cocker, p.26-27.

== Publications ==
- Cocker, M.P. (1993). Mine Warfare Vessels of the Royal Navy: 1908 to Date. Shrewsbury, England: Airlife Publishing. ISBN 1-85310-328-4.
- Colledge, J. J.; Warlow, Ben (2006) [1969]. Ships of the Royal Navy: The Complete Record of All Fighting Ships of the Royal Navy from the 15th Century to the Present (3rd Rev ed.). London: Chatham Publishing. ISBN 978-1-86176-281-8. OCLC 67375475.
