= HMS Indefatigable (1891) =

Apollo-class cruiser

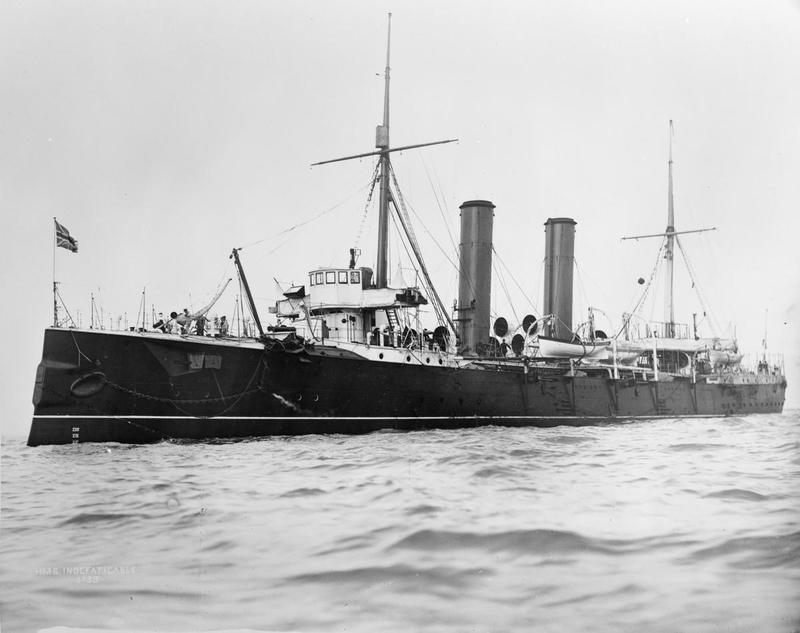
- Indefatigable in 1894

History

United Kingdom
- Name: HMS Indefatigable
- Builder: London and Glasgow Shipbuilding Company, Glasgow
- Laid down: 1890
- Launched: 12 March 1891
- Commissioned: 1892
- Renamed: HMS Melpomene in 1910
- Fate: Sold 7 October 1913

General characteristics
- Class & type: Apollo-class cruiser
- Displacement: 3,400 long tons (3,500 t)
- Length: 314 ft (95.7 m)
- Beam: 43 ft (13.1 m)
- Draught: 17.5 ft (5.3 m)
- Propulsion: 2-shaft steam reciprocating engines; 5 boilers; 7000 ihp (natural draught); 9000 ihp (forced draught)
- Speed: 20 knots (23 mph; 37 km/h)
- Complement: 273 to 300 (Officers and Men)
- Armament: 2 × QF 6-inch (152.4 mm) guns; 6 × QF 4.7-inch (120 mm) guns; 8 × QF 6-pounder Hotchkiss guns; 4 × 14 in (360 mm) torpedo tubes
- Armor: Conning tower: 3 in (76 mm); Decks: 2–1.25 in (51–32 mm); Engine hatch: 5 in (130 mm)

HMS Indefatigable, was a second-class Apollo-class protected cruiser of the British Royal Navy. The ship was built by the London and Glasgow Shipbuilding Company of Glasgow between 1890 and 1892, launching on 12 March 1891. In 1910, the ship was renamed HMS Melpomene, and in 1913 was sold for scrap.

== Design and construction ==
The Naval Defence Act 1889 resulted in orders being placed for 21 second-class protected cruisers of the Apollo-class, together with 8 of the larger and better armed development, the Astraea class. The Apollo-class were an enlarged version of the Marathon-class cruiser built under the 1887–1888 shipbuilding programme. Three Apollos, Indefatigable, Iphigenia and Intrepid were ordered from the London and Glasgow Shipbuilding Company.

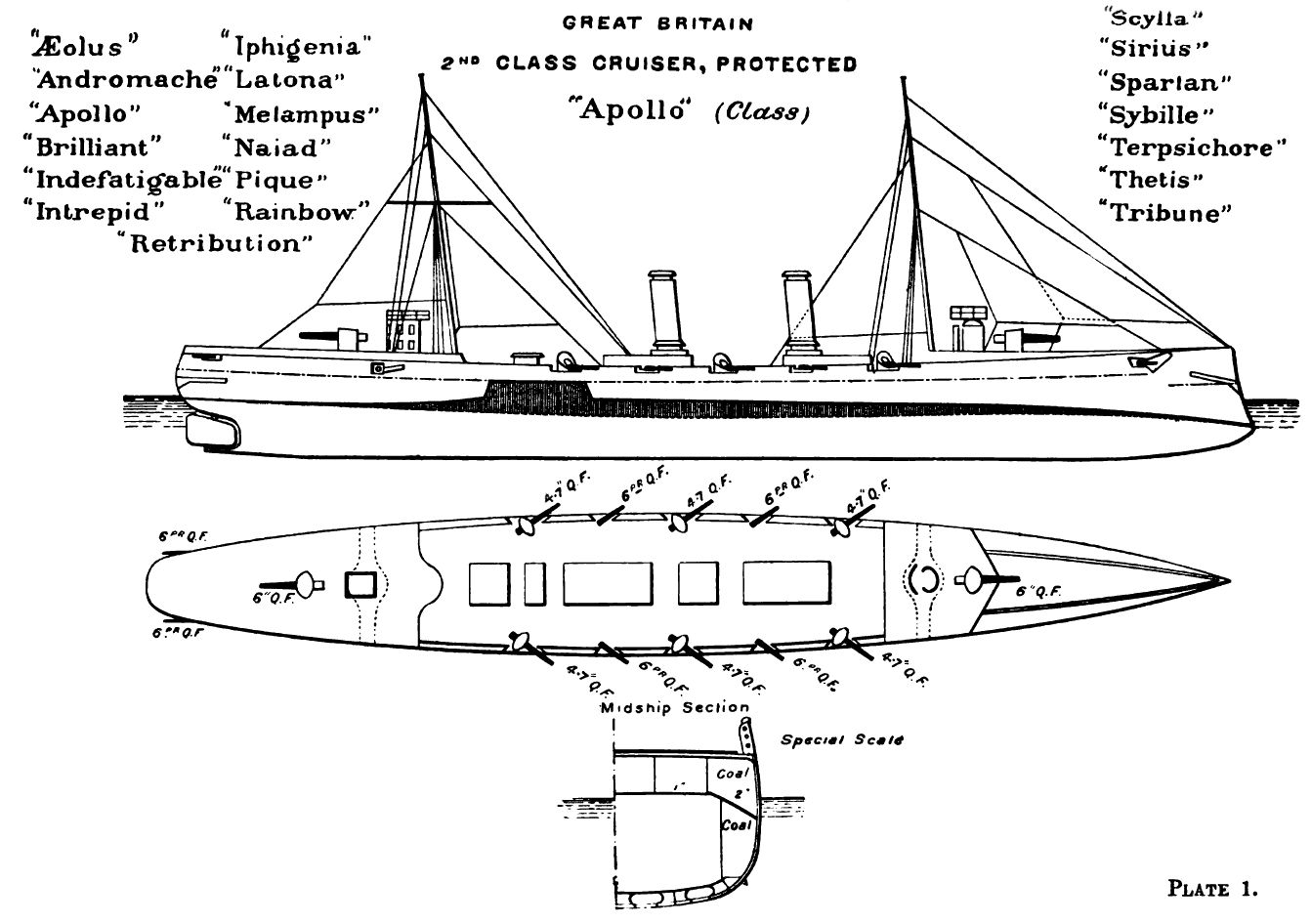
Diagram of an Apollo-class cruiser

Indefatigable was one of 10 ships of the class that were sheathed in wood and copper to reduce fouling when serving in tropical waters. She was 314 ft 0 in (95.71 m) long overall and 300 ft (91.44 m) between perpendiculars, with a beam of 43 ft 8 in (13.31 m) and a draught of 18 ft 6 in (5.64 m). Displacement was 3,600 long tons (3,700 t). Five cylindrical fire-tube boilers fed steam to two Triple-expansion engines rated at 7,000 ihp (5,200 kW) natural draught and 9,000 ihp (6,700 kW) with forced draught. This gave a design speed with forced draught of 18.75 kn (21.6 mph; 34.7 km/h).

An armoured deck of between 1 1/4 inches (32 mm) and 2 inches (51 mm) protected the ship's magazines and machinery, while the ship's conning tower had 3 inches (76 mm) of armour and the gunshields 4 1/2 inches (110 mm). Two QF 6-inch (152 mm) guns were mounted fore and aft on the ship's centreline, while six 4.7 in (120 mm) guns were mounted three on each broadside. 8 six pounder guns and 1 three pounder provided protection against torpedo boats.

Indefatigable was laid down as Yard number 264 at London and Glasgow's Govan shipyard in 1890 and launched on 12 March 1891 and completed in 1892.

== Service ==
From 1899 to 1903, Indefatigable served as part of the North America and West Indies Station, being recommissioned at Bermuda in January 1900. She was in Port of Spain in late 1902, when in December that year she was ordered to take part in an Anglo-German blockade of the coast of Venezuela during the Venezuelan crisis of 1902–1903. Following the end of the blockade, she left Trinidad for Grenada in late February 1903.

In 1905, Indefatigable went into reserve at Portsmouth, recommissioning in January 1906 as part of the 4th Cruiser Squadron on the North America and West Indies Station. On 11 January 1910, she was renamed Melpomene, freeing up the name Indefatigable for a new battlecruiser. In May 1912, Melpomene was active off the coast of Mexico during the Mexican Revolution, and was reported to be about to land a force of Marines to protect British subjects.

Melpomene was employed in the Training Squadron from 1912 to 1913, and was sold for scrap to the shipbreakers Ward on 7 October 1913, at a price of £15,800.

== Bibliography ==
- Chesneau, Roger; Kolesnik, Eugene M (1979). Conway's All The World's Fighting Ships 1860–1905. London: Conway Maritime Press. ISBN 0-85177-133-5.
- Gardiner, Robert; Gray, Randal (1985). Conway's All The World's Fighting Ships 1906–1921. London: Conway Maritime Press. ISBN 0-85177-245-5.
- Leckie, Halton Stirling (1914). The King's Ships. Vol. III. London: Horace Muirhead.
