= Pearl-class cruiser =

1890 class of British cruisers

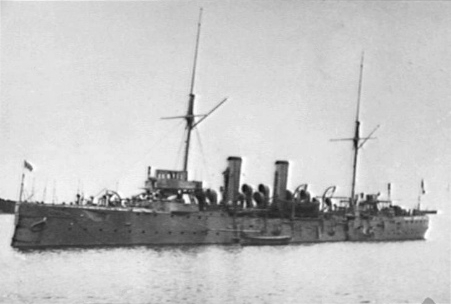
- HMS Tauranga in Tasmania circa. 1902

Class overview
- Name: Pearl
- Operators: Royal Navy; Royal Australian Navy; Royal New Zealand Navy
- Preceded by: Barham class; Marathon class
- Succeeded by: Apollo class
- Built: 1888–1890
- In commission: 1890 - 1947
- Completed: 9
- Retired: 9

General characteristics
- Type: Third-class cruiser
- Displacement: 2,575 tons
- Length: 278 ft (84.7 m) oa; 256 ft (78.0 m) pp
- Beam: 41 ft (12.5 m)
- Draught: 15 ft 6 in (4.72 m)
- Installed power: 7,500 ihp on forced draught
- Propulsion: 2 × 3-cylinder triple-expansion steam engines; 4 × double-ended cylindrical boilers; 2 screws
- Speed: 19 kn (35 km/h; 22 mph)
- Complement: 217
- Armament: 8 × QF 4.7 inch (120 mm) guns; 8 × QF 3-pounder (47 mm) guns; 4 × machine guns; 2 × 14-inch (356 mm) torpedo tubes

The Pearl-class cruiser, also called Pallas-class, was a third-class protected cruiser designed by Sir William White for the Royal Navy. Nine ships were built to this design, five of which were paid for by Australia under the terms of the Imperial Defence Act of 1887 to serve in Australian waters.

== Design ==
Pearl-class ships displaced 2,575 tons and were capable of 19 knots (35.2 km/h).

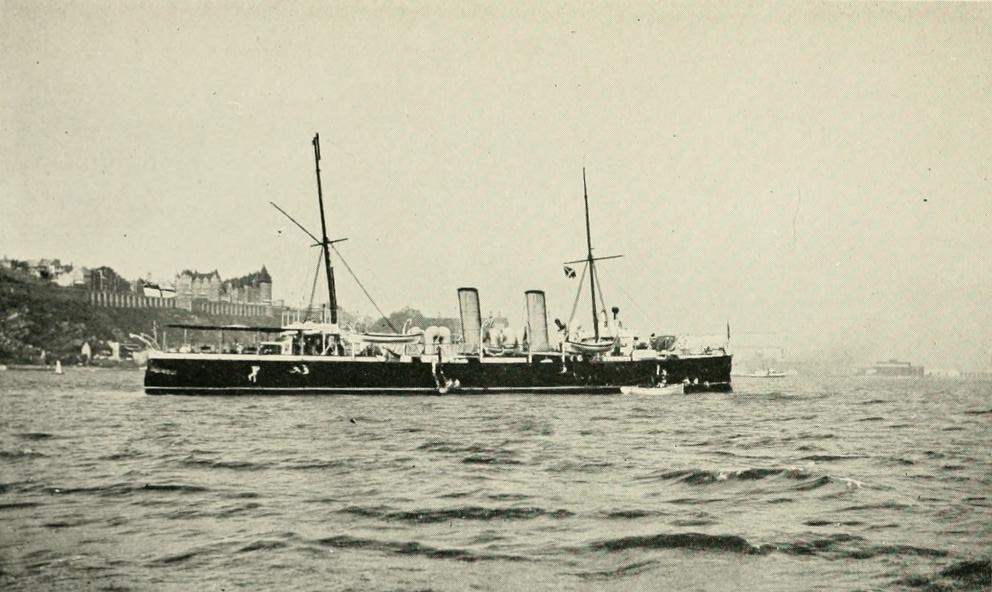
HMS Pallas at Quebec, Quebec in 1901

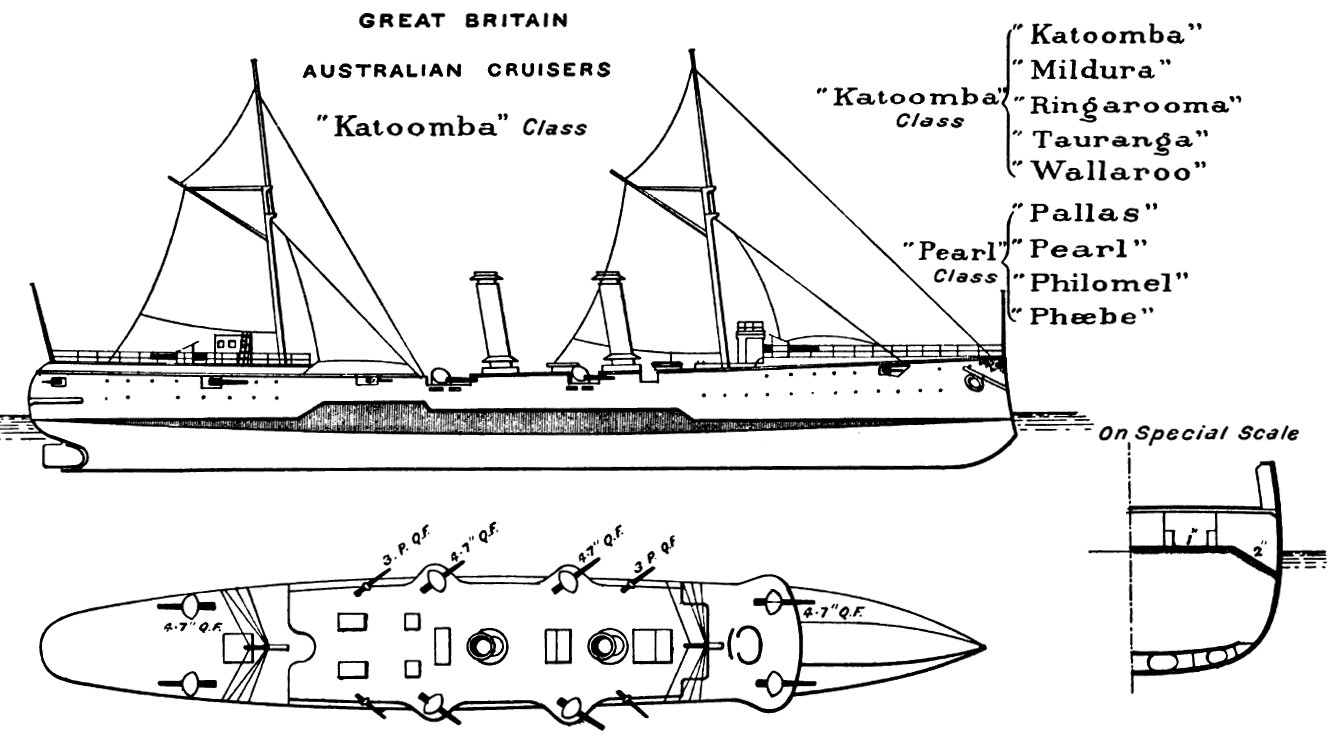
Right elevation, deck plan and hull section as depicted in Brassey's Naval Annual 1897

== Ships ==
Name	Launched	Fate
Pallas	1890	Sold for scrap in 1906.
Pandora	1889	Renamed HMS Katoomba. Sold for scrap in 1906.
Pearl	1890	Sold for scrap in 1906.
Pelorus	1889	Renamed HMS Mildura. Sold for scrap in 1906.
Persian	1890	Renamed HMS Wallaroo and then HMS Wallington. Changed back to original in 1920 before being sold for scrap.
Philomel	1890	Transferred to New Zealand Navy in 1914. Sold on 17 January 1947. Scuttled 6 August 1949.
Phoebe	1890	Sold for scrap in 1906.
Phoenix	1889	Renamed HMS Tauranga. Sold for scrap in 1906.
Psyche	1889	Renamed HMS Ringarooma. Sold for scrap in 1906.

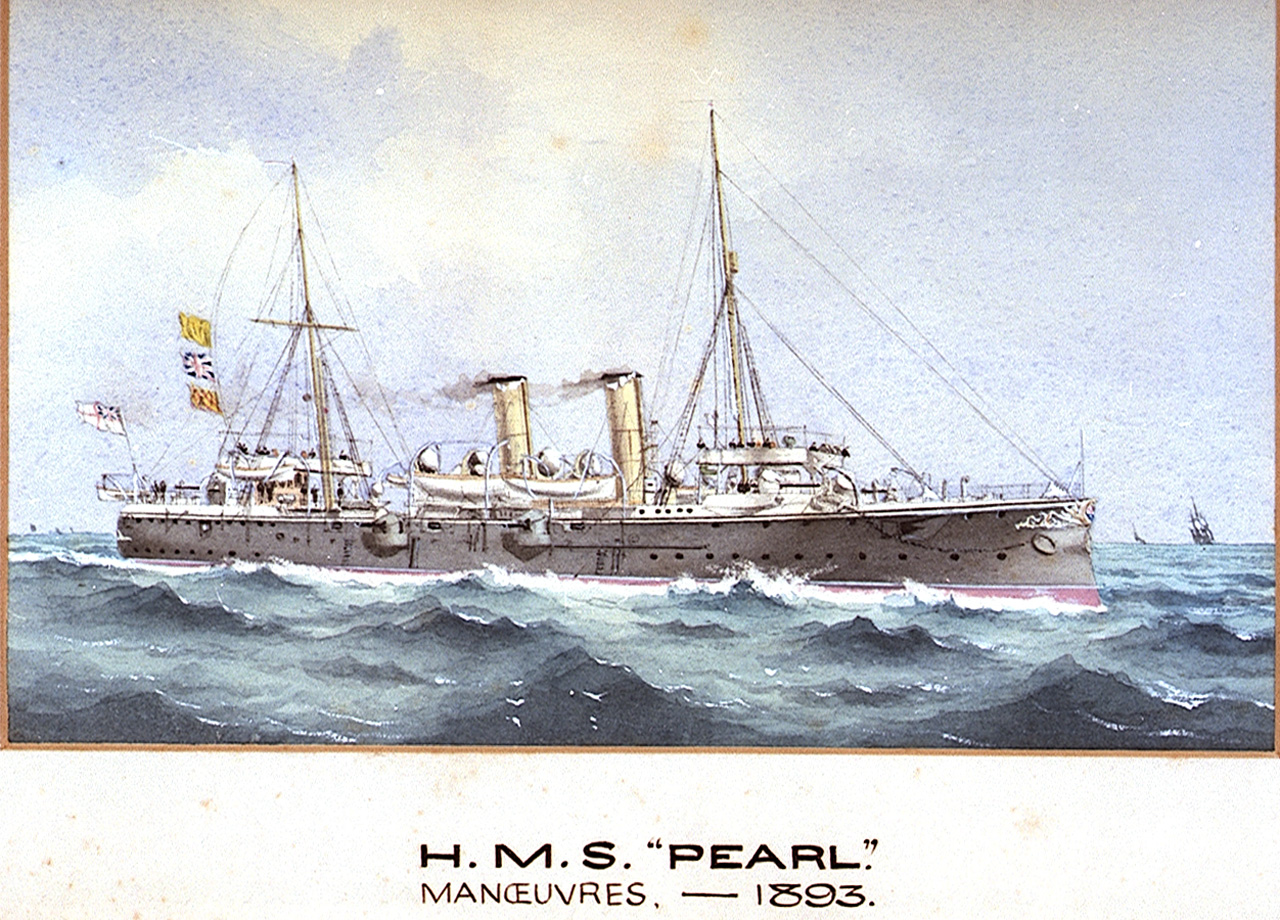
HMS Pearl
