= Melpomene (spider) =

Scientific classification
- Kingdom: Animalia
- Phylum: Arthropoda
- Subphylum: Chelicerata
- Class: Arachnida
- Order: Araneae
- Infraorder: Araneomorphae
- Family: Agelenidae
- Genus: Melpomene; O. Pickard-Cambridge, 1898

Type species
- M. elegans O. Pickard-Cambridge, 1898

Species
- 13, see text

Synonyms
- Ritalena

Genus of spiders

Melpomene is a genus of funnel weavers first described by O. Pickard-Cambridge in 1898. They range from southwestern U.S. (southern Arizona to western Texas) to Panama and can grow up to 7 to 8.5 millimetres (0.28 to 0.33 in) long. Roth and Brame noted that, with many undescribed species, the genus appears to be a catchall or "wastebasket taxon" for several unrelated species that may represent several genera.

== Species ==
As of October 2026 it contains thirteen species:

- Melpomene bicavata (F. O. Pickard-Cambridge, 1902) – Mexico
- Melpomene chamela Maya-Morales & Jiménez, 2017 – Mexico
- Melpomene chiricana Chamberlin & Ivie, 1942 – Panama
- Melpomene coahuilana (Gertsch & Davis, 1940) – Mexico
- Melpomene elegans O. Pickard-Cambridge, 1898 – Mexico
- Melpomene panamana (Petrunkevitch, 1925) – Panama
- Melpomene penetralis (F. O. Pickard-Cambridge, 1902) – Costa Rica
- Melpomene plesia Chamberlin & Ivie, 1942 – Panama
- Melpomene quadrata (Kraus, 1955) – El Salvador
- Melpomene rita (Chamberlin & Ivie, 1941) – USA
- Melpomene singula (Gertsch & Ivie, 1936) – Mexico
- Melpomene solisi Maya-Morales & Jiménez, 2017 – Mexico
- Melpomene transversa (F. O. Pickard-Cambridge, 1902) – Mexico
