= TS Indefatigable =

Training Ship Indefatigable was a British training school opened in 1865 for boys intending to join the Royal Navy or the British Merchant Navy.

== Origins ==
Until the middle of the nineteenth century the British Merchant Navy had no recognized training schools for boys entering the service. Education consisted of boys about 15 years old going to sea "to be led, guided, bullied and socialized into the culture of the sea". There was no distinction between training for AB, and the training of future masters. Through experience it was possible to rise to the position of Master without any formal training. Beginning in the mid- nineteenth century various forms of navigational and seamanship schools were created to remedy the problem

== Liverpool ==
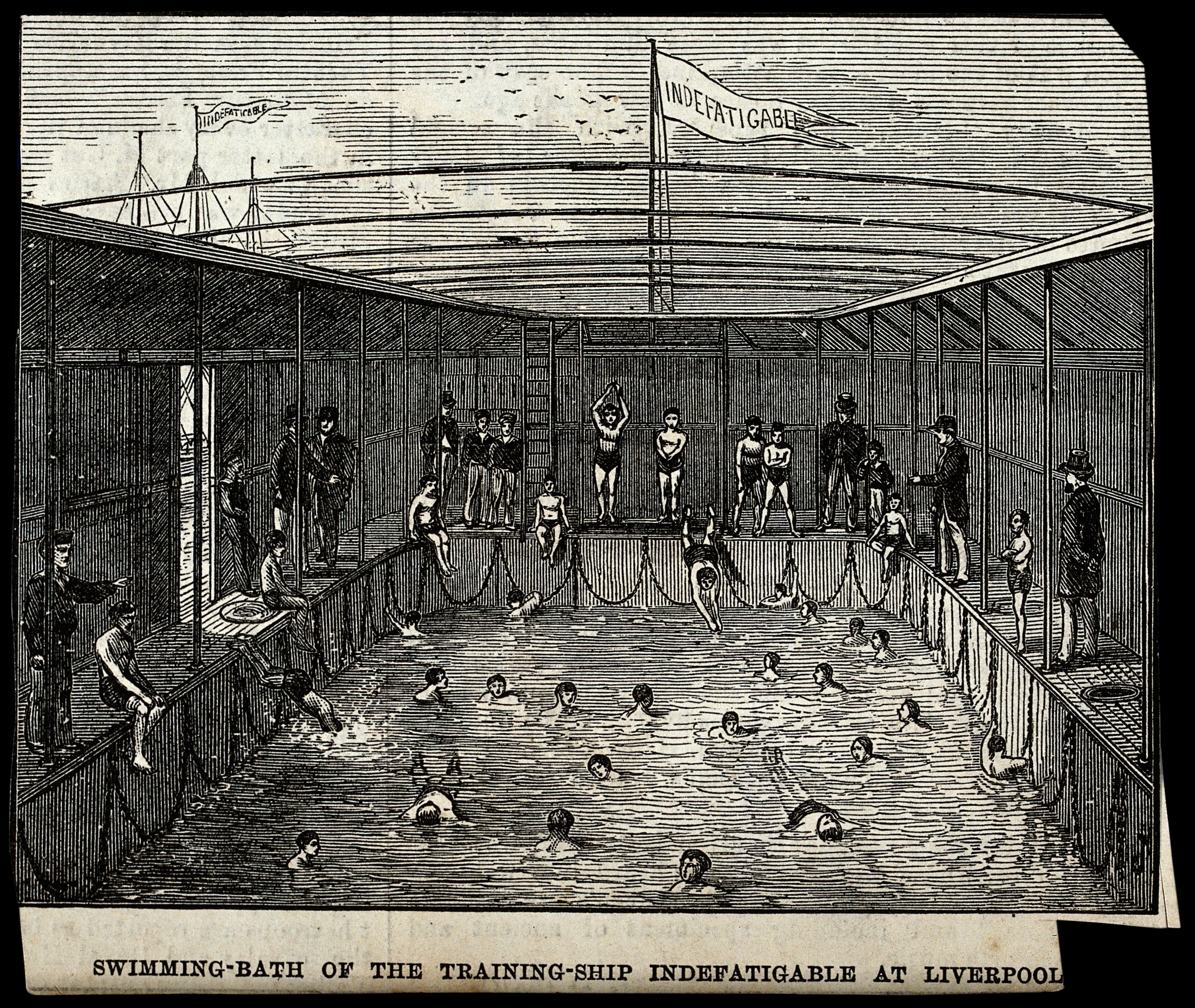
Swimming bath on the training ship "Indefatigable" at Liverpool. Wood engraving.

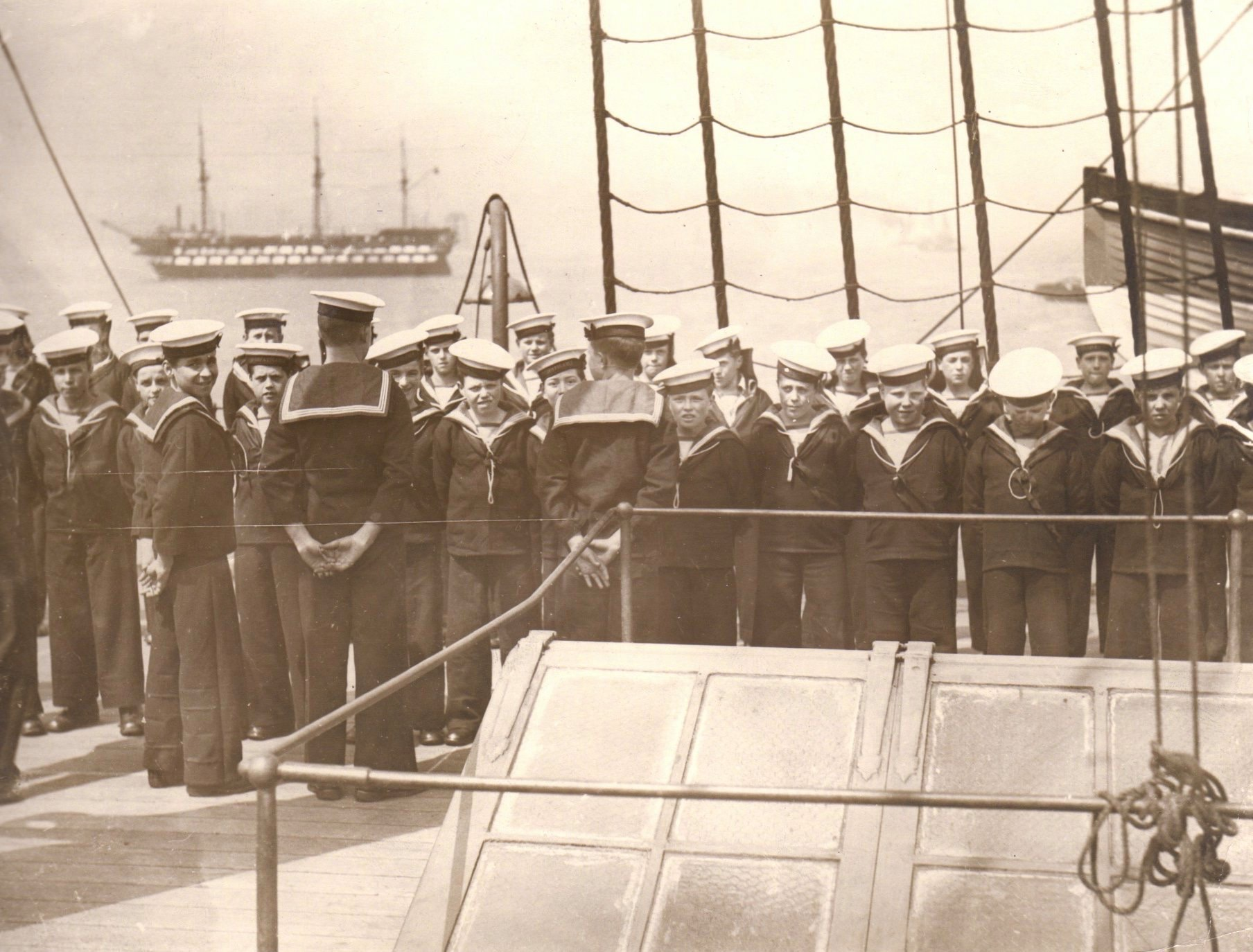
Boys from TS Indefatigable await inspection by Admiral Sir Lewis Clinton Baker in 1927

The TS Indefatigable, ex HMS Indefatigable launched 1848, is towed away to be scrapped in 1914

HMS Phaeton was repurposed in 1914 to become the new TS Indefatigable

Cartoon drawn in 1977 by William Bramhill portraying his fear and loneliness at joining TS Indefatigable in the Mersey at 2pm on October 13 1926

Deck plan of TS Indefatigable (ex HMS Phaeton) drawn from memory by William Frank Bramhill in 1977

Two schools were established in Liverpool, HMS Conway, to prepare boys to go to sea as apprentice officers, and the TS Indefatigable to prepare boys for life at sea as a member of the deck crew.

In 1863 captain John Clint, a Liverpool shipowner, proposed the idea that a sea training school should be established for the orphans and sons of Liverpool seamen. Clint had helped found the Liverpool Shipowners' Association in 1839, the Pilots' Commission, the Dock and Harbour Company, the Liverpool Sailors' Home, the Northern Hospital, but most importantly Clint had been the prime mover in establishing HMS Conway and the Akbar, a reformatory school for boys.

In 1864 the Admiralty agreed to loan HMS Indefatigable, a fifty–gun sailing ship frigate launched in 1848 and retired from active service in 1857, to the Indefatigable committee. Mr. James Bibby contributed £5,000 to convert HMS Indefatigable into a training ship, and this became the beginning of a long relationship between the Bibby family and TS Indefatigable, which continues today with Sir Michael Bibby as President of the Indefatigable Old Boys Association. The Indefatigable was moored at the Sloyne, off Rock Ferry on the River Mersey, alongside HMS Conway and two reformatory ships Akbar and Clarence. The first boys to join the Indefatigable did so on 28 August 1865, with 35 being admitted in the first year. By 1868, 148 boys were on board.

== Replacement ship ==
In 1912 the Inspector of Training Ships condemned the Indefatigable as unfit for use, and so in 1913 the Admiralty agreed to sell HMS Phaeton to the Indefatigable committee for £15,000. Mr. Frank Bibby gave the committee the money to buy the Phaeton and re-fit her as a training ship. The original Indefatigable remained off Rock Ferry until 5 January 1914, and was then towed to the West Float at Birkenhead and sold for scrap on 26 March. By then, the Phaeton had been renamed the Indefatigable and moored off Rock Ferry on 15 January 1914, at which time the old Indefatigable's figurehead of William IV was transferred to the new ship.

== World War II ==
The replacement Indefatigable remained on the Mersey until 1941, when it was decided that the intense German bombing of Liverpool during World War II made it too dangerous to remain anchored on the river Mersey. HMS Conway was towed to Anglesey. However, the decision was made to make the TS Indefatigable a land-based school in the future and the ship was sold for scrap. Later in 1941 the admiralty re-purchased Indefatigable/ex Phaeton, renamed it Carrick II, and used it as a store ship on the River Clyde throughout the rest of World War II. In 1947, after the war, the Indefatigable was finally broken up after 64 years of service.

== Anglesey ==
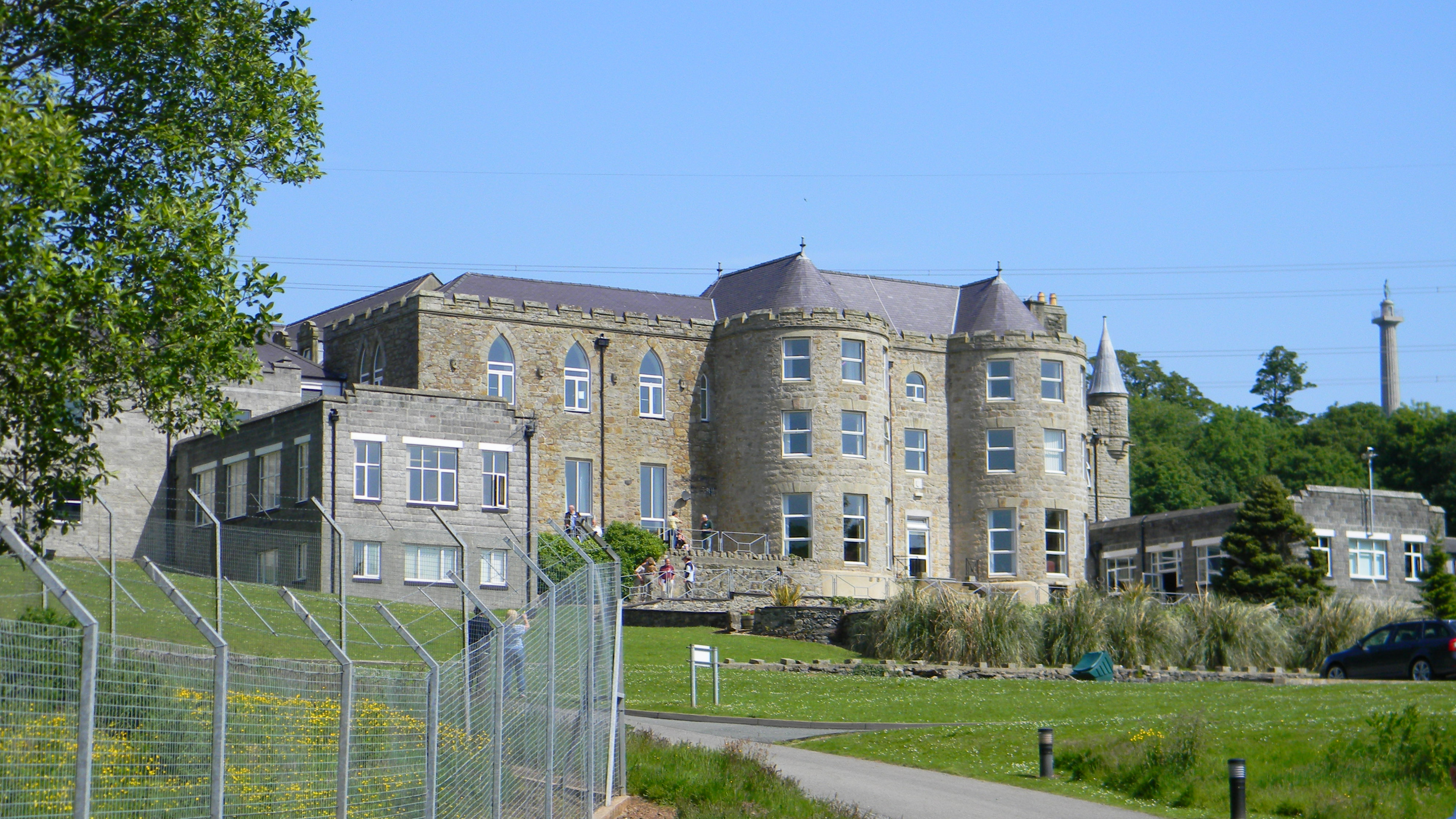
Training School Indefatigable

Temporary accommodation was initially found at a disused holiday camp at Clwydd Newydd, Ruthin, North Wales, before moving to Plas Llanfair in Llanfairpwllgwyngyll on the Menai Strait between Gwynedd and Anglesey in 1944. Plas Llanfair was once home to Admiral Lord Clarence Paget (1811–1895), commander-in-chief of the Mediterranean fleet from 1866 to 1869. Paget was the fourth son of the 1st Marquess of Anglesey (1758–1854), whose column towers above the school. Admiral Paget also had the statue of Lord Nelson erected on the banks of the Menai Strait in 1877 as an aid to navigation.

In 1945 the TS Indefatigable merged with the Lancashire National Sea Training Home for boys and renamed The Indefatigable and National Sea Training School for boys. Although this was the official name the school was always known as the Indefatigable. Boys entered at aged fourteen, graduating at age sixteen to either the Merchant or Royal Navy. The Indefatigable was divided into four divisions; Drake, Raleigh, Rodney and Hood, with approximately thirty boys to each division. The school had three types of students, fee paying, orphans, and council subsidized boys. Up until the mid-1960s, positions were readily available in the British Merchant fleet and Royal Navy for graduating students. However, as the British Merchant Navy declined from a high of 3,112 British registered ships in 1957, to a low of 368 registered ships in 2001, positions at sea for the boys became difficult to find, and the school had to change from a sea-training school to a regular academic public school in an effort to attract more students.

== The End ==
In 1989 new classrooms and sports facilities were built and the age of entry was lowered to the age of 11. However, the numbers continued to fall to around 120 in 1994/5 with an estimated 100 for 1996. The school could not carry on with these numbers, and at the end of term in 1995 the school was closed.

The school was purchased by the Ministry of Defence in 1996 and renamed The Joint Service Mountain Training Centre Indefatigable. A £4 million refurbishment began in July 1998 and the first students arrived in April 1999. The Nuffield Trust partly funded the cost of the refurbishment. In 1983, the Indefatigable Old Boys Association was created and an annual reunion is held at the school each year where the Ministry of Defence gives ex-students access to the old school.

There is a reference in the AGM minutes of 1934 regarding the newly formed Old Boys Association. Mr.A.W. Bibby, Patron, and Mr. Harold Bibby, President.

== Indefatigable Captain Headmasters ==
- Captain John Clint and James J. Bibby – founders
- Captain MacDonald and Mr. George Kendall. Supervised the refit of HMS Indefatigable to the TS Indefatigable
- Captain John Groome appointed the first captain of TS Indefatigable in 1865–1881. In 1881, he lived aboard with wife Helen
- 1881-1920 no record of captains
- Captain Henry Butterworth ?-1927. In 1921, he lived aboard with wife Mary
- Rear Admiral S.R. Miller 1927–1936
- Commander R.A. Jefferies 1936–1939. Called-up for active duty at the beginning of WWII in 1939.
- Captain Cochrane 1939–1940
- Captain W.A. Bamba 1940–1949.
- Captain George Washington Irvine 1949–1966.
- Captain Wade 1966–1977.
- Captain R.T. Youngman 1977–1986.
- Captain Terrence Beggs 1986–1989
- Mr Peter D White 1989–1995.
