= HMS Katoomba =

Pearl-class cruiser

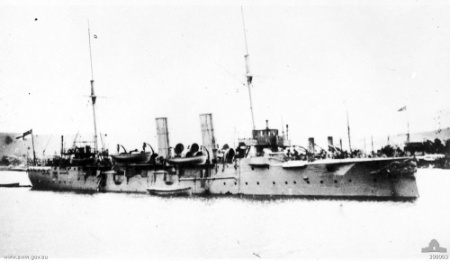
- HMS Katoomba in Hobart, Tasmania in 1903.

History

United Kingdom
- Name: Pandora
- Namesake: Pandora; Katoomba, New South Wales
- Builder: Armstrong Whitworth, Elswick, Tyne and Wear
- Laid down: 15 August 1888
- Launched: 27 August 1889
- Completed: 1 December 1890
- Renamed: Katoomba
- Fate: Sold for scrap, 10 July 1906

General characteristics
- Class & type: Pearl-class cruiser
- Displacement: 2,575 tons
- Length: 278 ft (84.7 m) (oa); 265 ft (80.8 m) (pp)
- Beam: 41 ft (12 m)
- Draught: 15 ft 6 in (4.7 m)
- Installed power: 7,500 shp (5,600 kW); 4 × boilers
- Propulsion: 2 × screws; 2 × 3-cylinder triple-expansion steam engines
- Speed: 19 knots (35 km/h; 22 mph)
- Complement: 210
- Armament: 8 × QF 4.7 inch (120 mm) guns; 8 × 3-pounder guns; 4 × 14-inch (356 mm) torpedo tubes
- Armour: Deck: 1–2 inches (25–51 mm); Gun shields: 2 in; Conning tower: 3 inches (76 mm)

HMS Katoomba was a Pearl-class cruiser built for the Royal Navy, originally named HMS Pandora, built by Armstrong Whitworth, Elswick, Tyne and Wear and launched on 27 August 1889. Renamed on 2 April 1890, as Katoomba as the flagship of the Auxiliary Squadron of the Australia Station. She arrived in Sydney with the squadron on 5 September 1891. She was damaged in a collision with the tug Yatala in Port Adelaide on 29 December 1891. She left the Australia Station on 16 January 1906. She was sold for £8500 on 10 July 1906 and broken up at Morecambe.

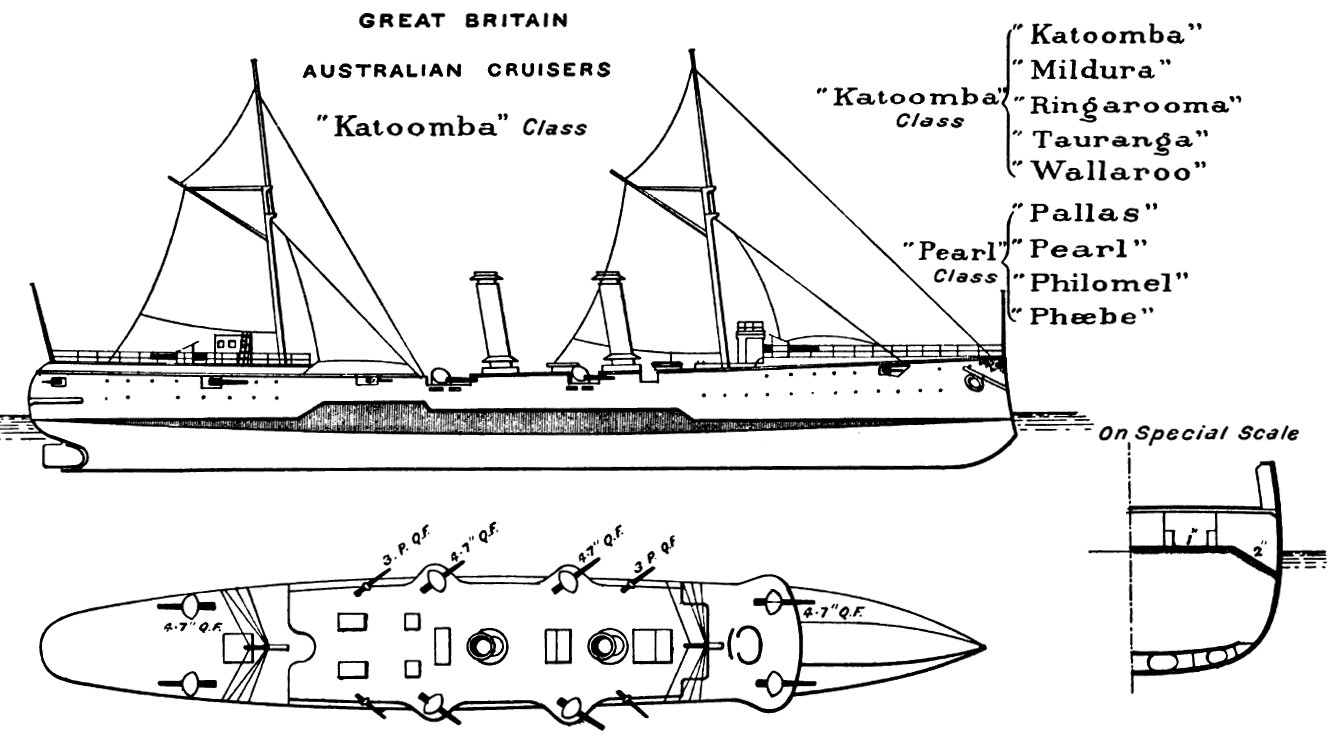
A Pearl-class cruiser from Brassey's Naval Annual, 1897
