= Naval Defence Act 1889 =

Act of the Parliament of the United Kingdom

Naval Defence Act 1889 (Note: Section 9.)
- Act of Parliament
- Parliament of the United Kingdom
- Long title: An Act to make further provision for Naval Defence and defray the Expenses thereof.
- Citation: 52 & 53 Vict. c. 8
- Territorial extent: United Kingdom

Dates
- Royal assent: 31 May 1889
- Commencement: 31 May 1889 (Note: The Acts of Parliament (Commencement) Act 1793.)
- Repealed: 31 July 1894
Other legislation
Repealed by	Finance Act 1894

Status: Repealed

Text of statute as originally enacted

The Naval Defence Act 1889 (52 & 53 Vict. c. 8) was an act of the Parliament of the United Kingdom. It received royal assent on 31 May 1889 and formally adopted the "two-power standard" and increased the United Kingdom's naval strength. The standard called for the Royal Navy to maintain a number of battleships at least equal to the combined strength of the next two largest navies in the world, which then were France and Russia. An extra £20 million over the following four years were provided for ten new battleships, thirty-eight new cruisers, eighteen new torpedo boats and four new fast gunboats. The two-power standard was maintained until disarmament began during the interwar period.

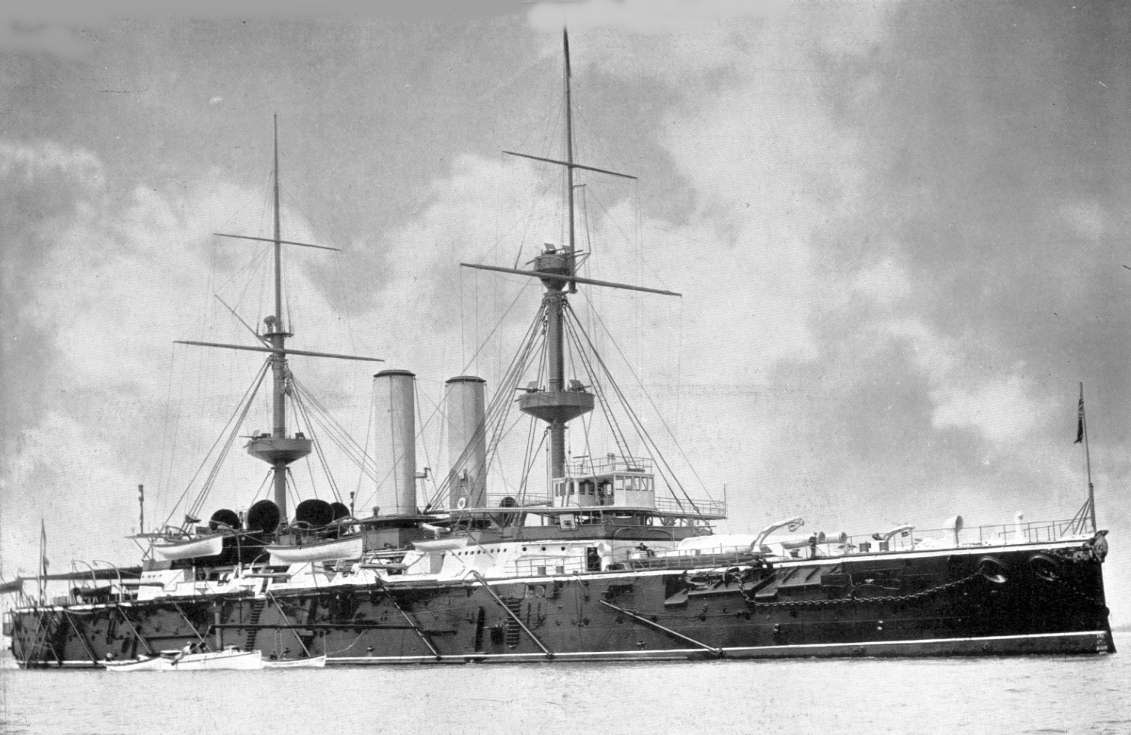
The battleship HMS Royal Sovereign

== Background ==
It was passed under the government of Lord Salisbury and facilitated spending £21,500,000 (equivalent to £2.389×10^{9} in 2025) over five years toward fleet expansion. Initially, Parliament opposed the increase in naval expenditures for several reasons.

Expert naval opinions presented to Parliament in December 1888 and February 1889 rendered critical views on the state of the navy. The buildup of the French and Russian navies was another factor pointing to purported British weakness. As a result, public support for proposed naval growth grew and placed further pressure on Parliament to support the act.

In reality, the two-power standard had been informally used over the past seventy years and during the 1850s, Britain had briefly met it. Britain already enjoyed international naval superiority. The Act reasserted the standard by its formal adoption and signalled an ambition to improve British naval supremacy to an even higher level.

== Naval expansion ==
The expansion came in the form of ten battleships, forty-two cruisers and eighteen torpedo gunboats. The battleships were the centrepiece of the legislation. Eight first-class battleships – seven of the Royal Sovereign class along with a half-sister, HMS Hood – and two second-class battleships, HMS Centurion and HMS Barfleur were ordered. The Royal Sovereign class was the most formidable capital ship of its day, fulfilling the role of a larger and faster battleship unmatched by those of Russia and France. The cruisers were aimed at protecting British supply lines.

Nine first-class cruisers of the Edgar class, twenty-nine second-class cruisers of the Apollo and Astraea classes and four third-class cruisers of the Pearl class were provided. The other eighteen torpedo gunboats served to support and protect the main battle fleet.

== Rationale ==
The primary rationales were military and economic. The First Lord of the Admiralty, Lord George Hamilton, argued that the size and scope of the new building programme would deter the naval ambitions of other powers. By deterring other powers’ naval growth at present, the British would be able to spend less on shipbuilding in the future.

The large and quickly-generated funds voted by Parliament and guaranteed over a five-year period offered immediate economic incentives as well. Previous shipbuilding efforts had been halted due to an insufficient annual allowance. Without the funds to complete the warships, production took longer and cost more. By financing the expansion over a five-year period, residual balances from one year could be transferred over to the next, allowing production to continue uninterrupted, at greatly reduced costs. That also aimed for the British completion of her warships more quickly than its rival powers. In theory, the scope and the speed of production would not only cut costs but also deter other powers from hoping to match British production.

== Aftermath ==
In practice, there was a limited economic success but failed as a deterrent. The financing of the warships over five years allowed production to continue uninterrupted with low cost overruns and limited delays. A coinciding demand for merchant vessels, built in the same private shipyards as some of the warships, led to minimal increases in the cost of labour and material. Lord George Hamilton's hopes of reducing future naval expenditures however, were dashed as the increased British production was soon matched by France and Russia. While Britain had completed 10 battleships and had another 3 either under construction or projected, the French and Russians had begun the construction of a combined 12 battleships, with another 3 projected. Another British expansion, known as the Spencer Programme, followed in 1894 aimed to match foreign naval growth at a cost of over £31 million. Instead of deterring the naval expansion of foreign powers, the act probably contributed to a naval arms race. Other powers including Germany and the United States bolstered their navies in the following years as Britain continued to increase its own naval expenditures.

The whole act was repealed by section 41(5) of, and the third schedule to, the Finance Act 1894 (57 & 58 Vict. c. 30), which came into force on 31 July 1894.

== See also ==
- History of the Royal Navy

== Bibliography ==
- Lambert, Nicholas A. Sir John Fisher's Naval Revolution, (Columbia: University of South Carolina Press, 2002), 3-4, 29-30.
- Marder, Arthur. The anatomy of British sea power : a history of British naval policy in the pre-dreadnought era, 1880-1905 (1976) ch 8
- Parkinson, Roger. The Late Victorian Navy: the Pre-Dreadnought Era and the Origins of the First World War, (Suffolk: Boydell Press, 2008)
  - James Levy, review of The Late Victorian Navy, by Roger Parkinson, Journal of Military History, January 2008, 293-294.
