= Marathon-class cruiser =

British naval ship class (1889–1920)

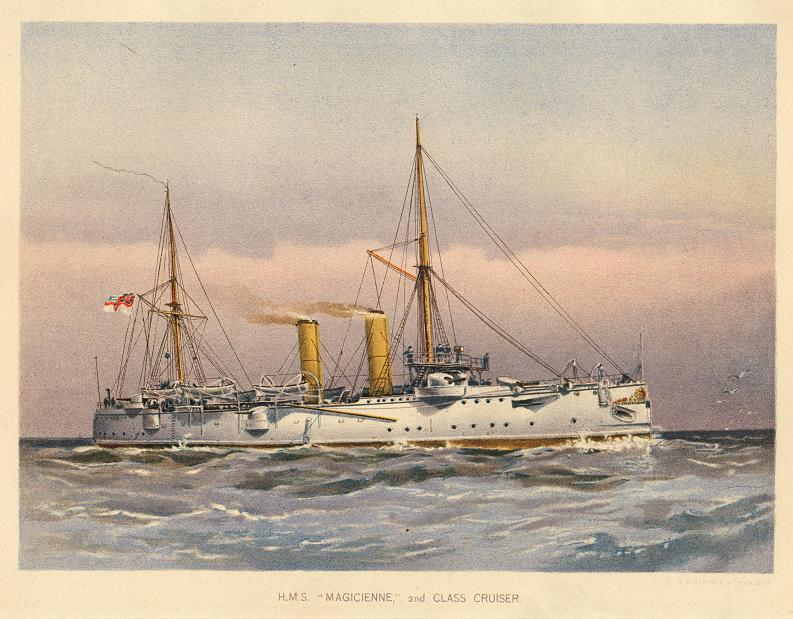
- Chromolithograph of HMS Magicienne by W. Fred Mitchell, 1892Chromolithograph of HMS Magicienne by W. Fred Mitchell, 1892

Class overview
- Name: Marathon class
- Builders: Fairfields, Govan; Portsmouth Naval Dockyard; Chatham Naval Dockyard
- Operators: Royal Navy
- Preceded by: Mersey class
- Succeeded by: Pearl class
- Built: 1887–1889
- In commission: 1889–1920
- Completed: 5
- Retired: 5

General characteristics
- Type: 2nd class cruiser
- Displacement: 2,800 long tons (2,845 t) (Medea & Medusa); 2,950 long tons (2,997 t) (Melpomene, Magicienne & Marathon)
- Propulsion: Dürr boilers (Medusa)
- Speed: 20 knots (37 km/h; 23 mph)
- Complement: 218
- Armament: 6 × 6 in (152.4 mm) guns; 9 × 6-pounder quick firing guns; 1 × 3-pounder gun; 3 × machine guns; 2 × torpedo tubes

The Marathon-class cruiser was a class of second class cruiser of the Royal Navy ordered under the naval programme of 1887. The class was a smaller version of the Mersey class.

Three of the ships, Melpomene, Magicienne and Marathon, were built for foreign (tropical) service, with a sheath of wood and copper - this added weight and made them slightly slower.

== Ships ==
Name	Builder	Laid down	Launched	Completed
HMS Marathon	Fairfields, Govan	10 August 1887	23 August 1888	1889
HMS Magicienne	Fairfields, Govan	10 August 1887	12 May 1888	1889
HMS Medea	Chatham	25 April 1887	9 June 1888	1889
HMS Melpomene	Portsmouth	10 October 1887	20 September 1888	1890
HMS Medusa	Chatham	25 August 1887	11 August 1888	1889

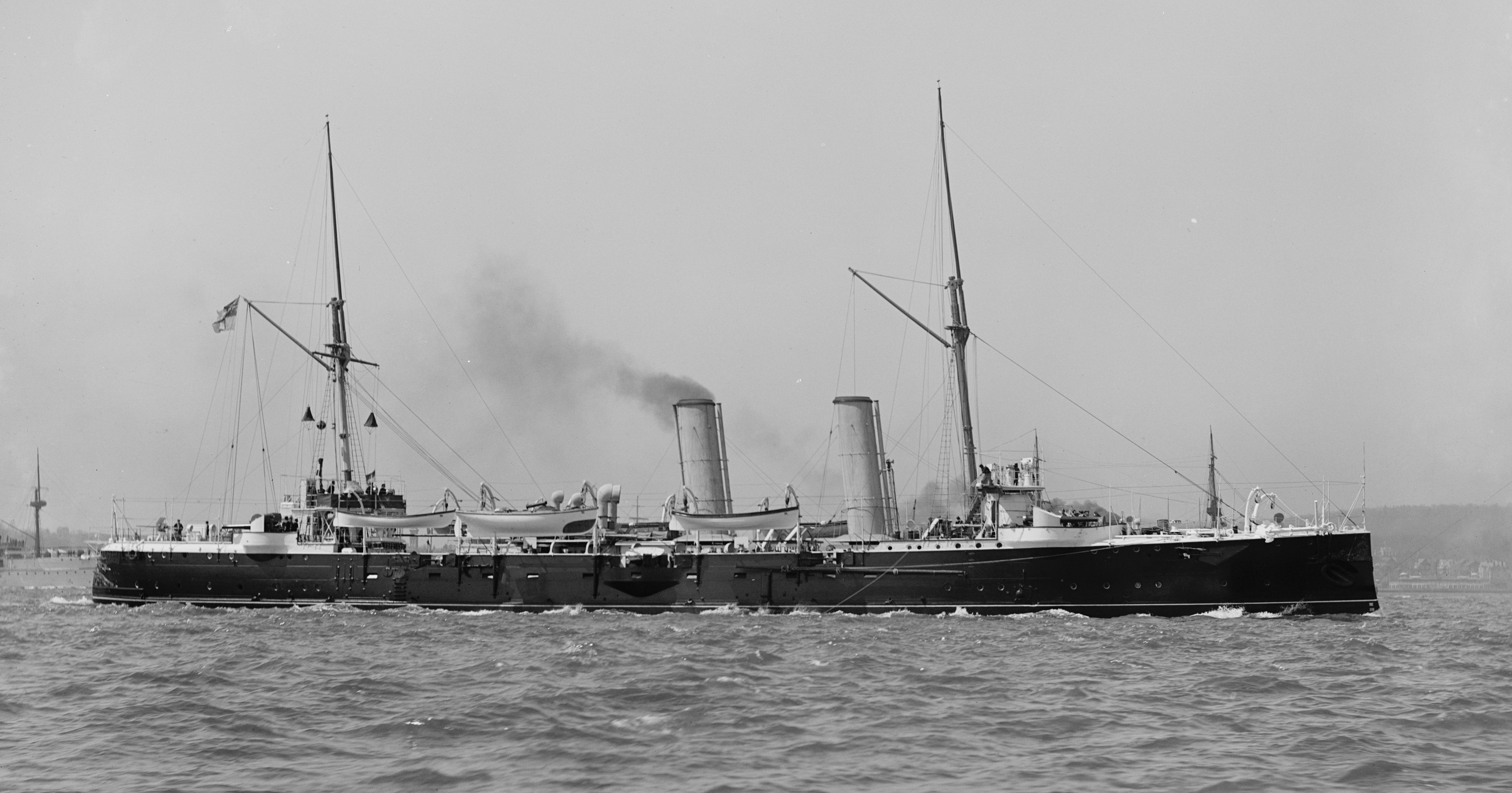
HMS Magicienne (picture taken between 1890 and 1899).

== Boiler trials ==
By 1901, the Royal Navy had ordered eight Dürr boilers from Germany, to be installed as a trial on board Medusa as a substitute for the Belleville boilers then in naval use.
