= List of Crimean War Victoria Cross recipients =

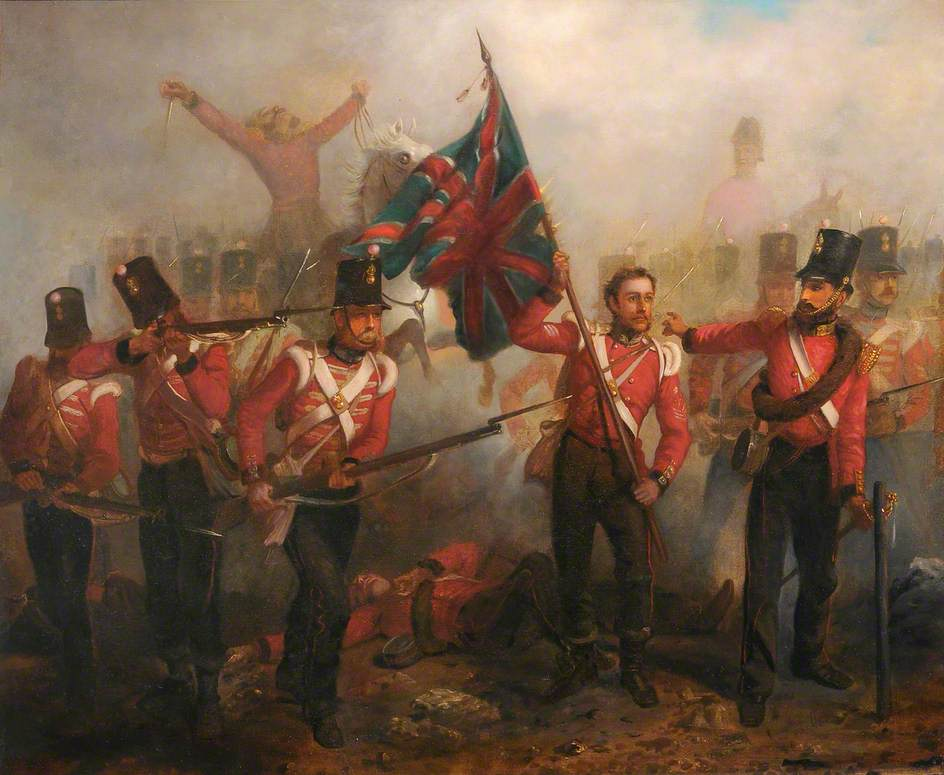
Sergeant Luke O'Connor Winning the Victoria Cross at the Battle of Alma (1854). Oil by Louis William Desanges.

The Victoria Cross (VC) was awarded to 111 members of the British Armed Forces during the Crimean War (also known as the Russian War) that lasted from 1854 to 1856. The Victoria Cross is a military decoration awarded for valour "in the face of the enemy" to members of armed forces of some Commonwealth countries and previous British Empire territories. The VC was introduced in Great Britain on 29 January 1856 by Queen Victoria to reward acts of valour during the Crimean War. It takes precedence over all other Orders, decorations and medals; it may be awarded to a person of any rank in any service and to civilians under military command. The first ceremony was held on 26 June 1857 where Queen Victoria invested 62 of the 111 Crimean recipients in Hyde Park.

In 1854, the Crimean War broke out between the Russian Empire and an alliance of France, Great Britain, the Kingdom of Sardinia and the Ottoman Empire. One of the first battles of the War was the Battle of the Alma where allied forces convincingly defeated the Russian forces. The siege of Sevastapol followed shortly after in September 1854; it was to last for a year at the cost of over 128,000 lives, three-quarters of which died from disease. After the siege at Sevastapol, the fighting mainly ceased and on 30 March 1856, after two years of action, the Russians negotiated a Peace Treaty at the Congress of Paris. The Treaty set the Black Sea as neutral territory, closing it to all warships, and prohibiting fortifications and the presence of armaments on its shores. The Crimean War led to a number of large-scale changes in the British Army. The sale of commissions came under great scrutiny during the war, especially in connection with the Battle of Balaclava, which saw the ill-fated Charge of the Light Brigade. This scrutiny eventually led to the abolition of the sale of commissions.

The dispatches of William Howard Russell during the war highlighted how many acts of bravery and valour by British servicemen went unrewarded. There was a growing feeling amongst the public and in the Royal Court that a new award was needed to recognise incidents of gallantry that were unconnected with a man's lengthy or meritorious service. Queen Victoria issued a warrant under the Royal sign-manual on 29 January 1856 (gazetted 5 February 1856) that officially constituted the VC. The order was backdated to 1854 to recognise acts of valour during the Crimean War. The first awards ceremony was held on 26 June 1857 where Queen Victoria invested 62 of the 111 Crimean recipients in a ceremony in Hyde Park.

Citations for the Crimean War, particularly those in the first gazette of 24 February 1857, listed multiple actions for about a third of the recipients. The format of each citation varied between recipients, some specify the actual date, some the name of the battle and others have both sets of information.

Until 1907, it was policy not to award the VC posthumously. Between 1857 and 1901, nine notices were published in the London Gazette for soldiers who would have been awarded the VC had they survived. In a partial reversal of policy in 1902, medals were sent to the next of kin of the three mentioned for the Boer War and at the same time the first three official posthumous awards, again for the Boer War, were gazetted. In 1907, the posthumous policy was completely reversed and medals were sent to the next of kin of the remaining six officers and men. As a result of the change of policy, one quarter of all awards for the First World War were posthumous but it was only in the general revision of the warrant issued in 1920 that a clause was inserted to explicitly allow posthumous awards.

== Recipients ==
Name	Unit	Date of action	Place of action
Alfred Ablett	Grenadier Guards	2 September 1855	Sevastopol, Crimea
John Alexander	90th Regiment of Foot	18 June 1855	Sevastopol, Crimea
Thomas Arthur	Royal Regiment of Artillery	7 June 1855	Sevastopol, Crimea
Thomas Beach	55th Regiment of Foot	5 November 1854	Inkerman, Crimea
Edward Bell	Royal Welch Fusiliers	20 September 1854	Alma, Crimea
John Berryman	17th Lancers	25 October 1854	Balaclava, Crimea
Claud Bourchier	Rifle Brigade (Prince Consort's Own)	20 November 1854	Sevastopol, Crimea
Joseph Bradshaw	Rifle Brigade (Prince Consort's Own)	22 April 1855	Woronzoff Road, Crimea
Cecil Buckley	HMS Miranda	29 May 1855	Sea of Azov, Crimea
Hugh Burgoyne	HMS Swallow	29 May 1855	Sea of Azov, Crimea
John Byrne	68th Regiment of Foot	5 November 1854	Inkerman, Crimea
John Bythesea	HMS Arrogant	9 August 1854	Åland, Finland
Daniel Cambridge	Royal Regiment of Artillery	8 September 1855	Sevastopol, Crimea
Henry Clifford	Rifle Brigade (Prince Consort's Own)	5 November 1854	Inkerman, Crimea
William Coffey	34th Regiment of Foot	29 March 1855	Sevastopol, Crimea
John Coleman	97th Regiment of Foot	30 August 1855	Sevastopol, Crimea
John Commerell	HMS Weser	11 October 1855	Sea of Azov, Crimea
John Connors	3rd Regiment of Foot	8 September 1855	Sevastopol, Crimea
John Conolly	49th Regiment of Foot	26 October 1854	Sevastopol, Crimea
Henry Cooper	HMS Miranda	3 June 1855	Taganrog, Crimea
James Craig	Scots Fusiliers Guards	6 September 1855	Sevastopol, Crimea
William Cuninghame	Rifle Brigade (Prince Consort's Own)	20 November 1854	Sevastopol, Crimea
Henry Curtis	Naval Brigade	18 June 1855	Sevastopol, Crimea
Edward Daniel	HMS Diamond	18 October 1854	Sevastopol, Crimea
Gronow Davis	Royal Regiment of Artillery	8 September 1855	Sevastopol, Crimea
George Day	HMS Recruit	17 September 1855	Genitichi, Crimea
Collingwood Dickson	Royal Regiment of Artillery	17 October 1854	Sevastopol, Crimea
Matthew Dixon	Royal Regiment of Artillery	17 April 1855	Sevastopol, Crimea
George Dowell	Royal Marine Artillery	13 July 1855	Fort of Viborg, Finland
Alexander Dunn	11th Hussars	25 October 1854	Balaclava, Crimea
Howard Elphinstone	Corps of Royal Engineers	18 June 1855	Sevastopol, Crimea
Frederick Elton	55th Regiment of Foot	29 March 1855	Sevastopol, Crimea
Thomas Esmonde	18th Regiment of Foot	18 June 1855	Sevastopol, Crimea
Samuel Evans	19th Regiment of Foot	13 April 1855	Sevastopol, Crimea
John Farrell	17th Lancers	25 October 1854	Balaclava, Crimea
George Gardiner	57th Regiment of Foot	22 March 1855	Sevastopol, Crimea
Gerald Goodlake	Coldstream Guards	28 October 1854	Inkerman, Crimea
James Gorman	Naval Brigade	5 November 1854	Inkerman, Crimea
Thomas Grady	4th Regiment of Foot	18 October 1854	Sevastopol, Crimea
Gerald Graham	Corps of Royal Engineers	18 June 1855	Sevastopol, Crimea
John Grieve	Royal Scots Greys	25 October 1854	Balaclava, Crimea
Thomas Hale	7th Regiment of Foot	8 September 1855	Sevastopol, Crimea
Thomas Hamilton	68th Regiment of Foot	11 May 1855	Sevastopol, Crimea
Andrew Henry	Royal Regiment of Artillery	5 November 1854	Inkerman, Crimea
William Hewett	HMS Beagle	26 October 1854	Sevastopol, Crimea
William Hope	7th Regiment of Foot	18 June 1855	Sevastopol, Crimea
Mathew Hughes	7th Regiment of Foot	7 June 1855; 18 June 1855	Sevastopol, Crimea
Robert Humpston	Rifle Brigade (Prince Consort's Own)	22 April 1855	Woronzoff Road, Crimea
George Ingouville	HMS Arrogant	13 July 1855	Fort of Viborg, Finland
William Johnstone	HMS Arrogant	9 August 1854	Åland Islands, Finland
Henry Jones	7th Regiment of Foot	7 June 1855	Sevastopol, Crimea
Joseph Kellaway	HMS Wrangler	31 August 1855	Sea of Azov, Crimea
John Knox	Scots Fusiliers Guards	20 September 1854	Alma, Crimea
Peter Leitch	Corps of Royal Engineers	18 June 1855	Sevastopol, Crimea
William Lendrim	Corps of Royal Engineers	14 February 1855	Sevastopol, Crimea
Wilbraham Lennox	Corps of Royal Engineers	20 November 1854	Sevastopol, Crimea
Robert Lindsay	Scots Fusiliers Guards	20 September 1854	Alma, Crimea; Inkerman, Crimea
Charles Lucas	HMS Hecla	21 June 1854	Åland Islands, Finland
Charles Lumley	97th Regiment of Foot	8 September 1855	Sevastopol, Crimea
John Lyons	19th Regiment of Foot	10 June 1855	Sevastopol, Crimea
Henry MacDonald	Corps of Royal Engineers	19 April 1855	Sevastopol, Crimea
Ambrose Madden	41st Regiment of Foot	26 October 1854	Inkerman, Crimea
Joseph Malone	13th Light Dragoons	25 October 1854	Balaclava, Crimea
Frederick Maude	3rd Regiment of Foot	5 September 1855	Sevastopol, Crimea
Charles McCorrie	57th Regiment of Foot	23 June 1855	Sevastopol, Crimea
John McDermond	47th Regiment of Foot	5 November 1854	Inkerman, Crimea
Roderick McGregor	Rifle Brigade (Prince Consort's Own)	July 1855	Sevastopol, Crimea
James McKechnie	Scots Fusilier Guards	20 September 1854	Alma, Crimea
William McWheeney	44th Regiment of Foot	20 October 1854	Sevastopol, Crimea
Frederick Miller	Royal Regiment of Artillery	5 November 1854	Inkerman, Crimea
James Mouat	6th Dragoons	26 October 1854	Balaclava, Crimea
Andrew Moynihan	90th Regiment of Foot	8 September 1855	Sevastopol, Crimea
William Norman	7th Regiment of Foot	19 December 1854	Sevastopol, Crimea
Luke O'Connor	Royal Welch Fusiliers	20 September 1854	Alma, Crimea
James Owens	49th Regiment of Foot	30 October 1854	Sevastopol, Crimea
Anthony Palmer	Grenadier Guards	5 November 1854	Inkerman, Crimea
John Park	77th Regiment of Foot	19 April 1855	Alma, Crimea; Inkerman, Crimea
Samuel Parkes	4th Light Dragoons	25 October 1854	Balaclava, Crimea
William Peel	Naval Brigade	18 October 1854; 5 November 1854; 18 June 1855	Sevastopol, Crimea
Henry Percy	Grenadier Guards	5 November 1854	Inkerman, Crimea
John Perie	Corps of Royal Engineers	18 June 1855	Sevastopol, Crimea
John Prettyjohns	Royal Marine Light Infantry	5 November 1854	Inkerman, Crimea
Joseph Prosser	1st Regiment of Foot	16 June 1855	Sevastopol, Crimea
Henry Raby	Naval Brigade	18 June 1855	Sevastopol, Crimea
Henry Ramage	2nd Dragoons	25 October 1854	Balaclava, Crimea
Thomas Reeves	Naval Brigade	5 November 1854	Inkerman, Crimea
William Reynolds	Scots Fusiliers Guards	20 September 1854	Alma, Crimea
William Rickard	HMS Weser	11 October 1855	Sea of Azov, Crimea
John Robarts	HMS Ardent	29 May 1855	Sea of Azov, Crimea
John Ross	Corps of Royal Engineers	21 July 1855	Sevastopol, Crimea
Hugh Rowlands	41st Regiment of Foot	5 November 1854	Inkerman, Crimea
Charles Russell	Grenadier Guards	5 November 1854	Inkerman, Crimea
Mark Scholefield	Naval Brigade	5 November 1854	Inkerman, Crimea
John Sheppard	Naval Brigade	15 July 1855	Sevastopol, Crimea
Robert Shields	Royal Welch Fusiliers	8 September 1855	Sevastopol, Crimea
John Sims	34th Regiment of Foot	18 June 1855	Sevastopol, Crimea
Philip Smith	17th Regiment of Foot	18 June 1855	Sevastopol, Crimea
William Stanlake	Coldstream Guards	26 October 1854	Inkerman, Crimea
George Strong	Coldstream Guards	September 1855	Sevastopol, Crimea
John Sullivan	Naval Brigade	10 April 1855	Sevastopol, Crimea
William Sylvester	Royal Welch Fusiliers	8 September 1855	Sevastopol, Crimea
George Symons	Royal Regiment of Artillery	6 June 1855	Inkerman, Crimea
John Taylor	Naval Brigade	18 June 1855	Sevastopol, Crimea
Christopher Teesdale	Royal Regiment of Artillery	29 September 1855	Kars, Turkey
Joseph Trewavas	HMS Beagle	3 July 1855	Sea of Azov, Crimea
Mark Walker	30th Regiment of Foot	5 November 1854	Inkerman, Crimea
George Walters	49th Regiment of Foot	5 November 1854	Inkerman, Crimea
Francis Wheatley	Rifle Brigade (Prince Consort's Own)	12 October 1854	Sevastopol, Crimea
Thomas Wilkinson	Royal Marine Artillery	7 June 1855	Sevastopol, Crimea
Charles Wooden	17th Lancers	26 October 1854	Balaclava, Crimea
Alexander Wright	77th Regiment of Foot	22 March 1855; 19 April 1855	Sevastopol, Crimea
