= List of Victoria Cross recipients of the Royal Navy =

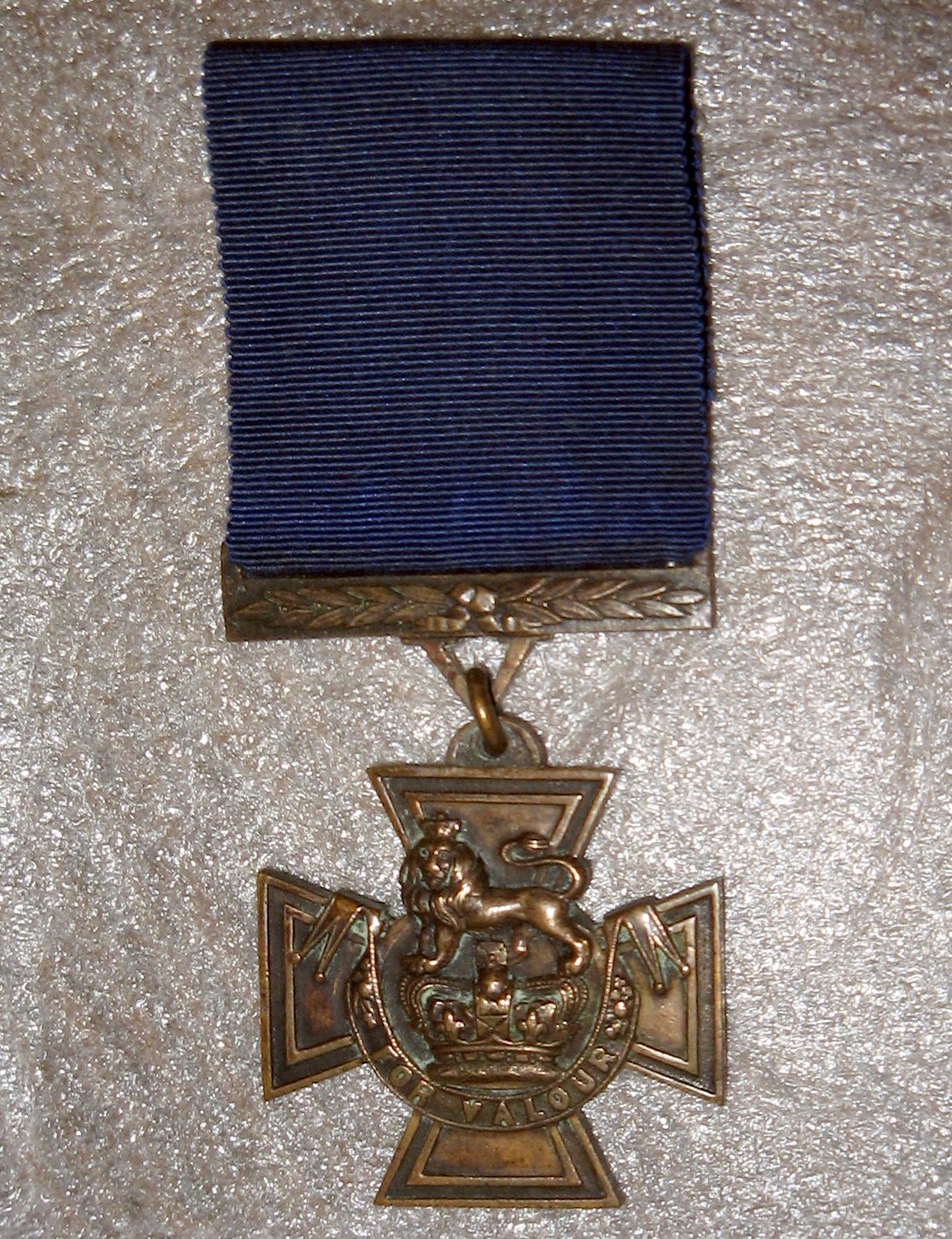
The Victoria Cross in its pre-1918 Naval form, with a blue ribbon

The Victoria Cross (VC) is a naval and military decoration awarded for valour "in the face of the enemy" to members of armed forces of some Commonwealth countries and previous British Empire territories. It takes precedence over all other postnominals and medals. It may be awarded to a person of any rank in any service and civilians under military command, and is presented to the recipient by the British monarch during an investiture held at Buckingham Palace. It is the joint highest award for bravery in the United Kingdom with the George Cross, which is the equivalent honour for valour not "in the face of the enemy." The VC has been awarded on 1356 occasions to 1353 individual recipients.

The VC was introduced on 29 January 1856 by Queen Victoria to reward acts of valour during the Crimean War. The traditional explanation of the source of the gunmetal from which the medals are struck is that it derives from Russian cannon captured at the siege of Sevastopol. Recent research has thrown doubt on this story, suggesting a variety of origins. The original Royal Warrant did not contain a specific clause regarding posthumous awards, although official policy was to not award the VC posthumously. Between 1897 and 1901, several notices were issued in the London Gazette regarding soldiers who would have been awarded the VC had they survived. In a partial reversal of policy in 1902, six of the soldiers mentioned were granted the VC, but not "officially" awarded the medal. In 1907, the posthumous policy was completely reversed and medals were sent to the next of kin of the six officers and men. The Victoria Cross warrant was not officially amended to explicitly allow posthumous awards until 1920 but one quarter of all awards for the First World War were posthumous.

Within this list, the date of action listed is the year in which the action took place for which the VC was awarded. The most naval Victoria Crosses awarded in a single conflict were for the First World War, followed by the Second World War and then the Crimean War. There have been a total of 117 recipients of the Victoria Cross who served with the Royal Navy. Sixty-eight awards were to ship-based Royal Navy personnel, with 49 given to those who served with other organisations within the British naval service, such as the Royal Naval Brigade and the Royal Marines. The Royal Marines have received 10 Victoria Crosses, the Royal Naval Reserve and Volunteer Reserve being awarded 22 VCs. Richard Bell-Davies of the Royal Naval Air Service also received an award. Note: this list does not include naval awards of the VC to persons serving in navies other than the British, i.e. Lieut. R.H. ("Hammy") Gray, VC, DSC, Royal Canadian Naval Volunteer Reserve.

== Recipients ==
This along with the * indicates that the Victoria Cross was awarded posthumously

| Name | Vessel | Date of action | Conflict | Place of action | Notes |
|---|---|---|---|---|---|
| Thomas Hunter | 43 Commando | 1945* | Second World War | Comacchio, Italy | |
| Eugene Esmonde | Fleet Air Arm; No. 825 Squadron | 1942* | Second World War | Straits of Dover, England | |
| Israel Harding | HMS Alexandria | 1882 | Occupation of Egypt | Alexandria, Egypt | |
| John Robarts | HMS Ardent | 1855 | Crimean War | Sea of Azov, Crimea | |
| John Bythesea | HMS Arrogant | 1854 | Crimean War | Åland, Finland | |
| George Ingouville | HMS Arrogant | 1855 | Crimean War | Fort of Viborg, Finland | |
| William Johnstone | HMS Arrogant | 1854 | Crimean War | Åland, Finland | |
| Norman Holbrook | HMS B11 | 1914 | First World War | Dardanelles, Turkey | |
| William Hewett | HMS Beagle | 1854 | Crimean War | Siege of Sevastopol, Crimea | |
| Joseph Trewavas | HMS Beagle | 1855 | Crimean War | Sea of Azov, Crimea | |
| Richard Sandford | HMS C3 | 1918 | First World War | Zeebrugge Raid, Belgium | |
| John Carless | HMS Caledon | 1917* | First World War | Battle of Heligoland, Germany | |
| Stephen Beattie | HMS Campbeltown | 1942 | Second World War | St. Nazaire, France | |
| Robert Ryder | HMS Campbeltown | 1942 | Second World War | St. Nazaire, France | |
| Jack Cornwell | HMS Chester | 1916* | First World War | Battle of Jutland, Denmark | |
| Augustus Agar | HM Coastal Motor Boat 4 | 1919 | Baltic Campaign | Kronstadt, Russia | |
| Claude Dobson | HM Coastal Motor Boat 31 | 1919 | Baltic Campaign | Kronstadt, Russia | |
| Gordon Steele | HM Coastal Motor Boat 88 | 1919 | Baltic Campaign | Kronstadt, Russia | |
| Edgar Cookson | HMS Comet | 1915* | First World War | Kut-el-Amara, Mesopotamia | |
| Alfred Sephton | HMS Coventry | 1941* | Second World War | Crete, Mediterranean | |
| Edward Daniel | HMS Diamond | 1854 | Crimean War | Siege of Sevastopol, Crimea | |
| Ernest Pitcher | HMS Dunraven | 1917 | First World War | Bay of Biscay, Atlantic | |
| Charles Bonner | HMS Dunraven | 1917 | First World War | Bay of Biscay, Atlantic | |
| Edward Boyle | HMS E14 | 1915 | First World War | Dardanelles, Turkey | |
| Geoffrey White | HMS E14 | 1918* | First World War | Dardanelles, Turkey | |
| Duncan Boyes | HMS Euryalus | 1864 | Bombardment of Shimonoseki | Shimonoseki, Japan | |
| Thomas Pride | HMS Euryalus | 1864 | Bombardment of Shimonoseki | Shimonoseki, Japan | |
| William Seeley | HMS Euryalus | 1864 | Bombardment of Shimonoseki | Shimonoseki, Japan | |
| Gordon Campbell | HMS Farnborough | 1917 | First World War | Atlantic Ocean | |
| Jack Mantle | HMS Foylebank | 1940* | Second World War | Portland, England | |
| Gerald Roope | HMS Glowworm | 1940* | Second World War | Vestfjord, Norway | |
| Henry Ritchie | HMS Goliath | 1914 | First World War | Dar es Salaam, Tanganyika | |
| Bernard Warburton-Lee | HMS Hardy | 1940* | Second World War | Narvik, Norway | |
| Samuel Mitchell | HMS Harrier | 1864 | New Zealand Wars | Te Papa, New Zealand | |
| William Maillard | HMS Hazard | 1898 | Occupation of Crete | Crete, Greece | |
| Charles Lucas | HMS Hecla | 1854 | Crimean War | Åland, Finland | |
| Arthur Wilson | HMS Hecla | 1884 | Mahdist War | Battles of El Teb, Sudan | |
| George Bradford | HMS Iris II | 1918* | First World War | Zeebrugge Raid, Belgium | |
| Edward Fegen | HMS Jervis Bay | 1940* | Second World War | Atlantic Ocean | |
| Humphrey Firman | SS Julnar | 1916* | First World War | Kut-el-Amara, Mesopotamia | |
| Cecil Buckley | HMS Miranda | 1855 | Crimean War | Sea of Azov, Crimea | |
| Henry Cooper | HMS Miranda | 1855 | Crimean War | Taganrog, Crimea | |
| William Savage | HM Motor Gun Boat 314 | 1942* | Second World War | St. Nazaire, France | |
| Edward Bingham | HMS Nestor | 1916 | First World War | Battle of Jutland, Denmark | |
| William Odgers | HMS Niger | 1860 | New Zealand Wars | Omata, New Zealand | |
| Robert Sherbrooke | HMS Onslow | 1942 | Second World War | North Cape, Norway | |
| George Day | HMS Recruit | 1855 | Crimean War | Genitichi, Crimea | |
| Wilfred Malleson | SS River Clyde | 1915 | First World War | Battle of Gallipoli, Turkey | |
| Edward Unwin | SS River Clyde | 1915 | First World War | Battle of Gallipoli, Turkey | |
| William Williams | SS River Clyde | 1915* | First World War | Battle of Gallipoli, Turkey | |
| William Hall | HMS Shannon/Naval Brigade | 1857 | Indian Rebellion of 1857 | Siege of Lucknow, India | |
| George Hinckley | HMS Sphinx | 1862 | Taiping Rebellion | Fung Wha, China | |
| Loftus Jones | HMS Shark | 1916* | First World War | Battle of Jutland, Denmark | |
| Hugh Burgoyne | HMS Swallow | 1855 | Crimean War | Sea of Azov, Crimea | |
| Thomas Gould | HMS Thrasher | 1942 | Second World War | Crete, Mediterranean | |
| Peter Roberts | HMS Thrasher | 1942 | Second World War | Crete, Mediterranean | |
| Anthony Miers | HMS Torbay | 1942 | Second World War | Corfu, Greece | |
| John Linton | HMS Turbulent | 1943* | Second World War | Mediterranean | |
| Malcolm Wanklyn | HMS Upholder | 1941* | Second World War | Sicily, Mediterranean | |
| Eric Robinson | HMS Vengeance | 1915 | First World War | Battle of Gallipoli, Turkey | |
| Alfred Carpenter | HMS Vindictive | 1918 | First World War | Zeebrugge Raid, Belgium | |
| Victor Crutchley | HMS Vindictive | 1918 | First World War | Ostend, Belgium | |
| Arthur Harrison | HMS Vindictive | 1918* | First World War | Zeebrugge Raid, Belgium | |
| Albert McKenzie | HMS Vindictive | 1918 | First World War | Zeebrugge Raid, Belgium | |
| Frederick Peters | HMS Walney | 1942 | Second World War | Oran, Algeria | |
| John Commerell | HMS Weser | 1855 | Crimean War | Sea of Azov, Crimea | |
| William Rickard | HMS Weser | 1855 | Crimean War | Sea of Azov, Crimea | |
| Joseph Kellaway | HMS Wrangler | 1855 | Crimean War | Sea of Azov, Crimea | |
| James Magennis | HMS XE3 | 1945 | Second World War | Johore Straits, Singapore | |
| Basil Place | HMS X7 | 1943 | Second World War | Kåfjord, Norway | |
| Henry Curtis | Naval Brigade | 1855 | Crimean War | Siege of Sevastopol, Crimea | |
| James Gorman | Naval Brigade | 1854 | Crimean War | Battle of Inkerman, Crimea | |
| Basil Guy | Naval Brigade | 1900 | Boxer Rebellion | Tientsin, China | |
| John Harrison | Naval Brigade | 1857 | Indian Rebellion of 1857 | Siege of Lucknow, India | |
| William Peel | Naval Brigade | 1854 | Crimean War | Siege of Sevastopol, Crimea | |
| Henry Raby | Naval Brigade | 1855 | Crimean War | Siege of Sevastopol, Crimea | |
| Thomas Reeves | Naval Brigade | 1854 | Crimean War | Battle of Inkerman, Crimea | |
| Edward Robinson | Naval Brigade | 1858 | Indian Rebellion of 1857 | Siege of Lucknow, India | |
| Nowell Salmon | Naval Brigade | 1857 | Indian Rebellion of 1857 | Siege of Lucknow, India | |
| Mark Scholefield | Naval Brigade | 1854 | Crimean War | Battle of Inkerman, Crimea | |
| John Sheppard | Naval Brigade | 1855 | Crimean War | Siege of Sevastopol, Crimea | |
| John Sullivan | Naval Brigade | 1855 | Crimean War | Siege of Sevastopol, Crimea | |
| John Taylor | Naval Brigade | 1855 | Crimean War | Siege of Sevastopol, Crimea | |
| Thomas Young | Naval Brigade | 1857 | Indian Rebellion of 1857 | Siege of Lucknow, India | |
| Richard Bell-Davies | No. 3 Squadron; Royal Naval Air Service | 1915 | First World War | Ferrijik Junction, Bulgaria | |
| Reginald Warneford | No. 1 Squadron; Royal Naval Air Service | 1915 | First World War | Ghent, Belgium | |
| George Dowell | Royal Marine Artillery | 1855 | Crimean War | Fort of Viborg, Gulf of Finland | |
| Norman Finch | Royal Marine Artillery | 1918 | First World War | Zeebrugge Raid, Belgium | |
| Frederick Lumsden | Royal Marine Artillery | 1917 | First World War | Francilly, France | |
| Thomas Wilkinson | Royal Marine Artillery | 1855 | Crimean War | Siege of Sevastopol, Crimea | |
| Edward Bamford | Royal Marine Light Infantry | 1918 | First World War | Zeebrugge Raid, Belgium | |
| Lewis Halliday | Royal Marine Light Infantry | 1900 | Boxer Rebellion | Peking, China | |
| Francis Harvey | Royal Marine Light Infantry | 1916* | First World War | Battle of Jutland, Denmark | |
| Walter Parker | Royal Marine Light Infantry | 1915 | First World War | Gaba Tepe, Gallipoli, Turkey | |
| John Prettyjohns | Royal Marine Light Infantry | 1854 | Crimean War | Battle of Inkerman, Crimea | |
| Daniel Beak | Royal Naval Volunteer Reserve | 1918 | First World War | Logeast Wood, France | |
| Rowland Louis | Royal Naval Volunteer Reserve | 1918 | First World War | Ostend, Belgium | |
| Charles Cowley | Royal Naval Volunteer Reserve | 1916* | First World War | Kut-el-Amara, Mesopotamia | |
| Percy Dean | Royal Naval Volunteer Reserve | 1918 | First World War | Zeebrugge, Belgium | |
| Geoffrey Drummond | Royal Naval Volunteer Reserve | 1918 | First World War | Ostend, Belgium | |
| Bernard Freyberg | Royal Naval Volunteer Reserve | 1916 | First World War | Battle of the Ancre, France | |
| George Prowse | Royal Naval Volunteer Reserve | 1918 | First World War | Pronville, France | |
| Arthur Tisdall | Royal Naval Volunteer Reserve | 1915 | First World War | Battle of Gallipoli, Turkey | |
| Harold Auten | Royal Naval Reserve | 1918 | First World War | English Channel, England | |
| Charles Bonner | Royal Naval Reserve | 1917 | First World War | Bay of Biscay, Atlantic Ocean | |
| Donald Cameron | Royal Naval Reserve | 1943 | Second World War | Kåfjord, Norway | |
| Thomas Crisp | Royal Naval Reserve | 1917* | First World War | North Sea | |
| George Drewry | Royal Naval Reserve | 1915 | First World War | Battle of Gallipoli, Turkey | |
| Ian Fraser | Royal Naval Reserve | 1945 | Second World War | Johore Straits, Singapore | |
| Frederick Parslow | Royal Naval Reserve | 1915* | First World War | Atlantic Ocean | |
| George Samson | Royal Naval Reserve | 1915 | First World War | Battle of Gallipoli, Turkey | |
| William Sanders | Royal Naval Reserve | 1917* | First World War | Atlantic Ocean | |
| Archibald Smith | Royal Naval Reserve | 1917* | First World War | Atlantic Ocean | |
| Richard Stannard | Royal Naval Reserve | 1940 | Second World War | Namsos, Norway | |
| Ronald Stuart | Royal Naval Reserve | 1917 | First World War | Atlantic Ocean | |
| Joseph Watt | Royal Naval Reserve | 1917 | First World War | Strait of Otranto, Italy | |
| Thomas Wilkinson | Royal Naval Reserve | 1942* | Second World War | Java Sea, Malaya | |
| William Williams | Royal Naval Reserve | 1917 | First World War | Atlantic Ocean | |
