= Battle of Bomarsund =

Battle of the Åland War

Coordinates: 60°12′44″N 20°14′18″E

- Part of the Åland War and the Crimean War
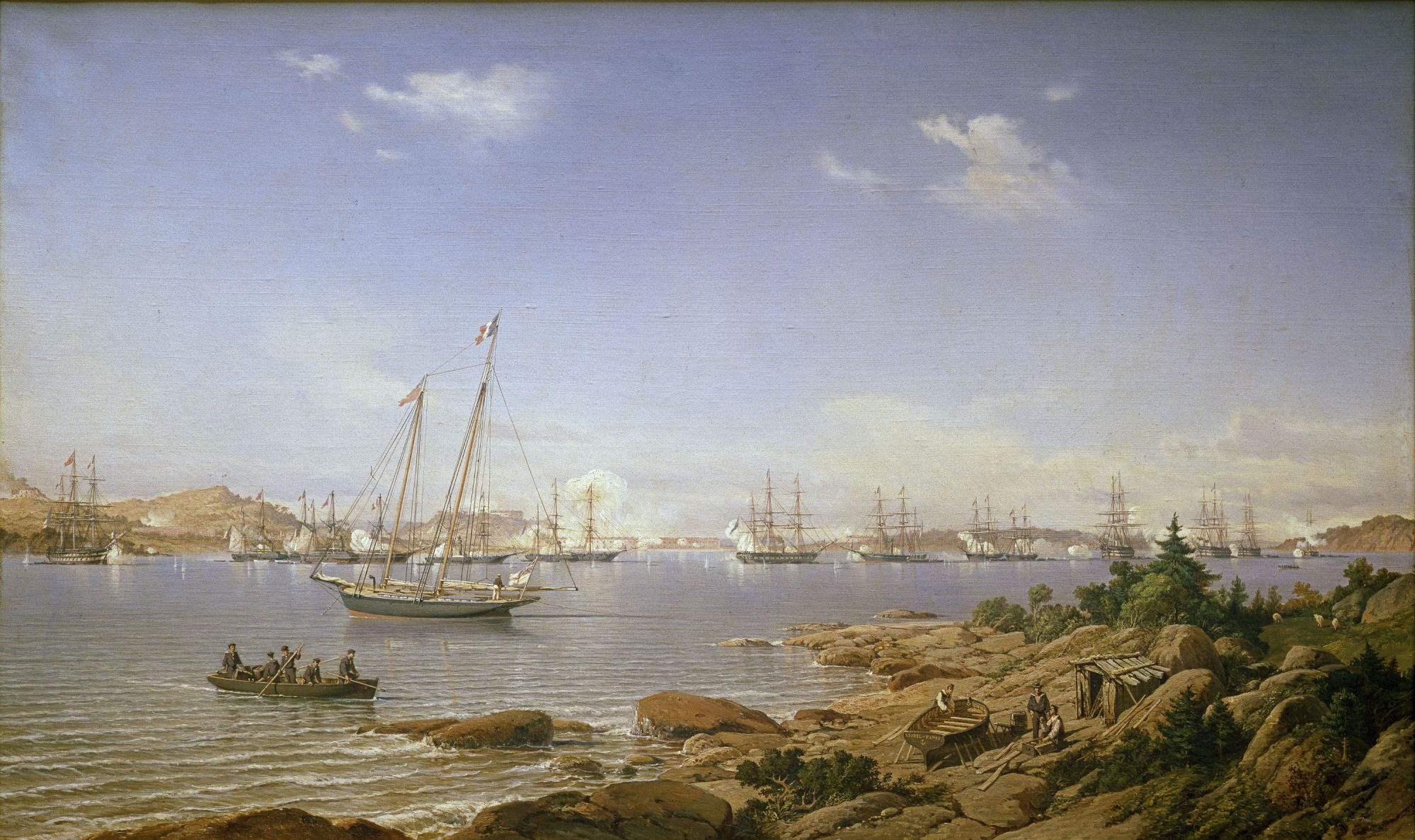
- A painting of the battle by Antoine Léon Morel-Fatio
Date	3–16 August 1854
Location	Bomarsund, Åland
Result	Anglo–French victory

Belligerents
United Kingdom; France	Russia

Commanders and leaders
Charles Napier; Alexandre Deschenes	Jakob Bodisco

Strength
32,000; 25 paddle sloops	3,000

Casualties and losses
85 killed and wounded	53 killed and wounded 2,000 captured

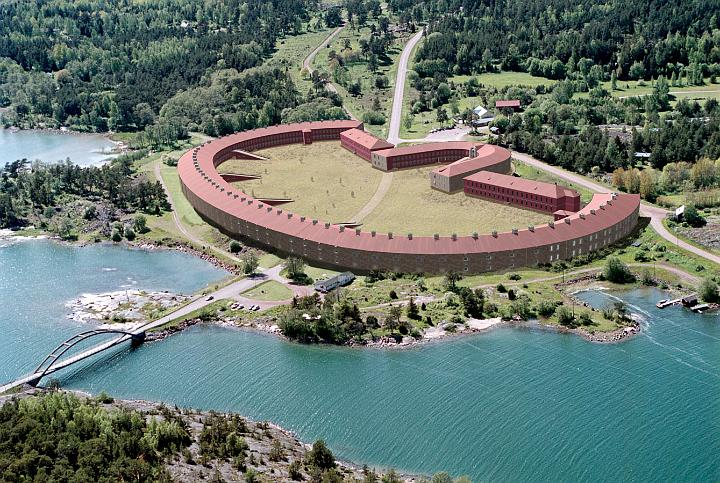
Computer generated image of Bomarsund. Note: the roads and bridge are modern and not from 1854.

The Battle of Bomarsund, in August 1854, took place during the Åland War, which was part of the Crimean War, when an Anglo-French expeditionary force besieged, captured, and subsequently destroyed a Russian fortress. It was the only major action of the war to take place at Bomarsund in the Baltic Sea.

== Background ==
Bomarsund was a 19th-century fortress, the construction of which had started in 1832 by Russia in Sund, Åland, in the Baltic Sea. Bomarsund had not been completed (only two towers of the planned twelve subsidiary towers had been completed). When the war broke out, the fortress remained vulnerable, especially against forces attacking over land. The fortress' designers had also assumed that narrow sea passages near the fortress would not be passable for large naval ships; while this assumption had held true during the time of sailing ships, it was possible for steam powered ships to reach weakly defended sections of the fortress.

== First battle ==
On 21 June 1854, the second class sloop HMS Hecla, second class frigate HMS Odin and the first class frigate HMS Valorous bombarded the Bomarsund fortress. Artillery from the shore, however, responded and, while both sides suffered some damage, the casualties were light. The first battle was indecisive. During the battle, Charles Davis Lucas tossed a shell overboard which had landed on board. The shell exploded before it reached water. For saving his ship he was the first man to be awarded the Victoria Cross.

== Second battle ==
While the first battle had been a brief clash and artillery duel, the second battle was a different affair. By the end of July 1854, a British fleet of 25 ships had surrounded the fortress and only waited for the French ground troops to arrive. Both defender and attacker had acknowledged that the fort could not be defeated by naval forces alone and made preparations accordingly, Russian forces destroyed the surrounding countryside in an effort to force British and French forces to break away from the assumed siege.

On 8 August, a force of 7,000 French soldiers from the regiments Chasseurs de Vincennes, 2e Régiment d'Infanterie Légère, 3e Régiment d'Infanterie, 48e Régiment d'Infanterie and 51e Régiment d'Infanterie landed south of Bomarsund, while the remaining 2,000 French soldiers and a small force of 900 British marines landed on the north. Two days later the artillery landed; the British troops established a battery of three 32-pounder guns on a hill, the French establishing several batteries. On 13 August 1854, the French artillery opened fire on a tower and by the end of the day were in a position that while artillery suppressed the defenders of subsidiary tower of Brännklint, French infantry assaulted it. Defenders found their position to be hopeless and withdrew the bulk of their forces to the main fort, leaving only a small detachment behind to supervise demolition of the tower. While French troops managed to capture the tower before it was demolished, this did not save the tower. Russian artillery opened fire on the captured tower and on 15 August 1854 scored a hit to the gunpowder magazines, triggering an explosion that finished the tower's demolition.

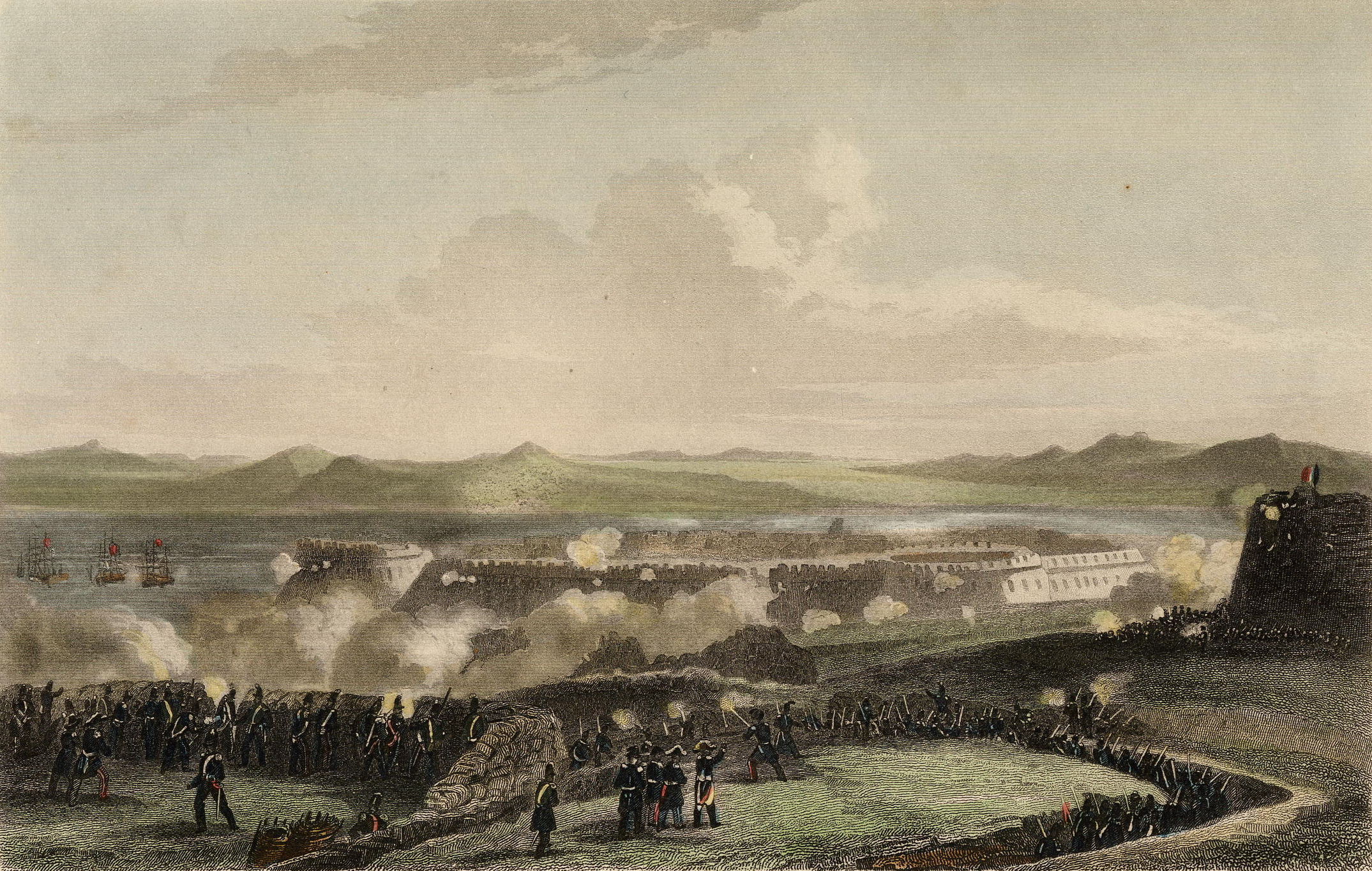
Attack on Bomarsund.

The bombardment of the main fortress started late on 15 August 1854 with land-based guns and the navy opening fire. The second tower, Notvik, was also destroyed after British artillery opened fire from their hill opposite the tower. With only a few guns capable of firing in the direction of the bombarding ships, the Russian forces hoped that the French and British forces would attack by land. However, after the bombardment continued into August 16 without any indication of landings, it became apparent to the Russian commander that British and French intended to reduce the fortress with artillery fire. After eight hours of bombardment, they managed to create a gaping hole in the fortress's walls. On August 16, 1854, after most of the guns had been destroyed, the commandant of the tower surrendered to the British and French forces.

The early surrender came as a surprise to the French and British. 2,000 men laid down their arms and became prisoners.

== Aftermath ==
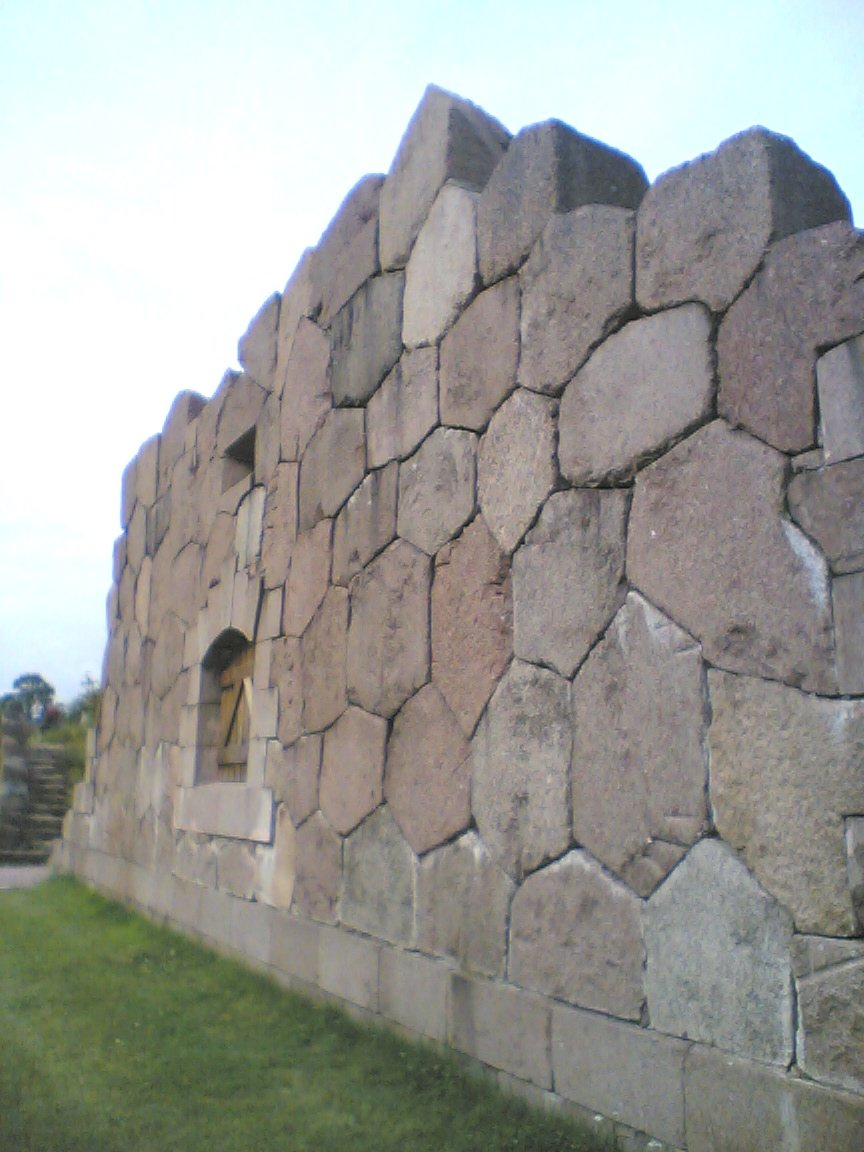
A part of the ruins

After the surrender, French and British forces demolished the fortress. British engineers remained until mid-September to ensure it could not be easily rebuilt. 700,000 bricks from it were brought in barges to Helsinki and then used in the construction of the Uspenski Cathedral.

Three hundred Finnish grenadiers defending the fortress were among the captured, and they were taken to Lewes to be imprisoned there until the end of the war. Upon the conclusion of the war they were released and given passage back to Finland, and they returned with a song about their experiences during the war, called the War of Åland ("Finnish: Oolannin sota, Swedish: "Det Åländska kriget). The Russian Memorial was erected in Lewes in 1877 to commemorate those who died while they were prisoners of war.

In the Treaty of Paris of 1856, the entire Åland Islands were demilitarized, a status that has been preserved until this day.

== Victoria Cross recipients ==
In addition to Charles Davis Lucas several other Victoria Crosses were awarded in the Baltic Theater during the Crimean War.

Other VC recipients for action in the Baltic Sea:

- John Bythesea – 1854; Åland Islands
- William Johnstone – 1854; Åland Islands
- George Ingouville – 1855; Fort of Viborg
- George Dare Dowell – 1855; Fort of Viborg
