= HMS Cruizer (1852) =

Sloop of the Royal Navy

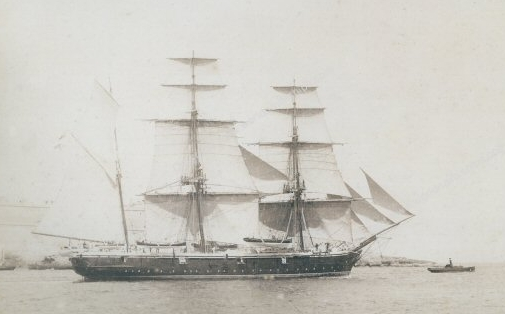
- HMS Cruizer at Malta in 1894 (as HMS Lark)

History

United Kingdom
- Name: Cruizer
- Builder: Royal Dockyard, Deptford
- Cost: £25,213
- Launched: 19 June 1852
- Renamed: HMS Cruiser, 1857; HMS Lark, 1872
- Fate: Sold at Malta in 1912

General characteristics
- Class & type: Cruizer-class screw sloop
- Displacement: 960 tons (Note: The rest of the class displaced 1,045 tons)
- Tons burthen: 747 51/94 bm
- Length: 160 ft (49 m) (gundeck); 140 ft 1.75 in (42.7165 m) (keel)
- Beam: 31 ft 10 in (9.70 m)
- Depth of hold: 17 ft 6 in (5.33 m)
- Installed power: 60 Nominal horsepower; 132 ihp (98 kW)
- Propulsion: Two-cylinder horizontal single-expansion geared steam engine (Note: The rest of the class had non-geared engines developing 100 nominal horsepower); Single screw
- Sail plan: Barque-rigged
- Speed: 6.6 knots (12.2 km/h; 7.6 mph)
- Armament: (Removed 1872); One 32 pdr (56 cwt) pivot gun; Sixteen 32 pdr (32 cwt) carriage guns

HMS Cruizer was a 17-gun wooden screw sloop, the name-ship of the Cruizer class of the Royal Navy, launched at the Royal Dockyard, Deptford in 1852. The spelling of her name was formally altered to HMS Cruiser in 1857. She became a sail training vessel in 1872 and was renamed HMS Lark. She was eventually sold for breaking in 1912.

== History ==
Her first years of service were spent on the China station, during which a party of her crew took part in the Battle of Fatshan Creek in 1857. Her commander, Charles Fellowes, was the first man over the walls of Canton when the city was taken, and the ship saw further action in China, including the attack on the Taku Forts on the Hai River in 1858.

On 20 November 1858, she was in the company of Her Majesty's Ships Furious, Retribution, Dove, and Lee. The squadron were conveying the Earl of Elgin on the Yangtze River, when they had to engage with the Taiping rebels at Nanjing.

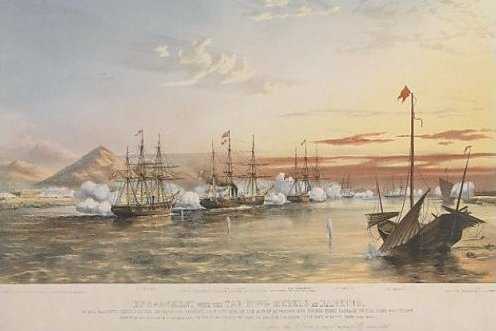
Cruizer in action against the Taiping rebels. T.G.Dutton after F.le Breton Bedwell

In 1860, under the command of John Bythesea, she surveyed the Bohai Sea to prepare moorings for the Allied fleet to disembark troops for the advance on Beijing.

Cruiser was laid up in England in 1867, before being recommissioned for the Mediterranean station.

== Figurehead ==
A figurehead was designed and carved by Hellyer & Son of Portsmouth.

When the ship was sold at Malta for breaking up in 1912, the figurehead was saved, remaining at the dockyard there. It was subsequently transported back to Portsmouth where it was covered in a fiberglass coating and displayed alongside HMS Caradoc’s figurehead at the entrance to the parade area beside HMS Victory at Portsmouth Dockyard, before being placed into storage.

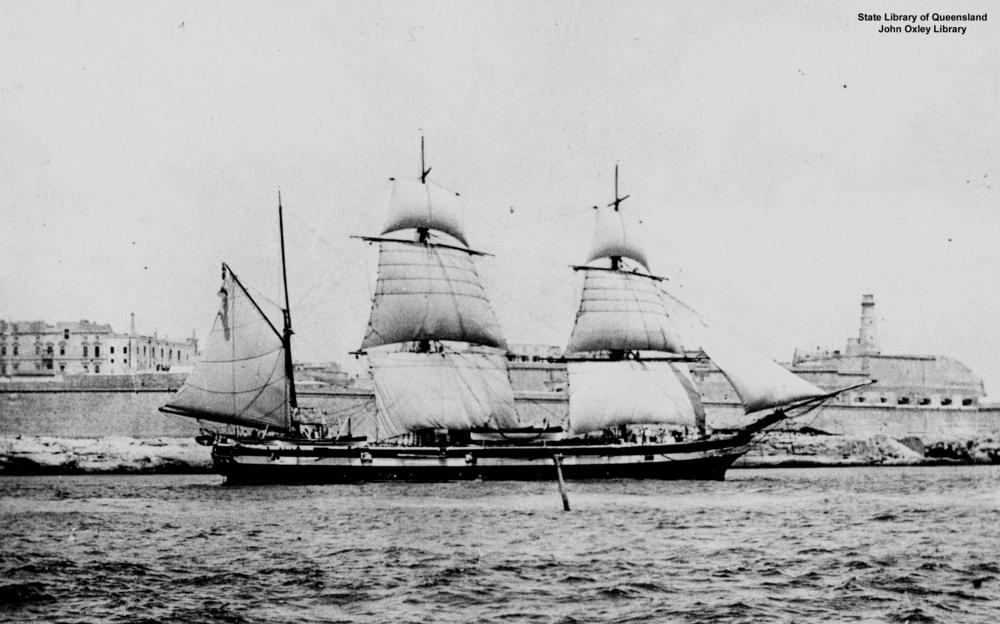
Cruiser at Fort Saint Elmo, Grand Harbour, Malta

== Disposal ==
In 1872, having had her guns and engine removed, she became a sail training ship and was renamed Lark, in which capacity she served until at least 1903. She was finally sold for breaking up at Malta in 1912.
