= HMS Marlborough (1855) =

Ship of the line of the Royal Navy

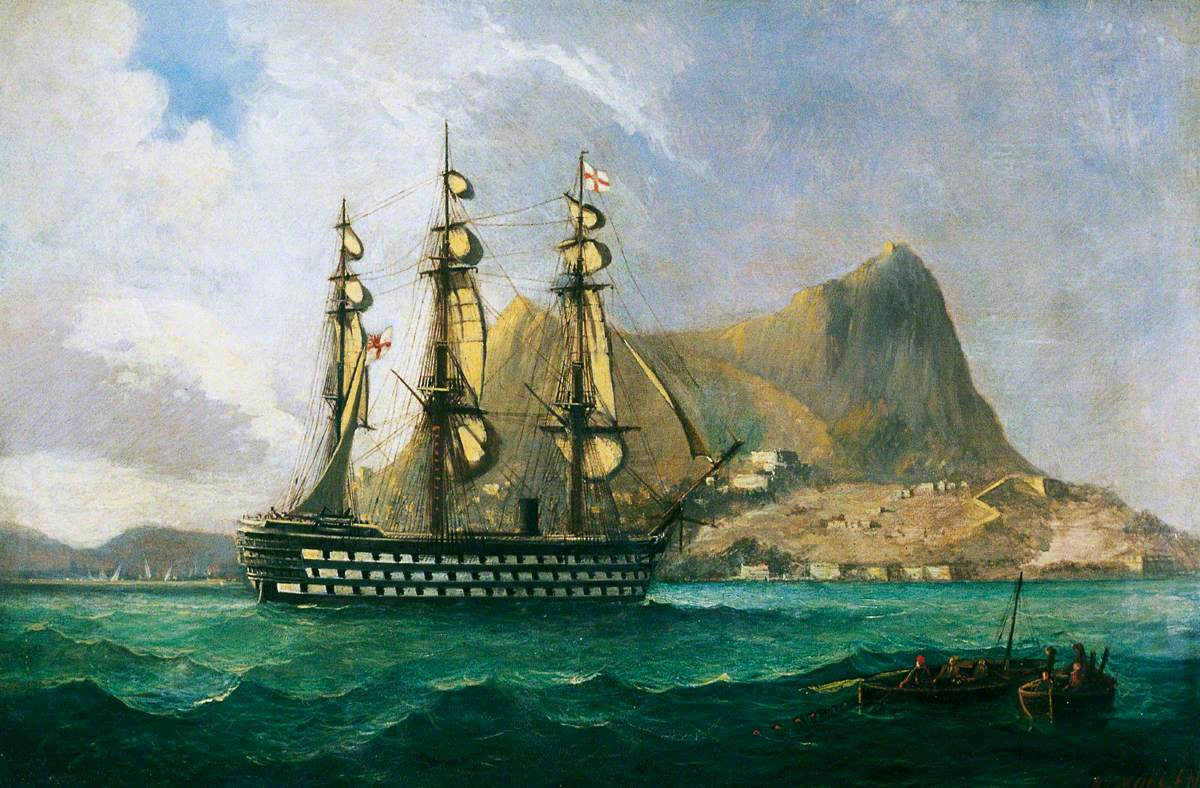
- Painting of Marlborough off Gibraltar, by Henry J. Morgan

History

United Kingdom
- Name: Marlborough
- Namesake: General John Churchill, 1st Duke of Marlborough
- Ordered: 29 June 1848
- Builder: HM Dockyard, Portsmouth
- Laid down: 1 September 1850
- Launched: 31 July 1855
- Completed: 1858
- Commissioned: 1 February 1858
- Renamed: Vernon II, March 1904
- Reclassified: As a receiving ship, 1864, 1890; As a training ship, December 1878; As an accommodation ship, March 1904
- Fate: Sold, October 1924; Sank, 28 November 1924

General characteristics (as built)
- Class & type: 131-gun, modified Queen-class ship of the line
- Displacement: 6,065 long tons (6,162 t)
- Tons burthen: 4,000 38/94 (bm)
- Length: 245 ft 6 in (74.8 m)
- Beam: 61 ft 2.5 in (18.7 m)
- Draught: 21 ft 9 in (6.6 m) (light)
- Depth of hold: 25 ft 4 in (7.7 m)
- Installed power: Boilers; 2,684 ihp (2,001 kW)
- Propulsion: 1 screw; single-expansion steam engine
- Sail plan: Full-rigged ship
- Speed: 11.9 knots (22.0 km/h; 13.7 mph)
- Complement: 1,100
- Armament: 131 muzzle-loading, smoothbore guns: Lower gun deck: 10 × 8 in (203 mm) shell guns + 26 × 32 pdrs (56 cwt); Middle gun deck: 6 × 8 in shell guns + 30 × 32 pdrs (56 cwt); Upper gun deck: 38 × 32 pdrs (42 cwt); Quarterdeck & Forecastle: 20 × 32 pdrs (25cwt) + 1 × 68 pdr (95 cwt)

HMS Marlborough was a 131-gun, first-rate, modified Queen-class ship of the line built for the Royal Navy (RN) during the 1850s. She was converted to screw-propulsion whilst still under construction. Completed in 1858, she served as the flagship of the Mediterranean Fleet until 1864; thereafter she was relegated to secondary duties. The ship served as a receiving ship at Portsmouth after she was paid off and then became a training ship in 1878. Marlborough was transferred to the torpedo school at HMS Vernon in 1904 as a barracks ship and was renamed Vernon II. The ship was sold for scrap in 1924, but capsized enroute to the shipbreaker with the loss of four crewmen.

== Background and description ==
Marlborough was originally ordered on 20 March 1844 as a sister ship of the Surveyor of the Navy, Sir William Symonds's, 110-gun, first rate Queen, but work was suspended on 9 December. After Symonds's resignation in 1847, her design was modified by the Assistant Surveyor John Edye into a 120-gun ship and she was reordered to the modified design on 29 June 1848. She was intended to measure 210 feet (64 m) at the gun deck and 171 feet 1 inch (52.1 m) at the keel. The ship would have had a beam of 60 feet (18.3 m), a depth of hold of 24 feet 8 inches (7.5 m) and had a tonnage of 3,185 61/94 tons burthen. Her crew would have numbered 970 officers and ratings. The ship had the usual three-masted full-ship rig.

The ship was intended to be armed with 120 muzzle-loading, smoothbore guns that consisted of thirty 8 in (203 mm) (65 cwt), 68-pounder shell guns (Note: "Cwt" is the abbreviation for hundredweight, 65 cwt referring to the weight of the gun.) on her lower gun deck, thirty 32-pounder (56 cwt) guns on her middle gun deck and thirty 32-pounders (42 cwt) on her upper gun deck. Her forecastle and quarterdeck would have carried a total of six 32-pounders (42 cwt) and fourteen short 32-pounder (25 cwt) guns between them. Four 18-pounder carronades would have been positioned on her poop deck.

=== Conversion ===
In response to the revolutionary French 90-gun, screw-powered ship of the line, Napoléon, the new Surveyor, Captain Baldwin Wake Walker, had already ordered Marlborough's sister, Windsor Castle (later renamed Duke of Wellington), to be converted to screw power, but the burgeoning arms race between Britain and France in screw-powered ships of the line caused Walker to order Marlborough to be converted along the same lines as Windsor Castle on 30 October 1852, although the bow was lengthened by an extra 5 feet (1.5 m) more than her sister.

Marlborough's length at the gun deck increased to 245 feet 6 inches (74.8 m) and 206 feet 3 inches (62.9 m) on the keel. She had a beam of 61 feet 12.5 inches (18.9 m) and her depth of hold measured 25 feet 10 inches (7.9 m). The ship had a deep draught of 27 feet 3 inches (8.3 m), a tonnage of 4,000 38/94, and displaced 6,065 long tons (6,162 t). Her crew numbered 1,100 officers and ratings. The ship was fitted with a two-cylinder, horizontal, single-expansion steam engine that was built by Maudslay, Sons and Field. It was rated at 800 nominal horsepower and drove a single propeller shaft. To reduce drag and improve performance under sail, the ship could hoist her propeller into the hull and retract the telescoping funnel. During her sea trials on 12 May 1856 in Stokes Bay, the ship's boilers provided enough steam for the engine to produce 2,683 indicated horsepower (2,001 kW) that was good for a speed of 11.9 knots (22.0 km/h; 13.7 mph), although her masts were not rigged.

The ship was armed with 131 guns that consisted of twenty-six 32-pounder (56 cwt) guns and ten 8-inch (65 cwt), 68-pounder shell guns on her lower gun deck, thirty 56-cwt 32-pounder guns and six 8-inch shell guns on her middle gun deck and thirty-eight 32-pounders (42 cwt) on her upper gun deck. Between her forecastle and quarterdeck, she carried twenty 32-pounder gunnades and a single 68-pounder gun that was positioned on the forecastle as a pivot gun so that it could serve as a bow chaser.

== Construction and career ==
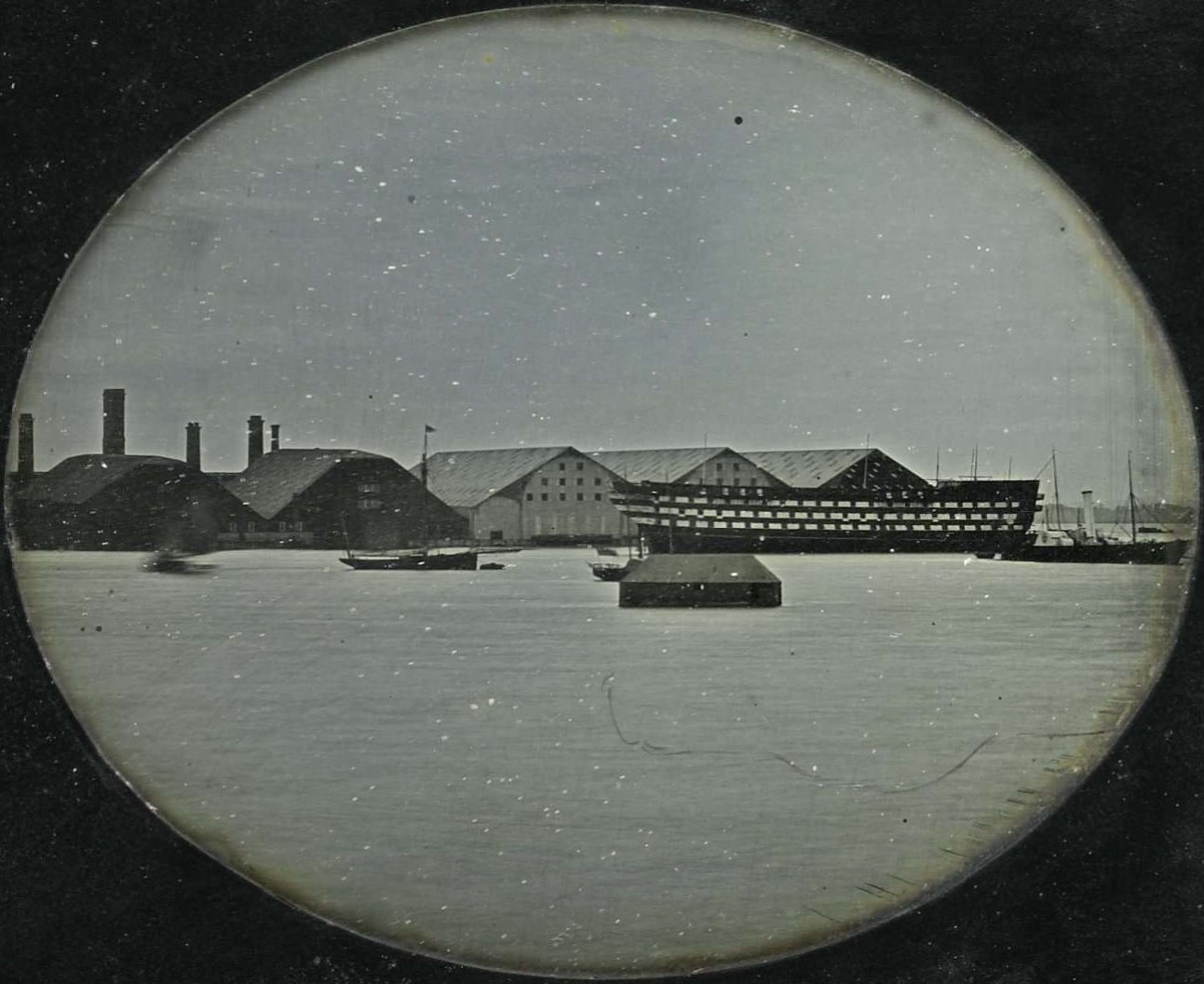
Photo of Marlborough taken shortly after launch. The covered slipways of Portsmouth Dockyard (in one of which she had been built) can be seen behind her

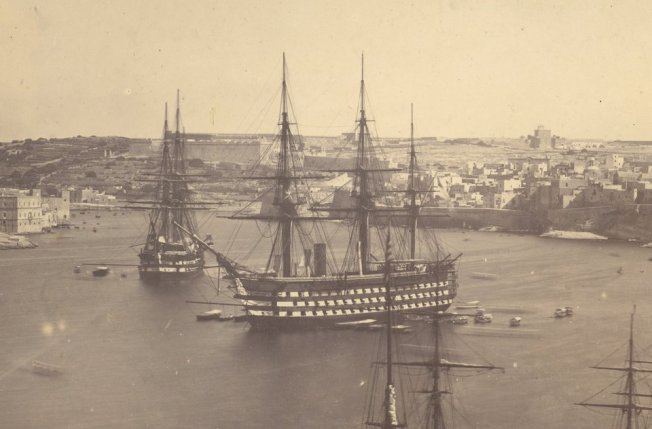
HMS Marlborough in Valletta harbour, sometime between 1858 and 1864

Named after General John Churchill, 1st Duke of Marlborough, Marlborough was the third ship of her name to serve in the RN. She was laid down at HM Dockyard, Portsmouth, on 1 September 1850. Problems with her launching took a week to resolve and the ship finally entered the water on 31 July 1855. Marlborough was commissioned on 1 February 1858 by Captain Lord Frederick Kerr and was completed by 22 February as she became as the flagship of Vice-Admiral Arthur Fanshawe, Commander-in-Chief of the Mediterranean Fleet. Vice-Admiral William Martin relieved Fanshawe on 19 April 1860 and Captain William Houston Stewart relieved Kerr on 3 May. Martin was relieved in his turn by Vice-Admiral Robert Smart on 20 April 1863 as was Stewart by Captain Charles Fellowes in June. The ship was paid off on 1 December 1864 and became a receiving ship at Portsmouth.

By 1870 her armament had been reduced to 98 guns and to 70 guns in 1875. In December 1877 she became a training ship for engineers. and later as a receiving ship for the Steam Reserve in 1890, as tender to HMS Asia). In 1904, Marlborough was moved to Portchester Creek and renamed Vernon II in March, she became an accommodation hulk to the HMS Vernon torpedo school. (Vernon I was the joint name for the establishment's two existing hulks, HMS Ariadne and HMS Actaeon)

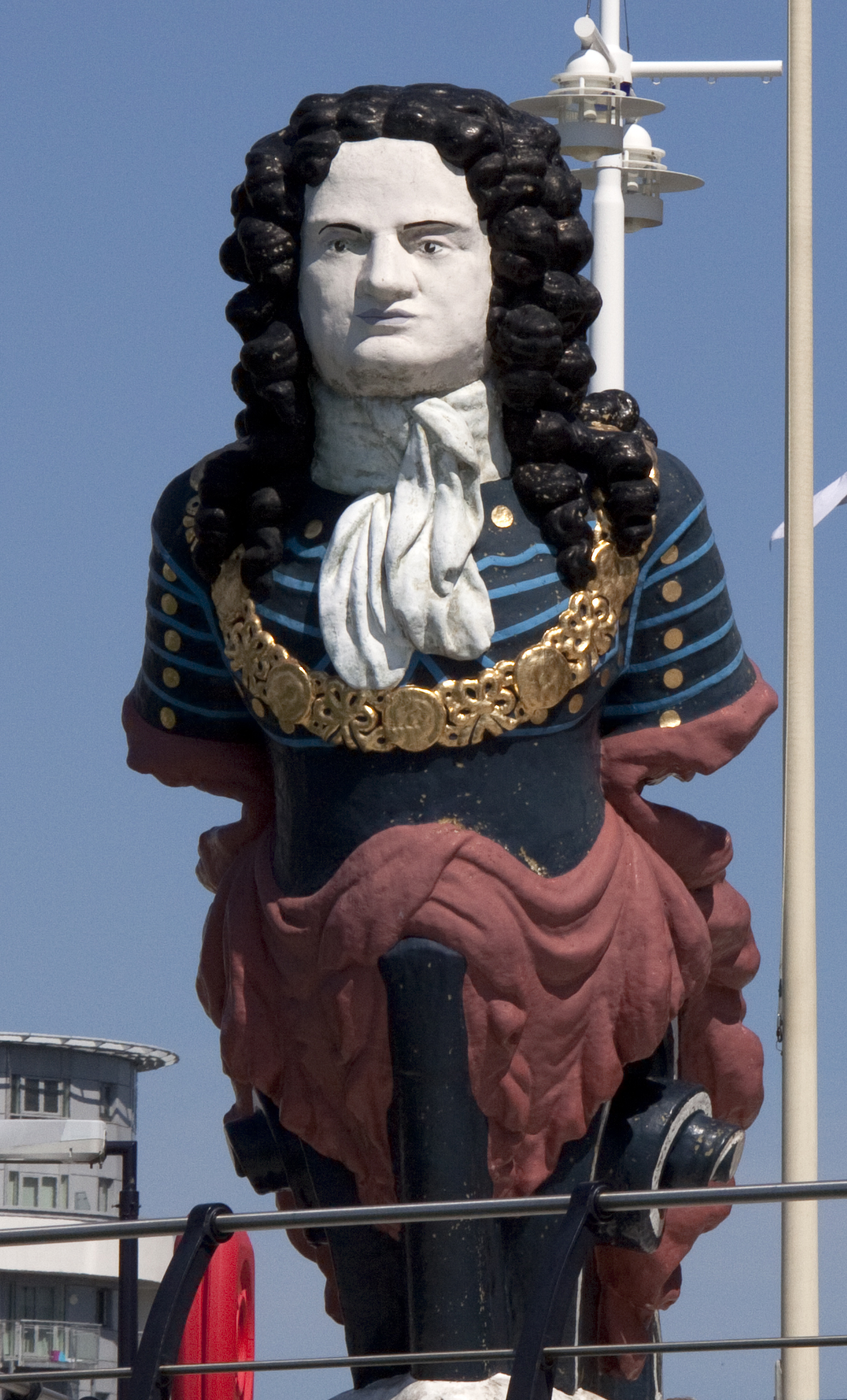
Her figurehead in Portsmouth

In 1923, HMS Vernon moved ashore, and the old hulks were no longer required. Marlborough was sold to A. Butcher for breaking up in October 1924, but capsized and sank with the loss of four men on 28 November 1924 off Selsey while being towed to the breakers at Osea Island, Essex. Marlborough's figurehead was removed before her sale and can be seen at the Gunwharf Quays shopping centre in Portsmouth, which was built on the site of the old HMS Vernon shore establishment.

== Bibliography ==
- Colledge, J. J.; Warlow, Ben & Bush, Steve (2020). Ships of the Royal Navy: The Complete Record of all Fighting Ships of the Royal Navy from the 15th Century to the Present (5th revised and updated ed.). Seaforth Publishing. ISBN 978-1-5267-9327-0.
- Lambert, Andrew D. (1984). Battleships in Transition: The Creation of the Steam Battlefleet 1815-1860. Conway Maritime Press. ISBN 0-85177-315-X.
- Manning, T. D. & Walker, C. F. (1959). British Warship Names. Putnam. OCLC 838607.
- Warlow, B. (2000) [1992]. Shore Establishments of the Royal Navy (Revised and enlarged ed.). Maritime Books. ISBN 0-907771-73-4.
- Winfield, Rif (2014). British Warships in the Age of Sail 1817–1863: Design, Construction, Careers and Fates. Seaforth Publishing. ISBN 978-1-84832-169-4.
- Winfield, Rif (2010). First Rate: The Greatest Warships of the Age of Sail. Naval Institute Press. ISBN 978-1-59114-264-5.
