= John Sullivan (VC) =

Recipient of the Victoria Cross

- Born: 10 April 1830; Bantry, County Cork
- Died: 28 June 1884 (aged 54); Kinsale, County Cork
- Burial place: Nohoval, Co. Cork
- Military career
- Allegiance: United Kingdom
- Branch: Royal Navy
- Rank: Chief Boatswain's Mate
- Conflicts: Crimean War
- Awards: Victoria Cross; Conspicuous Gallantry Medal; Sardinian Crimea Medal; Legion of Honour (France)

John Sullivan, VC, CGM (10 April 1830 – 28 June 1884) was a sailor in the Royal Navy and an Irish recipient of the Victoria Cross, the highest award for gallantry in the face of the enemy that can be awarded to British and Commonwealth forces.

== Royal Navy ==
Sullivan was 25 years old, and a boatswain's mate in the Royal Navy, serving in the Naval Brigade during the Crimean War, when the following deed took place for which he was awarded the Victoria Cross (VC).

On 10 April 1855 at Sebastopol, in Crimea, Boatswain's Mate Sullivan, as captain of one of the guns at Greenhill Battery, volunteered to place a flagstaff on a mound to act as an aiming point. He carried out this dangerous task undeterred by continuous fire from enemy sharpshooters, and his action enabled the battery to open fire on hitherto concealed enemy guns which were doing great damage to some of the advanced works.

Sullivan later achieved the rank of chief boatswain's mate. He committed suicide at Kinsale, County Cork, on 28 June 1884.
