= Charles Fellowes =

Vice-Admiral Charles Fellowes CB
- Born: 19 October 1823
- Died: 8 March 1886 (aged 62)
- Military career
- Allegiance: United Kingdom
- Branch: Royal Navy
- Service years: 1836–1886
- Rank: Vice-Admiral
- Commands: HMS Princess Royal; HMS Revenge; HMS Marlborough; HMS Duke of Wellington; HMS Duncan; HMS Indus; Channel Fleet
- Conflicts: Second Opium War
- Awards: Companion of the Order of the Bath

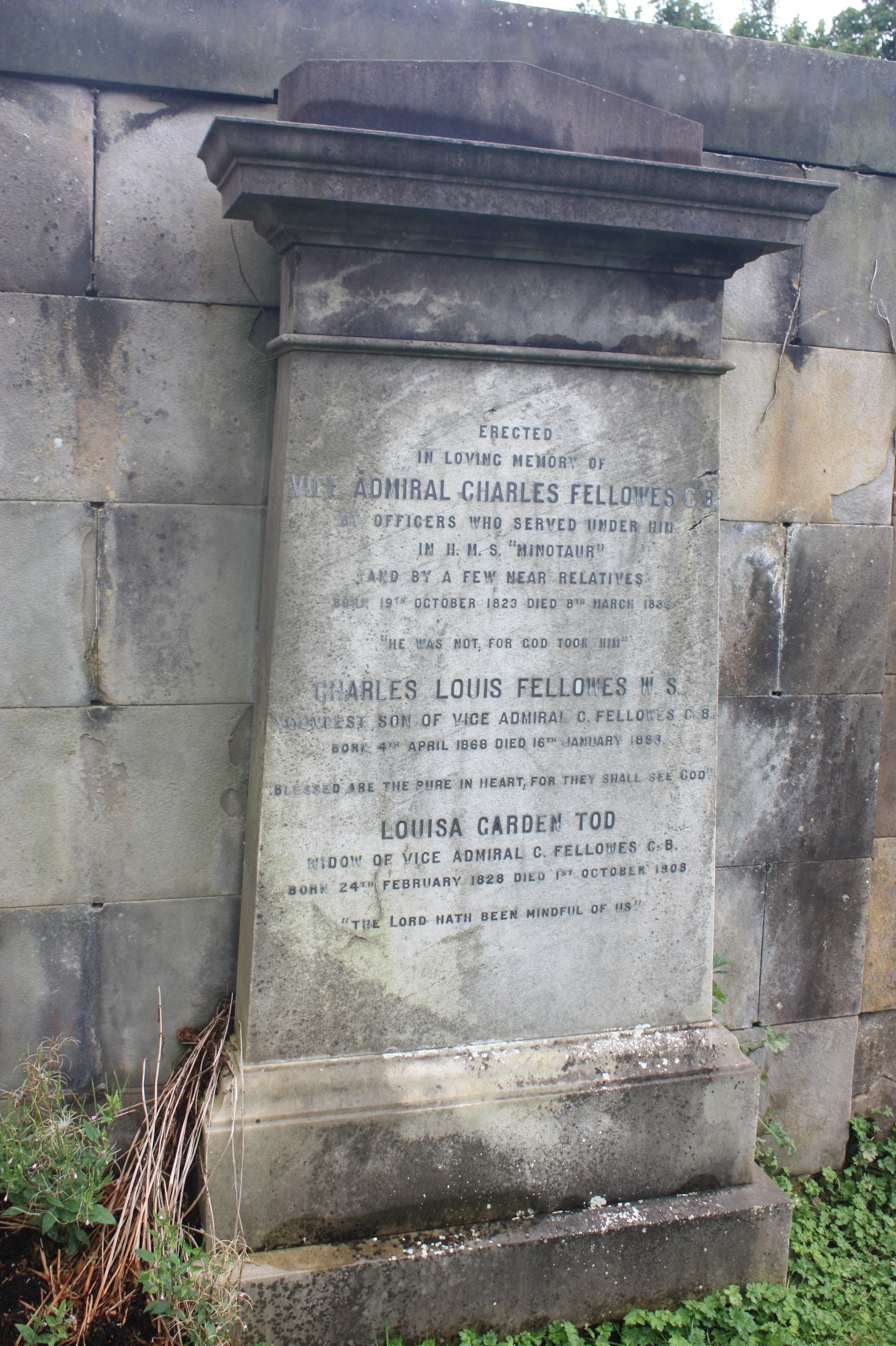
The grave of Vice Admiral Charles Fellowes, Dean Cemetery

Vice-Admiral Charles Fellowes CB (19 October 1823 – 8 March 1886) was a Royal Navy officer who went on to be Commander-in-Chief, Channel Fleet.

== Naval career ==
Fellowes joined the Royal Navy in 1836. He fought in the Second Opium War, and as Commander of HMS Cruizer, is credited with having been the first person to climb the walls of Canton in 1856 before any other officer or man of the Naval Brigade. The flag he seized was presented to Greenwich Hospital by Queen Victoria in 1859.

Promoted to captain in 1858, he was given command of HMS Princess Royal, HMS Revenge, HMS Marlborough, HMS Duke of Wellington, HMS Duncan and then HMS Indus. He was appointed Captain Superintendent of Chatham dockyard in 1874, Admiral Superintendent of Chatham dockyard in 1876 and Commander-in-Chief, Channel Fleet in 1885, serving on HMS Minotaur. He died in that role the following year.

He is buried in the south-west corner of the north section of Dean Cemetery in Edinburgh against the dividing wall to the earlier original cemetery.

== Family ==
In 1859 he married Louisa Garden Tod (1828–1908). Their eldest son was Rev John Charles Fellowes MA (1860–1927).

== See also ==
- O'Byrne, William Richard (1849). "Fellowes, Charles" . A Naval Biographical Dictionary . John Murray – via Wikisource.

Military offices
Preceded by Sir Algernon de Horsey	Commander-in-Chief, Channel Fleet; 1885–1886	Succeeded by Sir William Hewett
