= John Sheppard (VC) =

Recipient of the Victoria Cross

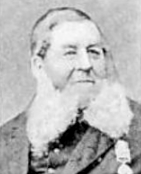
- Born: 22 September 1817; Hull, East Riding of Yorkshire, England
- Died: 17 December 1884 (aged 67); Padstow, Cornwall, England
- Burial place: Padstow Cemetery
- Military career
- Allegiance: United Kingdom
- Branch: Royal Navy
- Rank: Boatswain First Class
- Units: HMS St Jean d'Acre
- Conflicts: Crimean War; Second Anglo-Chinese War
- Awards: Victoria Cross; Conspicuous Gallantry Medal; Legion of Honour (France)

John Sheppard (sometimes spelled Shepherd or Shepheard) , VC, CMG (22 September 1817 – 17 December 1884) was a sailor in the Royal Navy and a recipient of the Victoria Cross, the highest award for gallantry in the face of the enemy that can be awarded to British and Commonwealth forces.

== Royal Navy career ==
Sheppard was 37 years old, and a boatswain's mate in the Royal Navy, serving with the Naval Brigade during the Crimean War, when the following deed took place for which he was awarded the Victoria Cross (VC).

On 15 July 1855 at Sebastopol, Crimean Peninsula, Boatswain's Mate Sheppard went into the harbour at night, in a punt, which he had especially constructed for the purpose, with an explosive device with which he intended to blow up one of the Russian warships. He managed to get past the enemy's steamboats at the entrance of Careening Bay, but was prevented from getting further by a long string of boats carrying enemy troops. He made a second attempt on 16 August but although both these actions were unsuccessful, they were boldly conceived and carried out in the face of great danger.

Sheppard was only the fourth person to be awarded the Victoria Cross, and the first from Hull, East Riding of Yorkshire. He later achieved the rank of boatswain first class. His Victoria Cross is displayed at the National Maritime Museum, Greenwich, England.
