= Roderick McGregor =

Recipient of the Victoria Cross

- Born: c. 1822; Dunain, Highland
- Died: 9 August 1888 (aged 65–66); Buntait, Highland
- Burial place: St. Mary's Churchyard, Drumnadrochit
- Military career
- Allegiance: United Kingdom
- Branch: British Army
- Rank: Corporal
- Units: The Rifle Brigade (Prince Consort's Own)
- Conflicts: Crimean War; Indian Mutiny
- Awards: Victoria Cross; Médaille militaire (France)

Roderick McGregor VC (c. 1822 – 9 August 1888) was a Scottish recipient of the Victoria Cross, the highest and most prestigious award for gallantry in the face of the enemy that can be awarded to British and Commonwealth forces.

== Details ==
McGregor was about 31 years old, and a private in the 1st Battalion, The Rifle Brigade (Prince Consort's Own), British Army during the Crimean War when the following deed took place for which he was awarded the VC.

In July 1855 at the Quarries, Crimea, a bandsman going to fetch water from a well in front of the advanced trench, was killed. A number of men at once rushed out determined to drive the Russian riflemen from the pits which they occupied. Private McGregor and two others were the first to reach the Russians, whom they drove out, killing some. Private McGregor was employed as a sharpshooter in the advance trenches before Sebastopol. He crossed an open space under fire and, taking cover under a rock, dislodged two Russians who were occupying a rifle-pit.

The official citation was as follows:

For courageous conduct when employed as a sharpshooter in the advanced trenches in the month of July, 1855; a Rifle Pit was occupied by two Russians, who annoyed our troops by their fire. Private McGregor crossed the open space under fire, and taking cover under a rock, dislodged them, and occupied the pit.

== Further information ==
Grave and memorial located at St. Mary's Churchyard, Drumnadrochit (also known as Old Kilmore Churchyard) near Urquhart, Highland Region, Scotland. Headstone.

== The medal ==
His Victoria Cross is displayed at the Royal Green Jackets (Rifles) Museum in Winchester, England.
