= Conspicuous Gallantry Medal =

British military decoration

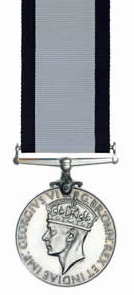
- CGM obverse (Flying)
- Type: Military decoration
- Awarded for: Gallantry in action
- Presented by: UK and other Commonwealth countries
- Eligibility: British and formerly Commonwealth forces
- Status: Discontinued 1993
- Established: 13 September 1855; Re-established: 7 July 1874

Highlights
- Total: Victoria: 63; Edward VII: 2 George V: 110 (& 1 bar); George VI: 191; Elizabeth II: 3 Total: 369
- Ribbon bar: Pre and post 1921 Ribbon bar: CGM (Flying)

Order of Wear
- Next (higher): Distinguished Conduct Medal
- Next (lower): George Medal

The Conspicuous Gallantry Medal (CGM) was, until 1993, a military decoration for gallantry in action. Initially, it was awarded to petty officers and seamen of the Royal Navy, including Warrant Officers and other ranks of the Royal Marines. The CGM was also later awarded to personnel of other Commonwealth navies. From 1943, it was also awarded to NCOs of the Royal Air Force and other Commonwealth air forces, for conspicuous gallantry in action against the enemy in the air. The CGM was officially discontinued in 1993.

== History ==
The Conspicuous Gallantry Medal was the second level bravery award for ratings of the Royal Navy, ranking below the Victoria Cross and, after its institution in 1914, above the Distinguished Service Medal. It was normally awarded with an annuity or gratuity. In 1943, during the Second World War, a Royal Air Force version, the Conspicuous Gallantry Medal (Flying), was added. Since 1917, recipients have been entitled to use the post-nominal letters "CGM".

The original Royal Navy medal was instituted in 1855 to recognise gallantry during the Crimean War, as the Naval counterpart of the Distinguished Conduct Medal. Only twelve were finally awarded, with the medals created by adapting existing examples of the Royal Marines Meritorious Service Medal, with the words 'MERITORIOUS SERVICE' erased from the reverse inscription, and 'CONSPICUOUS GALLANTRY' engraved in its place.

The Conspicuous Gallantry Medal was re-instituted on 7 July 1874 as a permanent decoration, and was initially used to reward gallantry in the various colonial campaigns of the late nineteenth century in which the Royal Navy took part.

It remained an exclusively Naval award until World War II when a number of changes were made. Eligibility was extended in April 1940 to Royal Air Force personnel serving with the Fleet; in July 1942 to Army personnel serving afloat, for example manning a merchant ship's anti-aircraft guns; and in September 1942 to ratings of the Merchant Navy.

In January 1943 the Conspicuous Gallantry Medal (Flying) was established for acts of conspicuous gallantry whilst flying in active operations against the enemy, of a standard below that required for the Victoria Cross, but above that for the Distinguished Flying Medal.

In 1979 eligibility for a number of British awards, including the CGM, was extended to permit posthumous awards. Until that time, only the Victoria Cross and a mention in dispatches could be awarded posthumously.

In 1993, the Conspicuous Gallantry Medal, Distinguished Service Order (when awarded specifically for gallantry) and Distinguished Conduct Medal were all replaced by the Conspicuous Gallantry Cross (CGC). The CGC is tri-service and is awarded to all ranks. It is second only to the Victoria Cross for bravery in action.

The CGM had also been awarded by Commonwealth countries but by the 1990s most, including Canada, Australia and New Zealand, had established their own honours systems and no longer recommended British honours.

== Description ==
Apart from the ribbon, the medals awarded for service afloat and for flying are identical. The medal is circular, silver, 36 millimetres (1.4 in) in diameter with the following design:

- The obverse bears the head and titles of the reigning monarch. The 1855 version has the date '1848' below the Queen's effigy, reflecting that the medals were adapted from specimens of the earlier Meritorious Service Medal.
- The reverse has the words 'FOR CONSPICUOUS GALLANTRY' in three lines, encircled by a laurel wreath and surmounted by an Imperial Crown.
- The ribbon is suspended from a straight bar suspension, although the 1855 version and some later Victorian issues are fitted with an ornate scroll suspender.
- The name, rank, service number of the recipient are engraved or impressed on the rim of the medal. Some medals also note the ship, date and place of the action where the medal was won.
- The ribbon for the naval version was changed in 1921 from three equal stripes of dark blue white and dark blue, to white with narrow dark blue edges, the same as the Naval General Service Medal. The ribbon of the CGM (Flying) is sky blue with narrow dark blue edge stripes.
- A silver, laurelled bar could be awarded for additional acts of pre-eminent bravery. Only one was awarded, in 1918 to the Naval version of the medal.

=== Design variations ===
The medal was awarded with one of five obverses:

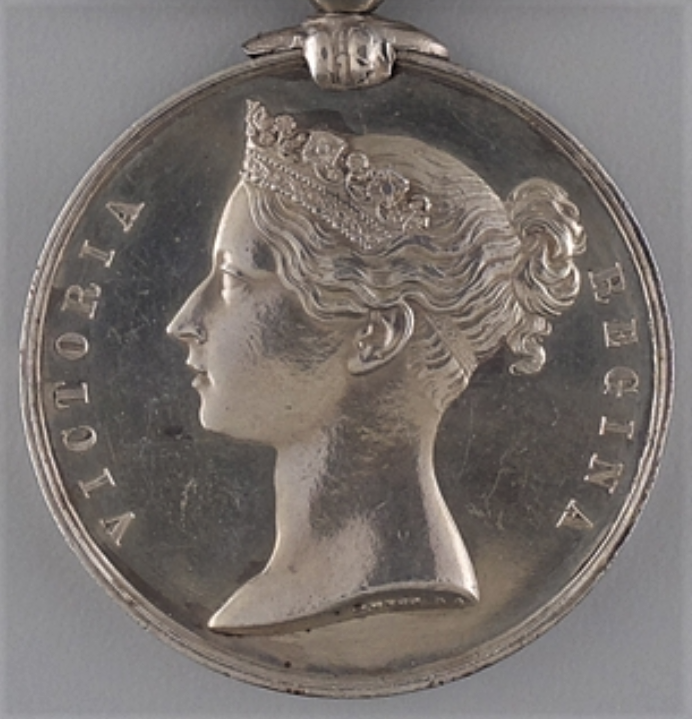
Victoria (1855–1901)
(1855 version has '1848' below Queen's bust)

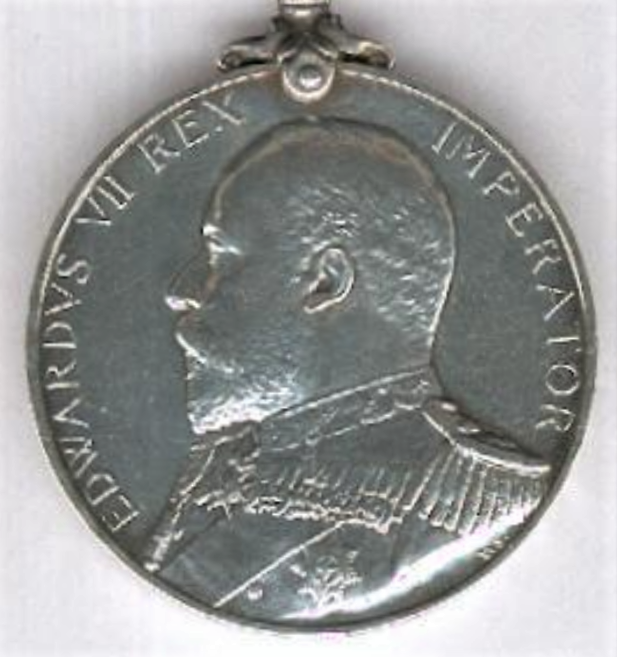
Edward VII (1902–10)

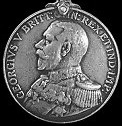
George V (1911–36)

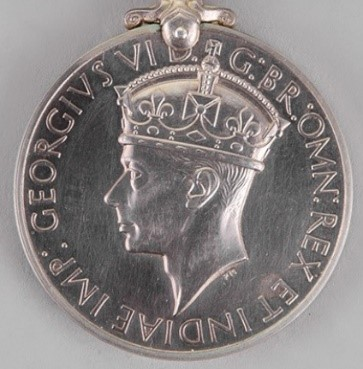
George VI (1937–51)

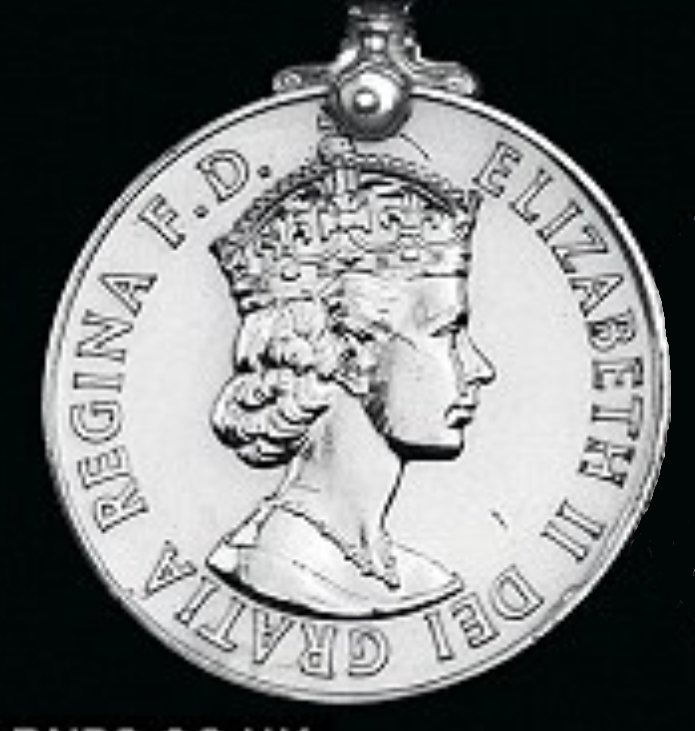
Elizabeth II (1952–93)

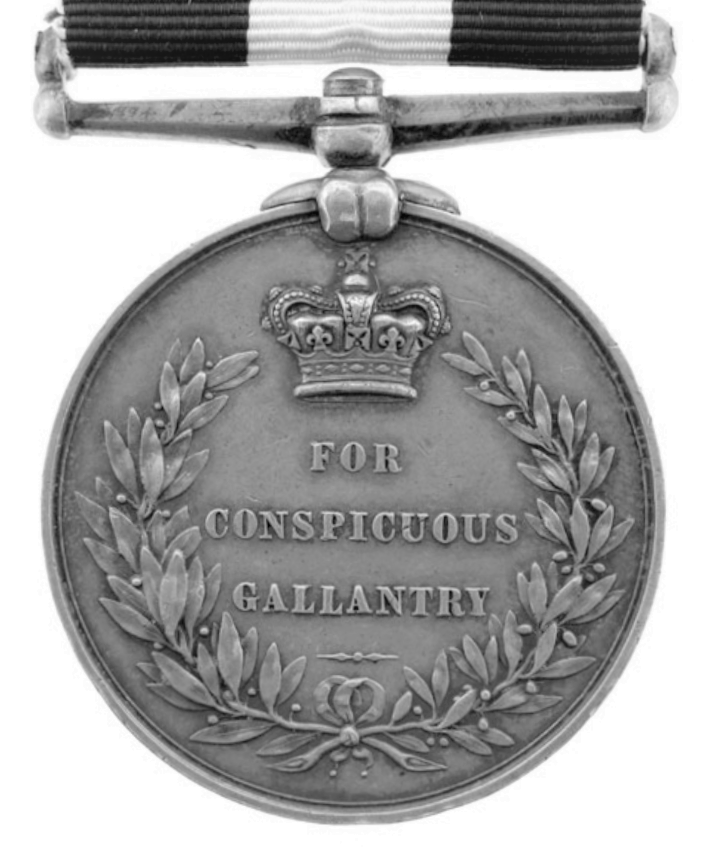
Reverse design for all versions

== Recipients ==
=== Number of awards ===
Between 1855 and 1993 a total of 369 medals and one second award bar were awarded.

Period	CGM (Sea)	CGM (Air)	Bar
1855	12	–	–
1874–1901	51	–	–
1902–1913	2	–	–
1914–1919	108	–	1
1920–1938	2	–	–
1939–1945	80	111	–
1946–1993	2	1	–
Total	257	112	1

The above figures for World War II include ten honorary awards to servicemen from allied countries, eight for service afloat and two for gallantry while flying.

=== Notable recipients ===
- George Ingouville was awarded both the Victoria Cross and the Conspicuous Gallantry Medal during the Crimean War.
- Acting Chief Petty Officer Arthur Robert Blore, who served with the Royal Naval Division, won the CGM in 1915 and a bar in 1918.
- "Bugler Ernest Sillince. Royal Marine Light Infantry behaved with distinguished gallantry on 4 May (1915) during operations South of Achi Baba, (Gallipoli Campaign) in volunteering to throw back enemy bombs into enemy lines at great personal risk, thereby saving the lives of many of his comrades."
- "Sergeant Frank John Knill of the Royal Marines, R.M.A. ... was in charge of HMS Vindictive's howitzer, which fired continuously under the most difficult conditions during the whole period that the ship was alongside the mole at Zeebrugge during the [1918] Zeebrugge raid. In spite of being semi-gassed, he did not leave his post, but remained in charge of his gun until it ceased firing."
- Jesse Elton from Poole, the ship's cook on the Naval Yacht Bystander, who swam to rescue 25 evacuees from the bombed and sunken SS King Orry (1913) during the Battle of Dunkirk in May 1940. He received the CGM from the King at Buckingham Palace.
- Wireless Operator F/Sgt Geoffrey Keen DFM was the first member of the Royal Canadian Air Force to be awarded the CGM and one of only eleven airmen during the Second World War to be awarded both the CGM and the Distinguished Flying Medal. During the bomb run in a raid on Essen on the night of 12/13 March 1943 his Wellington bomber was hit by flak, killing the navigator and blowing off Keen's right foot. For the remainder of the return flight, disregarding his wounds and whilst continually losing blood, for over two hours, Keen continued to repair his damaged radio set and on two occasions dragged himself to the navigator's compartment to assist the pilot with essential information for navigating the aircraft safely back to base. All three remaining members of the crew were awarded the DFC while Keen was recommended for the Victoria Cross.
- Corporal John Coughlan RAAF was awarded the CGM in 1968, for actions as a helicopter crewman in Vietnam. This was the only CGM (Flying) to be awarded after World War II.
- Sergeant Ian Prescott (Royal Engineers) awarded the CGM posthumously during the Falklands War 1982. (Naval award as on a Naval task).
- CPO (Diver) Hammond was the last recipient of the CGM, for the 1991 Gulf War, before the inception of the Conspicuous Gallantry Cross in 1993.
- Acting Chief Petty Officer Max Bernays, RCN was one of only two CGMs awarded to the RCN during WWII."For valour and dauntless devotion to duty. Acting Chief Petty Officer Bernays was steering HMCS Assiniboine during an action at close range with an enemy U-boat. A fire caused by enemy shells broke out on the flag deck, compelling the telegraphmen to leave the wheelhouse leaving A/CPO Bernays alone. With complete disregard for his own safety, with flames and smoke obscuring his only exit, with enemy explosive shell fragments entering the wheelhouse, this 36comparatively young rating remained at this post for nearly forty minutes. Appreciating the crucial importance of his duties in an action, the success of which depended in a large measure on the precise steering of the ship and execution of telegraph orders, he not only carried out exactly and effectively all the helm orders but also dispatched 133 telegraph orders, necessary to accomplish the destruction of the U-Boat. The final success of the sinking of the U-Boat was largely due to the high courage and determination of A/CPO Max Leopold Bernays who, in circumstances of the gravest personal danger carried out not only his own, but two other ratings' duties in exemplary fashion. His conduct throughout the action added another incident of the utmost bravery to the annals of the Royal Canadian Navy."

== See also ==
- British and Commonwealth orders and decorations
