= Thomas Wilkinson (VC 1855) =

Recipient of the Victoria Cross

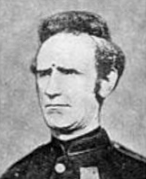
- Born: 1831; York, England
- Died: 22 September 1887 (aged 55–56); York, England
- Burial place: York Cemetery
- Military career
- Allegiance: United Kingdom
- Branch: Royal Marines
- Service years: 1847–1871
- Rank: Sergeant Instructor
- Units: Royal Marine Artillery
- Conflicts: Crimean War
- Awards: Victoria Cross; Legion of Honour (France)

Thomas Wilkinson, VC (1831 – 22 September 1887) was a British soldier and a recipient of the Victoria Cross, the highest award for gallantry in the face of the enemy that can be awarded to British and Commonwealth forces.

== Military career ==
Wilkinson was about 24 years old, and a bombardier in the Royal Marine Artillery, Royal Marines, during the Crimean War when the following deed took place for which he was awarded the Victoria Cross (VC).

On 7 June 1855 at Sebastopol, Crimea, Bombardier Wilkinson was especially recommended for gallant conduct with the advanced batteries. He worked at the task of placing sandbags to repair damage done to the defences under a most galling fire.

Wilkinson later achieved the rank of sergeant instructor. His Victoria Cross is displayed at the Royal Marines Museum, Southsea, England.
