= John Bythesea =

Royal Navy officer

Rear-Admiral John Bythesea VC CB CIE
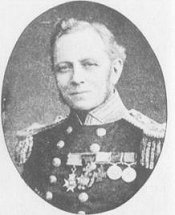
- Born: 15 June 1827; Freshford, Somerset
- Died: 18 May 1906 (aged 78); South Kensington, London
- Military career
- Allegiance: United Kingdom
- Branch: Royal Navy
- Service years: 1841–1877
- Rank: Rear-Admiral
- Commands: HMS Locust (1855–1856); HMS Cruizer (1858–1861); HMS Archer (1863–1864); HMS Phoebe (1867–1870); HMS Lord Clyde (1871–1872)
- Conflicts: 2nd Anglo-Chinese War; Crimean War
- Awards: VC CB CIE

Rear-Admiral John Bythesea VC CB CIE (/ˈbɪθsiː/; 15 June 1827 – 18 May 1906) was an officer of the Royal Navy. He was an English recipient of the Victoria Cross, the highest and most prestigious award for gallantry in the face of the enemy that can be awarded to British and Commonwealth forces. He was awarded the Victoria Cross for his actions in 1854 during the Crimean War. However, in 1872, he ruined his career when he put his battleship HMS Lord Clyde aground at Pantellaria, resulting in his dismissal from his ship; he was never employed at sea again.

== Early life ==
John Bythesea was born on 15 June 1827 in Freshford, Somerset, the son of Rev. George Bythesea.

He entered the Royal Navy in 1841, and was promoted to lieutenant on 12 June 1849.

On 22 June 1850, he was posted to the 46-gun screw-frigate HMS Arrogant commanded by Captain Robert Spencer Robinson, Lisbon. He stayed with Arrogant when she was recommissioned at Portsmouth by Captain Stephen Greville Fremantle on 27 September 1852. Fremantle was succeeded by Captain Hastings Yelverton on 24 October 1853. She served in the Baltic Sea in 1854 in the Crimean War.

He became a member of the Bath and County Club in 1861.

== Action for which he was awarded the Victoria Cross ==
On 9 August 1854, in the Baltic, Lieutenant Bythesea obtained permission to land on the island of Vårdö, Åland off Finland with a Swedish-speaking crewman Stoker William Johnstone, to intercept important despatches from the Czar which were being sent via Vårdö to Bomarsund. "They lay in wait for three days until five Russians arrived on 12 August with the postbags. Johnstone ambushed the men, at Bythesea's signal, attempting to throw a rope around the group whilst Bythesea provided cover with just one pistol. Two of the men dropped their bags and fled while the remaining three finally surrendered. Bythesea ordered the men back to their own boat and then forced them to row it back to Arrogant, with the mailbags."

Bythesea was personally presented with the Victoria Cross by Queen Victoria at the first VC investiture held at Hyde Park, London, on 26 June 1857.

== Career up to Lord Clyde ==
On 12 March 1855, Lieutenant Bythesea was appointed captain of the paddle gun-vessel HMS Locust and served in the Flying Squadron in the Baltic. On 10 May 1856 he was promoted to commander, and on 20 May, Lieutenant John Bousquet Field replaced him as captain of Locust.

On 4 March 1858, he took over as captain of the 17-gun screw-sloop HMS Cruizer (also spelled Cruiser) from Charles Fellowes. At the time, Cruizer was serving in the Far East and saw action in the 2nd Anglo-Chinese War. Cruizer paid off at Portsmouth on 1 May 1861.

On 15 May 1861, he was promoted to captain. In 1862, he served on the Commission to examine Canadian defences.

On 30 March 1863, he commissioned the 12-gun screw-corvette HMS Archer at Woolwich. Archer served on the West Africa Station. Bythesea was invalided out, and replaced by Captain Francis Marten on 12 April 1864.

From 1 April 1866, until 1867, he was carried on the books of the flagship of the North American Squadron, HMS Duncan, for special service as Naval Attache in Washington, D.C.

From 6 May 1867, until 29 November 1870 he was captain of the screw-frigate HMS Phoebe. Bythesea commanded her for the entire commission. She served first in the Channel squadron, then the West Indies, then joining the flying squadron at Bahia on 4 August 1869.

== Loss of HMS Lord Clyde ==
On 14 September 1871, he commissioned the battleship HMS Lord Clyde at Plymouth and took her out to the Mediterranean Fleet. In March 1872, Lord Clyde:

"was lying at Syracuse and received a wire from Malta to proceed at once to the help of a British steamer aground on the island of Pantellaria, on which service she got far worst aground herself. Anchors were laid out, coal jettisoned, guns, ammunition and stores hoisted over the side into small casters in the island hired on the spot, and everything possible done to lighten her, but she remained a fixture except to sway in the swell from the open sea, strain her back, and wrench off her sternpost, rudderpost and rudder. It took some time to summon help, as that was a full generation before the days of wireless telegraphy and Pantellaria had no cables; but an officer was dispatched by a passing steamer to Malta, where HMS Lord Warden was lying as flagship and came at once to pull her crippled sister off the floor and get her to bed. This proved an extremely difficult job even when she was afloat again, as she yawed about so violently without a rudder when in tow, as to pull the sister in charge all over the place. It took three days to conduct erring footsteps a distance that could ordinarily be covered in less than one, and all the while she was leaking at a steady rate of 2 feet per hour. On arrival at Malta she had to be docked with great care on account of the badly damaged state of her bottom; and the yard reported that it would take six months to repair."

The court-martial in April 1872 severely reprimanded Bythesea and the Navigating Officer, who were dismissed from their ship and neither of them were ever employed at sea again. Lord Clyde was never commissioned again.

== Marriage and retirement ==
Bythesea married firstly Helen Dunbar Brogden (née Milne) on 7 July 1866 at the British Legation in Brussels. His wife had formerly been married to the iron master James Brogden but in 1865 had been divorced for adultery. This marriage too ended in divorce in 1873, Bythesea also citing his wife's adultery. He married secondly Fanny Belinda Prior in 1874, His turn for promotion to the rank of Rear-Admiral came on 5 August 1877 but, because he did not have the requisite six years' sea time as a Captain, he was placed on the Retired List with the rank of Rear-Admiral.

He served as consulting naval officer to the Indian Government from 1874, until the Indian Navy was restructured in 1880. He was made a Companion of the Bath (CB) and a Companion of the Order of the Indian Empire (CIE) in 1878.

He died at South Kensington on 18 May 1906 and was buried at Bath Abbey Cemetery, Somerset.

== The medal ==
His VC is on display in the Lord Ashcroft Gallery at the Imperial War Museum, London.
