= Joseph Kellaway =

English seaman

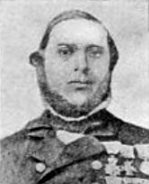
- Born: 1 September 1824; Kingston, Purbeck, Dorset, England
- Died: 2 October 1880 (aged 56); Chatham, Kent, England
- Burial place: Maidstone Road Cemetery, Chatham
- Military career
- Allegiance: United Kingdom
- Branch: Royal Navy
- Rank: Chief Boatswain
- Units: HMS Wrangler
- Conflicts: Crimean War
- Awards: Victoria Cross; Legion of Honour (France)

Joseph Kellaway VC (1 September 1824 – 2 October 1880) was an English recipient of the Victoria Cross, the highest and most prestigious award for gallantry in the face of the enemy that can be awarded to British and Commonwealth forces.

== Details ==
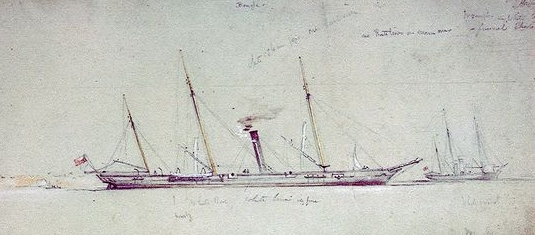
HMS Beagle with HMS Wrangler (right) by Sir Oswald Brierly, 1855

Kellaway was 30 years old, and a boatswain third class in the Royal Navy during the Crimean War when the following deed took place for which he was awarded the VC.

On 31 August 1855 in the Sea of Azov, Crimea, Boatswain Kellaway of HMS Wrangler, with the mate and three seamen, was put ashore to burn some boats, fishing stations and haystacks on the opposite side of a small lake. They had nearly reached the spot when they were ambushed by 50 Russians. One man fell into their hands, but Mr. Kellaway and the two other seamen had escaped when the mate accidentally fell. Mr. Kellaway immediately returned to help him, but they were surrounded by the enemy and notwithstanding a gallant resistance by Mr. Kellaway they were taken prisoner.

== Further information ==
He later achieved the rank of chief boatswain.
