= HMS Arrogant (1848) =

Frigate of the Royal Navy

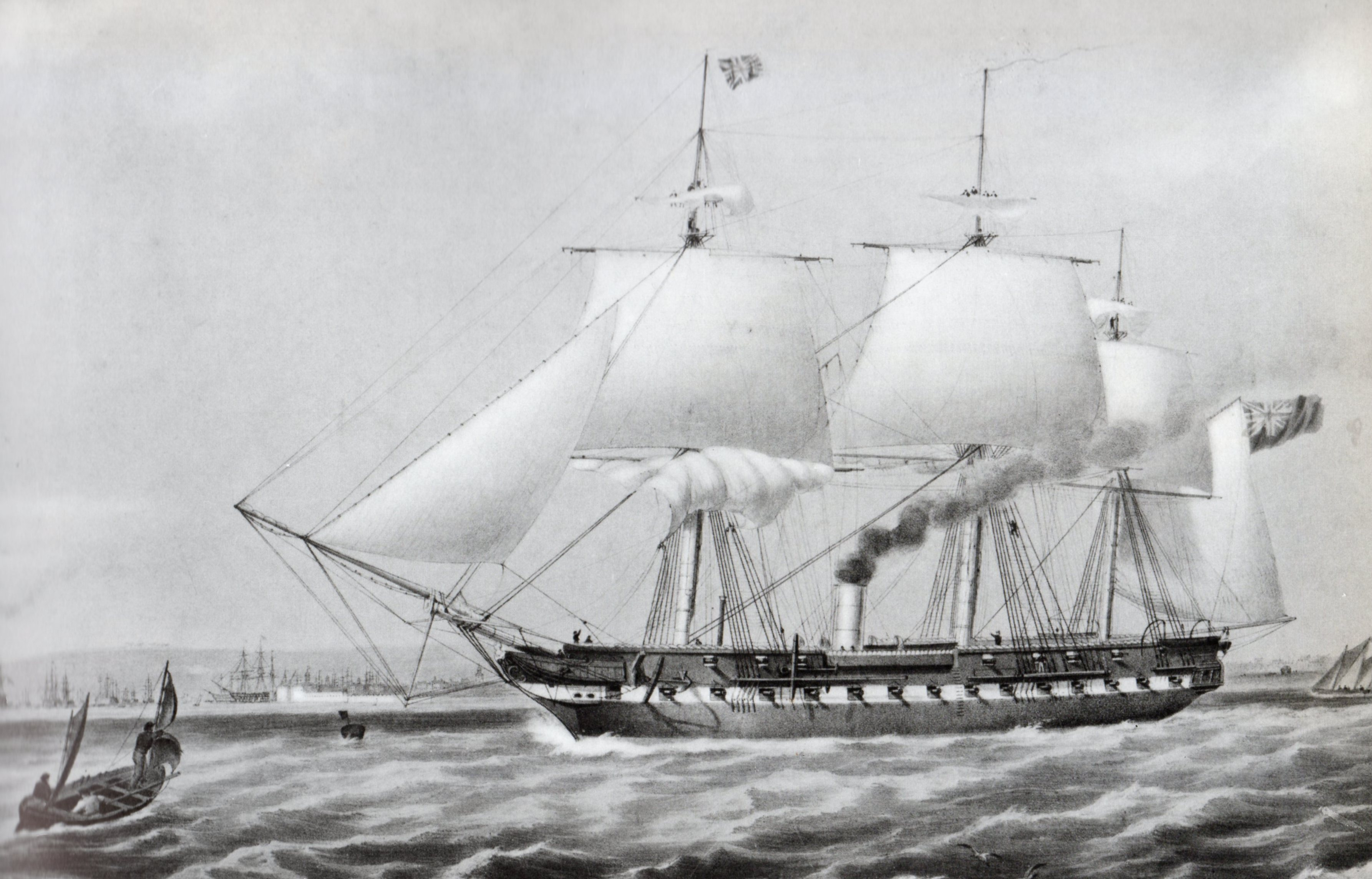
- HMS Arrogant

History

United Kingdom
- Name: Arrogant
- Ordered: 11 February 1845
- Builder: Portsmouth Dockyard
- Cost: £83,183
- Laid down: September 1845
- Launched: 5 April 1848
- Out of service: 1862
- Fate: Sold March 1867

General characteristics
- Displacement: 2690 tons
- Tons burthen: 1872 tons bm
- Length: 200 ft 0 in (61.0 m) (gundeck); 172 ft 9 in (52.7 m) (keel)
- Beam: 45 ft 8.75 in (13.9 m)
- Depth of hold: 15 ft 1 in (4.60 m)
- Propulsion: Screw
- Speed: 8.64 knots
- Complement: 450 men
- Armament: 46 guns comprising; Main deck: 12 × 8in (65cwt) shell + 16 × 32-pounder (56cwt); Upper deck: 2 × 68-pounder (95cwt) + 16 × 32-pounder (42cwt)

HMS Arrogant was an early wood screw frigate of the Royal Navy, launched in 1848 and sold in 1867. During the period of 1848–1850 she was commanded by Captain Robert FitzRoy.

In 1854 Arrogant was part of the fleet deployed to the Baltic Sea on the outbreak of the Crimean War, and served in that theatre until 1855. On 15 April 1854 Arrogant was one of a number of Royal Navy ships that captured the Russian brig Patrioten.

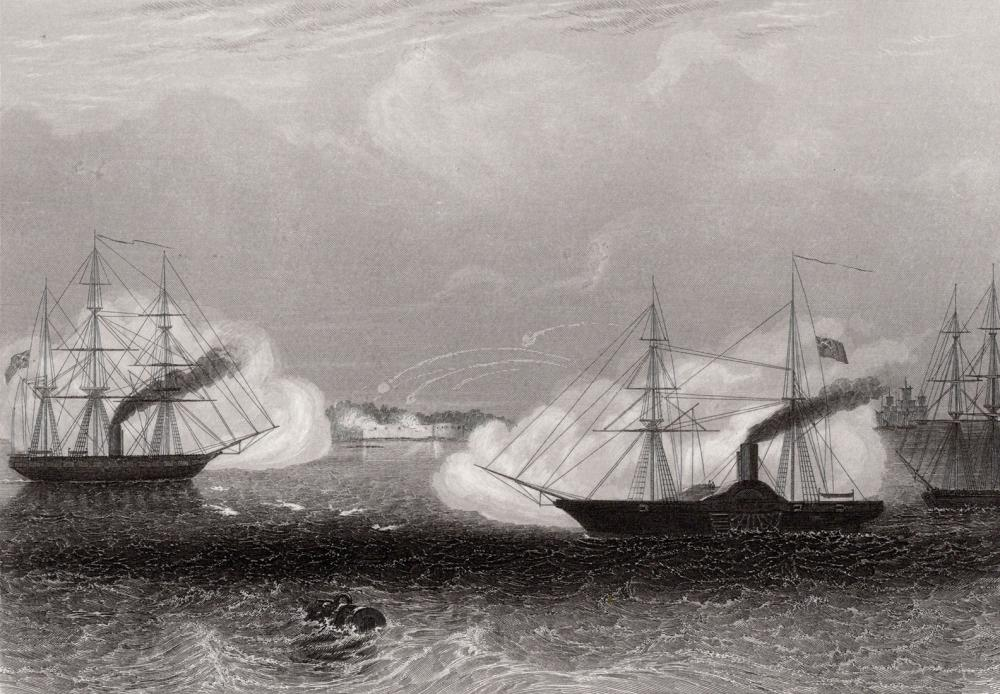
Gallant affair of the Hecla and Arrogant

Hecla and Arrogant cut out a Russian barque from under the batteries of Ekenäs on 20 May 1854. The Arrogant, anchoring off the batteries, kept up a furious cannonade, while the Hecla ran in, throwing shells on the enemy, and taking a barque in tow, steamed away with her.

Three of the ship's company, Lieutenant John Bythesea, Captain of the Mast George Ingouville and stoker William Johnstone won Victoria Crosses. Bythesea and Johnstone won theirs after they went ashore in one of the ship's boats on 9 August 1854, intercepted Russian soldiers carrying mailbags, and then forced the soldiers back to the ship along with the mailbags. Ingouville won his VC after heroically saving Arrogant's second cutter under heavy enemy fire off Viborg on 13 July 1855.

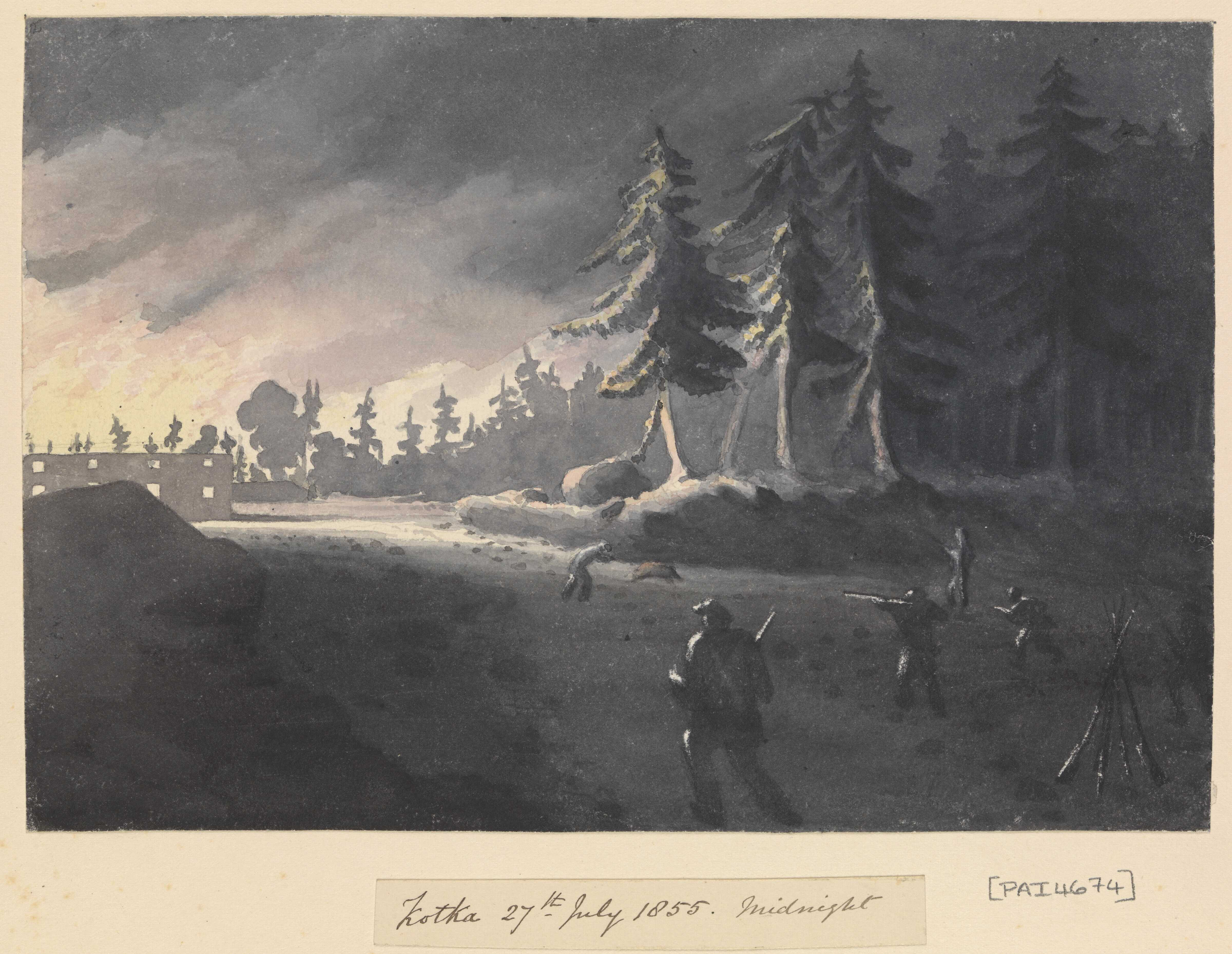
The parson and the pig, an incident at the burning of Kotka barracks, Finland, by Captain Yelverton of the Arrogant, burnt on the night of 26–27 July 1855

Later in the Crimean War, four vessels of the Royal Navy—Arrogant, Cossack, Magicienne, and Ruby—silenced the Russian batteries at a fort on Gogland on 21 July 1855, while the Anglo-French fleet went on to bombard Sveaborg before returning home.

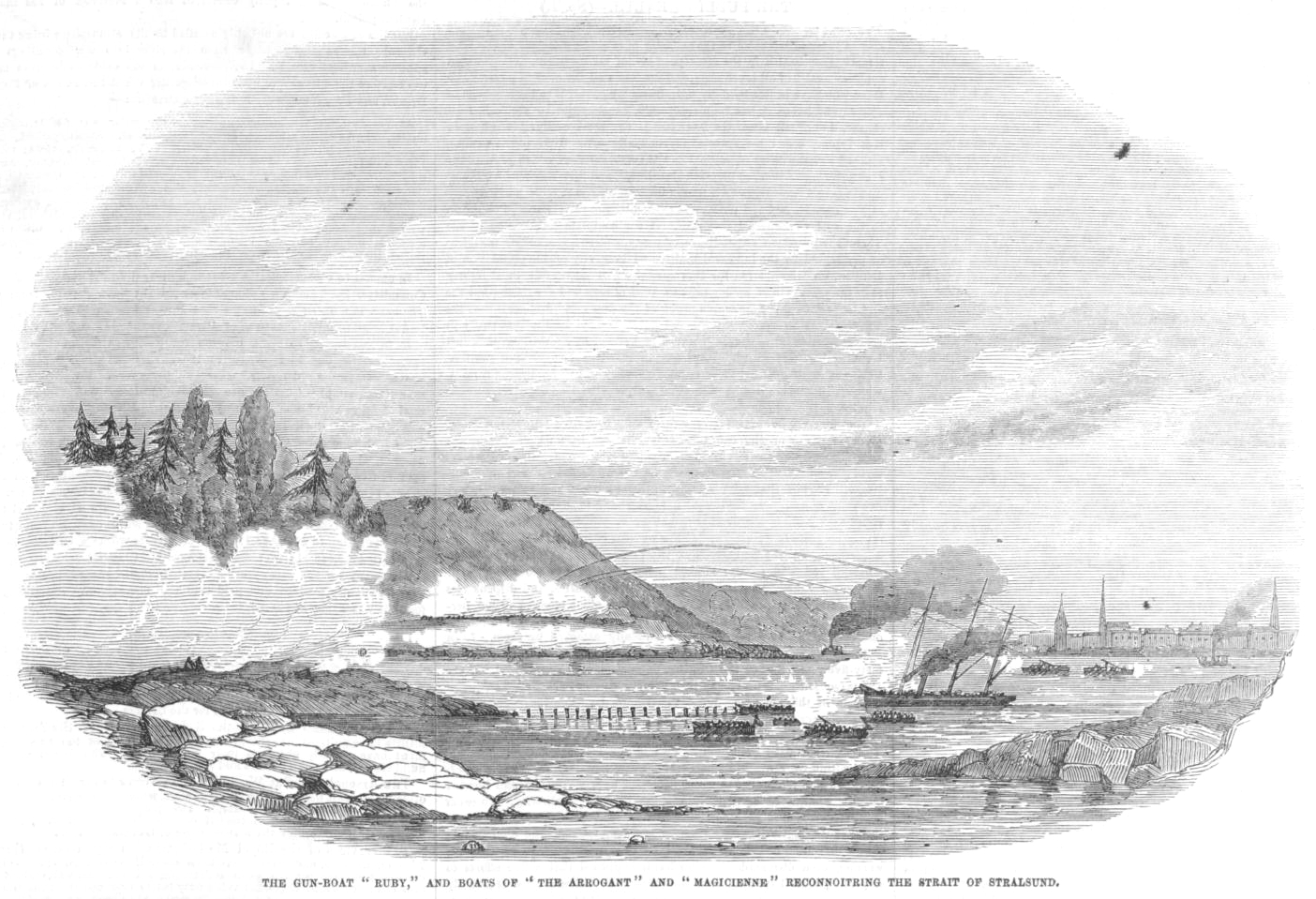
The Gun-Boat Ruby, and boats of the Arrogant and Magicienne reconnoitring the Strait of Stralsund, 1855

Arrogant was taken out of active service and fitted for Coast Guard duties in 1857. She was decommissioned in 1862 and was sold to be broken up in March 1867.

== Bibliography ==
- Lyon, David & Winfield, Rif: The Sail and Steam Navy List: All the Ships of the Royal Navy 1815-1889 Chatham Publishing, 2004. ISBN 1-86176-032-9.
