= George Dare Dowell =

Recipient of the Victoria Cross

George Dare Dowell VC
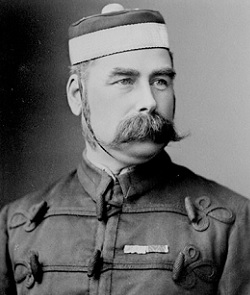
- Born: 15 February 1831; Fishbourne, West Sussex, England
- Died: 3 August 1910 (aged 79); Auckland, New Zealand
- Burial place: Purewa Cemetery, Auckland
- Military career
- Allegiance: United Kingdom
- Branch: Royal Marines
- Service years: 1849–1872
- Rank: Lieutenant Colonel
- Units: Royal Marine Artillery
- Conflicts: Crimean War
- Awards: Victoria Cross

George Dare Dowell, VC (15 February 1831 – 3 August 1910) was a Royal Marines officer and a recipient of the Victoria Cross, the highest award for gallantry in the face of the enemy that can be awarded to British and Commonwealth forces.

== Military career ==
Dowell was 24 years old, and a lieutenant in the Royal Marine Artillery, Royal Marines during the Crimean War when the following deed took place for which he was awarded the Victoria Cross (VC).

On 13 July 1855 at the Fort of Viborg in the Gulf of Finland, when an explosion occurred in one of the cutters of HMS Arrogant, Lieutenant Dowell, who was on board HMS Ruby, took three volunteers and went, under very heavy fire to the assistance of the cutter. He took up three of the crew, and having rescued the rest and also the Captain of the Mast (George Ingouville), he then towed the stricken boat out of enemy gun range.

Dowell later achieved the rank of brevet lieutenant colonel.

== Death and legacy ==
Dowell died on 3 August 1910 in Auckland, and is buried at Purewa Cemetery in the suburb of Meadowbank. He has an unusual gravestone. His wife, who died six weeks after him, is buried approximately 10 metres (33 ft) to the right of his grave and her gravestone is in the same style.

Dowell's Victoria Cross is displayed at the Royal Marines Museum in Southsea, England.
