= George Ingouville =

Recipient of the Victoria Cross

George Henry Ingouville
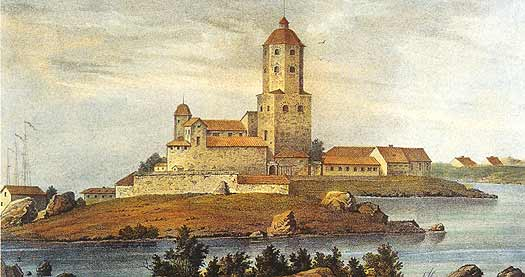
- Vyborg Castle in 1840
- Born: 7 October 1826; Saint Saviour, Jersey
- Died: 13 January 1869 (aged 42)
- Burial place: Buried at sea
- Military career
- Allegiance: United Kingdom
- Branch: Royal Navy
- Rank: Captain of the Mast
- Units: HMS Arrogant
- Conflicts: Crimean War
- Awards: Victoria Cross; Conspicuous Gallantry Medal

George Henry Ingouville, VC, CGM (7 October 1826 – 13 January 1869) was a sailor in the Royal Navy and a recipient of the Victoria Cross, the highest award for gallantry in the face of the enemy that can be awarded to British and Commonwealth forces.

== Victoria Cross ==
George Ingouville was born at St. Saviour, Jersey Channel Islands. He was 28 years old, and a Captain of the Mast in the Royal Navy during the Crimean War. On 13 July 1855 at the Fort of Viborg in the Gulf of Finland, while the boats of HMS Arrogant were engaged with the enemy, her second cutter was swamped by the blowing up of her magazine and drifted inshore under enemy guns. Captain of the Mast Ingouville, although wounded, jumped overboard, swam round to the boat's bows, took hold of the painter and tried to turn the cutter out to sea. A lieutenant of the Royal Marine Artillery (George Dare Dowell) came to his assistance, when with three volunteers, he took off the crew from the cutter, rescued Ingouville from the water and then towed the stricken boat out of gun range.

Ingouville Place in Saint Helier in Jersey, is named after him.

=== Citation ===
The citation reads:

George Ingouville, Captain of the Mast.

On the 13th of July, 1855, while the boats of the Arrogant were engaged with the enemy's gun-boats and batteries off Viborg, her second cutter was swamped by the blowing up of her magazine, and drifted under a battery. Notwithstanding that he was wounded in the arm, and that the boat was under a very heavy fire, Ingouville, without any order to do so, jumped overboard, caught hold of her painter, and saved her. (Despatch from Captain Yelverton, 18th November, 1855, and Rear-Admiral Honourable Sir B. T. Dundas, 12th December, 1855, No. 759.)

— London Gazette, 24 February 1857.

Ingouville's VC can be seen in the Maritime Museum on the New North Quay in St Helier, Jersey.
