= William Johnstone (VC) =

British Royal Navy stoker, recipient of the Victoria Cross (1823–1857)

William Johnstone VC
- Born: 6 August 1823; Ilmajoki, Grand Duchy of Finland, Russian Empire
- Died: 20 August 1857 (aged 34); At Sea
- Burial place: Buried at sea
- Military career
- Allegiance: United Kingdom
- Branch: Royal Navy
- Rank: Stoker
- Units: HMS Arrogant
- Conflicts: Crimean War
- Awards: Victoria Cross

William Johnstone VC (6 August 1823 – 20 August 1857) was a Royal Navy sailor and a recipient of the Victoria Cross, the highest award for gallantry in the face of the enemy that can be awarded to British and Commonwealth forces. He enlisted and served as John Johnstone.

He is listed as being born in Hanover, Germany according to his Royal Navy file, however he is now known to have been born Johan Fredric Lindroth, in the Vaasa district, Finland, on 6 August 1823. He served on four ships; the first was St. Vincent, an emigrant ship transporting people to Australia (1845-1849), followed by HMS Reynard which operated in the China Seas, fighting pirates and was shipwrecked near Pratas Island in the South China Sea on 31 May 1851. The whole crew survived the sinking when HMS Pilot rescued them. After that, he moved on to HMS Arrogant and then to HMS Brunswick.

== Victoria Cross ==
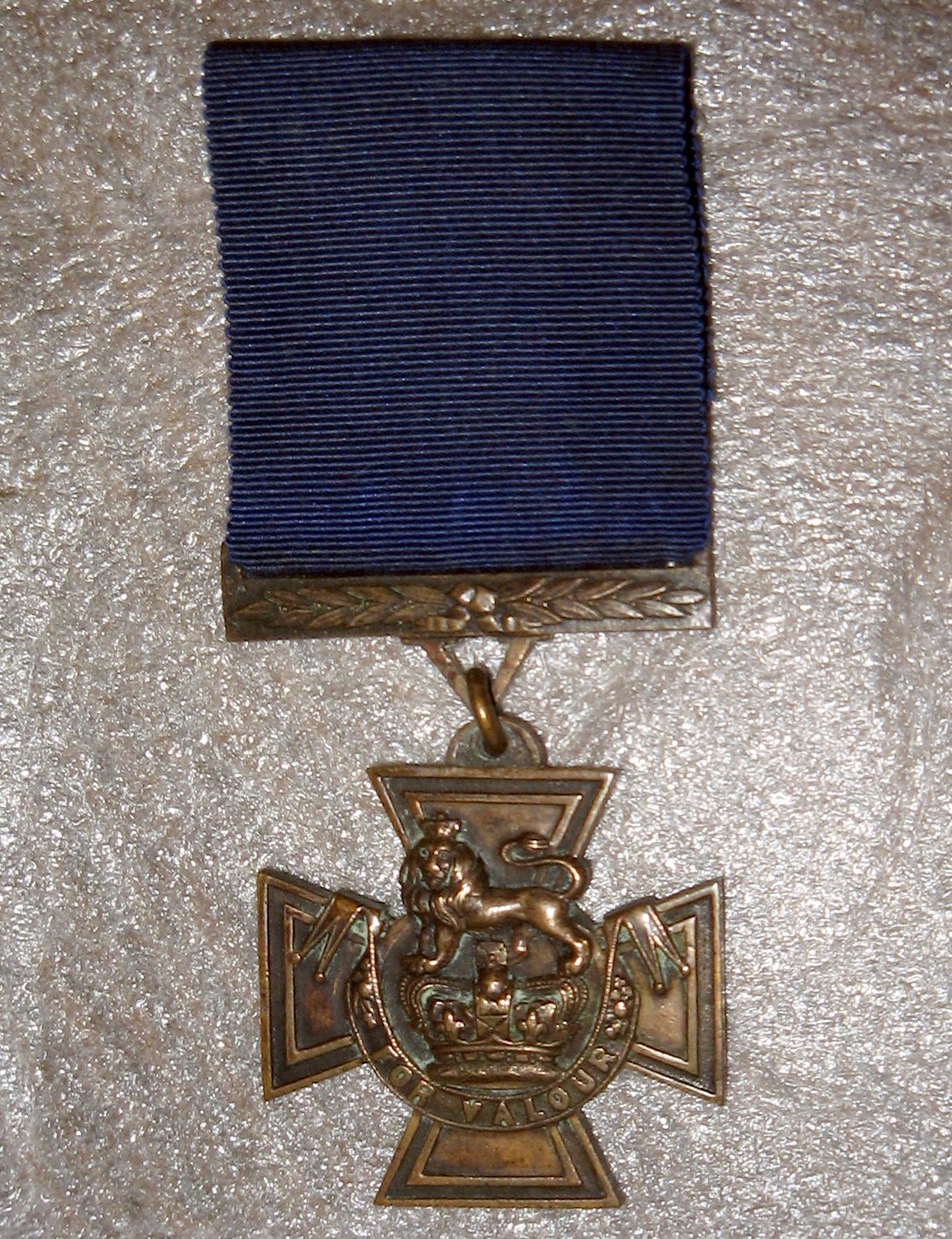
Johnstone's Victoria Cross

He was 31 years old, and a stoker in the Royal Navy during the Crimean War when the following deed took place for which he was awarded the Victoria Cross (VC).

On 9 August 1854 in the Baltic, Leading Stoker Johnstone and a Lieutenant (John Bythesea) from HMS Arrogant, landed on the island of Vårdö, Åland off Finland in order to intercept important despatches from the tsar which were being sent via Vårdö to Bomarsund. The two men spent two nights reconnoitring the island, being helped by a local farmer and his daughter to evade capture by the Russians and on 12 August when the despatches arrived, they ambushed the five Russians carrying them. Two of the couriers dropped their mail bags and ran, but the other three surrendered and were taken to the Arrogant. In this action the Officer and Leading Stoker were armed with just one pistol and a knife. Upon their return, the Commanders of both the English and French ships in the fleet were delighted.

Johnstone was not in England when Queen Victoria held the first VC investiture at Hyde Park, London, on 26 June 1857. The medal was sent for presentation to the Commanding Officer of HMS Brunswick, who returned it to the Admiralty on 16 October 1857, Johnstone having died nine weeks earlier. His widow was sent his Victoria Cross by registered post.

His RN records in the UK National Archives show he was a Leading Stoker until 24 May 1856 when he was made Ship's Cook until his death. It is worth noting that ship's cooks were often older, retired or injured seamen. As Johnstone was aged 33, it might be assumed that he had been injured.

== Birth ==
Although John Johnson, alias William Johnstone, claimed to be born at Hanover, he was actually born somewhere near Kristinestad, Finland. In 2022, Finnish researchers discovered a Russian police report on the 1854 incident which resulted in Johnstone being awarded the Victoria Cross. In the report, a witness mentioned in passing that one of the Englishmen (i.e. Johnstone) spoke poor Swedish and claimed to be from Kristinestad in Finland, but had lived in England since his youth. This discovery was reported by Lord Michael Ashcroft, owner of the world's largest collection of VCs, in 2024.

Further research revealed a candidate for the birth of the VC holder. Johan Fredric Lindroth is listed as being born on 6 August 1823 and arriving in Kristinestad in 1837 aged fourteen from a nearby village, Ilmola or Ilmajoki, after his father, a shoemaker with the same name, had died. His name occurred a second time in this list in 1841, registered as "gone". After that, he vanished from Finnish records, at about the same time as John Johnson, born on the same day, started his career as a British seaman. DNA matches between descendants of William Johnstone and the Lindroth family confirmed this hypothesis.

== Marriage ==
His naval pay records show that he made provision for his wife Eliza. A newspaper report on the death of William Johnstone VC recorded that he left a wife and three children.

He married Eliza Littlefield, as John Johnson, on 2 February 1847, at Portsmouth, Hampshire. In the 1861 England Census, widow Eliza Johnson was at Alverstoke, Hampshire, with her parents and her three children.

Eliza married two more times, and died as Eliza Treen, aged 90, on 13 October 1919 at Southsea, Hampshire, England.

== Death ==
He died on 20 August 1857 from self-inflicted wounds while serving aboard HMS Brunswick in the West Indies. He cut his own throat after attacking another man with a knife and felt the remorse of his actions, taking his own life by the same knife. He was then buried at sea in the Saint Vincent Passage, West Indies.

William Johnstone's medal was sold after his death and became part of a collection which on the death of the new owner, was gifted to and displayed in the Natural History Museum of Los Angeles County.

A pencil sketch exists in the Imperial War Museum's catalogues pertaining to information on Victoria Cross winners.
