= Daubeney =

Daubeney may refer to:

== People ==
- Daubeney Turberville (1612–1696), English physician
- Henry Daubeney (cricketer) (1812–1850), English cricketer
- Henry Daubeney, 1st Earl of Bridgewater (1493–1548), English peer
- Henry Charles Barnston Daubeney (1810–1903), British Army officer
- Giles Daubeney, 1st Baron Daubeney (1451–1508), English soldier
- Sir Giles Daubeney (1395–1446), English knight

== Other uses ==
- Daubeney Academy, secondary school in England
