= Henry Daubeney =

Henry Daubeney may refer to:

- Henry Daubeney (cricketer) (1812–1850), English cricketer and clergyman
- Henry Daubeney, 1st Earl of Bridgewater (1493–1548)
- Sir Henry Charles Barnston Daubeney (1810–1903), British Army officer
