= 57th Regiment of Foot (disambiguation) =

57th Regiment of Foot may refer to:

- 55th (Westmoreland) Regiment of Foot, 57th Regiment of Foot, raised in 1755 and renumbered as the 55th in 1756
- 57th (West Middlesex) Regiment of Foot, raised in 1755 as the 59th and renumbered as the 57th in 1756
