= 1884 Birthday Honours =

Appointments by Queen Victoria

The 1884 Birthday Honours were appointments by Queen Victoria to various orders and honours to reward and highlight good works by citizens of the British Empire. The appointments were made to celebrate the official birthday of the Queen, and were published in The London Gazette in May and June 1884.

The recipients of honours are displayed here as they were styled before their new honour, and arranged by honour, with classes (Knight, Knight Grand Cross, etc.) and then divisions (Military, Civil, etc.) as appropriate.

== United Kingdom and British Empire ==
=== Baron ===
- James, Earl of Seafield, by the name, style, and title of Baron Strathspey, of. Strathspey, in the counties of Inverness and Moray

=== Knight Bachelor ===
- Richard Dickeson, late Mayor of Dover
- Frederick William Burton FSA Director of the National Gallery of London
- Samuel Davenport, of South Australia

=== The Most Honourable Order of the Bath ===
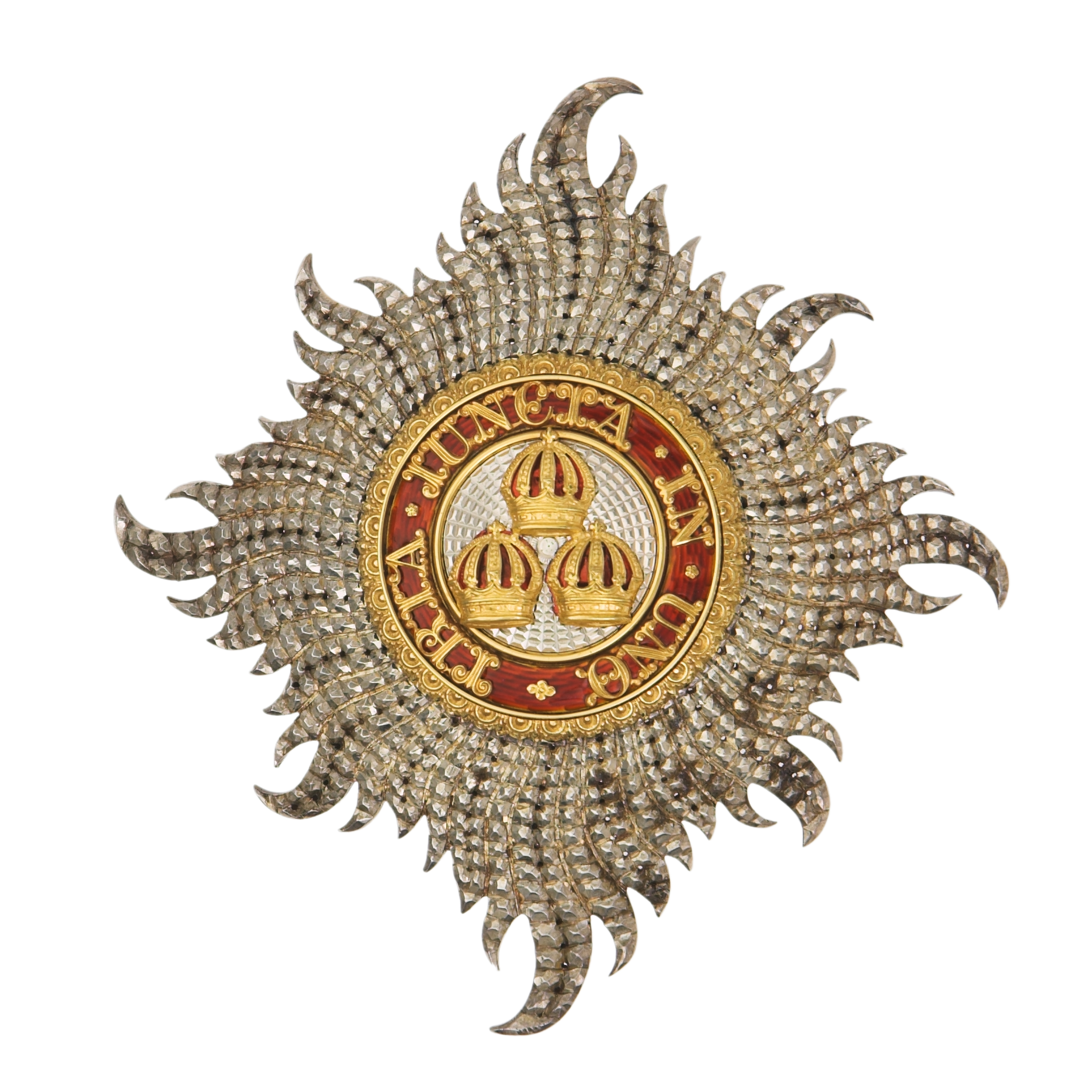
Civilian star of the Knight Grand Cross of the Order of the Bath

==== Knight Grand Cross of the Order of the Bath (GCB) ====
===== Military Division =====
Army

- General Sir Charles William Dunbar Staveley KCB
- General Sir Collingwood Dickson KCB VC
- General Sir Arthur Borton GCMG KCB
- General Sir Henry Charles Barnston Daubeney KCB
- General Sir James Brind KCB

==== Knight Commander of the Order of the Bath (KCB) ====
===== Military Division =====
Royal Navy

- Admiral Alfred Phillipps Ryder
- Vice-Admiral George Ommanney Willes CB

Army

- Lieutenant-General Frederick Charles Arthur Stephenson CB
- Colonel Herbert Stewart CB Aide-de-Camp to the Queen

===== Civil Division =====
- The Honourable Spencer Cecil Brabazon Ponsonby-Fane CB Comptroller of Accounts, Lord Chamberlain's Department
- Henry Wentworth Acland CB Regius Professor of Medicine in the University of Oxford

==== Companion of the Order of the Bath (CB) ====
===== Military Division =====
Royal Navy

- Captain Hilary Gustavus Andoe
- Captain Ernest Neville Rolfe

Army

- Major-General John Davis
- Colonel Edward Alexander Wood, 10th Hussars
- Colonel Barnes Slyfield Robinson, Princess Victoria's' (Royal Irish Fusiliers)
- Colonel Cornelius Francis Clery
- Brigade Surgeon Edmund Greswold McDowell, Army Medical Department
- Lieutenant-Colonel William Green, the Black Watch (Royal Highlanders)
- Lieutenant-Colonel William Byam, York and Lancaster Regiment
- Lieutenant-Colonel Arthur George Webster, 19th Hussars
- Lieutenant-Colonel John Charles Ardagh CB (Civil), Royal Engineers
- Lieutenant-Colonel Percy Harry Stanley Barrow CMG 19th Hussars
- Assistant Commissary-General Robert Arthur

===== Civil Division =====
- The Honourable William Nassau Jocelyn, Her Majesty's Chargé d'Affaires at Darmstadt
- John Gardner Dillman Engleheart, Clerk of the Council cf the Ducliy of Lancaster
- Francis Mowatt, Principal Clerk in Her Majesty's Treasury

=== The Most Exalted Order of the Star of India ===
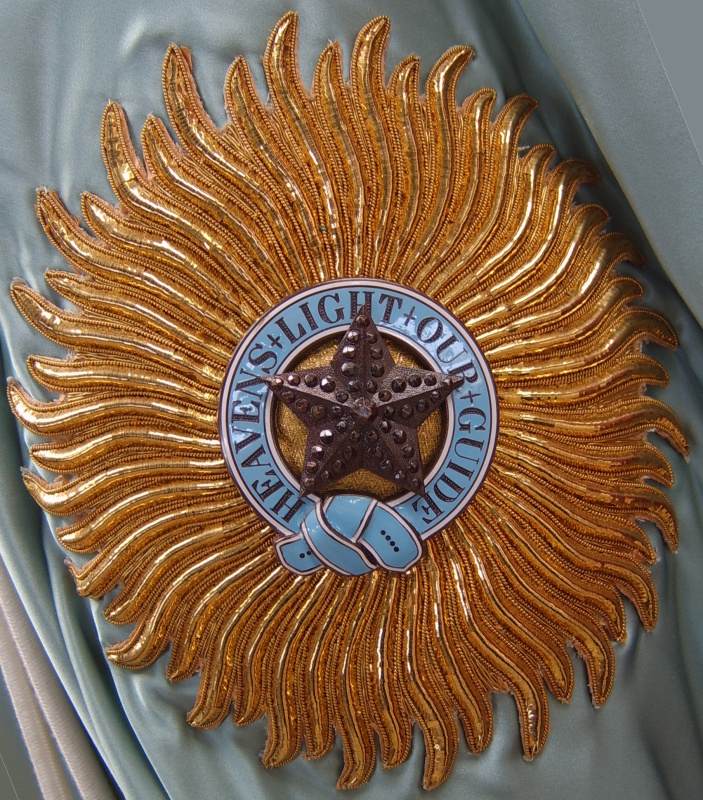
Star of a Knight Grand Commander of the Most Exalted Order of the Star of India

==== Knight Grand Commander (GCSI) ====
- His Highness Chama Rajendra Wadeir, Maharajah of Mysore

==== Companion (CSI) ====
- Sir Jamsetjee Jeejeebhoy Bt Additional Member of the Council of the Governor of Bombay for making Laws and Regulations
- Charles Gonne, Bombay Civil Service, Chief Secretary to the Government of Bombay, Additional Member of the Council of the Governor of Bombay for making Laws and Regulations
- William Wilson Hunter CIE Bengal Civil Service, Director-General of Statistics to the Government of India, Additional Member of the Council of the Viceroy and Governor-General of India for making Laws and Regulations
- Colonel Robert Murray, Bengal Staff Corps, late Director-General of Telegraphs to the Government of India

=== The Most Distinguished Order of Saint Michael and Saint George ===
Star of the Order of Saint Michael and Saint George

==== Knight Grand Cross of the Order of St Michael and St George (GCMG) ====
- Sir Robert Richard Torrens KCMG
- Sir Alfred Stephen KCMG CB formerly Chief Justice of New South Wales, now Lieutenant-Governor of that Colony

==== Knight Commander of the Order of St Michael and St George (KCMG) ====
- Thomas Charles Scanlen, late First Minister of the Cape of Good Hope
- Colonel William Crossman CMG Royal Engineers, one of Her Majesty's Commissioners appointed in 1882 to inquire into the Revenue and Expenditure, &c., of certain of the West Indian Colonies
- Frederick Napier Broome CMG Governor of Western Australia
- Arthur Elibank Havelock CMG Governor of the West Africa Settlements

==== Companion of the Order of St Michael and St George (CMG) ====
- Colonel Charles John Moysey, Royal Engineers, for services rendered in connection with South Africa
- John Glasgow Grant, formerly Speaker of the House of Assembly and Member of the Legislative Council of the Island of Barbados
- Edward Barnett Anderson Taylor, Colonial Secretary of the Bahama Islands and Administrator of the Government in the absence of the Governor
- Augustus John Adderley, for many years Member of the Legislature of the Bahama Islands, and Commissioner for the Bahamas at the International Fisheries Exhibition, 1883
- George Smyth Baden-Powell, one of Her Majesty's Commissioners appointed in 1882 to inquire into the Revenue and Expenditure, &c., of certain of the West Indian Colonies
- Frederick Charles Heidenstam, Chief Medical Officer of the Government of Cyprus
- William Crofton Twynam, Government Agent, Northern Province, Ceylon
- William Alexander Pickering, Protector of Chinese in the Straits Settlements

=== The Most Eminent Order of the Indian Empire ===
==== Companion (CIE) ====
- Alfred Woodley Croft, Director of Public Instruction, Bengal
- The Reverend William Miller, Principal of the Christian College, Madras
- Kashinath Trimbak Telang, Barrister-at-Law, Bombay
- Benjamin Lewis Rice, Director of Public Instruction, Mysore and Coorg
- Captain George O'Brien Theodore Carew (late Indian Navy), Deputy-Director of Indian Marine
- Sheikh Shuruf-ud-din, Raees of Sheikhupur
- Rai Bahadur Kanai Lai Dé
- Colonel Charles Edward Stewart, Bengal Staff Corps, employed on a special mission on the Perso-Afghan frontier
- Durga Charan Laha, late Member of the Council of the Viceroy and Governor-General of India for making Laws and Regulations
- Edward Thomas, Bengal Civil Service (Retired)
