= Thomas Beach (VC) =

Recipient of the Victoria Cross

Thomas Beach VC
- Born: 24 January 1824; Dundee, Scotland
- Died: 24 August 1864 (aged 40); Dundee, Scotland
- Burial place: Eastern Necropolis, Dundee
- Military career
- Allegiance: United Kingdom
- Branch: British Army
- Service years: 1840–1863
- Rank: Private
- Units: 92nd Regiment of Foot; 55th Regiment of Foot (att'd)
- Conflicts: Crimean War
- Awards: Victoria Cross

Thomas Beach VC (24 January 1824 – 24 August 1864) was a British Army soldier and a Scottish recipient of the Victoria Cross, the highest award for gallantry in the face of the enemy that can be awarded to British and Commonwealth forces. Beach suffered from severe alcoholism later in life. He died due to his alcoholism at the age of 40.

== Military service ==
Beach joined the British Army at the age of sixteen, being assigned to the 92nd Regiment of Foot (Gordon Highlanders) on 30 April 1840. He was posted to a variety of locations, including the West Indies and the Greek Isles. When the Crimean War broke out in 1854, his regiment was posted to Gibraltar as a garrison force. Beach volunteered to be seconded to another unit which was going to Crimea, and he was placed with the 55th Regiment of Foot.

It was in Crimea that he conducted himself in a manner that would later result in him being awarded the Victoria Cross for gallantry in the face of the enemy. His medal citation reads:

On 5 November 1854 at the Battle of Inkerman, Crimea, when on piquet duty, Private Beach attacked several Russians who were plundering Lieut.-Colonel Carpenter, 41st Regiment, who was lying wounded on the ground. He killed two of the Russians, and protected Lieut.-Colonel Carpenter until the arrival of some men of the 41st Regiment."

Although the official citation does not specify the exact number of opposing soldiers, Beach held off and fought a total of 5 Russians, with 2 of the opposing side killed.

It was the first Victoria Cross to be awarded to a member of the regiment. Alongside Major Frederick Cockayne Elton, Beach was presented with the VC by General Ferguson on 20 July 1857.

In addition to the Victoria Cross, during his time in the military he was awarded two good conduct medals. However he was also placed 21 times in the regimental defaulters book and was twice tried by court martial. The 1861 census of England, Wales and Scotland placed him living in Perth, Scotland.

== Later life and legacy ==
After leaving the army in June 1863 following 23 years of service, including seven and a half years overseas, he became a railway labourer. Less than a year later he had died from the effects of alcohol poisoning in the Dundee Royal Infirmary.

Beach was buried in a pauper's grave somewhere in the Eastern Necropolis in Dundee. The exact location of the burial is unknown due to the number of mass graves in that area. On 17 May 2003, a bench dedicated to him was placed in Necropolis, alongside a bench devoted to fellow Victoria Cross holder Peter Grant, who is also buried somewhere in the area in a similar grave. On 20 October 2006, a $1.50 stamp was issued in Kiribati commemorating Beach's Victoria Cross action. A drawing of it which had previously appeared in the Illustrated London News was used.

His medal is held at the Sheesh Mahal fort in Lahore, Pakistan. It forms part of a collection which was gathered by Bhupinder Singh of Patiala during the 1920s.
