= Royal Hampshire Regiment =

Hampshire Regiment Royal Hampshire Regiment
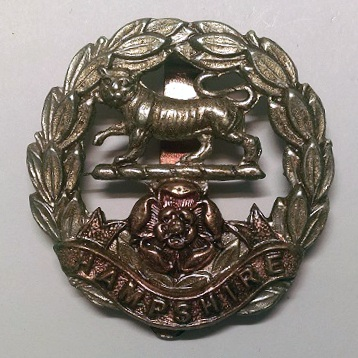
- Cap badge of the Hampshires
- Active: 1881–1992
- Country: United Kingdom
- Branch: British Army
- Type: Infantry
- Role: Line infantry
- Size: 1–2 Regular battalions 1 Militia and Special Reserve Battalion; Up to 6 Territorial and Volunteer battalions Up to 27 Hostilities-only battalions
- Part of: Prince of Wales's Division
- RHQ: Lower Barracks, Winchester
- Nickname: "The Hampshire Tigers"
- Colors: Yellow facings from 1904. Adopted from the uniform of the 37th Regiment of foot
- March: Quick – The Farmer's Boy

The Hampshire Regiment was a line infantry regiment of the British Army, created as part of the Childers Reforms in 1881 by the amalgamation of the 37th (North Hampshire) Regiment of Foot and the 67th (South Hampshire) Regiment of Foot. The regiment existed continuously for 111 years and served in the Second Boer War, World War I and World War II. An Army Order of the 28 November 1946 stated, due to distinguished service in the Second World War, the regiment would be re-titled as the Royal Hampshire Regiment.

On 9 September 1992, after over 111 years' service, the Royal Hampshire Regiment was amalgamated with the Queen's Regiment to form a new large regiment, the Princess of Wales's Royal Regiment, which continues the traditions of the Royal Hampshires.

== History ==
=== Formation and antecedents ===
The Hampshire Regiment was formed on 1 July 1881 under the Childers reforms from the merger of the 37th (North Hampshire) Regiment of Foot and the 67th (South Hampshire) Regiment of Foot along with the militia and rifle volunteers of the county of Hampshire. As part of the formation of the regiment, the following Volunteer Force and Militia units were placed under command of the regiment:

- 3rd (Hampshire Militia) Battalion based in Winchester
- [4th] 1st Volunteer Battalion based in Winchester, former 1st Hampshire Rifle Volunteers
- [5th] 2nd Volunteer Battalion based in Southampton, former 2nd Hampshire Rifle Volunteers
- [6th] 3rd Volunteer Battalion based in Portsmouth, former 3rd Hampshire Rifle Volunteers
- [7th] 4th Volunteer Battalion based in Newport, former 1st Isle of Wight Rifle Volunteers

=== Second Boer War ===
At the turn of the 20th century, there were two regular battalions of the regiment. The 1st battalion was stationed at Malta from 1884, then transferred to British India where it had various postings. In early 1903 the battalion transferred from Lucknow to Aden. In April 1904 three companies were attached to the Royal Navy and saw service in the Dervish War. Landing on the Somali coast, they served alongside a naval detachment that stormed and captured the forts at Illig.

The 2nd Battalion was deployed to South Africa as reinforcement for the British Army during the Second Boer War in January 1900, and took part in an action at Karee Siding on 29 March 1900, when one officer and 11 troops died. The battalion served in South Africa throughout the war, which ended in June 1902 with the Peace of Vereeniging. They returned home three months later, arriving in late September 1902, and a few days after their return was entertained to a large celebratory banquet by the Mayor of Portsmouth.

A third militia battalion was formed from the former Hampshire Militia, with headquarters in Winchester. The battalion was embodied in January 1900 for service in South Africa, and disembodied in December the same year. A Volunteer battalion was also formed to serve in South Africa. Men from this battalion were involved in the worst train accident during the war, near Barberton, on 30 March 1902. Following the accident, the battalion returned to the United Kingdom, arriving at Southampton in May 1902.

In 1908, the Volunteers and Militia were reorganised nationally, with the former becoming the Territorial Force and the latter the Special Reserve; the regiment now had one Reserve battalion and five Territorial battalions.

=== First World War ===
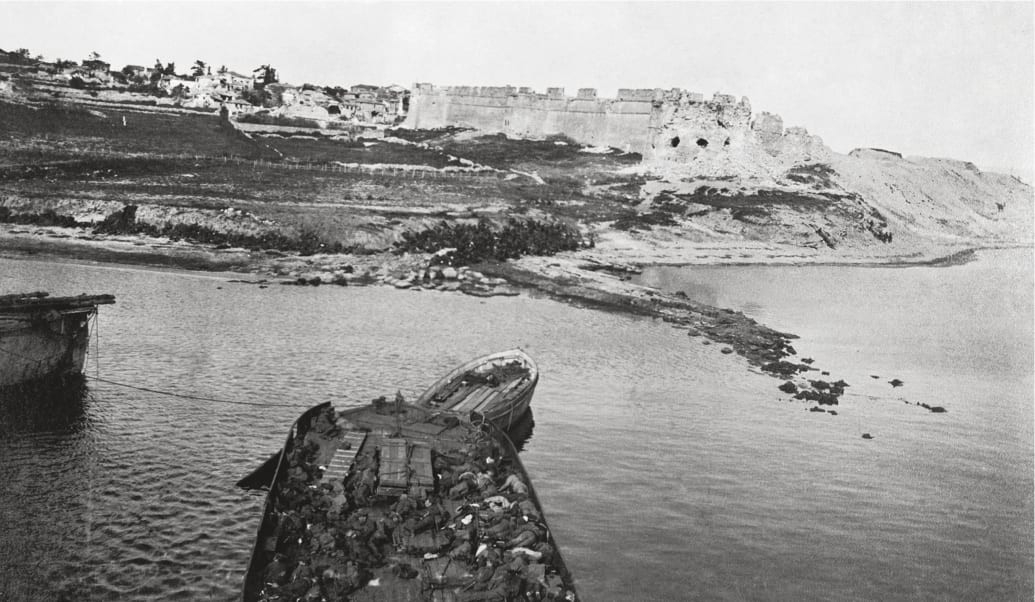
The SS River Clyde holds dead of the Hampshire Regiment who were killed while attempting to get ashore at Sedd el Bahr during the Gallipoli campaign.

During the First World War, the regiment expanded to 34 battalions. By the end of the First World War, the Hampshire Regiment had lost 7,580 officers and men killed in action.

==== Regular Army ====
The 1st Battalion was a Regular Army unit stationed in Colchester on the outbreak of war in August 1914. The battalion was assigned to the 11th Brigade, 4th Division. With the division, the battalion joined the British Expeditionary Force and was sent overseas to France in August 1914, landing at Le Havre on 23 August. The 1st Battalion saw its first combat against the German Army at Le Cateau. The battalion served on the Western Front for the rest of the war, participating in many battles in 1914 alone such as the First Battle of the Marne, the First Battle of the Aisne, and the Battle of Messines. In 1914, on Christmas Day, men of the 1st Battalion participated in the legendary Christmas Truce of 1914 where British and German soldiers fraternised in No man's land. In 1915, the battalion took part in the Second Battle of Ypres, famous for its use of poison gas. In 1916 it fought at Albert and Le Transloy, which was part of the larger Somme offensive.

The 2nd Battalion was also a Regular Army battalion that was serving in India at the outbreak of war and arrived in England on 22 December 1914. In early 1915, the battalion became part of the 88th Brigade, assigned to the 29th Division. The 2nd Battalion took part in the Battle of Gallipoli when engaged in the fatal Landing at Cape Helles in April 1915 and fought in the Battle of Krithia. In 1916, the 2nd Battalion was evacuated to Alexandria due to a mixture of heavy casualties from combat, disease and the terrible weather conditions. In March 1916, the battalion was sent to France and would serve on the Western Front for the rest of the war, participating in the battle of Albert and Le Transloy rides, alongside the 1st Battalion.

==== Territorial Force ====
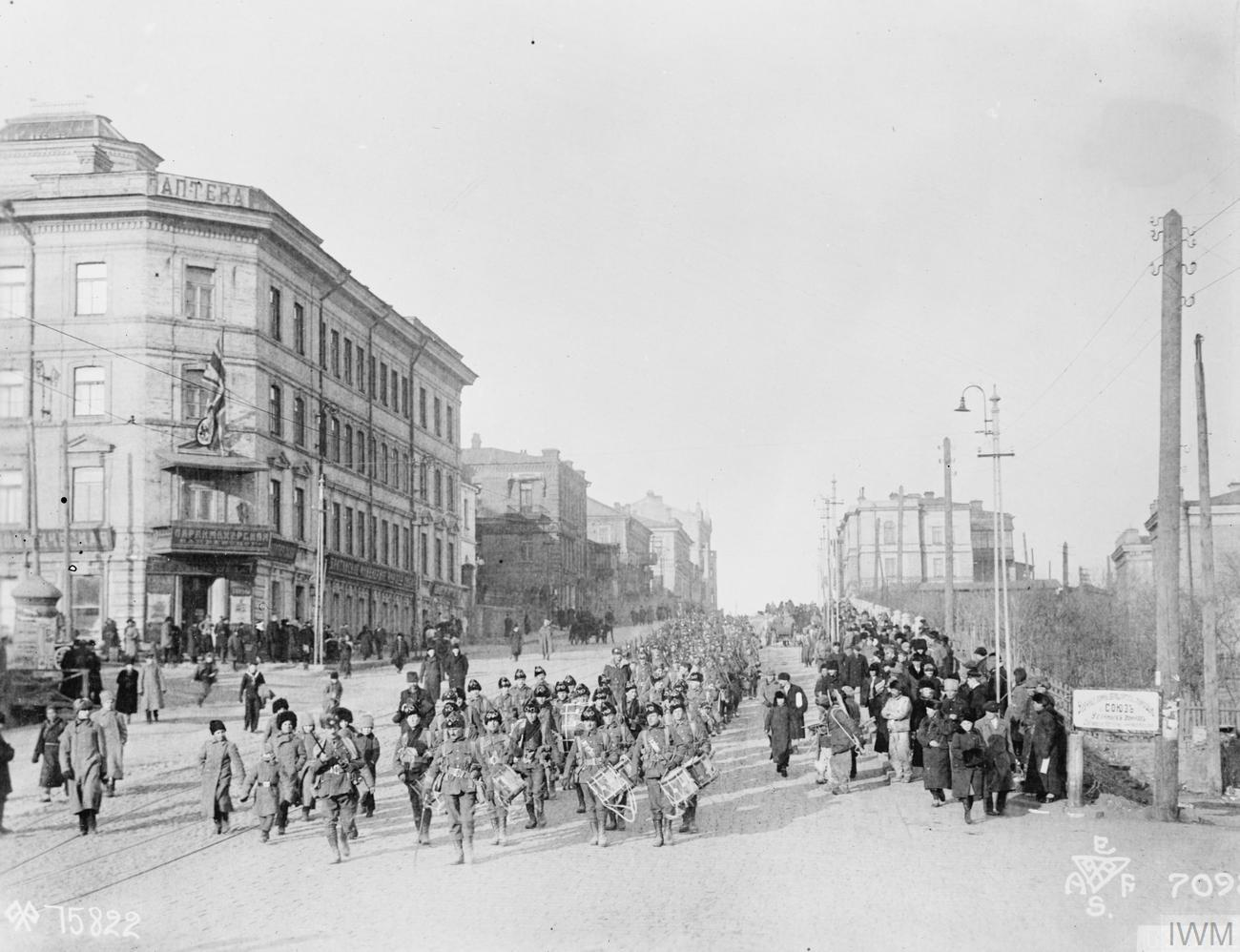
Men of the 1/9th Battalion, Hampshire Regiment leaving Vladivostock for Omsk, 1918.

The 1/4th Battalion landed at Karachi in India in November 1914 as part of the 4th (Rawalpindi) Brigade in the 2nd (Rawalpindi) Division before moving to Basra in March 1915: it remained in Mesopotamia and Persia for the rest of the war. The 1/5th Battalion landed at Karachi in India in November 1914: it remained in India for the rest of the war. The 1/6th (Duke of Connaught's Own) Battalion landed at Karachi in India in November 1914: it remained in India for the rest of the war. The 1/7th Battalion landed at Karachi in India in November 1914: it remained in India until January 1918 when it moved to Aden. The 1/8th (Isle of Wight Rifles, Princess Beatrice's) Battalion landed at Suvla Bay in Gallipoli as part of the 163rd Brigade in the 54th (East Anglian) Division on 9 August 1915 and, having been evacuated from Gallipoli in December 1915, moved to Egypt and then to Palestine. The 1/9th (Cyclist) Battalion sailed for India in February 1916 and then to Vladivostok in October 1918. The 2/4th Battalion sailed for India in December 1914 as part of 2/1st Hampshire Brigade in the 2nd Wessex Division and then sailed for Egypt in April 1917 and to France in May 1918. The 2/5th Battalion sailed for India in December 1914 as part of 2/1st Hampshire Brigade in the 2nd Wessex Division and then sailed for Egypt in April 1917 before being disbanded in Palestine in August 1918. The 2/7th Battalion sailed for India in December 1914 as part of 2/1st Hampshire Brigade in the 2nd Wessex Division and then moved to Mesopotamia in September 1917.

==== New Armies ====
The 10th (Service) Battalion landed at Gallipoli in August 1915 and was then transferred to Salonika in October 1915. The 11th (Service) Battalion (Pioneers) landed at Le Havre in December 1915. The 12th (Service) Battalion landed in France in September 1915, but moved to Salonika in November 1915. The 13th (Service) Battalion was converted into the 13th (Reserve) Battalion and remained in the UK training reinforcements for the service battalions. The 14th (Service) Battalion (1st Portsmouth) landed at Le Havre in March 1916. The 15th (Service) Battalion (2nd Portsmouth) landed in France in May 1916.

=== Irish War of Independence ===
The 2nd Battalion was sent to Ireland to fight the Irish Republican Army during the Irish War of Independence. On 20 February 1921, soldiers from the battalion took part in the Clonmult ambush during which the IRA suffered significant losses. (Note: The author of the Regimental history, David Scott Daniell, commented on the action that "like all the Irish operations, it was hateful to the British troops".)On 31 May 1921, seven soldiers, all with the band of the 2nd Battalion, Hampshire Regiment were on their way to the rifle range at Youghal County Cork when a road mine exploded under the truck they were travelling in. Three soldiers were killed outright, while a further four died later from their wounds.

=== Second World War ===
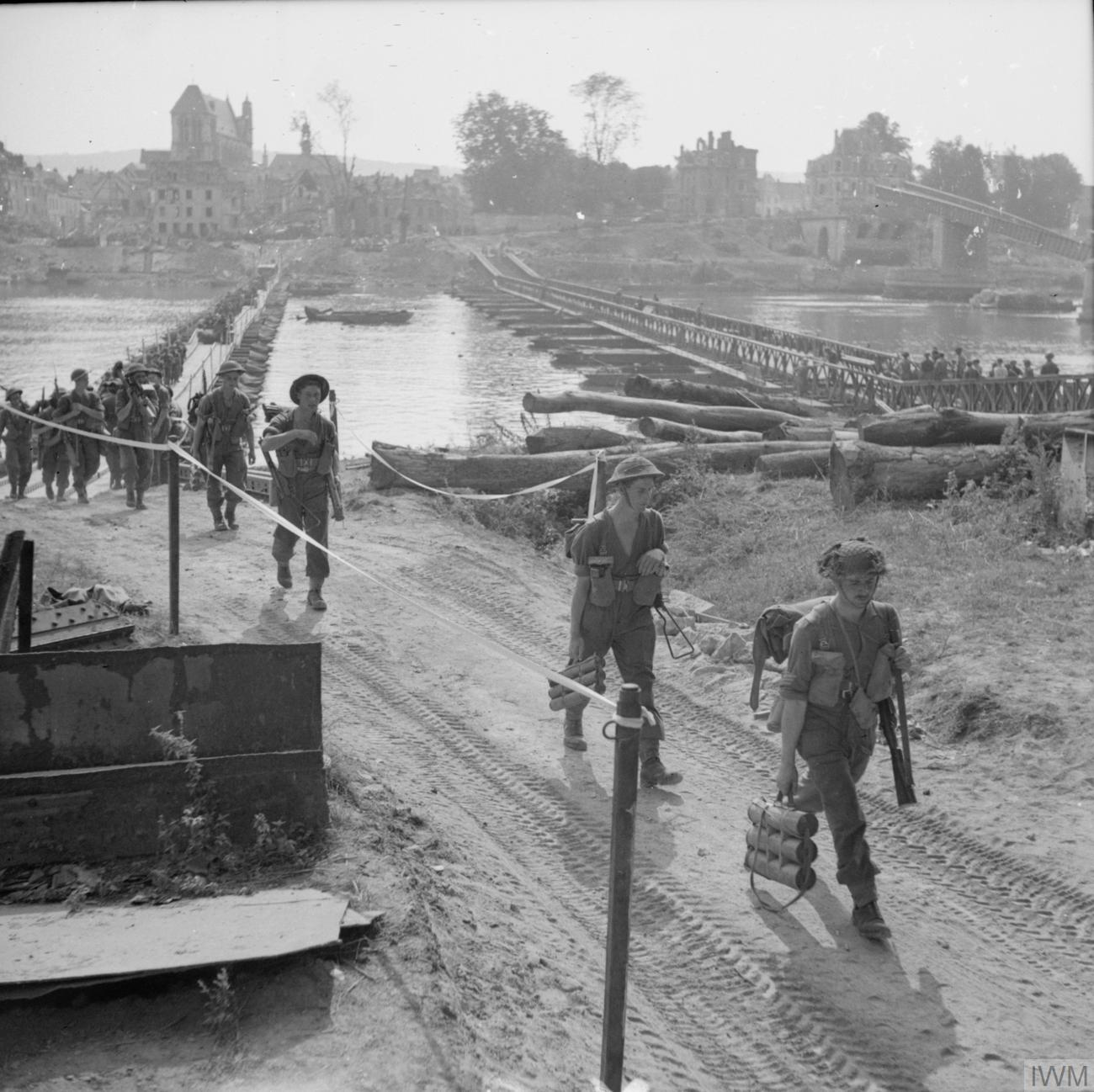
Men of the 1st Battalion, Hampshire Regiment, part of the 231st Brigade of the 50th Division, crossing the Seine at Vernon, 28 August 1944.

In the Second World War, the Hampshire Regiment had six battalions that fought abroad (the 1st, 2nd, 1/4th, 2/4th, 5th and 7th), whilst more battalions stayed at home. By the end of the Second World War, 2,094 officers and men of the Hampshire Regiment had died.

==== The 1st Battalion ====
The 1st Battalion, Hampshire Regiment was a Regular Army unit that was deployed on Garrison duties in El Daba, Egypt at the beginning of the war. It moved to Palestine on peace keeping duties in December 1939 and then moved to Moascar in Egypt, then to Mearsa Matruh in Summer 1940. One of its duties was to look after the large number of Italian prisoners after the fall of Sidi Barrani.

In February 1941, the 1st Battalion arrived in Malta, where it became part of the 1st (Malta) Infantry Brigade (with 1st Dorset Regiment and 2nd Devonshire Regiment). This later became the 231st Infantry Brigade. Duties in Malta included airfield repair and working as stevedores in the docks. Malta was subjected to a prolonged siege and, by July 1942, the food situation had become serious, but the situation eased as the Allies' fortunes improved in the North African campaign.

In April 1943, the 231st Brigade, including the 1st Hampshires, was moved to Alexandria, then subsequently to Cairo and Suez, where it trained as an independent assault brigade. Then, in July 1943, the 1st Battalion invaded Sicily as part of the first wave of Operation Husky, the Allied invasion of Sicily. The beach landing went smoothly, but the 1st Battalion ran into resistance at Vizzini on 13 July when it ran into the 1st Hermann Göring Parachute Panzer Division. On 22 July, the 1st Battalion was engaged in hard fighting for Agria, which only fell on 29 July. The 1st Battalion was reduced to three companies after the battle. There was further hard fighting to capture the Regalbuto Ridge, which ended the Sicilian Campaign. The 1st Battalion suffered 18 officers and 286 other ranks killed or wounded in action in Sicily.

On 8 September 1943, the 231st Brigade landed in Italy, coming ashore at Potro San Venere near Pizzo. The 1st Battalion was involved in fighting as the Germans withdrew northwards. By October 1943, the 1st Battalion was back in Sicily waiting for transport back to the United Kingdom and, by November, the battalion was back in the United Kingdom for the first time in 22 years.

The battalion was allocated to the 50th (Northumbrian) Infantry Division, one of the assault divisions for the invasion of North West Europe, which had an excellent reputation after fighting in the Mediterranean theatre. On 6 June 1944, the 1st Battalion came ashore as part of Operation Overlord without any supporting tanks. Despite facing machine gun fire, the men captured Le Hamel and Arromanches after a hard fight. By the end of D-Day, the 1st Battalion had suffered 182 casualties, 64 of them being killed in action.

The battalion started a three-week fight for the village of Hottot, against the German Panzer-Lehr-Division, in June 1944. This culminated in a major assault on 11 July. The 1st Battalion was withdrawn from the line the next day, testimony to the hard fighting. The battalion was in the vanguard of the assault towards Villiers Bocage later in the month. There were stiff fights at St Germain d’Ectot and Launay. Villiers Bocage was taken on 4 August, following which the 50th Division was taken out of the line. In August 1944, a brigade attack was launched towards Conde, and the battalion attacked St Pierre la Vielle. The fighting was particularly hard and, after the 11-hour battle, three of its Rifle companies were severely reduced – 'B' Company had 25 men, 'C' Company had 35 men, and 'D' Company was down to just 12 men; as 'A' Company was only lightly engaged, it was not so depleted. On 12 August, the 1st Battalion was withdrawn from the line. The battalion was motorised and joined with the 11th Armoured Division for the breakout attack later in the month. There was no fighting and, on 31 August, the 1st Battalion crossed the river Seine at Vernon and swept on to Amiens.

The battalion was then placed under command of the Guards Armoured Division and swept into Brussels on 3 September. The battalion, still under command of the Guards Armoured, then started the attack towards Eindhoven, which was the attack designed to relieve the British and Polish airborne troops fighting at Arnhem, who had dropped as part of Operation Market Garden, which ended in a failure. The battalion, as part of 231st Infantry Brigade, was charged with defending the "Corridor" formed by the armoured advance. In October, the 1st Battalion moved up to Nijmegen and moved onto "The Island", the bridgehead over the river Waal but behind the river Lek.

In October 1944, the battalion attacked north of Bemmel, and expanded the bridgehead up to the Wettering Canal. The battalion then went onto the defensive until the end of November. The battalion then moved back to Ypres in Belgium, and subsequently was moved back to the United Kingdom with the rest of the 50th Division, and the men were mainly used as replacements for other infantry battalions, with the exception of a small training cadre consisting of 12 officers and 100 other ranks. The battalion ended the war in Louth, Lincolnshire. Since D-Day, the 1st Battalion, Hampshire Regiment had suffered over 1,281 casualties, including 231 officers and men killed in action, the rest being either wounded or missing in action.

==== The 2nd Battalion ====
The 2nd Battalion was also a Regular Army battalion and started the war in Aldershot, Hampshire, England. In September 1939, the 2nd Battalion moved to Cherbourg, France with the 1st Guards Brigade, alongside the 3rd Battalion, Grenadier Guards and the 2nd Battalion, Coldstream Guards, attached to 1st Infantry Division. It then moved to Sille-le-Guillaume, and from there 250 miles north to take its allocated place on the "Gort Line", which it reached on 3 October. Later that month, the battalion moved to the Belgian/French border and, in February 1940, the battalion spent three weeks on the Maginot Line before returning to Metz.

The battalion crossed into Belgium in response to the German invasion of Belgium and, by 14 May, was digging into a defensive position. While an attack never came, with the retreat of the Dutch and the French Ninth Army, the 1st Division was ordered to retreat on 16 May. A slow retreat then commenced, ending at Dunkirk. The battalion began to be embarked from Dunkirk for the United Kingdom (some were evacuated on 2 June). The battalion managed to carry away 100% of their small-arms, mortars and anti-tank rifles. It was congratulated by the Minister for War, Mr Anthony Eden. The battalion then spent two years on home defence, training and preparing for a German invasion that never arrived.

In November 1942, the battalion, Hampshire Regiment sailed for North Africa, taking part in Operation Torch with the 1st Guards Brigade, which was now part of the 78th Infantry Division. They disembarked at Algiers on 21 November and joined the British First Army. Later that month, the battalion moved to Tebourba. The following day the 2nd Battalion were attacked by heavy shelling and, on 1 December, the battalion was attacked by a force four times its size, which was able to outflank it and rake it with enfilading fire. This was the start of three days of fierce close combat, fought at close quarters and featuring bayonet charges and counter-charges. The battalion was forced back a mile and a half and, on 3 December, Major Wallace Le Patourel was awarded the Victoria Cross for his gallantry in leading counter-attacks against the enemy. After three days, the battalion retreated through Tebourba, only to find all other troops had been withdrawn and the road behind them was cut. The battalion broke into small groups and attempted to break through to allied lines, reuniting at Medjez-el-Bab; many, including the Commanding Officer, were captured. The battalion, which had started the battle with 689 men, was down to 194 men. The battalion was withdrawn from the line and in December, nine officers and 260 other ranks joined the 2nd Battalion. After the fall of Tunis on 13 May 1943, the 2nd Battalion joined the 128th (Hampshire) Brigade attached to 46th Infantry Division.

==== The 128th Infantry Brigade ====
The Hampshire Regiment had a number of Territorial Army (TA) battalions, whose ranks were swelled throughout 1939 when the TA was ordered to be doubled in size. During 1939, due to the number of new recruits, the 5/7th Battalion was split into the 5th Battalion and the 7th Battalion, and the 4th Battalion was split into the 1/4th Battalion and the 2/4th Battalion. The 1/4th, 2/4th and 5th Battalions were all grouped into the 128th Infantry Brigade (the "Hampshire Brigade") and the 7th Battalion was part of the 130th Infantry Brigade. Both brigades were part of the 43rd (Wessex) Infantry Division.

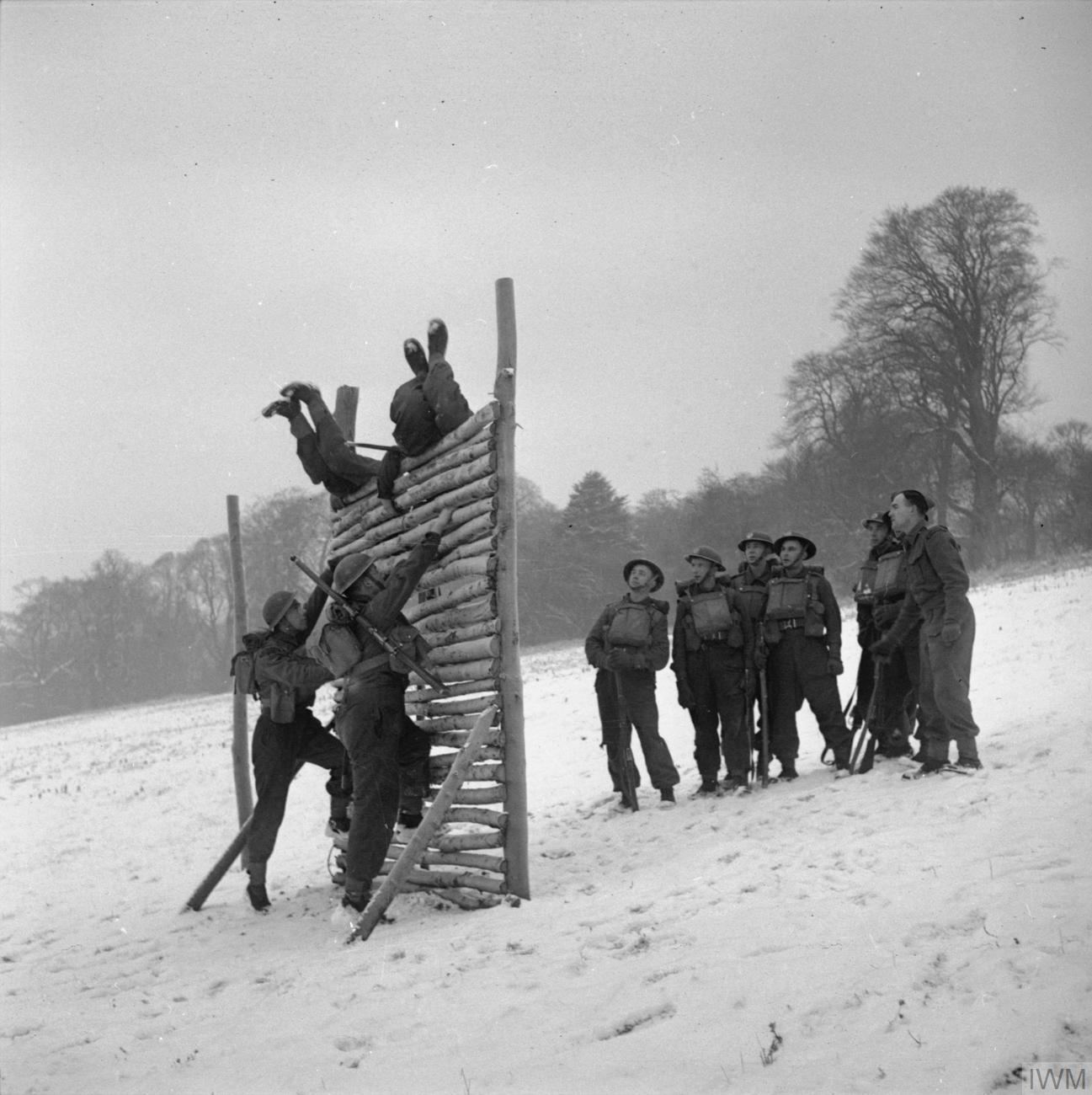
Men of the 2/4th Battalion, Hampshire Regiment scale an obstacle during 'toughening up' training in wintry conditions at Wateringbury in Kent, 20 January 1942.

However, on 6 June 1942, the 128th Brigade was detached from the 43rd Division until 15 August, when it was transferred to the 46th Infantry Division, where it would remain for the rest of the war. In January 1943, the brigade left Britain with the rest of the 46th Infantry Division, for North Africa, as part of Operation Torch. The brigade disembarked at Algiers on 17 January, moving to Bone, where it remained until the end of January, when the brigade moved to Hunts Gap.

The 5th Battalion was sent 12 miles further ahead to Sidi Nsir. The 5th Battalion at Sidi N'sir was attacked in overwhelming strength in February 1943 as the Germans began Operation "Ox Head", a corps-level assault by German Paratroopers, elements of 10th Panzer Division and the 501st Heavy Tank Battalion. The 5th Battalion was supported by 155th Battery, Royal Artillery. The Germans had to take the Hampshires' hilltop positions before they could attack the artillery, knocking out all the guns, whose crews stood and died firing over open sights at the German tanks. Only nine gunners survived. At 5pm, 'B' Company of the 5th Battalion, reduced to 30 men, was overrun. At dusk, the battalion considered its position untenable, and it withdrew to a feature known as "Hampshire Farm". Of the four Rifle Companies, only 'C' Company, less a single platoon, and 30 men of 'D' Company, remained. The German force was delayed for one critical day.

Later in the month, the Hampshire Brigade was attacked at Hunt's Gap by the German force that had been delayed at Sidi N'sir. 2/4th was the main Battalion engaged, with 1/4th Battalion in support. The 2/5th Leicesters was attached to the brigade as well. The situation was so precarious that the 2nd Hampshires, still training its new recruits, was put into the line alongside 1/4th Battalion. The brigade was supported by plenty of artillery and the Churchill tanks of the North Irish Horse. Extensive minefields and heavy dive bombing kept the German tanks at bay. On 28 February, a pre-dawn attack penetrated the 2/4th battalion's 'B' Company positions, but heroic resistance and the tanks of the North Irish Horse kept the Germans at bay until dusk, when 'B' Company was overrun. 'C' Company was overrun by German infantry. On 1 March, the Germans attacked again, and 'D' Company was overrun, but 2/4th Battalion hung on to their remaining positions. On 2 March, the Germans withdrew, and on 5 March the 2/4th Battalion was relieved by the 8th Battalion, Argyll and Sutherland Highlanders of 36th Brigade of the 78th Battleaxe Division. The 2/4th Battalion had suffered 243 men killed or missing.

During March, the brigade was engaged on defensive patrolling, under heavy shelling. 1/4th Battalion lost 100 casualties during March, but 5th Battalion received 5 officers and 150 men as replacements. On 5 April, the brigade handed over its positions and moved 100 miles south to El Ala. The 128th Brigade subsequently captured the Fondouk Gap, allowing the 6th Armoured Division to pass through and debouche onto the Kairouan Plain. In April 1943, the 128th Infantry Brigade attacked Bou Arada. The 16th Battalion, Durham Light Infantry was added to the brigade for the attack. Five Field regiments and two Medium regiments of the Royal Artillery supported the 128th Brigade. Early progress was good, but when the mist cleared all four battalions were caught in the open under heavy fire, and losses mounted. The rifle companies of 1/4th Battalion only had 3 officers and 80 men left between them, and the 2/4th Battalion had to reorganise onto a three-company basis.

Tunis fell and the North African campaign was over in May 1943. The 128th Infantry Brigade was reconstituted to consist of 2nd Battalion, 1/4th Battalion and 5th Battalion. The 2/4th Battalion was split into two to form two Defence Units of two Beach Groups. Their role was to protect the maintenance area of a Beach Group when it made a landing where no port was available.

The 128th Infantry Brigade was one of three British brigades that made an assault landing at Salerno in Italy as part of British X Corps under command of US Fifth Army, led by Mark Clark in September 1943. The landing was opposed by shore batteries firing shrapnel, and the beaches were raked by machine gun fire. 2nd Battalion and 1/4th Battalion made steady progress, but 5th Battalion had been landed in the wrong place and suffered heavily. A German counter-attack overran 'B' Company and the battalion HQ of 5th Battalion. The 5th Battalion lost 40 men killed and over 300 were wounded or taken prisoner.

On 12 September, the Germans started a general assault against the Salerno bridgehead, which made good progress; the US VI Corps were almost driven into the sea. However, the arrival of US paratroops and the British 7th Armoured Division turned the tide. The 128th Brigade was in the hills above Salerno, and the fighting was hard, but on 20 September the Germans began to withdraw northwards, and the pressure eased. All three battalions had suffered – 2nd Battalion suffered 304 casualties, 1/4th Battalion suffered 159 casualties and the 5th Battalion suffered 29 officer and over 400 other rank casualties.

The 128th Brigade, still part of the X Corps, moved up to the River Volturno, behind which the Germans had withdrawn. On 10 October, the 1/4th Battalion captured the town of Castel Volturno, alongside the river, and on 12 October the 1/4th made a night assault across the river, establishing a small bridgehead. The 2nd and 5th battalions moved across the river in support, but the entire 128th Brigade was soon engaged in a stiff fire-fight. The brigade advanced some 2,500 yards, and then dug in behind a canal as the Germans bought up tanks. The brigade remained in the low-lying, swampy, mosquito-ridden land between the river and the canal until the Germans withdrew due to a breakthrough elsewhere. The brigade then advanced along Route 7, meeting little resistance. The 128th Brigade was then taken out of the line for R&R.

In November 1943, the Hampshire Brigade moved up to the River Garigliano. It was relieved on 11 January, and moved back to the River Volturno. They were selected as the Assault Brigade of the 46th Infantry Division, and trained in river crossings. Then, in January 1944, the Hampshire Brigade made a night assault across the swift flowing River Garigliano. The brigade had severe problems getting the boats through the minefields down to the river, and in the darkness confusion reigned. Only a few men managed to get across, and these were withdrawn at daylight. The Hampshire Brigade then assaulted Monte Damiano, a bare, razor-backed feature, already strewn with British dead from 56th (London) Infantry Division. The assault was made by the 1/4th and 2nd battalions in daylight, and immediately came under heavy mortar and machine-gun fire. The attack was made with great dash, but it failed, with heavy casualties.

The 5th Battalion was put under the command of the 138th Infantry Brigade, part of the 46th Division, to assault Mounts Ornito and Cerasola in February 1944. The assault met little opposition, although the Germans put in spirited counter-attacks on Mount Ornito, which were all driven off. However, as the days passed, the casualties mounted from heavy shelling; the bare rock made cover difficult. In eight days, the 5th Battalion suffered 200 casualties. Supply was particularly difficult, as supplies had to be carried up by mules and porters for 3 to 4 hours from the nearest road. On 7 February, the 5th Battalion attacked Mount Cerasola, a successful assault. On 10 February, the 5th Battalion was relieved.

The Hampshire Brigade was relieved later in the month. It moved south to Naples and, on 16 March, sailed for Egypt, and subsequently moved to Palestine, Lebanon, Syria, and back to Egypt. All battalions were brought up to strength, largely from gunners from disbanded Middle-East Anti-Aircraft units who were retrained as infantrymen. On 27 June, the 128th Brigade sailed from Alexandria, and subsequently landed in Taranto. The move north through Italy was at an easy pace.

In August 1944, the 128th Brigade started its assault on the "Gothic Line", a line of German defences across the Etruscan Apennines. The Hampshire brigade, with the North Irish Horse under command, led the 46th Division's assault (along with the 46th Reconnaissance Regiment). The brigade's first target was to cross the River Metauro and take Monte Bartolo. The assault went to plan against little opposition, and Mount Bartolo was captured by the morning of 29 August. The brigade had marched 25 miles to cover 12 miles as the crow flies, and climbed 1,500 feet. Only the 1/4th Battalion had come across serious opposition, engaging in heavy fighting around Montegaudio. Later in the month the brigade assaulted the Gothic Line proper, crossing the River Foglia and assaulting Monte Gridolfo. This was heavily defended, with all cover cleared from its bare slopes. Nevertheless, the men of the 2nd Battalion assaulted them with great vigour, and by dawn on 31 August they had captured the first crest. The 1/4th Battalion passed through, driving deeper into Gothic Line. During this assault, Lieutenant Gerard Norton was awarded the Victoria Cross. On 1 September, the 5th Battalion took the lead, and by 2 September had captured Meleto. The Gothic Line had been breached. A fighting advance continued northwards. On 5 September the 128th Brigade was relieved, and sent to the rear for rest, but they were back in the line by 11 September.

The 128th Brigade began an assault on Montescudo in September 1944. Montescudo was defended by the German 100th Mountain Regiment, and they put up a desperate resistance. Other elements of the Brigade assaulted Trarivi, which was captured by 16 September. On 18 September, the brigade was relieved. All three battalions were short of men, even after replacements were received from the 1st Battalion, Buffs (Royal East Kent Regiment). The Hampshire Brigade crossed the River Fiumicino, and then the Rubicon. The weather was atrocious, and movement was slowed by deep mud, and supply was difficult. Fighting continued until 9 October. A steady advance was made, and by 12 November the River Montone was crossed; on 26 November the River Lamone was reached. This was crossed on 3 December in the face of stiff opposition, and by 6 December the Brigade had captured Casa Nova. The Brigade was relieved the following day, and moved well to the rear. From 24 August (when the 128th Brigade moved up to the Gothic Line) to 7 December, when they were relieved, the 128th (Hampshire) Brigade had suffered 1,276 casualties.

In January 1945 the 2nd Battalion and the 5th Battalion embarked from Taranto and disembarked in Piraeus, Greece, two days later. 1/4th Battalion arrived on 22 January. The 128th (Hampshire) Brigade (now known as "Tigerforce") split its battalions, and set about disarming the ELAS. The troops were welcomed everywhere, and there was no fighting. Then, in April 1945, the brigade began to return to Italy for the final offensive. By 1 May, the brigade was back in the line around Forlimpopoli; but the war ended before the brigade was in action again.

==== The 2/4th Battalion ====
The 20th Beach Group ("A" and "B" companies) invaded Sicily as part of Operation Husky in July 1943. The role of the Beach Group was to land supplies until a harbour could be captured. On 12 July, 20 Beach Group moved inland, behind the advancing infantry, but by 22 July the half-battalion was in the line, capturing Mount Scalpello. On 4 August, the half-battalion moved to Catania, where it remained on garrison duty.

In September 1943, the 21st Beach Group ("C" and "D" companies) invaded Salerno. The assault went in at dawn against stiff opposition and, rather than take its allotted role, the half-battalion was moved straight into the line. However, there was little action until 13 September, when the half-battalion was attacked by armoured half-tracks. This happened again on 15 September when 'D' Company was overrun. However, the half-tracks did not assault 'D' Company as such, they ran over the slit trenches until picked off by 6pdr anti-tank guns. On 17 September, the half-battalion was moved back into reserve and, by 23 September, it was back on the beaches unloading cargo.

In November 1943, the two-halves of the 2/4th Battalion were re-united at Pontecagnano near Salerno. However, there was no immediate employment, and orders were received to send cadres to the three battalions in the 128th (Hampshire) Brigade (this was rescinded after protests). However, six officers and 77 other ranks were posted away to form the "2/4th Hampshire Training Centre", three officers and 188 other ranks were assigned to 'porterage duties' and a detachment of 50 men was assigned to help the Provost Corps with traffic duties.

The battalion was back in the line in Italy, near Garigliano, as part of 28th Infantry Brigade, in 4th Infantry Division in February 1944. This was the same ground where the Hampshire Brigade had suffered through the Italian winter. The battalion was relieved for short periods on a regular basis before returning to the line. In May 1944, the battalion assisted the brigade's two other battalions (2nd King's and 2nd Somersets) in crossing the River Rapido as part of the assault on Monte Cassino. The river and bank were under intense enemy fire, and the river so swift that swimmers from 2/4th had to cross with lines to enable the boats to get across. Troops got across the river, but could make little headway against the storm of machine gun fire. The 2/4th could not get across to join their fellow battalions, and so, on 12 May, it came under command of 12th Infantry Brigade and crossed via a bridge on 13 May. Supported by the 17th/21st Lancers's Sherman tanks, the 2/4th Battalion attacked along the river, taking 200 prisoners. On 14 May, back in the 28th Brigade, the 2/4th attempted to cross the River Pioppeta. The tank bridge sank in the mud, and the battalion took 100 casualties in two minutes. The 2/4th waded the river and, in spite of heavy casualties and fierce resistance, the advance continued. During this advance, Captain Richard Wakeford was awarded the Victoria Cross. By 6.30pm, all objectives had been captured, and the 2/4th reorganised on a three-company basis. On 16 May, the battalion was relieved. Two days later, Cassino was captured by the Polish II Corps.

In June 1944, the battalion was back in the line near the village of Villastrada, between Lake Chiusi and Lake Trasimeno to north of Rome. On 24 June, a major attack was launched on that section of the Trasimene Line by 2nd Battalion, Somerset Light Infantry supported by the tanks of the 12th Canadian Armoured Regiment. 2/4th Hampshires was to follow on, but its entry into battle was delayed until the next day. Having passed through the village of Vaiano, which was unoccupied, an attack was launched on a ridge being held by the German 1st Parachute Division. Although "C" Company established a foothold on the ridge, occupying a farmhouse, that night a fierce German counter-attack was made by the Germans, who overran the company headquarters. Fighting was close and confused, and the company ran low on ammunition. It was forced back to literally the last ditch, but hung on. At dawn the next day, 26 June, the battalion counter-attacked and managed to recapture its previous positions; the Germans were withdrawing to the Arezzo Line. The 2/4th Battalion followed up, coming into action again on 21 July. Supported by the North Irish Horse, a steady advance was made. The 2/4th Battalion was then taken out of the line again – some platoons were down to ten men each with no officer.

The battalion then attacked Santa Lucia, which was captured on 30 July 1944 after a small but fierce battle. The enemy then withdrew, and the battalion moved up to the River Arno. On 10 August, the battalion was withdrawn. In September 1944, the battalion began its assault on the Gothic Line, attacking across the River Marano and capturing Casa Bagli. All the first day objectives were achieved, and the 2/4th defended them on 16 September against German counter-attacks. On 17 September, the battalion captured Cerasola; it was relieved the following day. The battalion then moved north behind the British Eighth Army's advance, arriving in time to stand by to support the Hampshire Brigade's assault on Forli during November. During 22 November, the 2/4th attacked and captured a bridgehead over the River Cosina against heavy shelling; this was the battalion's last action in Italy.

In December 1944, the battalion was flown to Greece in the bomb-bays of Wellington and Liberator bombers in response to the outbreak of the Greek Civil War, arriving on 12 December. The ELAS, armed and trained by the British, was trying to overthrow the Greek Government. On arrival, the 2/4th Battalion was split up, primarily defending the airfield, then clearing ELAS forces from Athens. This did involve some fighting, and the 2/4th Battalion lost three men killed. The 2/4th Battalion then settled down to peace-keeping duties. In May 1945, the battalion was moved to Crete to take charge of the Germans, who had surrendered, and they ended the war there.

==== The 7th Battalion ====
The 7th Battalion was a Territorial Army unit, originally the 5/7th Battalion until it was split into the 5th and 7th battalions when the Territorial Army was doubled in size in the spring and summer of 1939. The 7th Battalion remained in the United Kingdom training long and hard for many years until after the D-Day landings of 6 June 1944.

The battalion was sent to Normandy as reinforcements with the 130th Infantry Brigade attached to the 43rd (Wessex) Infantry Division. In June 1944, the battalion landed near Le Hamel. They were with 130th Brigade (with 4th and 5th Dorsets) and were initially held in reserve. The battalion attacked Maltot, supported by tanks of 9th Royal Tank Regiment (9th RTR) in July 1944. The village was defended by Waffen-SS troops supported by Tiger tanks. Both the 7th Battalion and 9th RTR suffered severe casualties, and although the 7th Battalion managed to fight its way into the village it was withdrawn. The 7th Battalion suffered 18 officer and 208 other rank casualties, including 4 officers and 12 other ranks killed, but was back in the line two days later.

The battalion attacked the village of Cahagnes later in the month. This was fought in typical ‘bocage’ countryside, but after the initial attack by the brigade ran into difficulties, 7th Battalion deployed from reserves and captured Cahagnes, beating off several German counter-attacks. On 2 August, the battalion moved up to Jurques, and after a short stiff fight advanced to "Point 132", close to Mount Pincon. On 6 August, the battalion put in a deceptive attack on Mount Pincon, making a diversion whilst 129th Infantry Brigade made a flank attack. During heavy fighting, 'C' Company incurred many casualties, including all the officers. Following the successful flank attack by the 129th Brigade, the 7th Battalion mopped up and concentrated near Mauny by 10 August.

In August 1944, the battalion captured St Denis de Mere after a bombardment by nine artillery regiments. The battalion took 74 prisoners and then prepared for "The Breakout". The battalion then moved 50 miles north-east to Conches and, by 27 August, the 7th Battalion was across the River Seine. The battalion then participated in the capture of Tilly, and thereafter spent 11 days taking in replacements and resting. In September 1944, the battalion started to move to Brussels for temporary garrison duty, arriving the next day. This easy duty was welcome; since landing in Normandy in June, the 7th Hampshires had lost (including wounded) 35 officers and 450 other ranks.

The battalion fought in Operation Market Garden in September 1944. On 20 September, the battalion moved through Eindhoven to Grave. The battalion was tasked with defending the southern end of the two large bridges over the Waal. On 23 September, the 7th was sent into the line, fighting west of the bridges in the Valburg-Elst area. It then moved to the "Island" and stayed there until 4 October helping to defeat the German counter offensive, before moving to the Groesbeek-Mook area on the Dutch-German border.

In November 1944, the battalion was moved to Maastricht, and then moved around as divisional reserve. On 19 December, the German launched their Ardennes offensive, which caused the 7th Battalion to move north of Liege to guard the bridges over the Meuse. On 26 December, the 7th Battalion moved to Aachen, and on 12 January moved again to Teveren. Then, in January 1945, the battalion captured Putt, then Waldenrath, and on 25 January captured Dremmen and Porselen. The battalion advanced south-east from Cleves as part of the big Reichwald offensive. Over two days fighting for Berkhofel, the 7th lost 70 casualties. It was relieved on 17 February.

The battalion crossed the Rhine in assault craft, consolidating on the far bank and then advancing across the IJssel Canal to Milligen, which was captured on 26 March. German resistance was collapsing, and the 7th moved over the Twente Canal on 1 April, liberating Hengelo. In April 1945, the 7th Battalion took part in operation "Forward On", sweeping through Germany against minimal resistance. However, on 13 April, the battalion had a hard fight for Cloppenburg, a fight that was as hard as any they had fought, vicious hand-to-hand fighting from street to street. Luckily, they were supported by tanks, sappers of the Royal Engineers and a single Armoured Vehicle Royal Engineers, which demolished several buildings with its petard. Cloppenburg was captured the next day. Then, in April, the battalion embarked on its final advance, moving through Bahlum, Bremen, then Bremerhavan, capturing hundreds then thousands of prisoners. The 7th Battalion reached Gnarrenburg on 3 May, and were still there when the Germans surrendered the following day.

==== The home based battalions ====
Although the Hampshire Regiment sent six battalions overseas, many more stayed at home as training units or were converted to other roles. Before the war, the 6th Battalion (Duke of Connaught's Own), Hampshire Regiment was converted into the 59th Anti-Tank Regiment, Royal Artillery, and upon the Territorial Army being doubled in size in 1939, formed a 2nd Line duplicate. The 59th Anti-Tank Regiment served with the 43rd (Wessex) Infantry Division and went with them to Normandy.

The original 8th Battalion (Isle of Wight Rifles), Hampshire Regiment was transferred to the Royal Artillery and made into an artillery battery in 1937. However, a new 8th Battalion was formed, shortly after the war began, at Southampton in December 1939. It subsequently split into the 1/8th and 2/8th Battalions, before the 2/8th Battalion was renamed the 13th Battalion, and then both battalions were re-formed into the 8th Battalion again, which was subsequently renumbered the 30th Battalion and was disbanded in September 1942.

The 9th Battalion was formed on the Isle of Wight in July 1940 and was later assigned to the 201st Independent Infantry Brigade (Home). In 1942, the battalion was converted to armour as the 157th Regiment Royal Armoured Corps and assigned to 36th Army Tank Brigade. Units converted in this way continued to wear their infantry cap badge on the black beret of the Royal Armoured Corps. However, the brigade was disbanded in July 1943 and 157 RAC was broken up in August, without having seen active service.

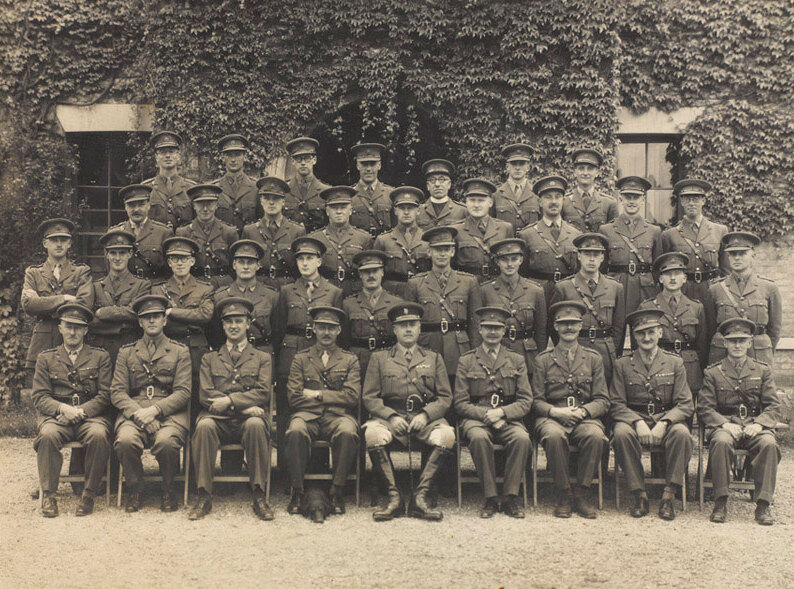
Officers of the 10th Battalion, Hampshire Regiment, 1940.

The 10th Battalion was formed in Aldershot in July 1940; it was assigned to the 201st Independent Infantry Brigade (Home), alongside the 9th Battalion. In 1941, the 10th Hampshire was also transferred to the Royal Armoured Corps, becoming the 147th Regiment Royal Armoured Corps, and was assigned to the 34th Army Tank Brigade. Its Churchill tanks were named after Hampshire Regiment battles (the CO's tank was called "Minden"). The regiment went to serve with distinction with 34th Tank Brigade in the North West Europe campaign at Normandy, Le Havre, the Reichswald Forest and Operation Plunder from 1944 to 1945.

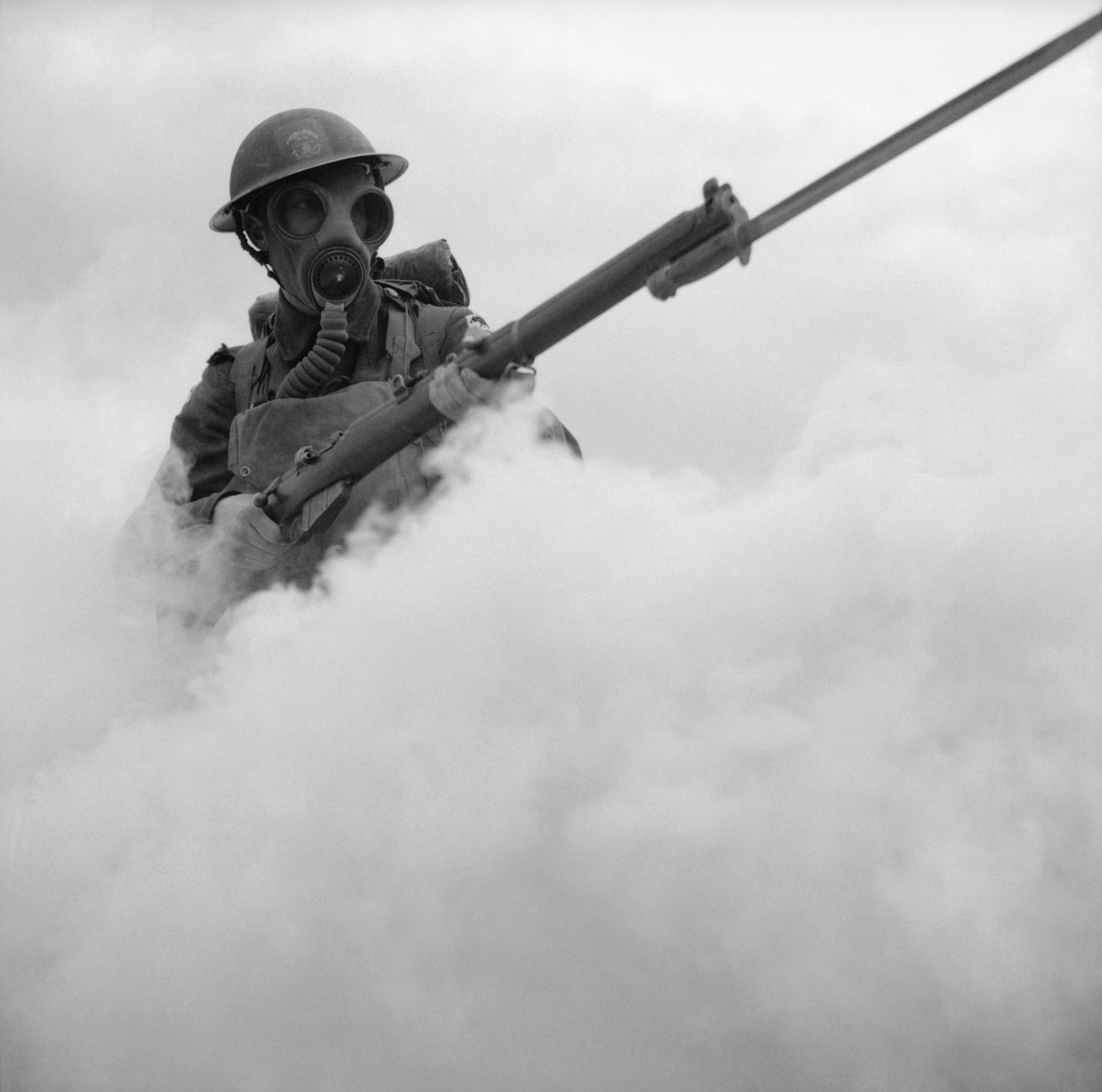
Men of the 12th Battalion, Hampshire Regiment in training at Hengistbury Head near Bournemouth, Dorset. Wearing his gas mask, a soldier advances through a smoke screen.

The 50th (Holding) Battalion, which was formed on the Isle of Wight in June 1940, absorbed the Royal Militia of the Island of Jersey. The Jersey Militia subsequently became the 11th Battalion, whilst the rest of the 50th Battalion became the 12th Battalion. The 11th Battalion stayed in the United Kingdom as a training battalion until the war ended, first with the 209th Brigade and later with the 135th Brigade, 45th (Holding) Division. The 12th Battalion also stayed in the United Kingdom, with the 136th Brigade, but was disbanded in September 1944 after sending a large final draft to the 7th Battalion serving in North-west Europe.

In September 1940, the 70th (Young Soldiers) Battalion was formed in Southampton, but soon moved to Basingstoke. It was raised for those soldiers around the age of 18 or 19 who had volunteered for the Army but were not old enough to be conscripted, the age being 20 at the time. However, the battalion was disbanded in July 1943 as the British government lowered the age of conscription for the British Armed Forces from 20 to 18.

The Hampshire Regiment's Depot had been in Winchester since long before the Second World War. However, in September 1939, it moved to Parkhurst, Isle of Wight, where it stayed for the rest of the war.

=== Cold War ===
During the Cold War, the Hampshire Regiment was rewarded a 'Royal' title and reduced to one battalion. The Regiment, like most others spent a good portion of its post war time as part of BAOR and serving tours in Northern Ireland, the regiment served in several other places such as Palestine, Malaya, Borneo and Hong Kong.

==== Post war ====
In 1946 the 1st Battalion was deployed out to Mandatory Palestine while 2nd Battalion was deployed to Austria. While there, the regiment was awarded the title of Royal Hampshire Regiment in recognition of its service during the Second World War. The regiment was reduced from two battalions to one in August 1946.

In 1954, the 1st Battalion was involved in the Malayan Emergency as part of 26th Gurkha Infantry Brigade and returned to the United Kingdom after two years. In 1957 the Battalion was deployed to Germany as part of 20th Armoured Brigade. Then in 1960 the battalion was deployed to the West Indies and subsequently was stationed in Germany as part of 6th Infantry Brigade from 1962 to 1965. The regiment were deployed to Hong Kong for training and then subsequently Borneo in 1966 and took part in the final months of the Indonesia–Malaysia confrontation. Upon returning to the United Kingdom they were involved in the cleanup of the 1967 Torrey Canyon oil spill. The battalion was then sent out to Cyprus on a UN mission in 1968, and then did its first tour of Northern Ireland in Belfast in 1969 as part of Operation Banner, this would be the first of 8 tours over the course of the next three decades.

==== Minden Company ====
The Battalion was reduced to company level and was subsequently redesignated as Minden Company in 1970 in preparation for amalgamation with the Gloucestershire Regiment, cap badges, shoulder titles and buttons were produced and issued to members of the regiment however the amalgamation was cancelled at the last minute. During this time, the company was deployed to Gibraltar in 1971. Minden company was bought back up to regular battalion strength in 1972.

==== Late Cold War ====
The battalion was in back Northern Ireland in 1972. It was deployed to Hong Kong in 1974, returning in 1976, and was then again stationed in Germany again from 1977 to 1981 in a non-mechanised role as part of 5th Field Force except for a 6-month tour in the Creggan in 1979. 1982 was a busy year for the battalion as they were deployed to County Fermanagh, undertook Public Duties and then was sent to the Falklands in the immediate aftermath of the Falklands War, returning in 1983. The Battalion then served as part of Berlin Infantry Brigade from 1983 to 1986, then deployed out to County Armagh in 1987. The battalion then did two tours in Kenya, one in 1988 and then again in 1991.

==== Amalgamation ====
In September 1992, as part of the Options for Change reorganisations, the regiment was merged with the Queen's Regiment to become the Princess of Wales's Royal Regiment. The Battalion was attached to 2nd Battalion, the Queen's Regiment for its last tour of Northern Ireland in 1992, a unit it would amalgamate with in a few months time.

==== Territorial Army ====
After the Second World War, the last remaining Territorial Army battalions of the Regiment were the 4th and 5th Battalions. In 1956 the two battalions were merged to create the 4/5th Battalion, which were part of 128th Infantry Brigade. In 1967 the Battalion was amalgamated with multiple other Hampshire-based territorial units to form the 1st Battalion, the Wessex Volunteers, with the 4/5th Battalion specifically forming A Company, which was based in Aldershot. This company would later go on to form the 6/7 Battalion, Princess of Wales's Royal Regiment.

== Regimental museum ==
The Royal Hampshire Regiment Museum is based at Lower Barracks in Winchester. It is one of several regimental museums that comprise Winchester's Military Museums.

== Battle honours ==
The Regiment was awarded the following battle honours:

- From the 37th (North Hampshire) Regiment of Foot: Minden, Tournay, Peninsula
- From the 67th (South Hampshire) Regiment of Foot: Barrosa, Peninsula, India, Taku Forts, Pekin 1860, Charasiah, Kabul 1879, Afghanistan 1878–80
- Blenheim^{1}, Ramillies^{1}, Oudenarde^{1}, Malplaquet^{1}, Dettingen^{1}, Belleisle^{2}, Burma 1885–87, Paardeberg, South Africa 1900–02
- The Great War (32 battalions): Le Cateau, Retreat from Mons, Marne 1914 '18, Aisne 1914, Armentières 1914, Ypres 1915 '17 '18, St. Julien, Frezenberg, Bellewaarde, Somme 1916 '18, Albert 1916, Guillemont, Ginchy, Flers-Courcelette, Thiepval, Le Transloy, Ancre Heights, Ancre 1916, Arras 1917 '18, Vimy 1917, Scarpe 1917 '18, Messines 1917, Pilckem, Langemarck 1917, Menin Road, Polygon Wood, Broodseinde, Poelcappelle, Passchendaele, Cambrai 1917 '18, St. Quentin, Bapaume 1918, Rosières, Lys, Estaires, Hazebrouck, Bailleul, Kemmel, Béthune, Tardenois, Drocourt-Quéant, Hindenburg Line, Havrincourt, Canal du Nord, Courtrai, Selle, Valenciennes, Sambre, France and Flanders 1914–18, Italy 1917–18, Kosturino, Struma, Doiran 1917 '18, Macedonia 1915–18, Helles, Landing at Helles, Krithia, Suvla, Sari Bair, Landing at Suvla, Scimitar Hill, Gallipoli 1915–16, Egypt 1915–17, Gaza, El Mughar, Nebi Samwil, Jerusalem, Jaffa, Tell 'Asur, Megiddo, Sharon, Palestine 1917–18, Aden, Shaiba, Kut al Amara 1915 '17, Tigris 1916, Baghdad, Sharqat, Mesopotamia 1915–18, Persia 1918–19, Archangel 1919, Siberia 1918–19
- The Second World War: Dunkirk 1940, Normandy Landing, Tilly sur Seulles, Caen, Hill 112, Mont Pincon, Jurques, St. Pierre La Vielle, Nederrijn, Roer, Rhineland, Goch, Rhine, North-West Europe 1940 '44-45, Tebourba Gap, Sidi Nsir, Hunt's Gap, Montagne Farm, Fondouk, Pichon, El Kourzia, Ber Rabal, North Africa 1940–43, Landing in Sicily, Regalbuto, Sicily 1943, Landing at Porto S. Venere, Salerno, Salerno Hills, Battipaglia, Cava di Tirreni, Volturno Crossing, Garigliano Crossing, Damiano, Monte Ornito, Cerasola, Cassino II, Massa Vertecchi, Trasimene Line, Advance to Florence, Gothic Line, Monte Gridolfo, Montegaudio, Coriano, Montilgallo, Capture of Forli, Cosina Canal Crossing, Lamone Crossing, Pideura, Rimini Line, Montescudo, Frisoni, Italy 1943–45, Athens, Greece 1944–45, Malta 1941–42

=== Recipients of the Victoria Cross ===
- 2nd Lieutenant George Raymond Dallas Moor, 2nd Battalion, Hampshire Regiment, Great War
- 2nd Lieutenant Dennis George Wyldbore Hewitt, 14th (Service) Battalion, Hampshire Regiment, Great War
- 2nd Lieutenant Montague Shadworth Seymour Moore, 15th (Service) Battalion, Hampshire Regiment, Great War
- Major Wallace Le Patourel, 2nd Battalion, Hampshire Regiment, Second World War
- Captain Richard Wakeford, 2/4th Battalion, Hampshire Regiment, Second World War
- Lieutenant Gerard Ross Norton, 1/4th Battalion, Hampshire Regiment, Second World War

== Regimental Colonels ==
Regimental Colonels were:

The Hampshire Regiment - (1881)

- 1881–1888 (1st Bn): Gen. Sir Edmund Haythorne, KCB
- 1881–1883 (2nd Bn): Lt-Gen. William Mark Wood
- 1883–1888 (2nd Bn): Gen. Sir Henry Errington Longden, KCB, CSI
- 1888–1893: Gen. Thomas Edmond Knox, CB
- 1893–1908: Lt-Gen. Sir John Wellesley Thomas, KCB
- 1908–1924: Maj-Gen. Sir Charles Knowles, KCB
- 1924–1945: Gen. Sir Richard Haking, GBE, KCB, KCMG
- 1945–1948: Gen. Sir George Jeffreys, 1st Baron Jeffreys, KCB, KCVO, CMG, JP

The Royal Hampshire Regiment - (1946)

- 1948–1954: Brig. Philip Herbert Cadoux-Hudson, MC, DL
- 1954–1964: Brig. Gerald Dominick Browne, CBE, DL
- 1964–1971: Maj-Gen. Richard Hutchinson Batten, CB, CBE, DSO, DL
- 1971–1981: Brig. David John Warren, DSO, OBE, MC, DL
- 1981–1987: Gen. Sir David Fraser, GCB, OBE, DL
- 1987–1992: Brig. Robert Long, CBE, MC, DL

== Alliances ==
- New Zealand – The Wellington West Coast Regiment (1925–1948)
- New Zealand – The Wellington West Coast and Taranaki Regiment (1948–1992)

== Notes and references ==
Notes

== Sources ==
- Atkinson, C.T. (1950). The Royal Hampshire Regiment 1702 To 1914 (Volume I). regimental history. James MacLehose and Sons.
- Atkinson, C.T. (2004) [1952]. The Royal Hampshire Regiment 1914-1918 (Volume II). regimental history. Naval & Military Press. ISBN 978-1-84-342693-6.
- Daniell, David Scott (2009) [1955]. The Royal Hampshire Regiment 1918-1954 (Volume III). regimental history. Naval & Military Press. ISBN 978-1-84574-257-7.
- Frederick, J.B.M. (1984). Lineage Book of British Land Forces 1660-1978, Volume I. Wakefield: Microform Academic Publishers. ISBN 1-85117-007-3.
- O'Neill, Tom (2006). The Battle of Clonmult: The IRA's Worst Defeat. History Press. ISBN 978-1-84588-554-0.
- Jary, Christopher (2021). Roy's Boys - The Devons Hampshires & Dorsets In Sicily 1943. Semper Fidelis Publications. ISBN 978-0-9929033-8-1.
