= Richard Wakeford =

English recipient of the Victoria Cross

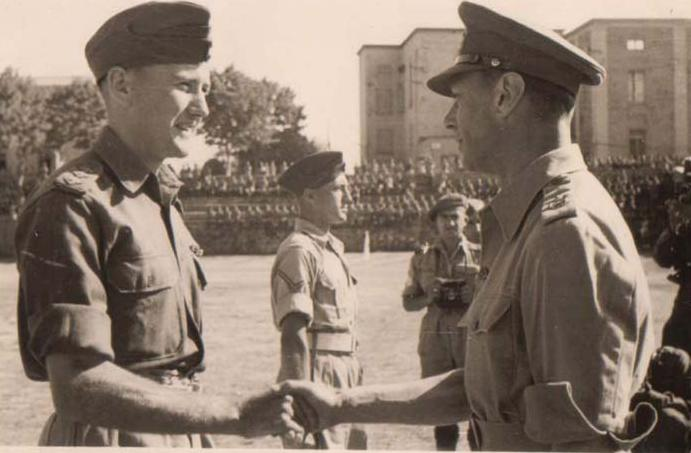
- Captain Wakeford receiving his VC from King George VI.
- Born: 23 July 1921; Kensington, London, England
- Died: 27 August 1972 (aged 51); Leatherhead, Surrey, England
- Military career
- Allegiance: United Kingdom
- Branch: British Army
- Service years: 1941−1946
- Rank: Major
- Service number: 174363
- Units: Hampshire Regiment
- Conflicts: World War II
- Awards: Victoria Cross

Major Richard Wakeford VC (23 July 1921 – 27 August 1972) was an English soldier and a recipient of the Victoria Cross during World War II, the highest and most prestigious award for gallantry in the face of the enemy that can be awarded to British and Commonwealth forces.

== Details ==
Richard Wakeford (1921–1972) was born in Kensington, London on 23 July 1921, the son of Dr. Victor David Collins Wakeford and Mary (née Kee), and was educated at Westminster School and Trinity College, Oxford. In 1939, he began a course in medicine at Oxford University, intending to become a surgeon and follow in his father's footsteps. Unfortunately, World War II curtailed his medical studies, and ultimately his choice of career. He was commissioned into the Army in 1941.

Richard Wakeford was 22 years old, and a temporary captain in the 2/4th Battalion, The Hampshire Regiment of the British Army, during the Second World War when the following deed took place for which he was awarded the VC.

On 13 May 1944, near Cassino, Italy, Captain Wakeford, accompanied by his orderly and armed only with a revolver, went forward and killed a number of men from the German 1st Parachute Division and took 20 prisoners. When attacking a hill feature the following day his company came under heavy fire, although wounded in the face and both arms, Captain Wakeford pressed home the attack. He was wounded again, but reached the objective and consolidated the position.

== Further information ==
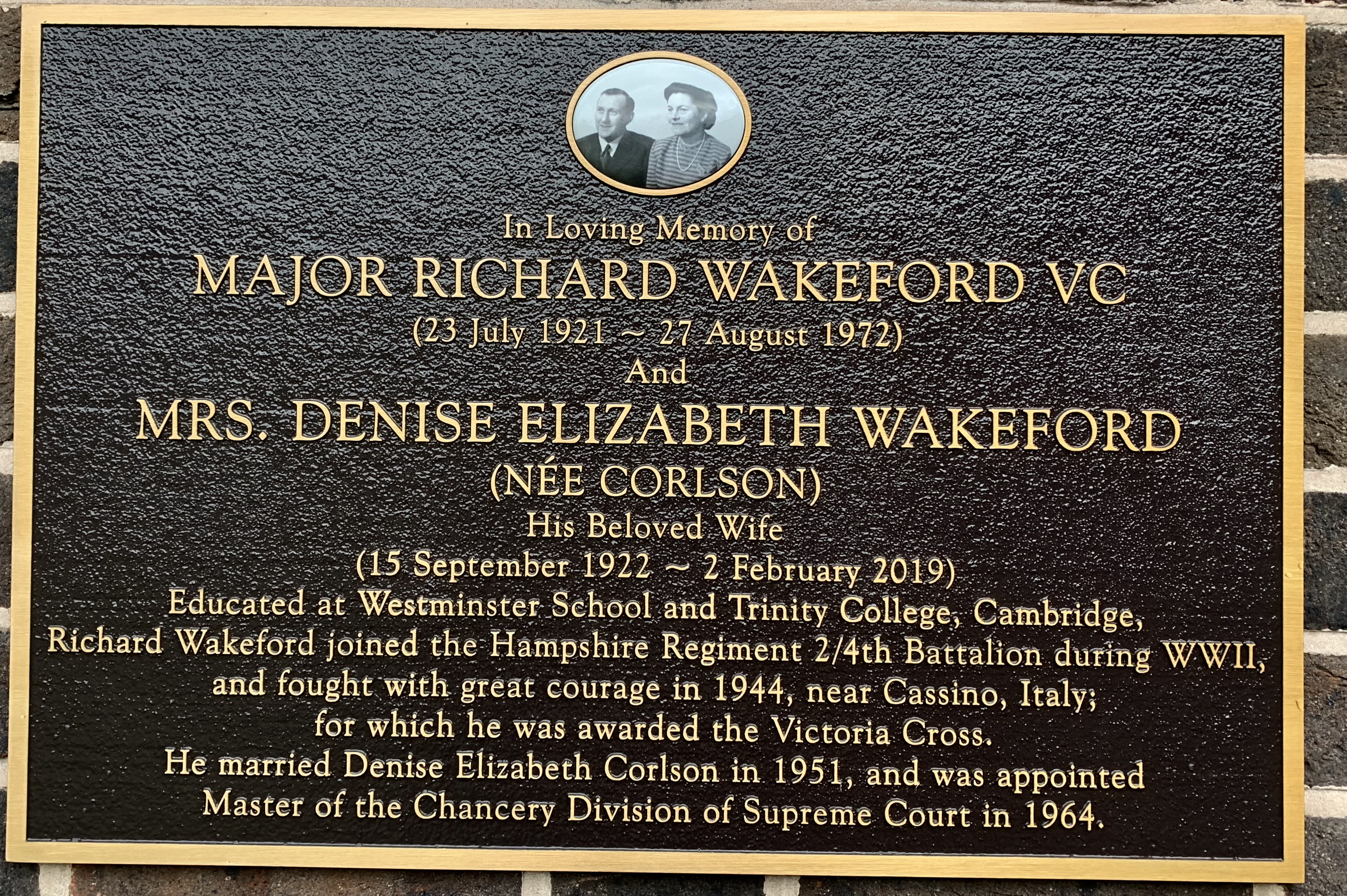

After the war, he returned to Trinity College, Oxford. He stroked the Trinity 1st VIII to the Head of the River in the 1946 Summer Eights. He was invalided out of the army with the rank of major that same year.

On 31 March 1951, he married Denise Elizabeth Corlson at St Saviour's Church, Westcliff on Sea, Essex. Mrs. Denise Wakeford died on 2 February 2019, aged 96.).

He qualified as a solicitor and in 1964 was appointed as a Chancery Master.

Richard Wakeford died at Leatherhead, Surrey, in 1972 aged 51 and was cremated at Leatherhead Randalls Park Crematorium. The Haberdashers' Company, of which he was a Warden, held a memorial service for him on 26 September 1972 at St Lawrence Jewry.

His VC is held by the Worshipful Company of Haberdashers in London.

A memorial plaque in honour of Major Richard Wakeford VC and Mrs. Denise Elizabeth Wakeford was erected at Leatherhead Randalls Park Crematorium, Surrey, England in 2019.

== Bibliography ==
- John, Laffin (1997). British VCs of World War 2: A Study in Heroism. Sutton Publishing. ISBN 0-7509-1026-7.
