= John Prideaux (British Army officer) =

Brigadier-General John Prideaux
- Born: 1718; Devon, England
- Died: 19 July 1759 (aged 40–41) Fort Niagara

John Prideaux (1718 – 19 July 1759) was a brigadier-general in the British Army.

He was born 1718 in Devon, England the second son of Sir John Prideaux, 6th Baronet, of Netherton Hall, near Honiton (see Prideaux Baronets). On 17 July 1739 he was appointed ensign of the 3rd Foot-Guards; he was adjutant of his battalion at the Battle of Dettingen (27 July 1743) and become lieutenant colonel of his regiment on 24 February 1748.

== Seven Years War ==
On 20 October 1758 he was appointed colonel of the 55th Regiment of Foot. During the French and Indian War he was given command of the British force at the Battle of Fort Niagara, promoted as Brigadier General. However, on 19 July 1759 he was killed by being struck in the head with a shell fragment. On the morning of that day, being still dusk, the recently appointed General was inspecting his artillery, when he suddenly stepped in front of a British mortar and was struck on the head by a fragment of shell, which burst prematurely at the mouth of one of their cohorns, and killed him on the spot decapitating him. He is described by some writers as an unpopular officer. The command of the siege of Fort Niagara then fell on Sir William Johnson.

Military offices
Preceded by The Viscount Howe	Colonel of the 55th Regiment of Foot; 1758–1759	Succeeded by James Adolphus Oughton
