= International Numismata Orientalia =

Series of numismatics publications

The International Numismata Orientalia was an important series of publications relating to numismatics of the Middle East and South Asia, with articles contributed by specialist numismatists, published by Messrs Trübner & Co., London, in the late nineteenth century.

== The inspiration for this series ==
The inspiration for the series was the Numismata Orientalia produced by William Marsden, and published earlier in the nineteenth century, which opened up numismatic research in the Middle East and throughout Asia.

== The title ==
The entire series was intended to be a new edition of Marsden's Numismata Orientalia, but it reached beyond the scope of Marsden's work, and from Part 2 onwards was known as International Numismata Orientalia.

== The plan for the series ==
Details of the plan for the entire series were outlined by Edward Thomas in his preface to Vol. 1, part 1:

== Publications ==
- Part 1: Ancient Indian Weights, by Edward Thomas, 1874
- Part 2: Coins of the Urtuki Turkumans, by Stanley Lane Poole, 1875
- Part 3: The Coinage of Lydia and Persia, by Barclay V. Head, 1877
- Part 4: The Coins of the Tuluni Dynasty, by E T Rogers, 1877
- Part 5: The Parthian Coinage, by Percy Gardner, 1877
- Part 6: On the Ancient Coins and Measures of Ceylon, by T W Rhys Davids, 1877
- Part 7: Coins of the Jews, by Frederic W. Madden, 1881
- Part 8: Coins of Arakan, of Pegu, and of Burma, by Arthur Phayre, 1882
- Part 9: Coins of Southern India, by Sir Walter Elliot, 1886
