= Edward Thomas (antiquarian) =

British civil servant of the East India Company, writer on Indian antiquities

Edward Thomas CIE FRS (31 December 1813 – 10 February 1886) was an English civil servant of the East India Company and numismatist, known for his writings on Indian antiquities.

== Life ==
Born on 31 December 1813, the son of Honoratus Leigh Thomas, he was educated at the East India College at Haileybury. He went to India in 1832 as a writer in the Bengal service of the company. Poor health affected his career, and he took several absences in England on sick leave; and when Lord Dalhousie offered him in 1852 the post of foreign secretary to the government of India, he declined it.

After acting for a short time as judge at Delhi, Thomas was appointed superintending judge of the Saugor and Nerbudda territory. He retired on a pension in 1857, and spent the rest of his life in scholarly pursuits, attending the meetings of learned societies and writing on Asian archæology. He was elected a Fellow of the Royal Society in 1871, and appointed a Companion of the Order of the Indian Empire in the 1884 Birthday Honours.

He died in Kensington on 10 February 1886.

== Works ==
Thomas is considered to have made ground-breaking studies in a number of areas of scholarship, such as numismatics (Bactrian, Indo-Scythic, and Sassanian coins); Indian metrology; and Persian gems and inscriptions. His work was recognised by his election as a Fellow of the Royal Society on 8 June 1871, as correspondent of the Institute of France in January 1873, and as honorary member of the Russian Academy; and by his decoration as Companion of the Indian Empire. His major works were:

- Chronicles of the Pathan Kings of Delhi (1847; 2nd enlarged edit. 1871), and
- his edition of James Prinsep's Essays on Indian Antiquities and Useful Tables (2 vols. 1858), which he annotated.
- Jainism or The Early Faith of Asoka

Other publications included:

- Coins of the Kings of Ghazni (1847, 1858);
- Initial Coinage of Bengal (1886, 1873);
- Early Sassanian Inscriptions (1868);
- Ancient Indian Weights (1874), as part i. of the new edition of the Numismata Orientalia [subsequently renamed International Numismata Orientalia] which he edited for Nicholas Trübner; and
- The Revenue of the Mughal Empire (1871, 1882).

Many of his numerous short papers appeared in the Numismatic Chronicle between 1847 and 1883. Rather more were in the Journal of the Royal Asiatic Society, of which he was a member for 40 years and treasurer for 25.

== Notes ==
Attribution

This article incorporates text from a publication now in the public domain: Lee, Sidney, ed. (1898). "Thomas, Edward". Dictionary of National Biography. Vol. 56. London: Smith, Elder & Co.
