= William Marsden (orientalist) =

Irish orientalist and numismatist

William Marsden FRS FSA
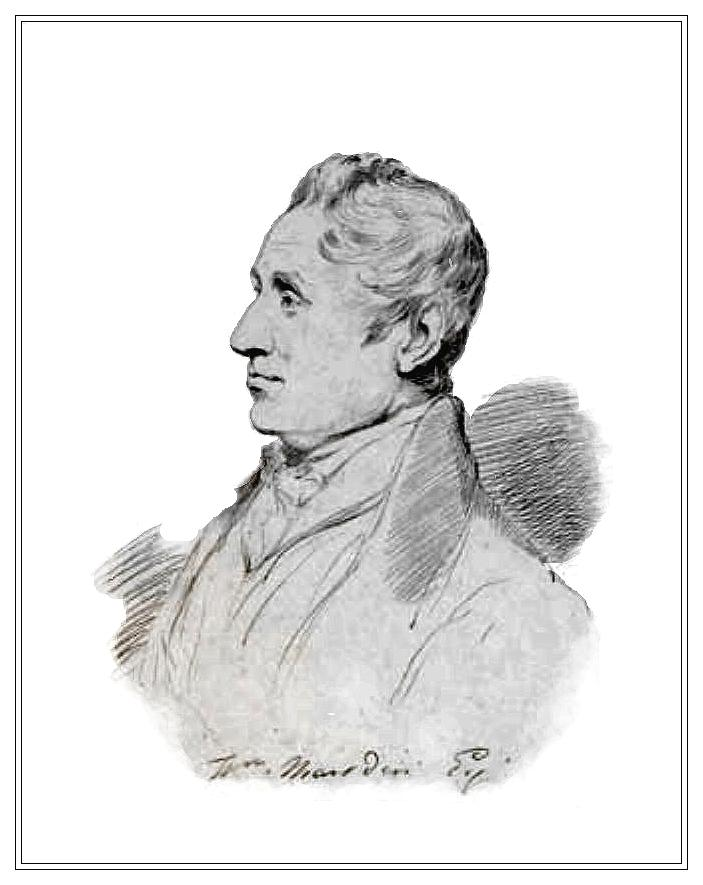
- Marsden in 1815

First Secretary to the Admiralty
- In office 24 January 1804 – 24 June 1807
- Preceded by: Sir Evan Nepean
- Succeeded by: William Wellesley-Pole

Second Secretary to the Admiralty
- In office 3 March 1795 – 21 January 1804
- Preceded by: John Ibbetson
- Succeeded by: Benjamin Tucker

Personal details
- Born: 16 November 1754 Verval, County Wicklow, Ireland
- Died: 6 October 1836 (aged 81) Aldenham, England
- Spouse: Elizabeth Wray (m. 1807)
- Education: Oxford University
- Occupation: Orientalist, numismatist, linguist
- Employer: East India Company

William Marsden FRS FSA (16 November 1754 – 6 October 1836) was an Irish orientalist, numismatist, and linguist who served as Second, then First Secretary to the Admiralty during years of conflict with France.

His translation of the Travels of Marco Polo (later revised by Manuel Komroff and others) remained a standard version well into the 20th century.

== Early life ==
Marsden was born on 16 November 1754 at Verval in County Wicklow to John Marsden (1715–1801), a shipping merchant and banker, and Eleanor Marsden Bagnall (née Bagnall (Note: Also cited as Bagenal.); died 1804). The tenth of sixteen siblings, Marsden was the brother of the barrister Alexander Marsden (1761–1834).

Marsden received a classical education in Dublin, with the intention of studying at Trinity College Dublin for a career in the church.

== Career ==
In 1770, Marsden's elder brother John, a writer in East India Company service at Fort Marlborough, Bengkulu, wrote home to suggest that William should be sent to join him in Sumatra. After successfully petitioning for a Fort Marlborough writership, Marsden left Dublin on 9 December 1770. Arriving at Sumatra on 30 May 1771, Marsden was appointed a position within the secretary's office and was later appointed sub-secretary in November 1773. Marsden assumed the responsibilities of secretary to the company's government in Sumatra in January 1794, and was formally appointed secretary in October 1776.

During his time in Sumatra Marsden learned Malay, collected plants, and sent home scientific observations. After returning to England in 1779, he was awarded the Doctor of Civil Law (D.C.L.) degree by the University of Oxford in 1780 and published his History of Sumatra in 1783.

Marsden was elected to membership in the Royal Society in 1783. He had been recommended by James Rennell, Edward Whitaker Gray, John Topham, Alexander Dalrymple, and Charles Blagden.

In 1795, Marsden was appointed second secretary to the admiralty, later rising to the position of first secretary with a salary of £4,000 per annum. It was in this capacity in 1805 that he received the news of victory in the Battle of Trafalgar and of the death of Admiral Horatio Nelson in the battle. As first secretary he suggested a system later named Marsden squares for arranging and grouping information over the oceans. He retired in 1807 with a lifetime pension of £1,500 per annum which he subsequently relinquished in 1831. In 1812, he published Grammar and Dictionary of the Malay Language. This was followed by a translation of the Travels of Marco Polo in 1818.

Marsden was a member of many learned societies, and treasurer and vice-president of the Royal Society. In 1820, he was elected as a member to the American Philosophical Society. In 1834 he presented his collection of oriental coins to the British Museum and his library of books and Oriental manuscripts to King's College London. His other works are Catalogue of Dictionaries, Vocabularies, Grammars and Alphabets (1796), Numismata Orientalia (London, 1823–1825), and several papers on Eastern topics in the Philosophical Transactions and the Archaeologia.

Marsden's Numismata Orientalia opened the field for Asian numismatics in Western languages, and was used as a definitive reference work of the time, so much so that a new edition was planned in 1870s, but the field had grown so much by then that the new series was soon renamed as the International Numismata Orientalia.

== Personal life ==
On 22 August 1807, Marsden married Elizabeth Wray Wilkins (c. 1787–1863), the daughter of Charles Wilkins, in Marylebone. He died on 6 October 1836 from an attack of apoplexy, and was buried at Kensal Green Cemetery. He left his estate to his kinsman Rev. Canon John Howard Marsden. Elizabeth subsequently married Colonel William Leake FRS on 17 September 1838.

== Legacy ==
Marsden is portrayed as a character in Hornblower and the Crisis by C. S. Forester.

== Selected works ==
- 1784 – The history of Sumatra: containing an account of the government, laws, customs and manners of the native inhabitants, with a description of the natural productions, and a relation of the ancient political state of that island. London: Printed for the author. OCLC 3792458
- 1802 – "Observations on the language of Siwah; in a letter to the Rt. Hon. Sir Joseph Banks; by William Marsden, Esq., F.R.S." in The Journal of Frederick Horneman's Travels: From Cairo to Mourzouk, the Capital of the Kingdom of Fezzan, in Africa, by Friedrich Hornemann, James Rennell, William Marsden and William Young. London: G. and W. Nicol. OCLC 5165766
- 1796 – Catalogue of Dictionaries, Vocabularies, Grammars and Alphabets
- 1812 – Grammar and Dictionary of the Malay Language single edition, Dutch & French translation of the Grammar (C. P. J. Elout based on Marsden), Dutch-Malay & French-Malay Dictionary (C. P. J. Elout based on Marsden)
- 1818 – The Travels of Marco Polo. William Marsden. OCLC 56484937.
- 1823 – Numismata orientalia
- 1830 – Memoirs of a Malayan Family by 'La-uddı̄n Nakhoda Muda (translated by William Marsden). London: Oriental Translation Fund of Great Britain and Ireland. OCLC 5347657
- 1838 – Brief Memoir of the Life and Writings of the Late William Marsden. London: Cox. OCLC 18750067
