= James Adolphus Oughton =

British officer

Lieutenant-General Sir James Adolphus Oughton KB
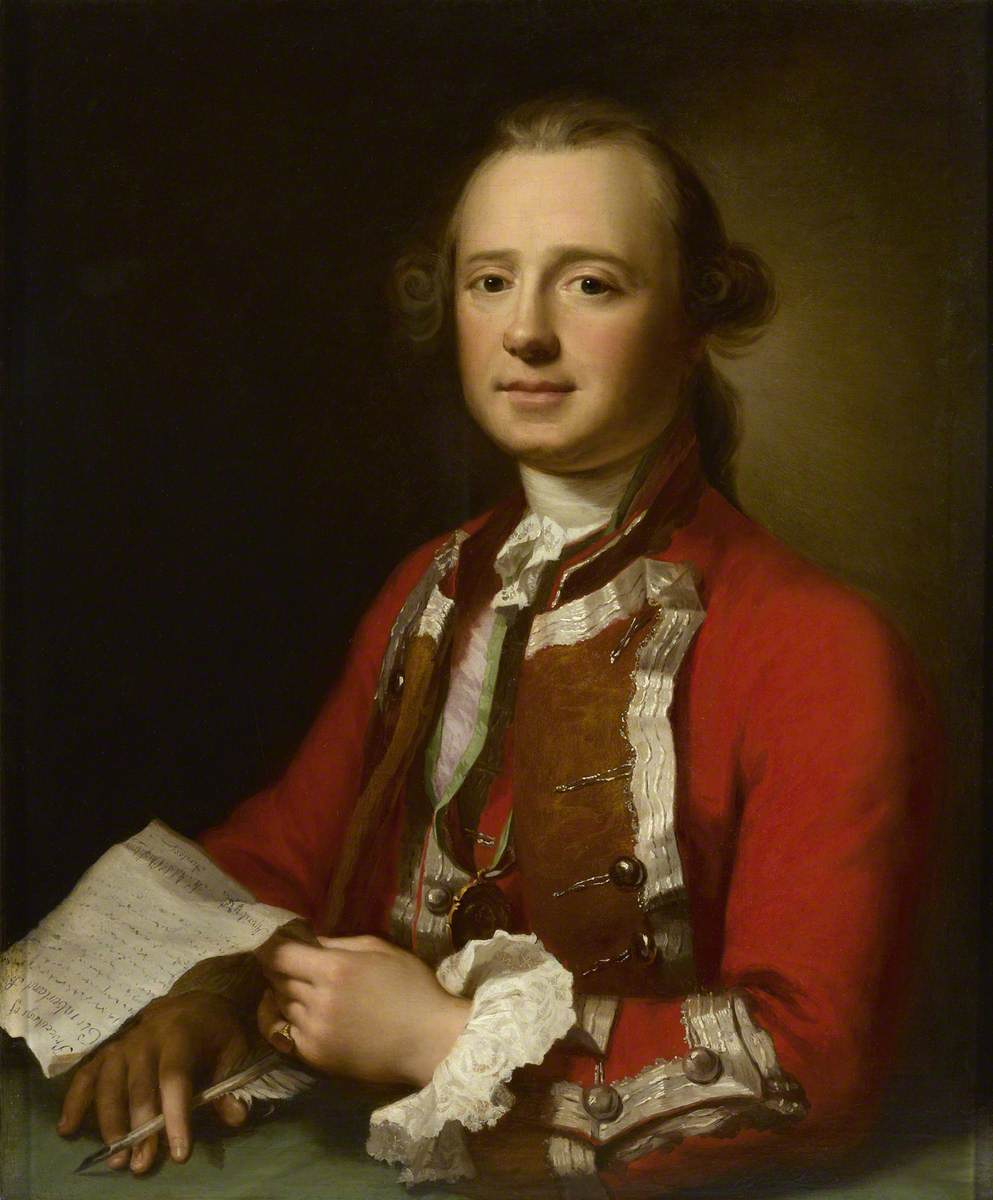
- Portrait by George Knapton, c. 1753
- Born: 1720
- Died: 2 May 1780 (aged 59–60)

Lieutenant-General Sir James Adolphus Oughton KB (1720 – 2 May 1780) was a British officer who was commander of forces in North Britain.

His monument in Westminster Abbey is by Richard Hayward.

Military offices
Preceded by John Prideaux	Colonel of the 55th Regiment of Foot; 1759–1762	Succeeded by William Gansell
Masonic offices
Preceded by The Earl of Dalhousie	Grand Master of the Grand Lodge of Scotland; 1769–1771	Succeeded by The Earl of Dumfries
