= Edmund Haythorne =

British Army general (1818–1888)

General Sir Edmund Haythorne KCB
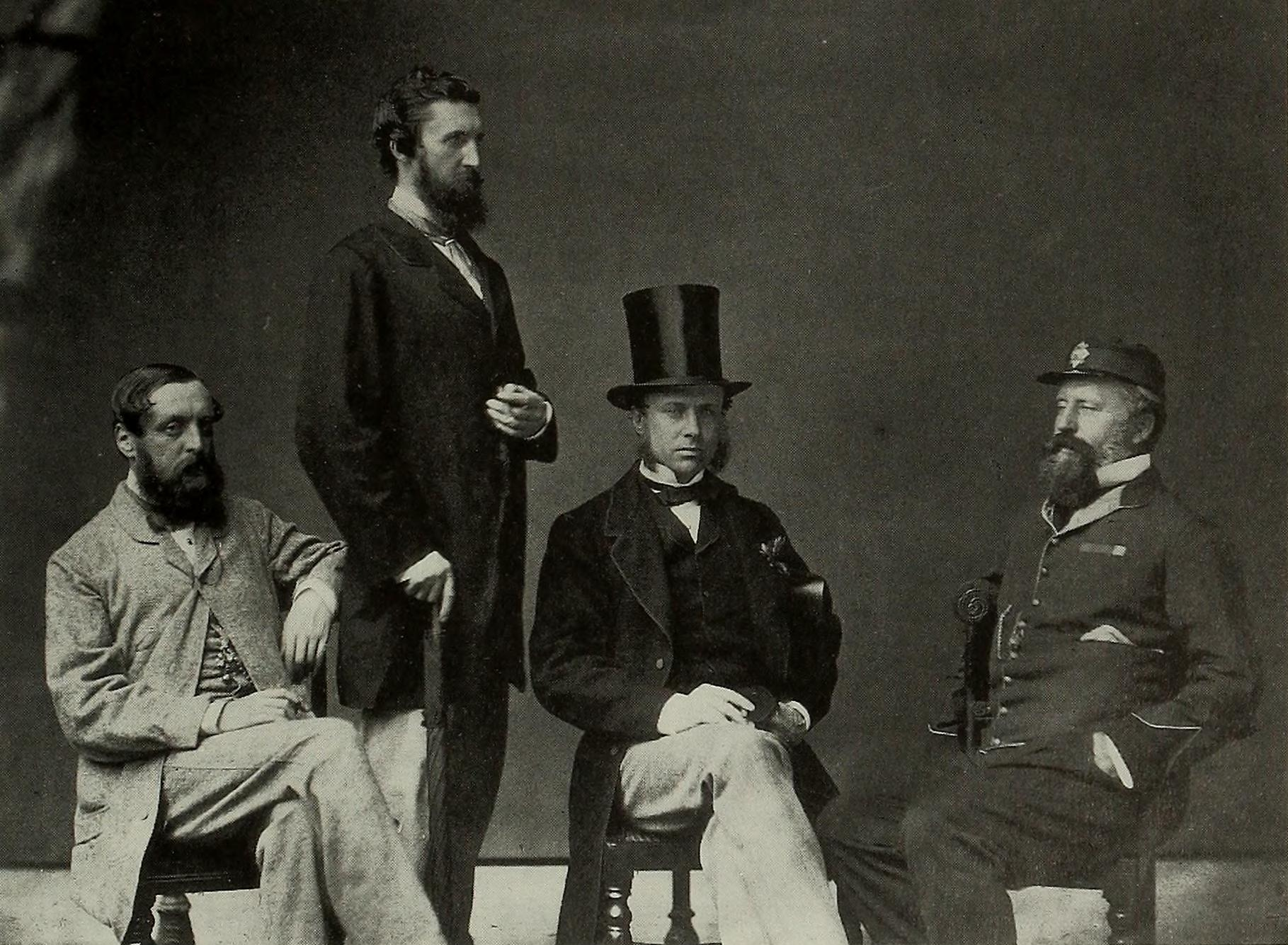
- Colonel Haythorne (far right) as Captain Superintendent of Police in Hong Kong, 1860
- Born: 28 May 1818; Bristol, England
- Died: 18 October 1888 (aged 70); Reading, Berkshire, England
- Burial place: Reading, Berkshire
- Military career
- Allegiance: United Kingdom
- Branch: British Army
- Service years: 1837–1866
- Rank: General
- Conflicts: First Opium War; Second Anglo-Sikh War; Crimean War
- Awards: Knight Commander of the Order of the Bath

General Sir Edmund Haythorne KCB (28 May 1818 – 18 October 1888) was a British Army officer who served as Adjutant-General in India.

== Military career ==
Educated at the Royal Military College, Sandhurst, Haythorne was commissioned into the 98th Regiment of Foot on 12 May 1837. He took part in the Battle of Chinkiang in July 1842 during the First Opium War. He also served as aide-de-camp to General Sir Colin Campbell at the Battle of Chillianwala in January 1849 and the Battle of Gujrat in February 1849 during the Second Anglo-Sikh War. He was brigade major at the Battle of Balaclava in October 1854 and then commanded the 1st Battalion of the 1st Royals during the Siege of Sevastopol in Spring 1855 during the Crimean War. He became Adjutant-General in India in June 1860 before retiring in January 1866.

On his return to England he was given the colonelcy of the 55th (Westmorland) Regiment of Foot in 1878, transferring in 1879 to the 37th (North Hampshire) Regiment of Foot. When the 37th Foot and the 67th Foot amalgamated in 1881 to form the Hampshire Regiment, he became colonel of the 1st Battalion of the new regiment until his death.

Military offices
Preceded by William Pakenham	Adjutant-General, India; 1860–1866	Succeeded by Henry Longden
Preceded by New regiment	Colonel of the 1st Battalion, Hampshire Regiment; 1881–1888	Succeeded by Thomas Edmond Knox
Preceded by Sir Thomas Simson Pratt	Colonel of the 37th (North Hampshire) Regiment of Foot; 1879–1881	Succeeded by Amalgamated to form Hampshire Regiment
Preceded by Sir Philip Melmoth Nelson Guy	Colonel of the 55th (Westmorland) Regiment of Foot; 1878–1879	Succeeded by Sir Henry Charles Barnston Daubeney
