= Henry Errington Longden =

British Army general (1819–1890)

General Sir Henry Errington Longden KCB CSI
- Born: 14 January 1819; London, England
- Died: 29 January 1890 (aged 71); Bournemouth, Dorset
- Military career
- Allegiance: United Kingdom
- Branch: British Army
- Service years: 1836–1880
- Rank: General
- Conflicts: First Anglo-Sikh War; Second Anglo-Sikh War; Indian Rebellion
- Awards: Knight Commander of the Order of the Bath; Companion of the Order of the Star of India

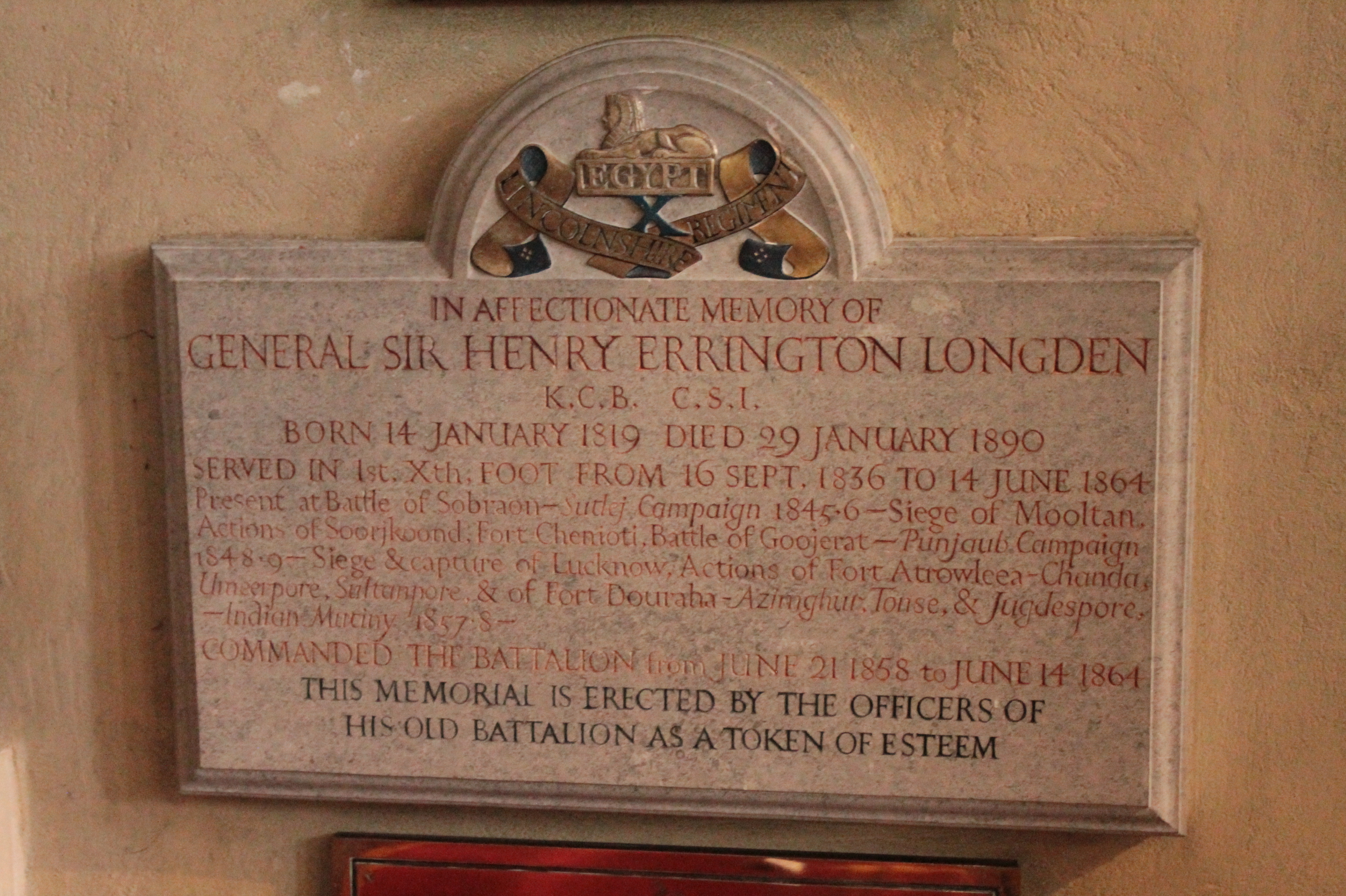
Memorial to General Sir Henry Errington Longden, Lincolnshire Chapel, Lincoln Cathedral

General Sir Henry Errington Longden KCB CSI (14 January 1819 – 29 January 1890) was a British Army officer who served as Adjutant-General in India.

== Military career ==
Educated at Eton College and the Royal Military College, Sandhurst, Longden was commissioned into the 10th Regiment of Foot on 16 September 1836. He fought at the Battle of Sobraon in February 1846 during the First Anglo-Sikh War as well as the Siege of Multan in Autumn 1848 and the Battle of Gujrat in February 1849 during the Second Anglo-Sikh War. He also took part in the Siege of Lucknow in Autumn 1857 and the subsequent relief of Azamgarh during the Indian Rebellion. He became Adjutant-General in India in January 1866 before retiring in 1880.

He was given the colonelcy of the Hampshire Regiment in 1883, transferring in 1888 to be Colonel in Chief of the Lincolnshire Regiment until his death.

He was appointed a Companion of the Order of the Bath on 22 March 1859 and was advanced to Knight of the Order of the Bath on 29 May 1886. He was appointed a Companion of the order of the Star of India on 28 May 1870.

Military offices
Preceded by Edmund Haythorne	Adjutant-General, India; 1866–1869	Succeeded by Frederic Thesiger
Preceded by Prince Edward of Saxe-Weimar	Colonel of the Lincolnshire Regiment; 1888–1890	Succeeded by Reginald Shipley
Preceded by William Mark Wood	Colonel of the Hampshire Regiment; 1883–1888	Succeeded by Thomas Edmond Knox
