= 55th (Westmorland) Regiment of Foot =

Line infantry regiment of the British Army

- 1874–1881 regimental glengarry badge for other ranks
- Active: 1755–1881
- Country: Great Britain (1755–1800); United Kingdom (1801–1881)
- Branch: British Army
- Type: Infantry
- Role: Line infantry
- Size: One battalion
- Garrison/HQ: Carlisle Castle, Carlisle
- Nicknames: "The Cattle Reavers" "The Two Fives"
- Engagements: French and Indian War; Pontiac's War; American War of Independence; French Revolutionary and Napoleonic Wars; Fifth Xhosa War; Coorg War; First Opium War; Crimean War; Bhutan War

Commanders
- Notable commanders: George Howe, 3rd Viscount Howe

The 55th (Westmorland) Regiment of Foot was a line infantry regiment of the British Army. Raised in 1755 as the 55th Regiment of Foot, it served in the French and Indian War, Pontiac's War and American War of Independence before being renamed the "55th (Westmorland) Regiment of Foot" in 1782. The regiment subsequently served in the French Revolutionary and Napoleonic Wars, Fifth Xhosa War, Coorg War, First Opium War, Crimean War and Bhutan War. Under the Childers Reforms it was amalgamated with the 34th (Cumberland) Regiment of Foot to form the Border Regiment in 1881.

== History ==
=== Formation ===
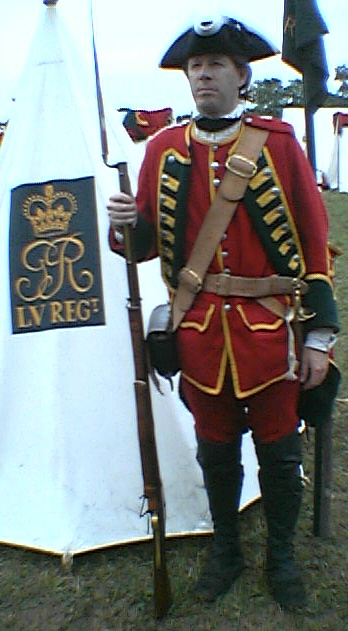
A reenactor portraying a regimental soldier in 1755

The regiment was raised in Stirling by Colonel George Perry as the 57th Regiment of Foot in 1755 for service in the Seven Years' War. It was re-ranked as the 55th Regiment of Foot, following the disbandment of the existing 50th and 51st regiments, in 1756.

=== French and Indian War service ===
The regiment embarked for North America for service in the French and Indian War and arrived in Nova Scotia on 8 July 1757 with the objective of taking part in the abandoned attack on the Fortress of Louisbourg. Following the death of Colonel Perry, Lord George Augustus Viscount Howe was appointed Colonel of the regiment in September 1757. After the regiment arrived in Albany, New York in November 1757, Howe accompanied Major Robert Rogers, commander of His Majesty's Independent Companies of Rangers on a scout, to learn the art of "bush fighting." Howe's willingness to learn from the American rangers and his interaction with subordinates won him the respect of both colonist and British redcoat being described as the "Idol of the army." In the spring of 1758, Howe began to train and accoutre the men in the regiment more like rangers to better adapt them to warfare in America. He was killed in a skirmish the day before the Battle of Carillon in July 1758.

After Howe's death John Prideaux was appointed commander of the regiment. In an unfortunate accident Prideaux was killed by the blast of a cohorn while walking through the entrenchments during the Battle of Fort Niagara in July 1759. The regiment, as part of General Jeffery Amherst's army, participated in the Battle of Ticonderoga and the capture of Fort Crown Point later that month.

In 1760 Colonel James Adolphus Oughton took command of the regiment and led it up the Saint Lawrence River: the regiment witnessed the Montreal Campaign between August and September 1760. William Gansell became the colonel of the regiment in 1762.

=== Pontiac's War ===
In summer 1763, volunteers from the regiment were sent to reinforce the British post at Fort Detroit, which was under siege from neighbouring Native Americans led by Pontiac. The British force was ambushed and badly mauled en route at the Battle of Bloody Run in July 1763. In 1764 many surviving members of the regiment were drafted into the 17th Regiment of Foot. Anne Grant, whose father was an officer in the 55th Regiment, wrote; "they were going to become part of a regiment of no repute; whom they themselves had held in the utmost contempt when they formerly served together."

=== American War of Independence ===
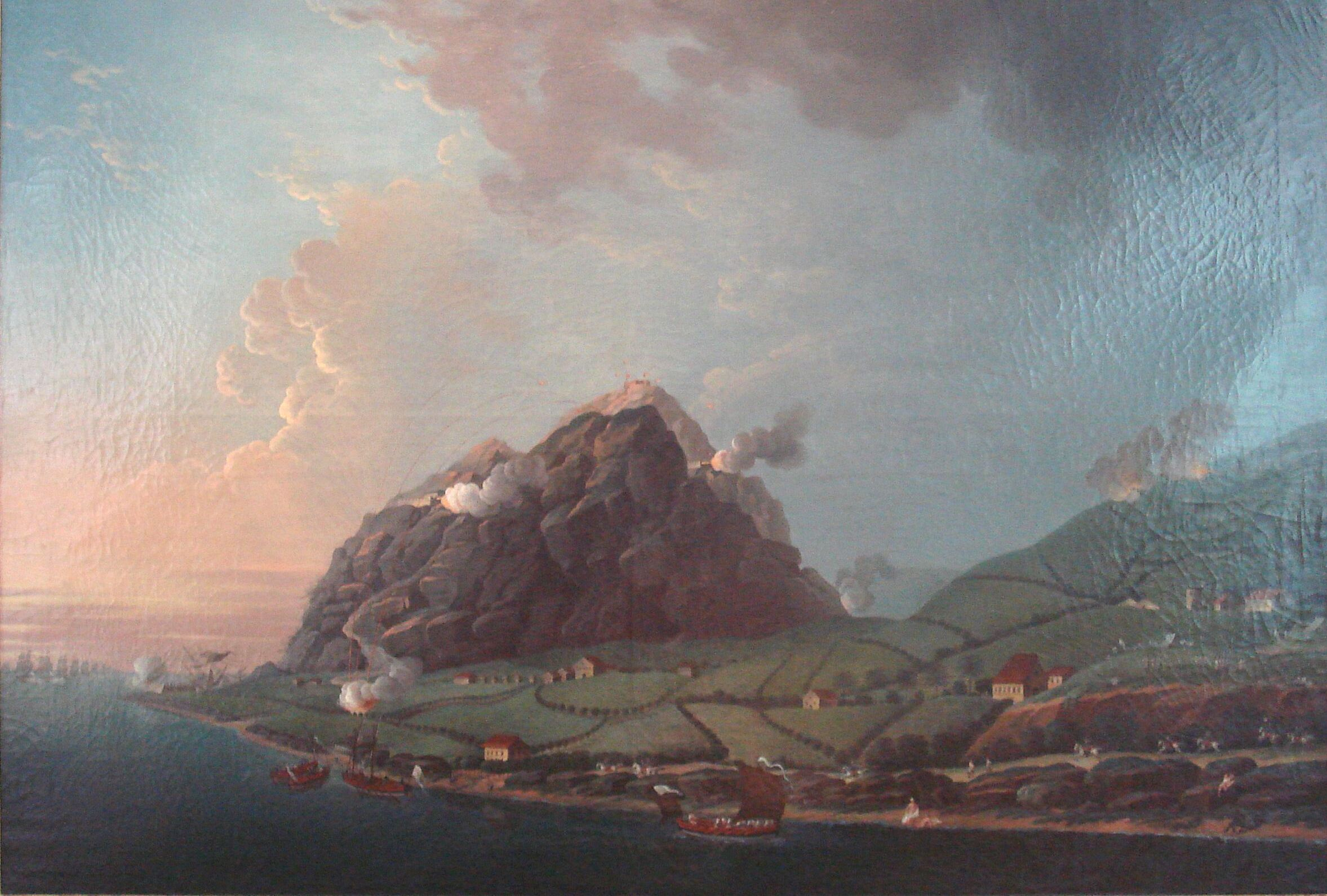
The siege of Brimstone Hill, at which most of the regiment was captured

The regiment returned to North America for the American War of Independence. The regiment fought at the Battle of Long Island in August 1776 and the Battle of Princeton in January 1777. It went on to take part in the Philadelphia campaign and saw action at the Battle of Brandywine in September 1777, the Battle of Paoli later that month and the Battle of Germantown in October 1777. The regiment was transferred to the West Indies in November 1778 and saw action at the Battle of St. Lucia in December 1778. Most of the regiment were captured at the siege of Brimstone Hill in February 1782 during the French invasion of Saint Kitts. The regiment adopted a county designation as the 55th (the Westmoreland) Regiment of Foot in August 1782.

=== French Revolutionary and Napoleonic Wars ===
The Battle of Callantsoog, which the regiment fought in

In 1793 the regiment embarked for Flanders for service in the French Revolutionary Wars and saw action at the siege of Ypres in June 1794. It then moved to the West Indies and took part in the attack on Martinique in February 1794, on Saint Lucia in April 1794 and on Guadeloupe later that month as well as the capture of Saint Lucia in May 1796. It also helped suppress an insurrection by caribs on Saint Vincent in June 1796. After returning to England in 1797 the regiment landed at Ostend in 1798 for service in the Anglo-Russian invasion of Holland. It saw action at the Battle of Callantsoog on 27 August, the Battle of Bergen on 19 September and the Battle of Alkmaar on 2 October. After returning home in 1800 the regiment was deployed to the West Indies again in 1800 and went to the aid of Britain's new found Spanish allies during the Spanish reconquest of Santo Domingo in July 1809. The regiment returned home in 1812 and, having been sent to Holland in 1813, took part in the siege of Bergen op Zoom in March 1814.

=== Victorian era ===
The regiment sailed for the Cape of Good Hope in 1819 and saw action in the Fifth Xhosa War. It also served in the Coorg War in 1834. In 1841 the regiment was deployed to China for service in the First Opium War. It was selected as part of the expeditionary force that moved north from Hong Kong and participated in the Battle of Amoy in August 1841. The regiment was the first to land when British forces disembarked from boats at the Capture of Chusan in October 1841. It landed on a beach and then assaulted an enemy strong point called Guards Hill, where it ascended under heavy fire but eventually took the hill. It then proceeded to take the heights overlooking Tinghai and then immediately descended and placed its regimental colours on the walls of the city. After the battle, a detachment of the 55th and 18th Regiment of Foot were left to garrison the city. On 10 October 1841 the 55th again was part of the force that engaged Qing troops at the Battle of Chinhai: the regiment was left to garrison the city after the battle and remained there for the remainder of the year.

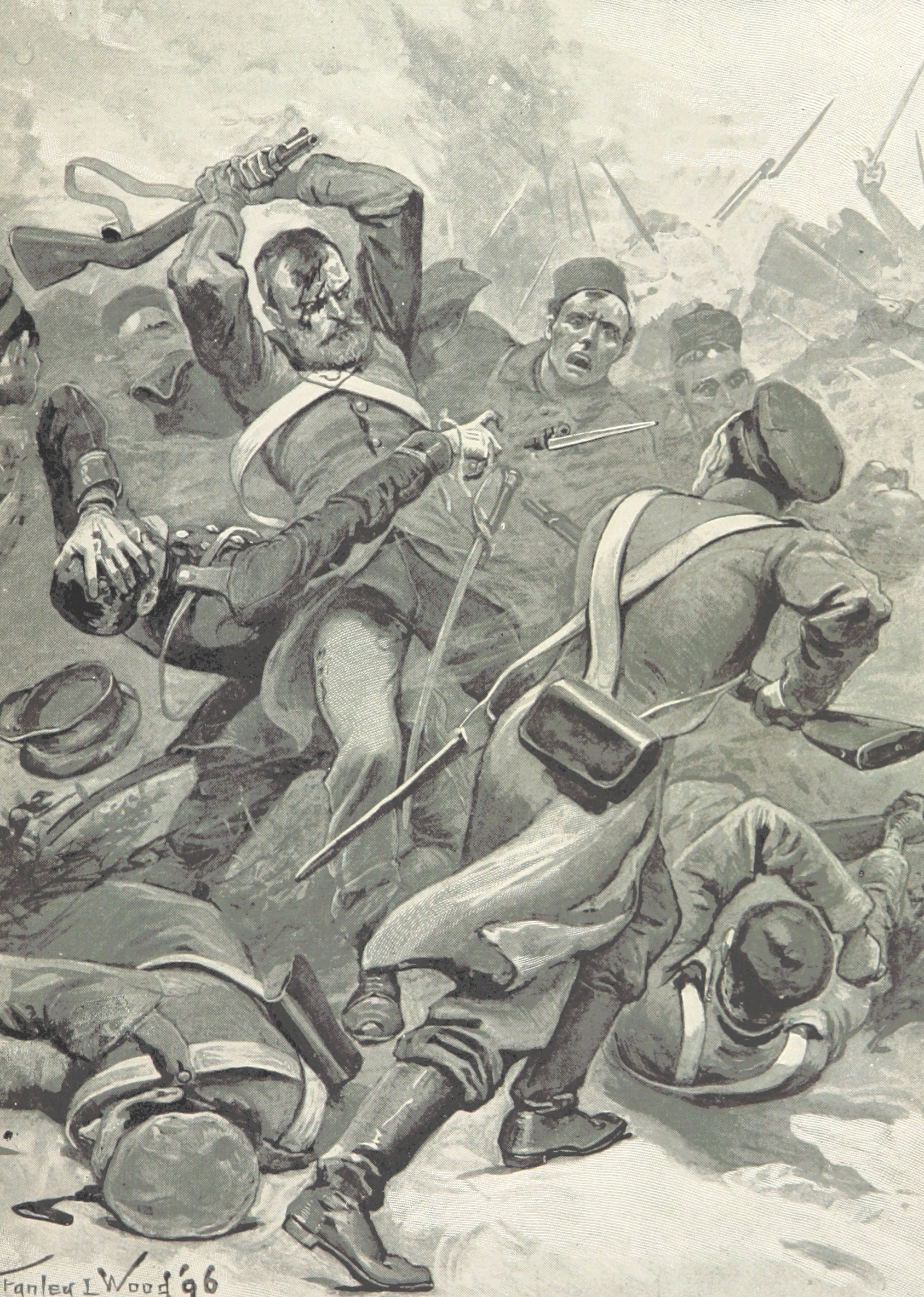
Regimental troops at the Battle of Inkerman

In 1842, the regiment saw action at Chapu in May, and Chinkiang in July. It then garrisoned Chinkiang until the Treaty of Nanking was signed. Part of the regiment remained in Hong Kong after the war. For its service during the war it was allowed the addition of a dragon badge superscribed "China" on its regimental colour. The regiment saw active service in Turkey and Russia during the Crimean War. The regiment saw action at the Battle of Alma in September 1854, the Battle of Inkerman in November 1854 and the siege of Sevastopol in winter 1854. After returning home in 1857 it was deployed to India in 1863 and saw action during the Bhutan War in 1864.

As part of the Cardwell Reforms of the 1870s, where single-battalion regiments were linked together to share a single depot and recruiting district in the United Kingdom, the 55th was linked with the 34th (Cumberland) Regiment of Foot, and assigned to district no. 2 at Carlisle Castle. On 1 July 1881 the Childers Reforms came into effect and the regiment amalgamated with the 34th (Cumberland) Regiment of Foot to form the Border Regiment with the former 55th forming the 2nd battalion. There is a memorial chapel for the Border Regiment, housing the colours of the 55th regiment, at Kendal Parish Church.

== Battle honours ==
The regiment received the following battle honours:

- American Revolutionary War (1775–78); St Lucia, 1778
- Crimean War (1854–55); Alma, Inkerman, Sevastopol

== Victoria Crosses ==
Victoria Crosses awarded to men of the regiment were:

- Private Thomas Beach, Crimean War (5 Nov 1854)
- Brevet Major Frederick Cockayne Elton, Crimean War (29 March 1855)

== Colonels ==
The Colonels of the regiment have been:

=== 57th Regiment of Foot ===
- 1755–1757: Col Charles Perry

=== 55th Regiment of Foot ===
- 1757–1758: Brig-Gen George Augustus Howe
- 1758–1759: Brig-Gen John Prideaux
- 1759–1762: Lt-Gen Sir James Adolphus Oughton
- 1762–1774: Lt-Gen William Gansell
- 1774–1775: Lt-Gen Richard Lambart, 6th Earl of Cavan
- 1775: Gen Sir Robert Pigot, 2nd Baronet
- 1775–1791: Gen James Grant

55th (Westmoreland) Regiment

- 1791–1811: Gen Loftus Anthony Tottenham
- 1811–1812: Lt-Gen Donald McDonald
- 1812–1814: Lt-Gen Sir Colin Campbell
- 1814–1846: Gen Sir William Henry Clinton
- 1846: Lt-Gen Alexander George Fraser, 17th Lord Saltoun
- 1846–1848: Lt-Gen John Wardlaw
- 1848–1855: Gen John Millet Hamerton
- 1855–1856: Lt-Gen Hon. Henry Edward Butler
- 1856–1857: Maj-Gen Hon. George Anson
- 1857–1861: Lt-Gen Sir James Holmes Schoedde
- 1861–1862: Gen Sir William Henry Elliott
- 1862–1873: Gen Sir Patrick Edmonstone Craigie
- 1873–1878: Gen Sir Philip Melmoth Nelson Guy
- 1878–1879: Gen Sir Edmund Haythorne
- 1879–1881: Gen Sir Henry Charles Barnston Daubeney

== Sources ==
- Grant, Anne (1846). Memoirs of an American Lady. D. Appleton & Co.
- Knox, Captain John. Historical Journal of the Campaigns in North America for the Years 1757, 1758, 1759 and 1760. Edited by Arthur Doughty. Champlain Society.
- MacPherson, Duncan (1843). Two Years in China (2nd ed.). Saunders and Otley.
- Putnam, Rufus (1903). The memoirs of Rufus Putnam. Boston: Houghton, Mifflin.
- Frontier and Overseas Expeditions From India, Volume IV: Expeditions Overseas. Calcutta: Superintendent Government Printing. 1911.
