= Ernest Neville Rolfe =

Royal Navy Admiral (1847–1909)

Admiral Ernest Neville Rolfe, CB (11 August 1847 – 11 May 1909) was a Royal Navy officer who saw extensive service in Africa.

Rolfe entered HMS Britannia as a cadet in June 1861 and saw active service during the Third Anglo-Ashanti War, during operations on the Congo and Niger rivers from 1874 to 1876, and during the Anglo-Egyptian War of 1882. He subsequently commanded a naval brigade under Sir Gerald Graham in the Sudan.

In retirement, he was a churchwarden of St Margaret's, Westminster.
