= Henry Daubeney (cricketer) =

English cricketer (1812–1850)

Personal information
- Full name: Henry William Bowles Daubeney
- Born: 23 November 1812; Madras, Madras Presidency, British India
- Died: 3 October 1850 (aged 37); Scarborough, Yorkshire, England
- Batting: Unknown

Domestic team information
- Years: Team
- 1834–1837: Oxford University

Career statistics
Competition	First-class
Matches	4
Runs scored	35
Batting average	5.83
100s/50s	0/0
Top score	19
Catches/stumpings	0/–
- Source: ESPNcricinfo, 25 February 2020

Henry William Bowles Daubeney (23 November 1812 – 3 October 1850) was an English first-class cricketer and clergyman.

The son of Major-General Henry Daubeney, he was born in British India at Madras in November 1812. He was educated in England at Winchester College, before going up to Trinity College, Oxford. While studying at Oxford, he made four appearances in first-class cricket for Oxford University between 1834 and 1837, all against the Marylebone Cricket Club.

After graduating from Oxford, Daubeney took holy orders in the Church of England. His first ecclesiastical posting was as perpetual curate of Cainscross, Gloucestershire. Afterward he became the personal chaplain to the Earl of Waldegrave. In 1841, he became the vicar of Hannington, Wiltshire. His final post was as rector of Kirk Bramwith, Yorkshire. Daubeney died at Scarborough in October 1850, aged 37.
