= Daubeney Turberville =

English physician

- Born: 1612; Wayford, England
- Died: 21 April 1696 (aged 83–84); Salisbury, England
- Occupation: Physician

Daubeney Turberville (1612 – 21 April 1696) was an English physician.

== Biography ==
Turberville was born at Wayford in Somerset in 1612, was the son of George Turberville of that place. He matriculated from Oriel College, Oxford, on 7 November 1634, graduating B.A. on 15 October 1635 and M.A. on 17 July 1640. On the outbreak of the civil war he took up arms for the king, and assisted in the defence of Exeter in 1645. On its surrender to Fairfax in April 1646 he retired to Wayford, and practised medicine there and at the neighbouring town of Crookhorn. He eventually removed to Salisbury, and at the Restoration on 7 Aug. 1660 took the degree of M.D. at Oxford. He made a speciality of eye diseases and acquired considerable fame. According to Walter Pope, he cured Queen Anne, when she was a child, of a dangerous inflammation in her eyes, after the court physicians had failed. He was also consulted for his eyes by Samuel Pepys, to whom ‘he did discourse learnedly about them’ (Pepys, Diary, 1848, iv. 472, 482, 483). He died at Salisbury on 21 April 1696, and was buried in the cathedral. His wife Anne, whom he married at Wayford about 1646, died without issue on 15 December 1694.
