= Mount Scalpello =

Hill in Italy

Coordinates: 37°32′53″N 14°39′8″E

- Location within Sicily Location within Italy Location within Europe

Highest point
- Elevation: 583 m (1,913 ft)
- Prominence: 787 ft (240 m)

Naming
- Language of name: Italian

Geography
- Country: Italy
- Region: Sicily

Mount Scalpello (Italian: Monte Scalpello) is a 583 metres (1,913 ft) hill in central eastern Sicily, Italy. The hill is mostly known for Triassic and Neolithic remains being found in 1997 and there it is mostly linked with Canadian campaign of WW2 in Italy where a mule path south of the hill was the location of multiple CYR advances during night operations. After which two companies held the hill against constant German mortar and artillery.
