= Frederick Cockayne Elton =

English recipient of the Victoria Cross

Frederick Cockayne Elton VC
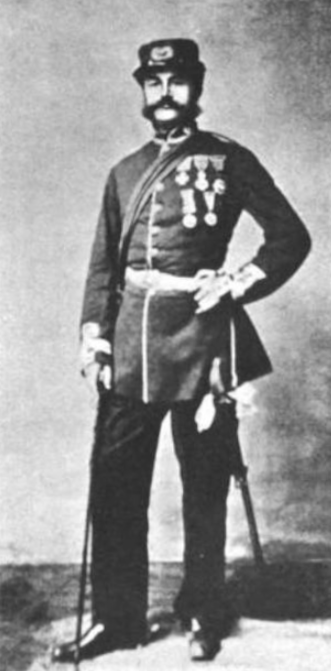
- Born: 23 April 1832; Whitestaunton, Somerset, England
- Died: 24 March 1888 (aged 55); London, England
- Burial place: St Andrew's Churchyard, Whitestaunton
- Military career
- Allegiance: United Kingdom
- Branch: British Army
- Rank: Lieutenant Colonel
- Units: 55th Regiment of Foot; 21st Regiment of Foot; 67th Regiment of Foot
- Conflicts: Crimean War
- Awards: Victoria Cross; Order of the Medjidie; Legion of Honour

Frederick Cockayne Elton VC (23 April 1832 – 24 March 1888) was an English recipient of the Victoria Cross, the highest award for gallantry in the face of the enemy that can be awarded to British and Commonwealth forces.

== Details ==
Elton was born in Whitestaunton, Somerset, to Reverend William Tierney Elton and Lucy Caroline Elton, daughter of Sir Charles Abraham Elton, 6th Baronet. His paternal grandmother was Catherine Bayard, a descendant of Nicholas Bayard, Stephanus Van Cortlandt and the Schuyler family, all from British North America. Nicholas's mother was Ann Stuyvesant, who was a sister of Peter Stuyvesant.

He was 22 years old, and a Brevet Major in the 55th Regiment of Foot, British Army during the Crimean War when the following deed took place for which he was awarded the VC.

On 29 March 1855 at Sebastopol, the Crimea, Major Elton, with a small number of men, drove off a party of Russians who were destroying one of the new detached works, taking one prisoner himself. On 7 June he was the first to lead his men from the trenches. On 4 August he was in command of a working party in the advanced trenches in front of the Quarries, encouraging his men to work under very heavy fire and even used a pick and shovel himself to set an example.

Elton also received the French Légion d'honneur and the Turkish Order of Medjidie.
