= Henry Daubeney (British Army officer) =

English army officer

General Sir Henry Daubeney GCB CStJ
- Born: 1810
- Died: 17 January 1903 (aged 92–93); Spring Grove, Isleworth
- Military career
- Allegiance: United Kingdom
- Branch: British Army
- Service years: 1829–1880
- Rank: General
- Units: 55th (Westmorland) Regiment of Foot; Border Regiment
- Conflicts: Coorg War; First Opium War; Crimean War

General Sir Henry Charles Barnston Daubeney GCB CStJ (1810– 17 January 1903) was a senior officer in the British Army during the 19th century.

== Biography ==
Daubeney was born in 1810, the son of Lieutenant General Henry Daubeney, KH, of the 80th Regiment of Foot.

He was commissioned into the army on 12 March 1829, and joined the 55th (Westmorland) Regiment of Foot. He was promoted to lieutenant in August 1831, and served with his regiment in the Coorg War in India in 1834, taking part in the assault and capture of Kissenhully and of Soamwar Pettah. Promoted to captain in October 1836, he commanded the Light Company in China 1841–42 during part of the First Opium War, where he took part in the storming and capture of Chapu (18 May 1842). He also served on the Staff as brigade-major to Sir James Schoedde at the storming of Tching-Kiang-Foo (21 July 1842). For his service he received the brevet rank of major, the war medal and was appointed a Companion of the Order of the Bath (CB). He was promoted to the full rank of major in November 1845.

Daubeney was in command of the contingent of the 55th Regiment during the Crimean War, taking part in the battles of the Alma (September 1854) and Inkerman (November 1854), and in the Siege of Sevastopol (1854–1855). Commanding the 1st brigade of the 2nd division at Inkerman, he was wounded and his horse shot under him. He was gazetted to the substantive rank of lieutenant-colonel in December 1854, but declined to be able to stay on active duty while his regiment was in the field, and only accepted the promotion in March 1855. For his service in this war, he received the reward for distinguished services, the Crimea Medal with three clasps, the Turkish Crimea Medal, the fourth class of the Ottoman Order of the Medjidie, and was made a Chevalier of the French Legion of Honour.

He was promoted to colonel in September 1857, to major-general in March 1868, was appointed a Knight Commander of the Order of the Bath (KCB) in 1872, and promoted to lieutenant-general in October 1877.

In 1879 he was appointed Colonel of his regiment, the 55th (Westmoreland) Regiment of Foot. When this regiment was amalgamated with the 34th (Cumberland) Regiment of Foot to form the new Border Regiment in the 1881 Childers Reforms, Daubeney continued as Colonel of the 2nd Battalion of this regiment until his death in 1903. He received the brevet promotion to full general on 4 March 1880, and retired from the army the same year. He was appointed a Knight Grand Cross of the Order of the Bath (GCB) in the 1884 Birthday Honours.

He died at his residence at Spring Grove, Isleworth on 17 January 1903, in his 93rd year.

== Notes ==
Military offices
Preceded by Sir Edmund Haythorne	Colonel of the 55th (Westmorland) Regiment of Foot; 1879–1881	Succeeded by Last holder
Preceded by Inaugural holder	Colonel of the Border Regiment; 1881–1903	Succeeded by Sir Robert Hume
