= List of British recipients of the Légion d'Honneur for the Crimean War =

National Order of the Legion of Honour Ordre national de la Légion d'honneur
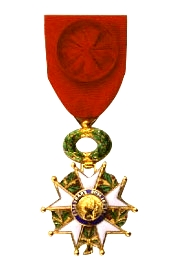
- Officier medal of the French Légion d'honneur
- Type: Order with five degrees
- Awarded for: Excellent civil or military conduct delivered, upon official investigation
- Presented by: France
- Status: Open since 1802
- Established: 19 May 1802
- First award: 14 July 1804
- Ordre de la Légion d'honneur streamer Grand'croix (1st Class) Grand Officier (2nd Class) Commandeur (3rd Class) Officier (4th Class) Chevalier (5th Class) Ribbon bars of the order

Precedence
- Next (higher): None
- Next (lower): Ordre de la Libération

The Légion d'Honneur was awarded to 746 members of the British Armed Forces during the Crimean War (also known as the Russian War) which lasted from 1854 to 1856. Prior to the Crimean War there was no precedent of a mass exchange of awards between allied nations. However, in January 1856 Queen Victoria and the Emperor of France formally agreed to an interchange of decorations between their two Armies. However, nominations for the French awards had already been gathered, with recommendations requested at the end of October 1855 and mid December 1855. In exchange several awards of the Order of the Bath were made to French soldiers and sailors.

Awards of the Légion d'Honneur to members of the British Armed Forces during the Crimean War were made in two lots, with awards first announced in the Le Moniteur of 16 and 19 July 1856 (with a consolidated list appearing in the London Gazette of 4 August 1856) and again on 22 April 1857 (which was republished in the London Gazette on 1 May 1857). The Légion d'Honneur decorations awarded to members of the British Armed Forces were those of Napoleon III's Second Empire with the Maltese Asterisk suspended from an Imperial Crown.

== British Armed Forces Recipients ==
The following alphabetical listing of recipients was drawn from the two London Gazette lists, with decorations awarded in the grade of Chevalier (5th class) unless otherwise stated.

- Abbott, 1829 Private Timothy 95th Regiment
- Adams, Brevet-Lieutenant-Colonel Cadwallader 49th Regiment
- Adams, Colonel Frank C.B., 28th Regiment (4TH CLASS)
- Adye, Lieutenant-Colonel John Miller C.B. Royal Artillery (4TH CLASS)
- Airey, Lieutenant-Colonel James Talbot C.B., Asst Quartermaster-Genl, Coldstream Guards, Staff
- Airey, Major-General Sir Richard K.C.B. (3RD CLASS)
- Alderson, Lieutenant Henry James. Royal Artillery
- Alexander, Brevet-Lieut.-Colonel George Gardiner Royal Marine Artillery RM
- Alexander, Inspector-General Thomas C.B., Medical Staff
- Allan, Captain William 41st Regiment
- Allen, William A.B., "Agamemnon." RN
- Anderson, Captain Richard 56th Regiment
- Anderson, First Class Staff-Surgeon Arthur M.D. Medical Staff
- Anderson, Lieutenant William Christian. RE
- Andrews, Major W.G. Royal Artillery (LG May 1858)
- Andrews, Serjeant John 2nd Battalion Rifle Brigade
- Aplin, Brevet-Major John Guise Rogers 28th Regiment
- Appleyard, Captain Frederick Ernest 7th Regiment
- Arbuthnot, Lieutenant Henry. Royal Artillery
- Arguimbeau, Mr. Narcissus RN
- Armstong, Brevet-Major Anthony William Samuel Freeman, 18th Regiment
- Armstrong, Acting Lieutenant Richard Ramsay RN
- Armstrong, Captain Thomas Priaulx St. George 49th Regiment
- Armstrong, Lieutenant-Colonel James Wells 49th Regiment, Staff
- Armytage, Commander William RN
- Armytage, Lieutenant and Captain and Brevet-Major Henry. Coldstream Guards
- Atcherley, Brevet-Major Francis Topping, 30th Regiment
- Aylmer, Brevet - Lieutenant - Colonel Frederick Charles 89th Regiment
- Aynsley, Commander Charles Murray. RN
- Babbington, Private Charles, 5th Dragoon Guards Cavalry
- Baddeley, Brevet-Major John Fraser Lodington Royal Artillery
- Baker, Mr. Thomas RN Inspector of Machinery
- Balgonie, Captain Viscount. Grenadier Guards
- Ball, Mr. Edward Codrington RN
- Bambrick, Private John Thomas 11th Hussars. Cavalry
- Baring, Captain and Lieutenant-Colonel Charles Coldstream Guards.
- Baring, Lieutenant and Captain and Brevet-Major Francis. Scots Fusilier Guards
- Barker, Brevet-Colonel George Robert C.B., Royal Artillery
- Barlow, Colonel Maurice Unattached. Infantry
- Barnard, Major-General Sir Henry William K.C.B. (3RD CLASS)
- Barnett, Lieutenant John Barber RN
- Barnston, Captain William 55th Regiment
- Barnston, Major Roger Deputy-Assistant Quartermaster-General, 90th Regiment, Staff
- Barry, David, Able Seaman, " Cracker." RN
- Bayly, Major Paget Unattached. Infantry
- Beal, Mr. John Paymaster RN
- Bell, 1215 Colour-Serjeant Joseph 7th Regiment
- Bell, Colonel George C.B., late 1st Royals, Inspecting Field Officer
- Bell, Major Edward William Derrington 23rd Regiment
- Bellairs, Brevet-Major William Deputy-Assistant Quartermaster-General, 49th Regiment, Staff
- Bent, Brevet-Lieutenant-Colonel George C.B. RE
- Bentinck, Major-General Sir Henry John William K.C.B. (3RD CLASS)
- Beresford, Captain George Robert 88th Regiment
- Bickford, Commander Joseph Grant. RN
- Biddulph, Brevet - Lieutenant - Colonel Michael Anthony Shrapnel, Royal Artillery
- Bingham, Brevet-Major George, Lord Bingham, Coldstream Guards, Staff
- Blackett, Captain Edward William 2nd Battalion Rifle Brigade
- Blane, Brevet-Lieutenant-Colonel Robert Unattached, Asst Adjutant-Gen, & now Military Sec, Staff
- Blount, Brevet-Lieutenant-Colonel Herbert 23rd Regiment
- Blyth, Captain David RM
- Bolton, Brevet-Major William John Royal Artillery
- Bond, 3492 Private William 46th Regiment
- Boothby, Brevet-Major John George Royal Artillery
- Borlase, Captain John C.B. RN
- Borritt, Serjeant-Major Henry 77th Regiment
- Borton, Colonel Arthur C.B., 9th Regiment
- Bostock, Surgeon-Major John Ashton M.D., Scots Fusilier Guards. Medical Staff
- Bourchier, Brevet-Lieutenant-Colonel Eustace Fane C.B. RE
- Bourchier, Brevet-Major Claud Thomas 3rd Battalion Rifle Brigade.
- Bowden, Commander William RN
- Bower, Mr. George Henry Kerr. RN
- Bowyear, Captain George Le Geyt. RN
- Boyle, Brevet-Major William 89th Regiment
- Brady, Staff Assistant-Surgeon Thomas Clarke, Medical Staff
- Brandling, Brevet-Major John James C.B. Royal Artillery
- Brett, Lieutenant and Adjutant John 1st Battalion Rifle Brigade
- Bright, Major Robert Onesiphorus, 19th Regiment
- Brooker, Lieutenant Edward Wolfe RN
- Brookes, First Lieutenant Joshua Rowland RM
- Broughton, Brevet-Major Spencer Delves. Royal Artillery
- Broughton, Lieutenant Legh Delves. Royal Artillery
- Brown, 3313 Private Joseph 20th Regiment
- Brown, Brevet-Major George John 4th Light Dragoons. Cavalry
- Brown, General Sir George G.C.B. (1ST CLASS)
- Brown, Lieutenant Jolm Henry. Royal Artillery
- Brown, Trumpeter John, 17th Lancers. Cavalry
- Brown, Captain John Martin 1st Royals, 1st Battalion
- Browne, Brevet-Lieutenant-Colonel Andrew 44th Regiment
- Browne, Brevet-Major James Frankfort Manners, C.B. RE
- Browne, Captain George Richard 88th Regiment
- Browne, Major Henry Ralph, Unattached, late 9th Regiment
- Brownrigg, Brevet-Colonel Studholme C.B. Grenadier Guards Staff (4TH CLASS)
- Bruce, Serjeant-Conductor Robert. Royal Artillery
- Brush, Second Class Staff-Surgeon John Ramsay M.D., half-pay. Medical Staff
- Buckley, Commander Cecil William RN
- Bull, Commander James RN
- Bull, John Gunner Royal Marine Artillery RM
- Buller, Major-General Sir George K.C.B. (3RD CLASS)
- Bullock, Lieutenant Thomas Thelwall. RN
- Bunbury, Lieutenant-Colonel Henry William C.B., 23rd Regiment
- Bunton, John Private RM
- Burgess, 1782 Joseph 57th Regiment
- Burgoyne, Commander Hugh Talbot RN
- Burgoyne, General Sir John Fox, Bart., G.C.B. (2ND CLASS)
- Burke, Gunner and Driver Robert 6th Company, 11th Battalion. Royal Artillery
- Burnett, Captain William Farquharson C.B. RN
- Butler, Brevet-Lieutenant-Colonel Percy Archer 28th Regiment
- Butler, Brevet-Major Charles Richard, 20th Regiment
- Butler, Brevet-Major Henry 57th Regiment
- Butler, Corporal James 49th Regiment
- Byng, Commander John Clark RN
- Calthorpe, Major the Honourable Somerset John Gough, Unattached, Staff
- Cameron, Brevet-Major William Gordon 49th Regiment, late Grenadier Guards
- Cameron, Colonel Duncan Alexander C.B., 42nd Regiment (4TH CLASS)
- Campbell, Brevet-Lieutenant-Colonel Colin Frederick 46th Regiment
- Campbell, Brevet-Major Hugh Archibald Beauchamp Royal Artillery
- Campbell, Captain Henry Wotton 79th Regiment
- Campbell, Colonel Robert Parker C.B. 90th Regiment
- Campbell, Lieutenant and Captain the Honourable Henry Walter Coldstream Guards, Staff
- Campbell, Lieutenant Colin Andrew RN
- Campbell, Lieutenant-General Sir Colin G.C.B. (2ND CLASS)
- Campbell, Serjeant Joseph 20th Regiment
- Campion, Commander Hubert RN
- Cardigan, Major-General The Earl of Cardigan, K.C.B. (3RD CLASS)
- Carleton, Captain William Henry, 21st Regiment
- Carmichael, Captain George Lynedock 95th Regiment
- Carmichael, James, M.D. Medical Officer RN
- Carpenter, Deputy Commissary-General Frederick Stanley, Commissariat
- Carr, Captain Ralph Edward 36th Regiment, late 39th Regiment
- Carter, Major William Frederick 63rd Regiment
- Carter, Rear-Admiral Thomas Wren C.B. (4TH CLASS)
- Carthew, Brevet-Major Edmund John. Royal Artillery
- Cave, Commander John Halliday RN
- Chapman, Frederick Edward C.B. RE
- Chappel, William Corporal RM
- Chawner, Captain Edward Henry, 77th Regiment
- Chippindall, Brevet-Major Edward, 19th Regiment
- Christie, Colour-Serjeant Charles 42nd Regiment
- Churchill, Henry Adrian Esq., C.B.
- Claremont, Lieutenant-Colonel Edward Stopford C.B. Unattached, Staff (4th Class)
- Clarke, Captain and Brevet-Lieutenant-Colonel George Calvert, 2nd Royal Dragoons. Cavalry
- Cleeve, Mr. Frederick RN
- Cleverly, John Gunner's Mate, " London." RN
- Clifford, Brevet-Major Hon. Henry 1st Battalion Rifle Brigade
- Clifton, Brevet-Lieutenant-Colonel Thomas Henry, Unattached, Staff
- Codrington, Lieutenant-General Sir William K.C.B. (3RD CLASS)
- Colborne, Brevet-Lieutenant-Colonel Hon. Francis C.B., Asst Quartermaster-Gen, Unattached, Staff
- Cole, Serjeant Samuel No. 2,515, Driver Company. Royal Sappers and Miners
- Coles, Captain Cowper Phipps RN
- Collings, Brevet-Lieutenant-Colonel John Elias 33rd Regiment of Foot
- Collins, 2nd Corporal Joseph No. 2,382. Royal Sappers and Miners
- Colville, Major Hon. William Colville, Aide-de-Camp, Rifle Brigade, Staff
- Comber, Commander Henry Wandesford RN
- Commerell, Commander John Edmund RN
- Conolly, Captain Henry Hamilton Royal Artillery
- Conolly, Major James Deputy Asst Quartermaster-General, Unattached. Cavalry
- Cooch, Brevet-Major Charles 62nd Regiment
- Cooke, Corporal William, 9th Regiment
- Cooke, Brevet-Major Edwin Adolphus late 11th Hussars. Cavalry
- Coonin, 1825 Private Thomas 77th Regiment
- Cooper, Lieutenant John Robert Deane RN
- Cooper, Mr. Henry, Boatswain, Warrant Officer RN
- Cornwall, Captain George 93rd Regiment
- Cowell, Lieutenant John Clayton. RE
- Crang, Commander John Hay RN
- Creagh, Lieutenant John Brazier RN
- Crisell, 1896 Private Henry 1st Royals, 2nd Battalion
- Crofton, Lieutenant-Colonel Hugh Dennis Unattached. Infantry
- Crosse, Surgeon John Burton St. Croix 11th Hussars. Medical Staff
- Crowe, Captain Robert 93rd Regiment
- Cumberland, Captain Octavius. RN
- Cumming, Serjeant-Major George 57th Regiment
- Cunynghame, Colonel Arthur Augustus Thurlow, C.B. Staff (4TH CLASS)
- Cuppage, Brevet-Major John Macdonald 89th Regiment
- Curzon, Brevet-Lieutenant-Colonel the Honourable Leicester Rifle Brigade, Staff
- Dacres, Captain Sidney Colpoys C.B. RN (4TH CLASS)
- Dacres, Major-General Sir Richard James K.C.B. (3RD CLASS)
- Dallas, Brevet-Major George 46th Regiment
- Dalyell, Lieutenant Osborne William RN
- Daniel, Mr. Edward St. John V.C. RN
- Daniell, Major Charles Frederick Torrens Brigade-Major, 38th Regiment, Staff
- Darling, Assistant Commissary-General Montague William, Commissariat
- Daubeney, Lieutenant-Colonel Henry Charles Barnston C.B., 55th Regiment
- Daubeny, Brevet-Lieutenant-Colonel James 62nd Regiment
- Davie, Serjeant William 79th Regiment
- Dawkins, Captain and Lieutenant-Colonel William Gregory. Coldstream Guards
- Day, Commander George Fiott RN
- de Lisle, Surgeon Richard Francis Valpy 4th Regiment. Medical Staff
- de Morel, Major Charles Carew, Depot Battalion, Staff
- De Salis, Major and Brevet-Lieutenant-Colonel Rodolph, 8th Hussars. Cavalry

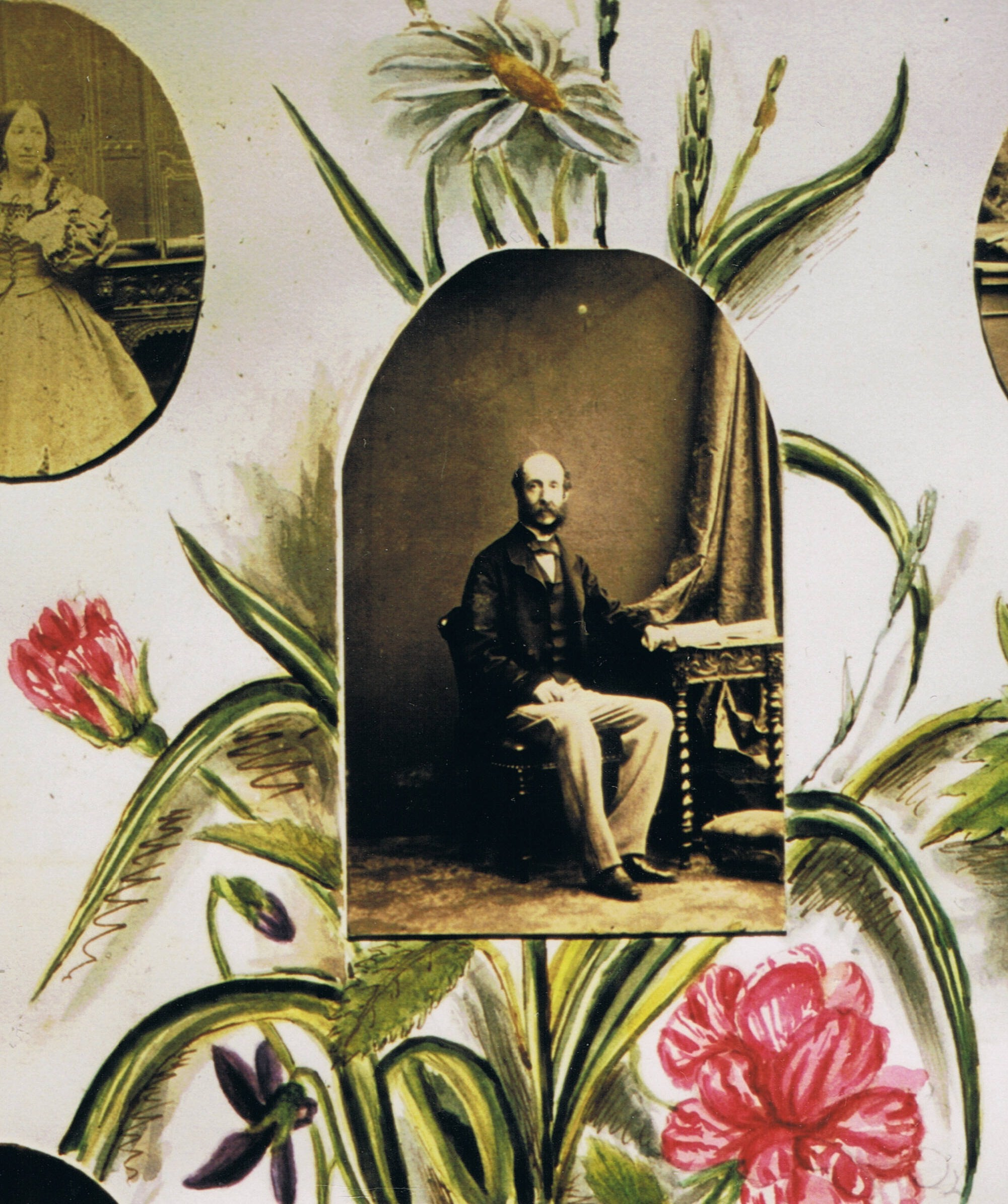
Count Rodolphus Johannes Leslie Hibernicus De Salis, CB (Dublin 1811-London 1880)

- De Vere, Brevet-Major Francis Horatio RE
- De Winton, Lieutenant Francis Walter. Royal Artillery
- Deas, Mr. David, C.B., Inspector of Hospitals and Fleets RN (4TH CLASS)
- Dench, Commander Charles Thomas. RN
- Derriman, Commander Samuel Hoskins. RN
- Devine, Serjeant John late Royal Artillery
- Devine, Serjeant-Conductor John. Royal Artillery
- Dewar, Brevet-Major James William 49th Regiment
- Dickson, Brevet-Major Philip. Royal Artillery
- Dickson, Colonel Collingwood C.B., Royal Artillery (advanced from 5th Class). (4TH CLASS)
- Dickson, Colonel Collingwood C.B., Royal Artillery, Staff
- Digby, Brevet-Major George Stephen Royal Marine Artillery RM
- Dixon, Brevet - Lieutenant - Colonel Matthew Charles Royal Artillery
- Dixon, Lieutenant-Colonel George, C.B., Depot Battalion, late 77th Regiment.
- Donnelly, Lieutenant John Fretcheville Dykes. RE
- Donovan, Major Edward Westby 33rd Regiment of Foot
- Douglas, First Lieutenant Archibald Alexander Royal Marine Artillery RM
- Douglas, Lieutenant-Colonel John C.B., 11th Hussars. Cavalry
- Dowbiggin, Major Montagu Hamilton, Unattached, Infantry
- Dowell, Commander William Montague RN
- Doyle, 2612 Drummer and Lance-Corporal Joseph. 55th Regiment
- D'Oyley, Brevet-Major Henry Torrens, 23rd Regiment, Staff
- Drake, Deputy Commissary - General William Henry C.B. Commissariat.
- Drake, Lieutenant John Mervin Cutcliffe. RE
- Drewe, Brevet-Major Francis Edward 23rd Regiment
- Drummond, Captain The Honourable James Robert C.B. RN (4TH CLASS)
- Drysdale, Captain John 42nd Regiment
- Dundas, Rear-Admiral the Hon. Sir Richard Saunders, K.C.B (2ND CLASS)
- Dundas, Vice-Admiral Sir James Whitley Deans G.C.B. RN (1st CLASS)
- Dunlop, Mr.George Greenirk Warrant Officer, Gunner RN
- Dupuis, Major-General John Edward C.B. Royal Artillery (3RD CLASS)
- Dwyer, Brevet-Major John, 14th Regiment
- Eagar, Major Robert John 31st Regiment
- Earle, Brevet-Major Arthur Maxwell Brigade-Major, 57th Regiment, Staff
- Edwards, Colonel Clement Alexander C.B., 18th Regiment
- Elles, Lieutenant William Kidston 38th Regiment
- Elliot, Senior Surgeon, Richard Coffin Ordnance Medical Department
- Elliott, 2616 Serjeant Hawthorn Christopher 63rd Regiment
- Elliott, Brevet-Major Alexander James Hardy, Aide-de-Camp, 5th Dragoon Guards Cavalry
- Ellison, Captain and Lieutenant-Colonel Cuthbert George Brigade-Major, Grenadier Guards, Staff
- Elmhirst, Lieutenant-Colonel Charles late 9th Regiment (Depot Battalion)
- Elmsall, Brevet-Major William de Cardonnel, 1st Royal Dragoons. Cavalry
- Elphinstone, Lieutenant Howard Craufurd. RE
- Elrington, Brevet-Lieutenant-Colonel Frederick Robert Rifle Brigade
- Elton, Brevet-Major Frederick Cockayne 55th Regiment
- Elton, Lieutenant Frederick Coulthurst. Royal Artillery
- England, Lieutenant-General Sir Richard G.C.B. (2ND CLASS)
- Evans, Lieutenant-General Sir De Lacy G.C.B. (2ND CLASS)
- Evans, Major William Edwyn late Land Transport Corps, Cavalry
- Evelegh, Lieutenant-Colonel Frederick Charles, 20th Regiment
- Evered, Lieutenant John Guy Courtenay RN
- Ewart, Brevet-Lieutenant-Colonel John Alexander 93rd Regiment
- Ewart, Brevet-Major Charles Brisbane, Royal Engineers
- Ewart, Captain Charles Joseph Frederick. RN
- Eyre, Major-General Sir William K.C.B. (3RD CLASS)
- Fair, Acting Assistant-Surgeon George M.D. Medical Staff
- Fairholme, Lieutenant Charles. RN
- Farren, Lieutenant-Colonel Richard Thomas C.B., 47th Regiment. (4TH CLASS)
- Fasson, Surgeon Stanhope Hunter, 95th Regiment, late Royal Artillery
- Feilding, Captain and Lieutenant-Colonel the Honourable Percy R. Basil Coldstream Guards, Staff
- Ferryman, Colonel Augustus Halifax C.B., 89th Regiment
- Festing, First Lieutenant Francis Worgan. RM
- Field, Brevet-Major George Thomas Assistant Quartermaster-General. Royal Artillery
- Fisher, Lieutenant Arthur A'Court. RE
- Fisher, Private John 89th Regiment.
- Fitzmayer, Colonel James William C.B. Royal Artillery (4TH CLASS)
- Fletcher, 2773 Corporal 23rd Regiment
- Foley, Lieutenant-Colonel the Honourable St. George Gerald C.B. Unattached, Staff (4TH CLASS)
- Forbes, Mr. Charles Raguenau Pecco RN
- Forsyth, Captain Gerard John 57th Regiment.
- Frampton, Major Heathfield James late 50th Regiment
- Fraser, Surgeon John M.D., Rifle Brigade. Medical Staff
- Freedman, Engineering Officer Israel Jacob, HM Mercantile Marine
- Frere, Captain John James Bartholomew Edward RN
- Fyers, Brevet-Major William Augustus 2nd Battalion Rifle Brigade
- Garden, Brevet-Major Henry Robert 77th Regiment
- Garrett, Colonel Robert 46th Regiment. (4TH CLASS)
- Gibbons, Assistant-Surgeon John 44th Regiment
- Gibbs, Gunner and Driver John 8th Company, 3rd Battalion. Royal Artillery
- Gillam, Serjeant David, 4th Light Dragoons. Cavalry
- Gillies, 1265 Colour-Serjeant William 1st Royals, 1st Battalion
- Gipps, Lieutenant and Captain and Brevet-Major Reginald Scots Fusilier Guards
- Gloag, Veterinary-Surgeon John William late 11th Hussars. Medical Staff
- Glyn, Brevet-Lieutenant-Colonel Julius Richard Brigade-Major, Rifle Brigade, Staff
- Goggins, 2453 Serjeant Thomas 88th Regiment
- Goodenough, Lieutenant-Colonel Arthur Cyril 34th Regiment
- Goodlake, Lieutenant and Captain and Brevet-Major Gerard Littlehales. Coldstream Guards
- Goodwyn, Lieutenant-Colonel Julius Edmund 41st Regiment
- Gordon, Major-General Charles George, (Gordon of Khartoum) appointed a Chevalier of the Legion of Honour by the Government of France on 16 July 1856
- Gordon, Brevet-Colonel the Hon. John William C.B., Quartermaster-Gen's Dept, Staff (4TH CLASS)
- Gordon, Brevet-Lieutenant-Colonel William 17th Regiment
- Gordon, Captain Sir William, Bart., 17th Lancers. Cavalry
- Gordon, Colonel Alexander Gordon RE
- Gordon, Colonel John William C.B., Royal Engineers
- Gordon, Commander William Everard Alphonso RN
- Gordon, Deputy Inspector-General Archibald M.D., C.B. Medical Staff
- Gordon, Lieutenant Charles George. RE
- Gough, Commander Frederick William RN
- Graham, Brevet-Major Lumley Unattached, infantry
- Graham, Lieutenant Gerald. RE
- Graham, Rear-Admiral Charles C.B. (4TH CLASS)
- Grant, Brevet-Major William James Esten Royal Artillery
- Grant, Lieutenant-Colonel John Thornton C.B., 49th Regiment (4TH CLASS)
- Grant, Serjeant John, 18th Regiment
- Gray, Trumpet-Major William 8th Hussars Cavalry
- Green, Brevet-Major Charles Mengaye 30th Regiment
- Grennan, 3257 Serjeant James 88th Regiment
- Greville, Rear-Admiral Henry Francis C.B. RN (4TH CLASS)
- Griffith, 2101 Serjeant William 57th Regiment
- Grove, Brevet-Lieutenant-Colonel Robert 90th Regiment
- Grylls, Commander Charles Gerveys RN
- Gubbins, Lieutenant Stamer 30th Regiment
- Gubbins, Major James, Unattached, Staff
- Guttridge, Troop Serjeant-Major George George, 11th Hussars. Cavalry
- Gwilt, Brevet-Lieutenant-Colonel John 34th Regiment
- Halkett, Lieutenant-Colonel James Coldstream Guards (lately on Staff duty at Strasbourg)
- Hall, Lieutenant William James. Royal Artillery
- Hall, Sir John K.C.B., M.D., Inspector-General of Hospitals, Staff (4TH CLASS)
- Hallewell, Brevet-Lieutenant-Colonel Edmund Gilling Asst Quartermaster-Gen, Unattached, Staff
- Hallowes, Lieutenant Frederick William RN
- Haly, Colonel William O'Grady, C.B., 47th Regiment. (4TH CLASS)
- Hamilton, Brevet-Colonel Frederick William. Grenadier Guards (4TH CLASS)
- Hamilton, Captain Thomas De Courcy, 23rd Regiment
- Hamilton, Mr. William Paymaster RN
- Hamley, Brevet-Lieutenant-Colonel Edward Bruce Royal Artillery
- Hanlan, Peter A.B., " Curlew." RN
- Harding, Brevet-Lieutenant-Colonel Francis Pym ADC & Asst Adjutant-General, 22nd Regiment, Staff
- Hardinge, Commander Edward RN
- Hardinge, Lieutenant-Colonel Hon. Arthur Edward, Asst QM-Gen, Coldstream Guards, Staff
- Harger, Mr. Frank Paymaster RN
- Hargreaves, Corporal John 4th Company, 12th Battalion. Royal Artillery
- Harries, Brevet Lieutenant-Colonel Thomas 63rd Regiment
- Harris, Lieutenant Noel Hamlyn. Royal Artillery
- Hay, Lieutenant-Colonel Alexander Sebastian Leith 93rd Regiment.
- Hay, Captain Lord John C.B. RN
- Hayles, Mr. John Warrant Officer, Gunner RN
- Hayman, Brevet-Major Matthew Jones, 18th Regiment
- Hayman, Mr. William, Carpenter, Warrant Officer RN
- Hayward, Mr. Charles Augustus. RN
- Heath, Captain Leopold George C.B. RN
- Hendry, Gunner and Driver William 1st Company, 12th Battalion. Royal Artillery
- Henry, Lieutenant-Colonel Francis William, Lord Burghersh, C.B., Coldstream Guards, Staff
- Herbert, Colonel Honourable Percy Egerton C.B. Quartermaster-General, Staff (4TH CLASS)
- Herbert, Corporal Henry 5th Dragoon Guards Cavalry
- Herbert, Lieutenant-Colonel Arthur James (now holding Unattached Substantive Rank.) Infantry
- Hewett, First Lieutenant Henry. RM
- Hewett, Lieutenant William Nathan Wright RN
- Hibbert, Brevet-Major Hugh John, 7th Regiment
- Hickes, Lieutenant Henry John Foquett Ellis. Royal Artillery
- Higginson, Brevet-Lieutenant-Colonel George Wentworth Alexander. Grenadier Guards
- Hillyar, Captain Henry Schank C.B. RN
- Hodge, Colonel Edward Cooper C.B., 4th Dragoon Guards. (4TH CLASS)
- Hodgson, Brevet-Major William Chanval 79th Regiment
- Holloway, Lieutenant-Colonel Thomas RM (4TH CLASS)
- Hope, Brevet-Major John Edward. Royal Artillery
- Hope, Major William 71st Regiment
- Hopkins, Brevet-Lieutenant-Colonel William Friend RM
- Horn, Colonel Frederick, C.B., 20th Regiment (4TH CLASS)
- Horner, Serjeant Charles Royal Marine Artillery RM
- Horton, Commander William RN
- Hudson, Lieutenant Joseph Samuel. RN
- Huey, Colonel Richard William, half-pay, 1st Foot
- Hume, Brevet-Major Gustavus ADC & Deputy-Asst Adjutant-General, 38th Regiment, Staff
- Hume, Brevet-Major Robert 55th Regiment
- Hume, Captain John Richard 55th Regiment
- Hume, Lieutenant-Colonel Henry C.B., 95th Regiment
- Hunt, Colour-Serjeant Joseph 4th Regiment
- Hunt, Deputy Assistant-Commissary Arthur. Royal Artillery
- Hunter, Brevet-Major Fitzwilliam Frederick 47th Regiment
- Hunter, Captain Edward Henry 62nd Regiment
- Hunter, Lieutenant James Edward. RN
- Hurdle, Colonel Thomas C.B. RM (4TH CLASS)
- Hurt, Captain Charles 1st Royals, 1st Battalion
- Image, Captain John George 21st Regiment
- Ingall, Lieutenant-Colonel "William Lenox, C.B., 62nd Regiment
- Inglis, Brevet-Lieutenant-Colonel William 57th Regiment
- Ingram, Lieutenant-Colonel Thomas Onslow 97th Regiment
- Irwin, Mr. Ahrnuty Medical Officer RN
- Jarvis, Colour-Serjeant George No. 1,873. Royal Sappers and Miners
- Jeeves, Assistant-Surgeon William Younge 38th Regiment
- Jeffreys, Serjeant Richard 6th Inniskilling. Cavalry
- Jenkins, Mr. James M.D., Surgeon RN
- Jobberns, Serjeant-Major Joseph 39th Regiment
- Jocelyn, Captain and Lieutenant-Colonel Honourable John Strange. Scots Fusilier Guards
- Johnson, Regimental Serjeant - Major Thomas George, 13th Light Dragoons Cavalry
- Jolliffe, Commander William Kynaston. RN
- Jolliffe, First Lieutenant Charles. RM
- Jones, Captain Henry Mitchell 7th Regiment
- Jones, Captain Lewis Tobias C.B RN (4TH CLASS)
- Jones, Commander William Gore RN
- Jones, Major-General Sir Harry David K.C.B. (3RD CLASS)
- Jordan, Serjeant John RM
- Jull, First Lieutenant Harrisson John Royal Marine Artillery RM
- Keppel, Captain the Hon. Henry, C.B. RN (3RD CLASS)
- Kellaway, Mr. Joseph Warrant Officer, Boatswain RN
- Kelly, 2730 Corporal Thomas 48th Regiment
- Kelly, Lieutenant-Colonel Richard Dennis 34th Regiment
- Kennedy, Captain John James RN
- Kennedy, Lieutenant Andrew James RN
- Kerr, Serjeant-Conductor George, 12th Battalion. Royal Artillery
- Kerr, Thomas Gunner Royal Marine Artillery RM
- Keyle, Serjeant William, 1st Royal Dragoons. Cavalry
- Killeen, Captain Roger, 21st Regiment
- King, Brevet-Lieutenant-Colonel John Hynde 49th Regiment
- King, Captain George St. Vincent C.B. RN (4TH CLASS)
- King, Major George, 13th Regiment
- King, Lieutenant Augustus Henry. Royal Artillery
- Knox, Colour-Serjeant Alexander 93rd Regiment
- Knox, Lieutenant John Simpson 2nd Battalion Rifle Brigade
- Kynaston, Captain Augustus Frederick C.B. RN
- Lake, Colonel Henry Atwell C.B., Unattached. (4TH CLASS)
- Lake, Colonel Noel Thomas C.B., Royal Artillery. (4TH CLASS)
- Lamb, Captain George Henry late 49th Regiment
- Lambert, Captain Rowley RN
- Landry, Cornet John, late Serjeant, No. 1176, Land Transport Corps
- Langley, Mr. John Henry Engineer RN
- Lawless, 1886 Colour-Serjeant Peter 97th Regiment.
- Lawrence, Colonel Arthur Johnstone C.B., Rifle Brigade. (4TH CLASS)
- Leckie, Brevet-Major William 39th Regiment
- Leet, Lieutenant Henry Knox RN
- Legh, Brevet - Lieutenant - Colonel Edmund Cornwall 97th Regiment
- Leitch, Serjeant Peter No. 763. Royal Sappers and Miners
- Lendrim VC, Corporal William, Royal Sappers and Miners
- Lewes, Major John, Unattached, late 3rd Regiment
- Ligertwood, Second Class Staff-Surgeon Thomas M.B., late 40th Regiment Medical Staff
- Lilley, Deputy Assistant-Commissary John Isaac. Royal Artillery
- Lillingston, Lieutenant Neale Dottin Foveran RN
- Lindsay, Lieutenant and Captain Robert James Scots Fusilier Guards
- Line, 3313 Serjeant James 21st Regiment
- Llewellyn, Mr. Frederick Robert Glyndwr RN
- Lloyd, Commander Henry RN
- Lloyd, Lieutenant-Colonel Edward Thomas, Royal Engineers
- Lock, Brevet-Major Andrew Campbell Knox 50th Regiment
- Lockwood, Surgeon Augustus Purefoy late 7th Regiment. Medical Staff
- Lockyer, Colonel Henry Frederick, C.B., K.H., 97th Regiment. (4TH CLASS)
- Longley, Lieutenant Raynsford Cytherus. Royal Artillery
- Longmore, Surgeon Thomas 19th Regiment. Medical Staff
- Low, Major and Brevet-Lieutenant-Colonel Alexander, 4th Light Dragoons. Cavalry
- Lowndes, Brevet Lieutenant-Colonel John Henry 47th Regiment.
- Lucan, Major-General the Earl of Lucan, K.C.B. (3RD CLASS)
- Luce, Commander John Proctor RN
- Lukin, Brevet-Major William Windham Augustus Royal Artillery
- Lumley, Brevet-Major Charles Henry 97th Regiment.
- Lushington, Rear-Admiral Sir Stephen, K.C.B (3RD CLASS)
- Lyons, 1651 Private John, 19th Regiment
- Lyons, Admiral Lord G.C.B. (1ST CLASS)
- Lyons, Lieutenant James. Royal Artillery
- Lysons, Colonel Daniel C.B., 23rd Regiment. (4TH CLASS)
- Mac Mahon, Brevet-Lieutenant-Colonel William 44th Regiment
- Macdonald, Colour-Serjeant Henry No. 237. Royal Sappers and Miners
- Macdonald, Lieutenant-Colonel the Honourable James William Bosville C.B., Unattached, Staff
- Macdonald, Serjeant John, 14th Regiment
- Macdonnell, Brevet-Lieutenant-Colonel Alexander C.B., 2nd Battalion Rifle Brigade
- Mackenzie, Brevet-Lieutenant-Colonel Kenneth Douglas Asst QM Gen, 92nd Regiment, Staff
- Mackenzie, Brevet-Major Roderick Royal Artillery
- Mackinnon, Assistant-Surgeon William Alexander 42nd Regiment
- Mackinnon, Surgeon David Reid 21st Regiment. Medical Staff
- Macpherson, Colour-Serjeant Angus 50th Regiment
- Mainprise, Mr. William Thomas RN
- Maitland, Lieutenant Horatio Laurence Arthur Lennox RN
- Maitland, Lieutenant-Colonel Charles Lennox Brownlow Dep Asst QM- Gen, Grenadier Guards, Staff
- Major, William, Quartermaster, " Ardent." RN
- March, Brevet-Major William Henry RM
- Margesson, Captain William George 56th Regiment
- Markham, Lieutenant Edwin. Royal Artillery
- Marlow, Surgeon Benjamin William M.D., 28th Regiment. Medical Staff
- Marryat, Commander Joseph Henry RN
- Martin, Lieutenant Charles Nassau. RE
- Mason, Richard Denton, M.D. Medical Officer RN
- Massey, Brevet-Major Hon. Eyre Challoner Henry 95th Regiment
- Massey, Lieutenant William Godfrey Dunham, 19th Regiment
- Massy, Major Godfrey William Hugh Unattached. Infantry
- Matthew, First Class Surgeon Thomas Patrick Medical Staff
- Maude, Brevet - Lieutenant - Colonel Frederick Francis, 3rd Regiment
- Mauleverer, Lieutenant-Colonel James- Thomas C.B., 30th Regiment (4TH CLASS)
- Maxwell, Brevet-Lieutenant-Colonel Edward Herbert 88th Regiment
- Maxwell, Lieutenant - Colonel George Vaughan C.B., 88th Regiment, Staff
- Maxwell, Lieutenant Stuart. Royal Artillery
- Maxwell, Lieutenant-Colonel Alexander 46th Regiment
- Mayne, Lieutenant R.C. RN (LG 10 Jul 1857)
- Mayow, Brevet-Lieutenant-Colonel George Wynell, Unattached, Asst Quartermaster-Gen, Staff
- McCall, Brevet-Lieutenant-Colonel William 79th Regiment
- McCormick, 2422 Private John 30th Regiment
- McGee, Lieutenant-Colonel Henry Edward Unattached. Infantry
- McGowan, Private John 63rd Regiment
- McKay, 2908 Serjeant William. 33rd Regiment of Foot
- McKenna, Captain Theobald 1st Royals, 2nd Battalion
- McKenzie, Commander John Francis Campbell RN
- McKillop, Commander Henry Frederick RN
- McLeod, Captain John Chetham 42nd Regiment
- McMurdo, Colonel William Montagu Scott Director-Gen Land Transport Corps, Staff (4TH CLASS)
- McPherson, Colonel Philip C.B., late 17th Regiment, Inspecting Field Officer
- M'Creagh, Captain Michael, 4th Dragoon Guards. Cavalry
- McVeigh, Gunner and Driver John 4th Company, 11th Battalion. Royal Artillery
- Mends, Captain William Robert C.B. RN (4TH CLASS)
- Mervin, Quartermaster-Serjeant George, Royal Horse Artillery
- Michell, Rear-Admiral Frederick Thomas, C.B (4TH CLASS)
- Milestone, George A.B., " Weser." RN
- Miller, Brevet-Major Frederick. Royal Artillery
- Mitchell, Commander Alfred RN
- Mitchell, Company Serjeant Joseph 6th Company, 11th Battalion. Royal Artillery
- Mitchell, Serjeant Thomas 2nd Company, 8th Battalion. Royal Artillery
- Montagu, Brevet-Major Horace William RE
- Moorsom, Captain William C.B RN (4TH CLASS)
- Morris, Brevet-Lieutenant-Colonel William C.B., Deputy-Asst Quartermaster-Gen, 17th Lancers, Staff
- Morris, Lieutenant-Colonel C.H. Royal Artillery (4TH CLASS) (LG 6 Jul 1860)
- Mortimer, Serjeant-Major John, 34th Regiment
- Mouat, Deputy Inspector-General James M.D., C.B. Medical Staff
- Moubray, Brevet-Major Edward Royal Artillery
- Muir, Mr. George William Clerk's Assistant RN
- Muir, Surgeon William Mure M.D., 33rd Regiment of Foot, Medical Staff
- Mundy, Lieutenant-Colonel George Valentine C.B., 33rd Regiment of Foot
- Munro, Lieutenant-Colonel William 39th Regiment
- Murdoch, Mr. George Engineer RN
- Murphy, 1174 Serjeant Timothy 1st Battalion Rifle Brigade
- Nagle, Serjeant-Major Richard 30th Regiment
- Neville, Captain and Lieutenant-Colonel Edward, Scots Fusilier Guards, Staff
- Neville, Lieutenant Glastonbury. RE
- Newby, Mr. Matthew, Boatswain. Warrant Officer RN
- Newdegate, Brevet-Major Edward Rifle Brigade
- Newman, Private Joseph 62nd Regiment
- Noddall, Mr. Cornelius Thomas Augustus RN
- Norcott, Colonel William Sherbrooke Ramsay, C.B., Depot Bn, late of the Rifle Brigade. (4TH CLASS)
- Norton, Serjeant-Major William. Royal Artillery
- O'Callaghan, Acting Assistant-Surgeon Charles, Medical Staff
- Ogden, 2330 Private John 23rd Regiment
- Oldfield, Commander Radulphus Bryce RN
- O'Neill, Serjeant James 41st Regiment
- Orlebar, Captain Orlando Robert Harnond 28th Regiment
- Osborn, Assistant Commissary-General Kean, Commissariat
- Osborn, Captain Sherard C.B. RN (4TH CLASS)
- Osborn, John Private RM
- Owen, Brevet-Lieutenant-Colonel Henry Charles Cunliffe C.B., Royal Engineers (4TH CLASS)
- Owen, Brevet-Major Charles Henry. Royal Artillery
- Pack, Brevet-Lieutenant-Colonel Arthur John, half-pay, 7th Regiment
- Paget, Colonel Lord George Augustus Frederick C.B. Cavalry (4TH CLASS)
- Pakenham, Colonel the Honourable William Lygon C.B., Adjutant-General, Staff (4TH CLASS)
- Palmer, Lieutenant Charles Frederic RN
- Park, 2nd Class Staff- Surgeon Thomas late Royal Artillery.
- Parke, Lieutenant-Colonel William 72nd Regiment
- Parker, Mr. William Henessey RN
- Parsons, Lieutenant George RN
- Paton, Captain James, 4th Regiment
- Paul, Corporal John No. 1,119. Royal Sappers and Miners
- Paul, Mr. Henry. RN
- Paulet, Colonel Lord William C.B. Infantry (4TH CLASS)
- Paulet, Major and Colonel Lord Frederick Coldstream Guards, Staff (4TH CLASS)
- Paulet, Rear-Admiral Lord George C.B. RN (4TH CLASS)
- Pearson, Lieutenant Thomas Livingstone RN
- Peel, Captain William, C.B. RN (4TH CLASS)
- Pennefather, Major-General Sir John Lysaght KC.B. (2ND CLASS)
- Percy, Brevet-Colonel the Honourable Hugh Manvers. Grenadier Guards
- Percy, Serjeant William, 4th Dragoon Guards. Cavalry
- Pitman, First Lieutenant William. RM
- Plant, Serjeant John, 17th Regiment
- Plunkett, Brevet-Lieutenant-Colonel the Honourable Charles Dawson, 1st Royals, 1st Battalion
- Porteous, Commander Francis Pender. RN
- Potter, Mr. Thomas RN
- Powell, Captain Richard Ashmore C.B. RN
- Preston, Brevet-Major Richard 44th Regiment
- Pretyman, Brevet-Major William 33rd Regiment of Foot
- Price, Lieutenant John Andrew. Royal Artillery
- Pritchard, Commander Samuel RN
- Pym, First Lieutenant Frederick George RM
- Pym, Lieutenant William Henry. RN
- Quayle, Brevet-Major John Edward Taubman 33rd Regiment of Foot
- Raby, Commander Henry James RN
- Raines, 27 10 Private James 7th Regiment
- Randolph, Captain George Granville RN
- Rant, Troop-Serjeant-Major William, 2nd Royal Dragoons. Cavalry
- Ready, Lieutenant-Colonel Charles 71st Regiment.
- Rees, Mr. John, Deputy Inspector of Hospitals and Fleets RN
- Regan, Private Thomas 50th Regiment
- Reilly, Brevet-Major William Edmund Moyses Royal Artillery
- Reynolds, Mr. William Vernon Eliakim. Medical Officer RN
- Richards, Brevet-Major William Powell. Royal Artillery
- Richards, Serjeant Edwin RM
- Rickard, William Quartermaster, " Weser." RN
- Rickman, Major William Unattached, late 77th Regiment
- Rideout, Lieutenant Arthur. Royal Artillery
- Ridley, Major and Colonel Charles William Grenadier Guards (4TH CLASS)
- Riky, Colonel Benjamin 48th Regiment
- Robarts, Mr. John Warrant Officer, Gunner RN
- Roberts, Brevet-Major William 28th Regiment
- Roberts, First Lieutenant Henry Bradley. RM
- Roberts, Mr. Robert Wilson RN
- Robertson, Brevet-Major Patrick, 4th Regiment
- Robinson, Brevet-Major John 44th Regiment
- Rodney, Captain George Brydges RM
- Roe, Lieutenant and Adjutant George Noble, 3rd Regiment
- Rogers, Captain Henry Downing C.B. RN
- Rokeby, Major-General Lord K.C.B. (3RD CLASS)
- Rolland, Commander William Rae RN
- Rollo, Lieutenant-Colonel the Honourable Robert Unattached. Infantry
- Rooke, Lieutenant-Colonel John Lewis Richard, 19th Regiment
- Rose, Major-General Sir Hugh Henry K.C.B. (3RD CLASS)
- Ross, Commander John Francis. RN
- Rowe, George, Boatswain's Mate, " Vesuvius." RN
- Rowe, Mr. Richard Warrant Officer, Gunner RN
- Rowlands, Brevet-Major Hugh 41st Regiment
- Ruck-Keene, Lieutenant John Edward. Royal Artillery
- Rule, 2760 Serjeant Arthur, 20th Regiment
- Rumble, Mr. William Engineer RN
- Russell, Brevet-Major Sir Charles, Bart. Grenadier Guards
- Russell, Rear-Admiral Lord Edward C.B. RN (4TH CLASS)
- Ryder, Serjeant William, 9th Regiment
- Sackville, Colonel Charles Richard, Lord West, C.B. (4TH CLASS)
- Sanctuary, Lieutenant William Melancthon. RN
- Sandwith, Humphry Esq., M.D., C.B.
- Sargent, Major John Neptune Unattached, late 95th Regiment
- Saxe-Weimar, Brevet-Colonel Prince Edward of Saxe-Weimar, Grenadier Guards, Staff
- Sayer, Captain F. 23rd Fusiliers (LG 22 Dec 1857)
- Scarlett, Major-General The Hon. Sir James Yorke K.C.B. (3RD CLASS)
- Scott, 1510 Private John 38th Regiment
- Scott, Captain Hopton Bassett, 9th Regiment
- Scrase Dickins, Captain Compton Alwyne 38th Regiment
- Selby, Lieutenant William Derenzy Donaldson RN
- Sexton, Lieutenant and Adjutant John 95th Regiment
- Seymour, Brevet-Colonel Francis Scots Fusilier Guards. (4TH CLASS)
- Shadwell, Brevet-Lieutenant-Colonel Lawrence ADC & Asst Quartermaster-Gen, Unattached, Staff
- Shepherd, John Boatswain's Mate, "Royal Albert." RN
- Shewell, Colonel Frederick George C.B., 8th Hussars Cavalry (4TH CLASS)
- Shields, 2945 Corporal Robert 23rd Regiment
- Shirley, Colonel Horatio C.B., 88th Regiment. (4TH CLASS)
- Shuckburgh, Brevet-Major George Thomas Francis late Scots Fusilier Guards
- Shute, Major and Brevet-Lieutenant-Colonel Charles Cameron, 6th Inniskilling. Cavalry
- Sibthorp, Brevet-Lieutenant-Colonel Richard Francis Waldo 97th Regiment.
- Simmons, Colonel J.L.A. Royal Engineers (4TH CLASS) (LG 23 Mar 1858)
- Simpson, 3030 Private William 46th Regiment
- Simpson, Brevet-Lieutenant-Colonel John 34th Regiment
- Simpson, Brevet-Major William Henry Randolph Royal Artillery
- Simpson, General Sir James G.C.B. (1ST CLASS)
- Simpson, Mr. David James RN
- Sinclair, Lieutenant Gordon Cornwallis RN
- Singleton, Brevet-Major John. Royal Artillery
- Skipwith, Major George Unattached, Infantry
- Sladden, Colour-Sergeant Henry 23rd Regiment
- Smaller, 2921 Serjeant Joseph 90th Regiment
- Smart, Mr. William Richard Edwin M.D., Surgeon RN
- Smith, 2632 Private Charles 28th Regiment
- Smith, Brevet-Lieutenant-Colonel Hugh 3rd Regiment, Asst Adjutant-General, Staff
- Smith, Brevet-Lieutenant-Colonel Thomas 90th Regiment
- Smith, Deputy Commissary-General John William C.B. Commissariat
- Smith, Lieutenant-Colonel John William Sidney 38th Regiment
- Smyth, Lieutenant-Colonel Henry C.B, 23rd Regiment (4TH CLASS)
- Somerset, Lieutenant-Colonel Edward Arthur 1st Battalion Rifle Brigade
- Sparks, Lieutenant-Colonel James Pattoun C.B., 38th Regiment. (4TH CLASS)
- Spence, Major Frederick 31st Regiment
- Spencer, Colonel Honourable Augustus Almeric (16 June 1856) C.B., 44th Regiment. (4TH CLASS)
- Spilsbury, Mr. Robert Warrant Officer, Boatswain RN
- Spratt, Captain Thomas Abel Brimage C.B. RN (4TH CLASS)
- Spurway, Brevet-Major John. Royal Artillery
- St. George, Colonel John C.B. Royal Artillery (4TH CLASS)
- Stait, 2465 Colour-Serjeant William 23rd Regiment
- Stanton, Brevet-Lieutenant-Colonel Edward RE
- Stanton, Colour-Serjeant Joseph No. 861. Royal Sappers and Miners
- Starr, First Lieutenant Edward Henderson RM
- Staunton, Colonel George 31st Regiment
- Steele, Brevet-Colonel Thomas Montagu C.B., Military Sec, Coldstream Guards, Staff (4TH CLASS)
- Steele, First Lieutenant Arthur Charles Royal Marine Artillery RM
- Steevens, Brevet-Major Nathaniel 88th Regiment
- Stephenson, Captain and Lieutenant-Colonel Frederick Charles Arthur Scots Fusilier Guards
- Sterling, Lieutenant-Colonel Anthony C.B. Assistant Adjutant-General, Staff (4TH CLASS)
- Stevenson, Brevet-Major Charles Aldersey 47th Regiment
- Stevenson, Corporal John, H. Battery. Royal Artillery
- Stewart, Rear-Admiral Sir Houston, K.C.B. (2ND CLASS)
- Stirling, Lieutenant William. Royal Artillery
- Stockey, Lance-Corporal Peter 41st Regiment
- Stockley, Veterinary-Surgeon John Surtees Royal Artillery
- Stone, 2139 Private Peter John 97th Regiment
- Stopford, Rear-Admiral the Honourable Sir Montagu K.C.B. RN (3RD CLASS)
- Strange, Brevet-Lieutenant-Colonel Henry Francis C.B. Royal Artillery
- Strangways, Lieutenant Walter Aston Fox. Royal Artillery
- Straton, Lieutenant-Colonel Robert Jocelyn C.B., 77th Regiment
- Strong, Captain and Lieutenant-Colonel Clement William. Coldstream Guards
- Sulivan, Brevet-Lieutenant-Colonel George Augustus Filmer 2nd Royal Dragoons. Cavalry
- Sullivan, Colonel William, C.B., Unattached, Staff
- Sullivan, John Captain of Afterguard, " Rodney." RN
- Sylvester, Second Class Staff-Surgeon Henry Thomas, M.D. 23rd Regiment. Medical Staff
- Tatham, Captain Edward. RN
- Taylor, Assistant-Surgeon Arthur Henry. Royal Artillery
- Taylor, John Captain of Forecastle, " London." RN
- Teesdale, Lieutenant Christopher Charles C.B., Royal Artillery (4TH CLASS)
- Templeman, Captain Alfred 21st Regiment
- Thackwell, Brevet-Lieutenant-Colonel Joseph Edwin Asst Adjutant-Gen, Unattached, Staff
- Thellusson, Major Alexander Dalton 72nd Regiment
- Thimbleby, Private Robert 44th Regiment
- Thompson, Captain William Dalrymple, 17th Regiment
- Thompson, Lieutenant Sackville William Henniker. RN
- Thompson, Major George Latham Deputy-Assistant Adjutant-General, 4th Regiment, Staff
- Thorne, Mr. Edward. Paymaster RN
- Tillard, Lieutenant Henry Percy. Royal Artillery
- Tinley, Lieutenant-Colonel Robert Newport Cape Mounted Rifles, late 39th Regiment
- Tippinge, Brevet-Major Alfred Grenadier Guards
- Todd, Captain James Arphibald Ruddell 1st Royals, 1st Battalion
- Todd, Gunner and Driver William 6th Company, 11th Battalion. Royal Artillery
- Torriano, Lieutenant Charles Edward. Royal Artillery
- Toseland, Ensign and Adjutant George, late 33rd Regiment of Foot
- Tower, Lieutenant and Captain Harvey, Coldstream Guards
- Travers, Lieutenant Joseph Gates, 17th Regiment
- Tremayne, Brevet-Major Arthur 13th Light Dragoons Cavalry
- Trewavas, Joseph Ordinary Seaman, V.C., " Agamemnon" RN
- Trollope, Colonel Charles C.B., 62nd Regiment. (4TH CLASS)
- Troubridge, Colonel Sir Thomas St. Vincent Hope Cochrane, Bart., C.B., late 7th Regiment
- Tucker, Lieutenant Aubrey Harvey 23rd Regiment
- Turner, Brevet-Lieutenant-Colonel William West, C.B., Unattached, Infantry
- Turner, Brevet-Major John C.B. Royal Artillery
- Turner, Deputy Commissary-General Philip, Commissariat
- Twigger, Sergeant John William, Royal Air Force
- Tylor, Captain George Henry, 13th Regiment
- Tyrrwhitt, Colonel Charles Unattached, Staff
- Upton, Colonel the Honourable George Frederick C.B. Coldstream Guards (4TH CLASS)
- Urmston, Commander William Brabazon RN
- Vacher, Brevet-Major Frederick Smith Deputy-Asst Quartermaster-General, 33rd Regiment of Foot, Staff
- Van Straubenzee, Colonel Charles Thomas 3rd Regiment (4TH CLASS)
- Vaughan, Lieutenant Ernest Courtenay. Royal Artillery
- Verey, Mr. Richard Warrant Officer, Gunner RN
- Villiers, Brevet Lieutenant-Colonel James 47th Regiment
- Villiers, Brevet-Major Charles Courtney 47th Regiment
- Waddy, Lieutenant-Colonel Richard C.B., 50th Regiment
- Walker, Colonel Edward Walter Forestier C.B., Scots Fusilier Guards (4TH CLASS)
- Waller, Lieutenant George Henry 7th Regiment
- Walsh, Mr. James M.D., Surgeon RN
- Ward, Surgeon William Pearson, 17th Regiment, late Royal Artillery
- Warde, Colonel Edward Charles C.B. Royal Artillery (4TH CLASS)
- Warden, Brevet-Lieuteuant-Colonel Robert, 19th Regiment
- Wardlaw, Lieutenant-Colonel Robert, 1st Royal Dragoons. Cavalry
- Warren, Colonel Charles C.B., 55th Regiment (4TH CLASS)
- Watt, Colour-Serjeant Thomas, 4th Regiment
- Wells, Brevet-Major Frederick 1st Royals, 1st Battalion
- Werge, Major Henry Reynolds Unattached. Infantry
- West, Major Frederick 48th Regiment.
- Wetherall, Brevet-Colonel Edward Robert Asst Quartermaster-General, Unattached, Staff
- Wheatley, Bombardier Hugh 6th Company, 12th Battalion. Royal Artillery
- Wheeldon, George, Tank Crewman
- Wheatley, Private Francis 1st Battalion Rifle Brigade
- White, Lieutenant-Colonel Henry Dalrymple C.B., 6th Dragoons. Cavalry
- Whitmore, Lieutenant-Colonel Edmund Augustus Depot Battalion, late 30th Regiment, Staff
- Whyte, Commander John William RN
- Wilbraham, Colonel Richard C. B., Assistant Adjutant-General, Staff (4TH CLASS)
- Wilkinson, Thomas Bombardier Royal Marine Artillery RM
- Willes, Captain George Oniniauney RN
- Williams, Lieutenant-Colonel Thomas, 4th Regiment
- Williams, Major-General Sir William Fenwick, of Kars, Bart., K.C.B. (2ND CLASS)
- Williams, Mr. George RN : HMS Miranda : White Sea (Kola), Black Sea and Sea of Azoff.
- Willis, Brevet-Lieutenant-Colonel George Harry Smith Deputy-Asst QM-Gen, 77th Regiment, Staff
- Willis, Charles Captain of Afterguard, " Agamemnon." RN
- Wilson, Colour-Serjeant John 47th Regiment
- Wilton, Lieutenant-Colonel John Lucas 50th Regiment
- Windham, Major-General Charles Ash C.B. (3RD CLASS)
- Wodehouse, Lieutenant-Colonel Edwin C.B. Royal Artillery
- Wolseley, Captain Garnet Joseph 90th Regimont
- Wood, Colonel David Edward C.B. Royal Artillery (4TH CLASS)
- Wood, Lieutenant and Adjutant William 42nd Regiment
- Wood, Lieutenant-Colonel John Stewart C.B., Assistant Adjutant-General, Unattached, Staff
- Wood, Mr. Henry Evelyn RN
- Woodford, Brevet-Lieutenant-Colonel Charles John Deputy-Asst QM-Gen, Rifle Brigade, Staff
- Wyatt, Assistant-Surgeon John Coldstream Guards. Medical Staff
- Young, Commissary William. Royal Artillery
- Young, Lieutenant and Adjutant James 79th Regiment
- Yule, Serjeant George Royal Marine Artillery RM

=== Other British Recipients ===
- Mr Neville Thornton was born in England but educated in France. He was selected by the War Office in Paris to work in the Crimea as an interpreter for the Commissariat Department aged 16 years, in the rank of sub-lieutenant. At his own request he was transferred to the Algerian Tirailleurs where he accompanied Colonel De Brancion during the assault on the Malakoff. When the Colonel was killed Thornton picked up a flag and led the attack until he was shot through the groin. In recognition of his conspicuous act of bravery Thornton received the Légion d'Honneur and was appointed a Lieutenant of Chasseurs by the Emperor.

== See also ==
- Crimean War
- List of recipients of the Légion d'Honneur
- List of Crimean War Victoria Cross recipients
- Crimean War medals
