= Wingfield, Wiltshire =

Village in Wiltshire, England

Coordinates: 51.309°N 2.255°W

Wingfield
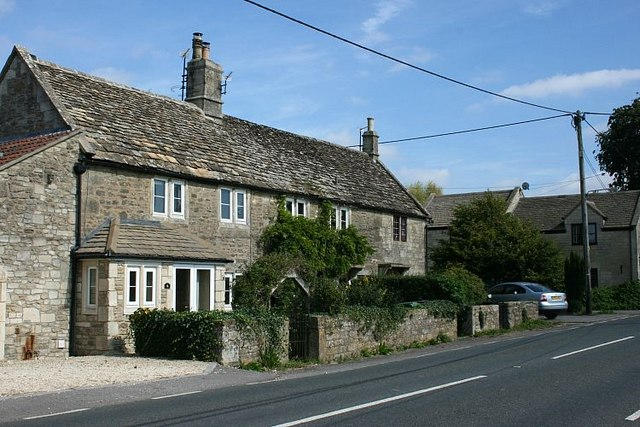
- Cottages on the A366

- Location within Wiltshire
- Population: 321 (in 2011)
- OS grid reference: ST823567
- Civil parish: Wingfield
- Unitary authority: Wiltshire
- Ceremonial county: Wiltshire
- Region: South West
- Country: England
- Sovereign state: United Kingdom
- Post town: Trowbridge
- Postcode district: BA14
- Dialling code: 01225
- Police: Wiltshire
- Fire: Dorset and Wiltshire
- Ambulance: South Western
- UK Parliament: Melksham and Devizes
- Website: Parish Council

Wingfield is a small village and civil parish in the county of Wiltshire, England, about 2.5 miles (4.0 km) south of Bradford-on-Avon and 2.2 miles (3.5 km) west of Trowbridge.

The parish is bordered to the east by the Trowbridge urban area and to the west by the county of Somerset, where the River Frome forms most of the boundary. The secondary road from Bradford-on-Avon to Rode (Somerset) crosses the A366 from Trowbridge to Farleigh Hungerford near the centre of the parish, and most of the dwellings are near this junction.

== History ==
Wingfield is mentioned in a charter of 954. Domesday Book in 1086 recorded a settlement named Winefel in Bradford hundred with 12 households and a mill, on land held by Geoffrey, bishop of Coutances. From at least the early 13th century until the Dissolution, Wingfield manor was linked to Keynsham Abbey. Thereafter the manor was granted to Thomas Bayley, whose heirs held it until 1647; the Wiltshire Victoria County History has an account of later owners.

The name "Winkfield" or "Winkfield with Rowley" was used in the 19th century. The Imperial Gazetteer in the 1870s has "Wingfield, or Winkfield, a parish, with Rowley tything". In 1934 the civil parish gained 532 acres on the abolition of Bradford Without parish, and a further 62 acres were transferred from Trowbridge.

=== Wittenham and Rowley ===
A manor called Wittenham in the west of the present parish is mentioned in 1001, and in Domesday Book Withenham is also held by Geoffrey. Rowley was either an alternative name or a separate manor nearby. A church dedicated to St Nicholas was last mentioned in 1535. By 1428 the population was low, and Walter, Lord Hungerford of Farleigh Castle obtained permission to unite the ecclesiastical parish with that of Farleigh Hungerford. Today the location of Wittenham village is unknown; since 1777 the land has been part of the Iford estate.

== Notable buildings ==
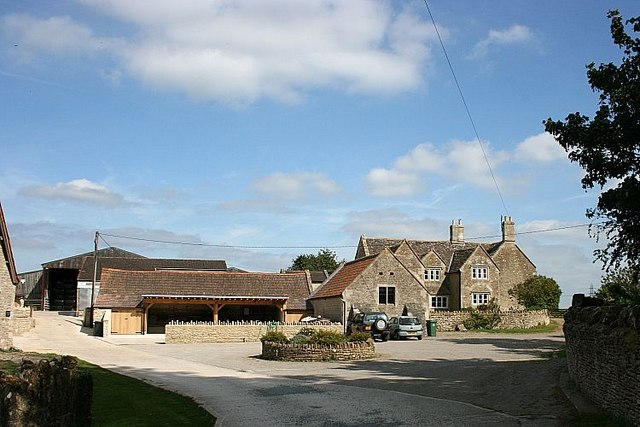
Church Farm

Stowford Manor, a late 15th-century farmhouse with a three-gable front, is Grade II* listed. Church Farmhouse, just north of the church, has 16th-century origins and was occupied continuously by the Baily family from the 17th century, according to the 1962 listed building record. The farmyard has a 17th-century cowshed. Midway Manor, a house in the north of the parish towards Bradford on Avon, was in the late 18th century the home of Henry Shrapnel, inventor of the Shrapnel shell.

Wingfield House, about half a mile north of the village beyond the crossroads on the Trowbridge – Farleigh Hungerford road, is a large building begun in the early 18th century. The original house has two storeys plus attic, and its five-bay west (garden) front has 12-pane windows and central semicircular niches. The property was bought in 1861 by Camille Caillard (1822–1898), a County Court judge. Substantial extensions in Tudor style by him and his descendants include a two-storey porch and a number of wings to the rear. The single-storey music room of 1899, to the north of the early house, is called a "good example of late C19" by Historic England and described as Arts and Crafts by Julian Orbach. Camille's son Vincent (1856–1930) was an army officer who was involved in diplomacy and international finance, and a director of companies including Vickers; around 1895 he bought most of the land in the parish.

Wingfield House was used as a hospital during the First World War, and in 1935 was donated to the Waifs and Strays Society by Bernard Caillard and his wife. It was requisitioned by the army during the Second World War, and soon after the end of the war was divided into four residences. In 2023, the original house was offered for sale at £1.3 million.

=== Parish church ===
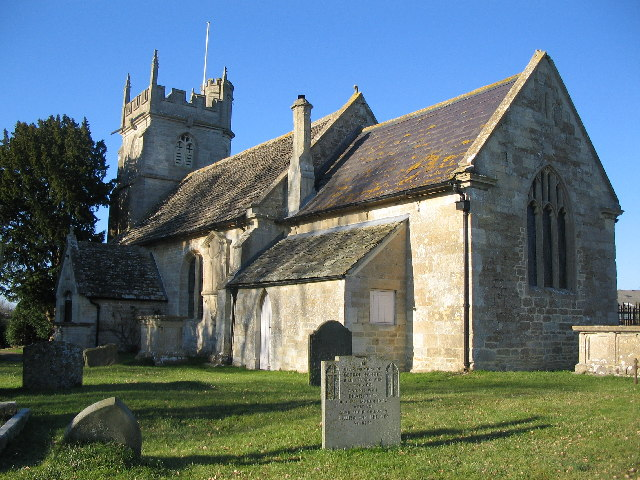
St Mary's church

The Church of England parish church of St Mary, on the eastern edge of the village, is mostly in dressed limestone; it has a 15th-century tower with a stair-turret, a nave rebuilt in the 17th and 18th centuries and a chancel rebuilt in 1861. The church was designated as Grade II* listed in 1962.

Parish registers from 1654 are held in the Wiltshire and Swindon History Centre, Chippenham. Today the church is part of the benefice of Bradford on Avon Holy Trinity, Westwood and Wingfield.

== Amenities ==
A National School was built in the village in 1852 and educated children of all ages until 1926. It became a Church of England school, and since 2009 has been a satellite of The Mead Community Primary School at Hilperton.

The village has a pub, the Poplars Inn.

== Local government ==
Wingfield is part of the Winsley and Westwood ward of Wiltshire Council, a unitary authority. This is represented by John Kidney (Conservative) who has held the position since May 2017. Wingfield has a parish council with five members.

== Notable people ==
Edward William Grinfield (1785–1864, biblical scholar) and Thomas De Quincey (1785–1859, writer) were educated at a private school at Wingfield, run by the rector.
