= Caillard =

Caillard is a surname of French origin. Notable people with the surname include:

- Camille Caillard (1822–1898), British barrister and judge
- Marc-Aurèle Caillard (born 1994), French footballer
- Philippe Caillard (1924–2026), French choral conductor
- Stéphane Caillard (born 1988), French actress and comedienne
- Sir Vincent Caillard (financier) (1856–1930), British army officer, financier and alderman
- Lieutenant Colonel Felix Digby Caillard MC, Bar (1894–1955), British Army Officer
- Air Vice Marshal Hugh Anthony Caillard, CB RAF (1927–2022), Royal Air Force officer and aviator
- Hugh Andrew Caillard MW (born 1959), Master of Wine and Australian wine expert
