= General Biddulph =

General Biddulph may refer to:

- Michael Biddulph (British Army officer) (1823–1904), British Army general
- Robert Biddulph (British Army officer) (1835–1918), British Army general
- Thomas Myddelton Biddulph (1809–1878), British Army general
