= Archibald Gordon =

Archibald Gordon may refer to:

- Archibald Gordon (British Army officer) (1812–1886), Scottish inspector-general of hospitals
- Ronald Gordon (bishop) (Archibald Ronald McDonald Gordon, 1927–2015), British Anglican bishop
- Archibald Gordon, 5th Marquess of Aberdeen and Temair (1913–1984), Scottish writer, broadcaster and peer
- Archibald Gordon (missionary) (1882–1967), who served in India through the Canadian Baptist Ministries
- Archibald Alexander Gordon (1867–1949), Scottish soldier
