= John Spring =

Sir John Spring may refer to:

- John Spring (MP for Northampton), in 1399 MP for Northampton
- Sir John Spring of Lavenham (died 1547), English merchant and politician
- Sir John Spring, 5th Baronet (1674–1740), English baronet
- Sir John Spring, 6th Baronet (died 1769), English baronet
- John Spring (cricketer) (1833–1907), New Zealand cricketer
- John Hopkins Spring (1862–1933), San Francisco real estate developer, see John Hopkins Spring Estate
