= Thomas Biddulph =

Thomas Biddulph may refer to:

- Thomas Myddelton Biddulph (1809–1878), British Army officer and courtier
- Thomas Tregenna Biddulph (1763–1838), English cleric
