= Vincent Caillard =

British intelligence officer, diplomat, financier, company director, industrialist

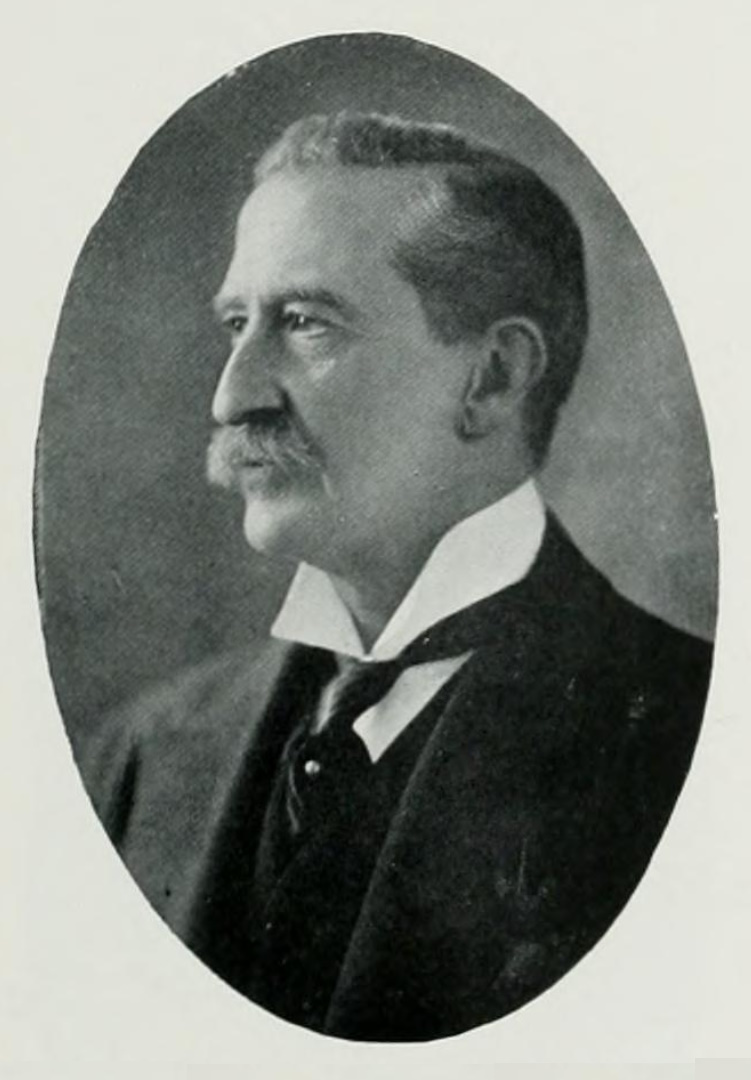
- Vincent Caillard (photographed in about 1922).
- Born: Vincent Henry Penalver Caillard; 23 October 1856; London, England
- Died: 18 March 1930 (aged 73); Paris, France
- Occupation(s): Intelligence officer, diplomat, financier, company director, industrialist

Sir Vincent Henry Penalver Caillard (23 October 1856 – 18 March 1930) was a British intelligence officer, diplomat, financier, industrialist and company director, principally for Vickers.

After being commissioned in the Royal Engineers, in the early 1880s Caillard was engaged in intelligence duties in the Levant region of the eastern Mediterranean. In 1883, he was appointed to a senior position on the Ottoman Public Debt Council in Constantinople, where he lived with his family. After returning to England in 1898 Caillard entered private business, taking up positions as a director in a diversity of companies engaged in areas such as in banking, agricultural development and railways.

In 1898, Caillard joined the board of directors of the armaments manufacturers, Vickers, where he remained for the next 29 years. In 1906 he was appointed financial director of Vickers, a position he held during the massive pre-war build-up of armaments in Europe and the Near East, and World War I that followed. Caillard developed a close relationship with the Greek arms-dealer Basil Zaharoff and acted as an intermediary between him and senior British politicians during the war. He was politically active in organisations advocating protectionism and opposing trade unionism. Caillard resigned from Vickers in August 1927 after a post-war period of losses and allegations of mis-management of the company, leading to a major write-down of capital in 1926.

== Biography ==
=== Early years ===
Vincent Henry Penalver Caillard was born on 23 October 1856 in London, the fifth child and eldest son of Camille Felix Désiré Caillard, a County Court judge, and his wife Emma Louisa (née Reynolds). From 1869, Vincent was educated at Eton College.

From 1872, Caillard was educated at the Royal Military Academy at Woolwich. He was commissioned in the Royal Engineers in 1876.

=== Government service ===
In April 1879, Caillard was appointed as an assistant to the British Commission for the delimitation of the Montenegrin frontier, formed in the wake of the Treaty of Berlin of July 1878 which enabled the recognition of the independent state of Montenegro in the Balkan region. In the following October he was appointed to the Arab Tabia Bridge Commission. In March 1880 he rejoined the Montenegrin Commission.

In July 1880, Caillard was sent "on special political duty" to the Epirus region of north-west Greece to report to the Berlin Congress. In September 1880 he was attached "on special service" to Admiral Sir Beauchamp Seymour during the naval demonstration at Dulcigno. Seymour commanded a combined fleet of the European great powers in the Adriatic Sea off Dulcigno and sent a formal demand to the commander of the occupying Ottoman troops, requiring the immediate surrender of the town to Montenegro.

Caillard married his step-sister Eliza Frances Hanham on 16 June 1881. Eliza was the youngest daughter of his father's second wife, Amy Hanham (née Copland), the widow of Captain John Hanham. Vincent and Eliza Caillard had two children, a son (Bernard, born in 1882) and a daughter (Emma, born in 1890).

In February 1882, Caillard was on service for the Intelligence Department. By August of that year he was attached to the headquarters staff during the British conquest of Egypt.

In 1883, in recognition of his linguistic facility and knowledge of the Ottoman empire, Caillard was appointed as the financial representative of Great Britain, Holland and Belgium on the Council of Administration of the Ottoman Public Debt, a European-controlled organization established to manage part of the Ottoman revenues in order to protect the interests of foreign creditors and ensure the repayment of loans. During his period on the Council he alternated with the French representative as president of the body. Caillard was responsible for reorganising the administration of revenues and the reform of indirect taxation. He also acted as an intermediary between the Sultan Abdul Hamid and the British government. Caillard and his family lived in Constantinople during his period on the Council from 1883 to 1898. In 1896, Caillard received a knighthood for his services. During his tenure on the Ottoman Public Debt Council, Caillard "earned a reputation as a business innovator and a political schemer, who ruthlessly advanced Britain's predatory commercial interests in the Levant". His experience of international politics and high finance proved to be of great value to his subsequent business career. He resigned from the Council in May 1898 after the death of his father in England.

=== Business interests ===
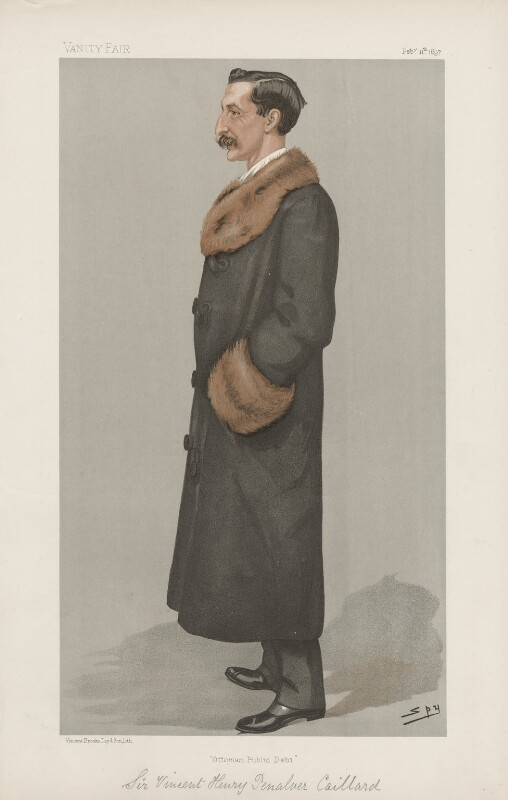
Portrait of Caillard in Vanity Fair by 'Spy' (1897)

Caillard's father died on 1 May 1898 at Weymouth in Dorset. After his father's death, Caillard inherited Wingfield House, near Trowbridge in Wiltshire. He made subsequent purchases which resulted in his owning much of the land in Wingfield parish. Caillard had a music room built at Wingfield House, into which he installed an organ. Throughout his life he was an amateur composer of music, writing songs and a musical setting of William Blake's 'Songs of Innocence'.

From 1898 Caillard entered private business. On the recommendation of the banker Sir Ernest Cassel, he was appointed a director of the newly formed National Bank of Egypt. He took an active part in its early development and remained on the board until 1908. He became chairman of companies involved in agricultural development in the Ottoman empire (the Daira Sanieh Co. and the Irrigation Investment Co.) and was briefly a director of the Brussels-based La Banque Internationale de Commerce et de l'Industrie. Caillard also held director positions in a number of other undertakings. His railway interests included directorships in Mexican Central Railways Securities (1900–1908), Bath Electric Tramways (1904–1910) and the London, Chatham & Dover Railway (1905–1922). He was also a director (1903–1923) and chairman (1904–1920) of Beyer, Peacock & Company, a locomotive and general engineering firm.

In 1898, Caillard also joined the board of directors of Vickers, the British armaments and engineering company. He remained with Vickers for the next twenty-nine years. His appointment to the board came during a period of expansion of the company; Sigismund Loewe was the finance director who had presided over the company's rapid growth. Loewe died in 1903 and his financial responsibilities were gradually assumed by Caillard, who was appointed finance director in 1906, after which Vickers became Caillard's principal business interest. His responsibilities in that capacity included the oversight of much of the company's foreign operations.

Caillard was an energetic supporter of Joseph Chamberlain's campaign to protect British companies by imposing tariffs on imports, and in 1904 was the chairman of Chamberlain's Tariff Commission. Caillard introduced the Greek arms-dealer and industrialist Basil Zaharoff to Chamberlain and "the two men soon found an identity of interests". Zaharoff had begun a close business association with the Vickers company in the late 1890s. Caillard, Zaharoff and Chamberlain frequently met to discuss business and financial deals and Zaharoff used these meetings as his introduction to British politics.

In 1907 Caillard was elected as a county alderman on the London County Council for the Municipal Reform Party (a local party allied to the parliamentary Conservative Party). Although county aldermen were elected for six year terms, Caillard resigned in November 1907 after serving for only eight months.

Caillard used his connections in international business circles to arrange finance for Vickers' customers during the pre-war build-up of armaments in Europe and the Near East. Although Zaharoff and Francis Barker were the principal salesmen for Vickers, Caillard was also involved in direct business negotiations using his contacts in the Ottoman empire. Early in 1914 Caillard negotiated for Vickers and Armstrong Whitworth to carry out the reconstruction of the Turkish fleet, dockyards and arsenals. Work had commenced on the contract when war broke out in July 1914.

After 1914 Caillard was increasingly occupied with political activity, in opposition to labour militancy and promoting a post-war protectionist reconstruction of the British commercial sector. In 1916 he and the industrialist Dudley Docker founded the Federation of British Industries, an employers' association. In December 1916 Caillard joined with two other Vickers directors, Sir Trevor Dawson and Francis Barker, to establish the London Imperialists, later renamed the British Commonwealth Union, a political pressure group advocating protectionism and opposing trade unionism. Caillard led "an outspoken and disgruntled protectionist faction" within the Federation of British Industries and served as the body's third president in 1919.

During the war Caillard maintained a steady correspondence on the subject of labour subversion with David Lloyd George, the Minister of Munitions and, from December 1916, Prime Minister. He acted as an intermediary between Basil Zaharoff and successive British prime ministers Herbert Asquith and Lloyd George, when the Greek arms-dealer was entrusted with clandestine negotiations in various attempts to bribe Turkish politicians to take the Ottoman empire out of the war.

During World War I Caillard's wife Eliza (known as 'Lily') utilised "a large portion" of Wingfield House as a Red Cross Hospital for wounded soldiers, beginning with a first influx of wounded Belgian soldiers in 1914. She was the commandant of the hospital, assisted by her daughter Esmah. In January 1918 Lady Eliza Caillard was awarded the Order of the British Empire for her "hospital work".

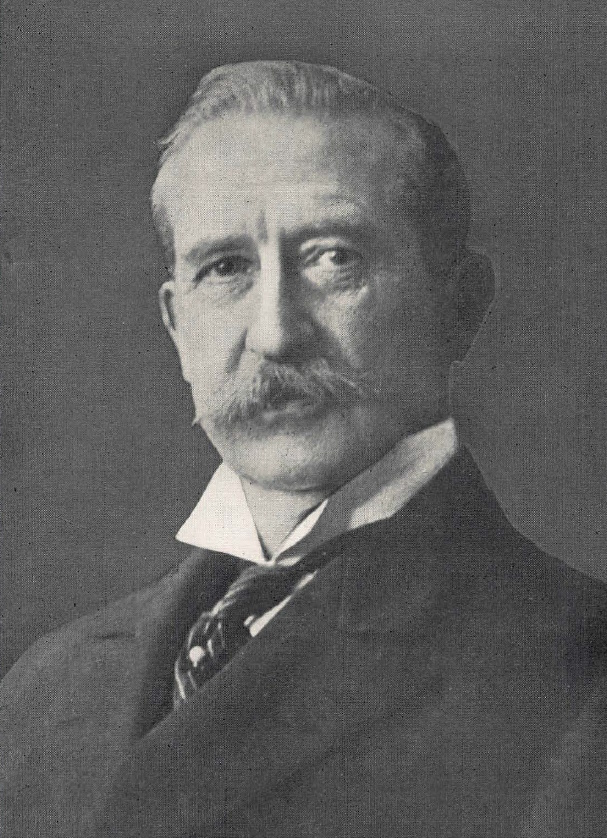
Sir Vincent Caillard.

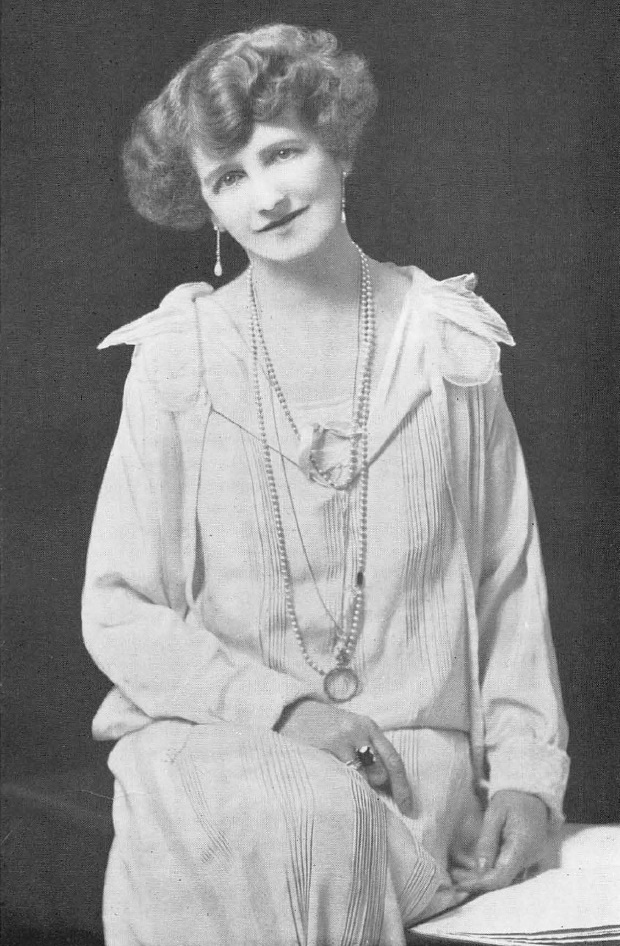
Lady Zoë Caillard.

In 1920 Caillard was commissioned as a Deputy Lieutenant of Wiltshire.

Eliza 'Lily' Caillard died on 15 March 1926 "after a short illness".

On 22 March 1927 Caillard married Zoë Gertrude Maund (née Dudgeon) at Knightsbridge in central London. The bride was the widow of the banker and mountaineer John Oakley Maund who had died in 1902. The couple travelled to Monte Carlo for their honeymoon.

World War I had thoroughly disrupted the pre-war political and financial world in which the Vickers company had been operating. The output of munitions under wartime conditions produced profits for Vickers of over £4 million pounds in the period 1916 to 1919, but questions began to emerge about the company's internal accounting. In March 1919 Vickers purchased British Westinghouse, the electrical interests of the Metropolitan Carriage, Wagon & Finance Co., for £19 million pounds (considered by observers to be an inflated valuation). The buy-out was conducted through Dudley Docker, the chairman of the Metropolitan company and a close political associate of Caillard. Subsequent mismanagement and the loose financial control of company subsidiaries, as well as unprofitable expansions into Romania and Poland, led to losses and a weakened financial position. In 1926 a major write-down of capital was forced upon the Vickers board. In August 1927 Caillard resigned from the company.

=== Death ===
Vincent Caillard died at the American Hospital in Paris on 18 March 1930, aged 73. He had travelled to Paris for an operation, which was successful, but he later contracted pneumonia which resulted in his death. His funeral was held on 26 March at the Wingfield church, and a memorial service took place later the same day at St Margaret's, Westminster.

== Sir Vincent Caillard's 'afterlife' ==
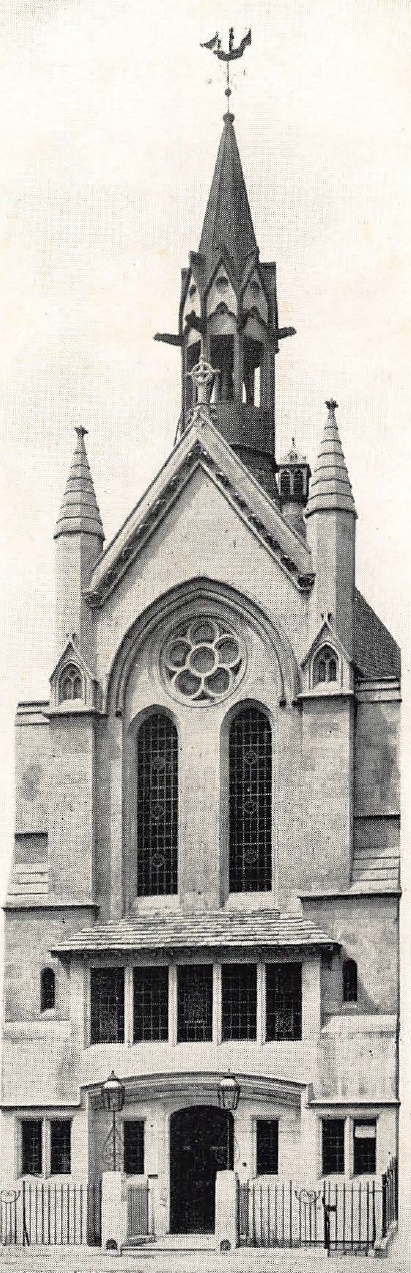
'The Belfry'

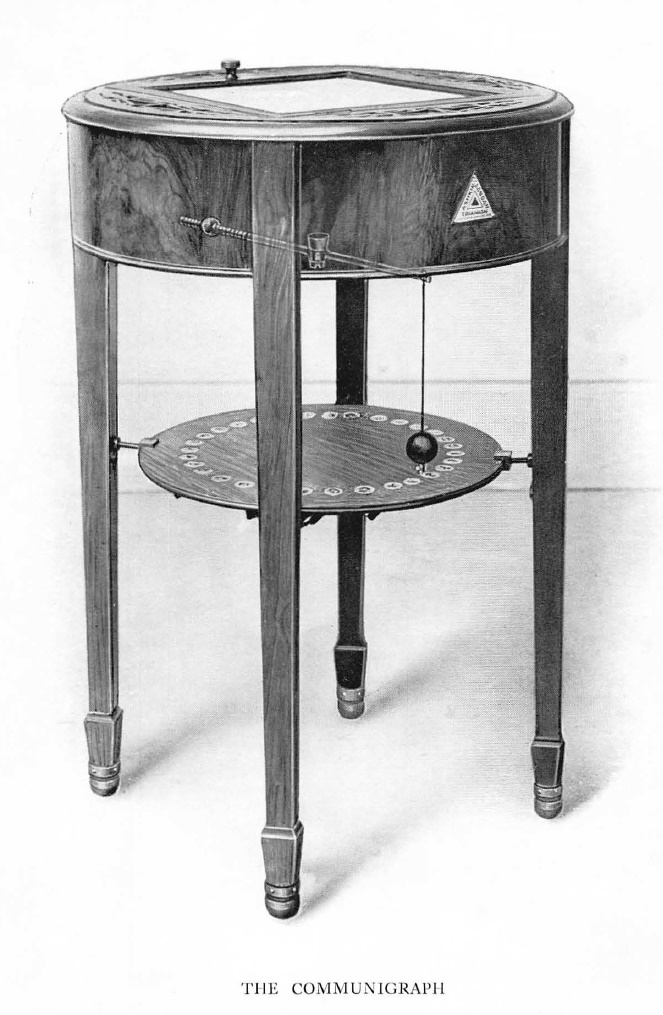
The Communigraph

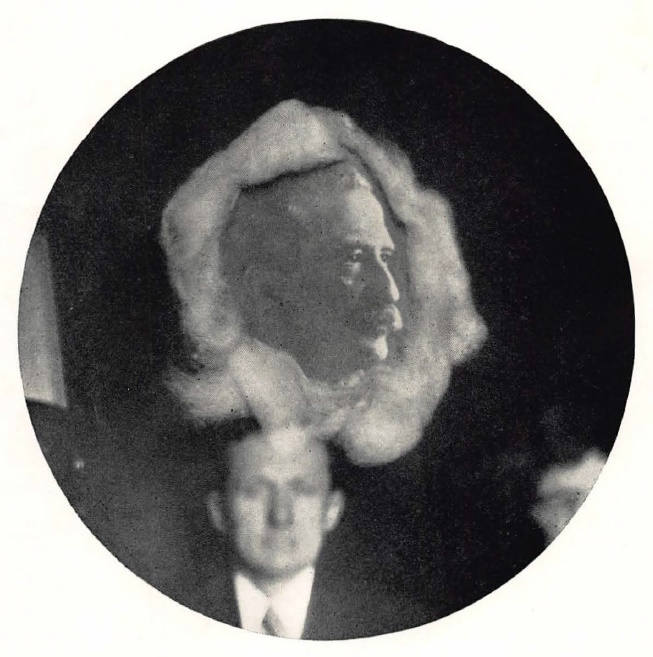
"Psychic photograph of Sir Vincent Caillard"

Images published in A New Conception of Love (1934)

After Sir Vincent Caillard's death his widow, Lady Zoë Caillard, became interested in spiritualism and, with a group of like-minded individuals, she founded the Society of Progressive Souls. The Society held their meetings in the upper storey of Zoë Caillard's private residence, called 'The Belfry', in West Halkin Street in the Belgravia district of London. She had purchased the former Presbyterian church in 1924 and had it converted to a private residence. Members of the Society held séances at 'The Belfry', at which it was claimed that the spirit of the late Vincent Caillard made contact. Lady Caillard claimed that her late husband had materialised physically at one of the sessions. As she later recounted: "He took my hand in his two hands and pressed it to his lips [as] two hot tears fell on my hand".

In 1932 Zoë Caillard published a booklet titled Sir Vincent Caillard Speaks from the Spirit World, in which she discussed her spiritualist beliefs and described her late husband's actions and purported words from beyond the grave.

In August 1934 a book titled A New Conception of Love, written by "Sir Vincent Caillard" was published; under the author's name on the title page was added: "Written on his Communigraph". It was claimed that Caillard's spirit had communicated to Lady Caillard and other séance attendees via a communigraph and over a period of two years his widow had transcribed his words (as published in A New Conception of Love). A communigraph was a device for communicating with spirits of the dead, akin to a mechanical ouija board. It was a drum-shaped table with a pendulum on a revolving arm which swings freely and makes contact with small metal plates representing letters of the alphabet. The contact with a metal plate closed a circuit to make the corresponding letter appear illuminated on the face of the table.

Lady Caillard announced that she would hand over her town-house 'The Belfry' to the Society of Progressive Souls "for conducting spiritualistic activities". The widow's adult children from her first marriage were displeased with this situation and, amidst expressions of doubt and accusations of fraud, Lady Caillard banned her children and other family members from visiting her. Even the visiting American psychic Arthur Ford, who attended séances at 'The Belfry', expressed the opinion that messages from the communigraph had an earthly origin.

Lady Zoë Caillard died on 16 January 1935, aged 66. Her estate was valued at £17,000 and, as promised, 'The Belfry' was bequeathed to the Society of Progressive Souls. Her son, Guy Maund, had previously announced he would contest the will, but changed his mind when the contents of the document were revealed.

== Publications ==
- Sir Vincent H. P. Caillard (1903), Imperial Fiscal Reform, London: Edward Arnold; an expansion of articles published in the National Review from February to April 1903.
