= Camille Caillard =

British barrister and County Court judge

Camille Felix Désiré Caillard (12 September 1822 – 1 May 1898) was a British barrister and County Court judge from 1859 until 1897.

== Biography ==
The only son of Camille Timothée Caillard, a French cavalry officer, Caillard was educated privately before being called to the bar at the Inner Temple in 1845. He was appointed to the county court bench in 1859 by Lord Chelmsford, which provoked accusations of favouritism as Caillard was "a man nobody knew". Succeeding Joseph Grace Smith, he sat for Circuit No. 52, which included Bath and Swindon. On his retirement in 1897, he was the longest serving county court judge.

Caillard was a JP for Wiltshire and Somerset, and from May 1878 a Deputy Lieutenant of Wiltshire.

== Personal life ==
Caillard married Emma Louisa (1827–1865), daughter of Vincent Stuckey Reynolds of Taunton, in 1850. She was a first cousin of Benjamin Disraeli. By her he had at least four sons and five daughters. In 1861 he bought Wingfield Manor, a large house from the early 18th century, at Wingfield in west Wiltshire, within reach of Bath; the house had earlier been owned by his predecessor, Joseph Smith.

In 1872, he remarried to Amy Ursula, widow of Captain John Hanham and younger daughter of Alexander Copland: they had one son.

The eldest son from his first marriage was the financier Sir Vincent Caillard (1856–1930), who from c.1895 owned much of the land in Wingfield parish.
