= Peartree Green =

Open space in Southampton, England

Coordinates: 50°54′14″N 1°22′37″W

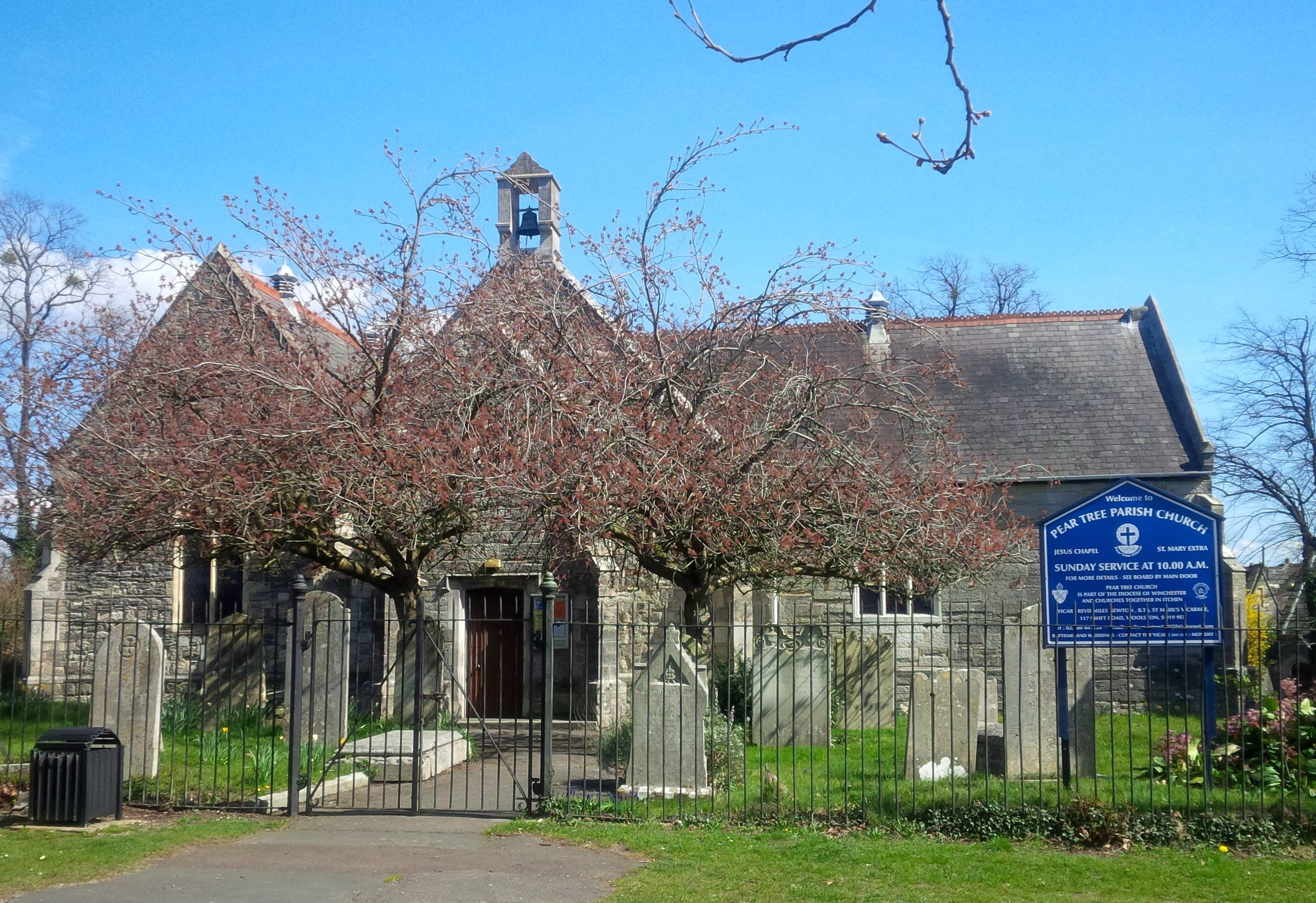
- The parish church on Peartree Green

- Location within Southampton
- Unitary authority: Southampton
- Ceremonial county: Hampshire
- Region: South East
- Country: England
- Sovereign state: United Kingdom
- Post town: SOUTHAMPTON
- Postcode district: SO19
- Dialling code: 023
- Police: Hampshire and Isle of Wight
- Fire: Hampshire and Isle of Wight
- Ambulance: South Central
- UK Parliament: Southampton Itchen

Peartree Green is an open space on high ground on the east bank of the River Itchen in Southampton, in the ceremonial county of Hampshire, England. A 16th/17th century building, Peartree House, still stands, though is today concealed by private housing. The house and the green take their name from a pear tree that grew near the parish church. Some of the original open space has been built on, but a large proportion remains as a recreational area. It contains a church and two former schools. It overlooks the River Itchen to St Mary's Church in Southampton.

== Geography ==
Peartree Green adjoins the districts of Woolston, Bitterne, Sholing and Merryoak within the city of Southampton. It overlooks the River Itchen to St Mary's Church in Southampton.

== History ==
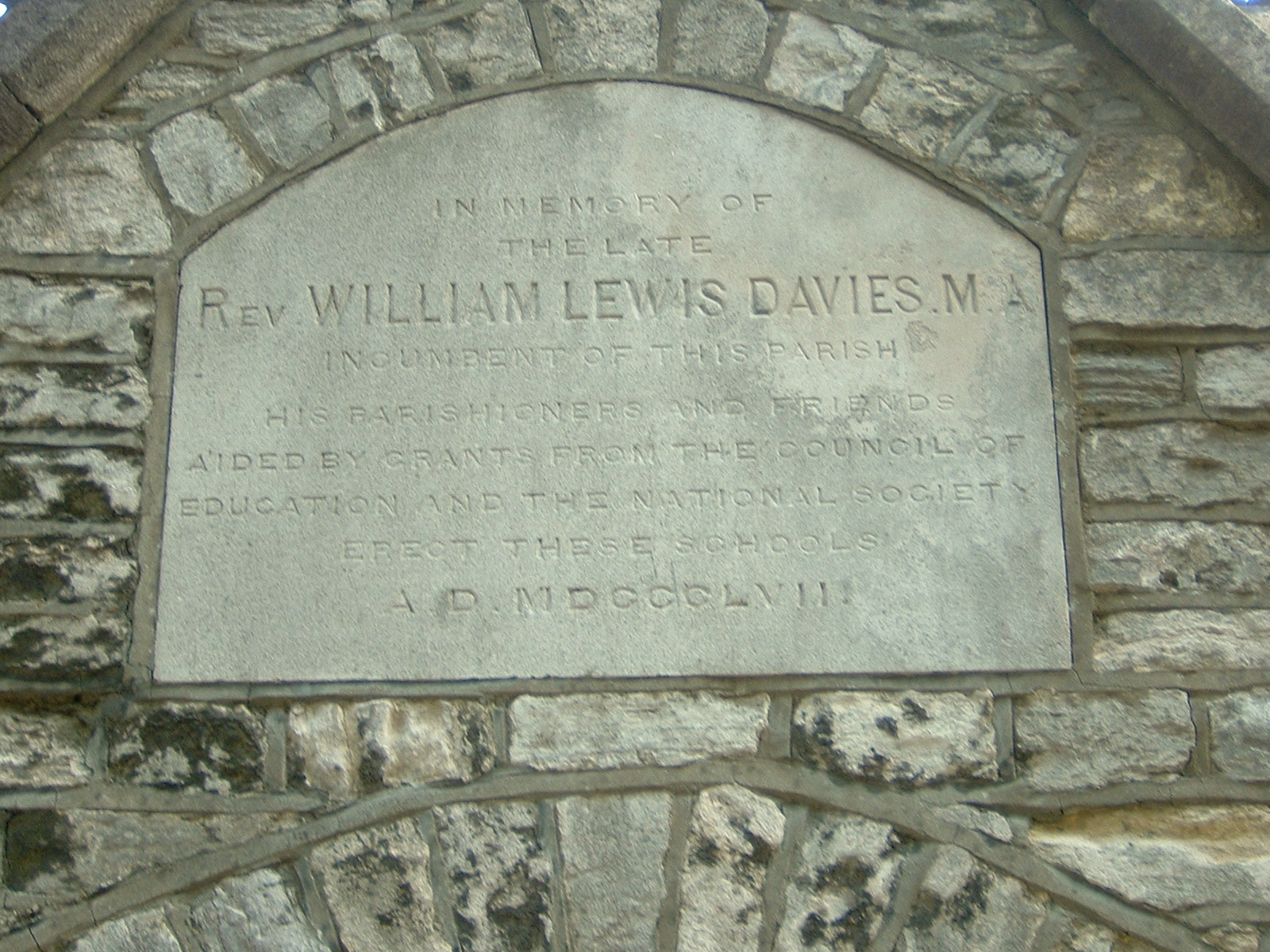
Memorial stone at Peartree school

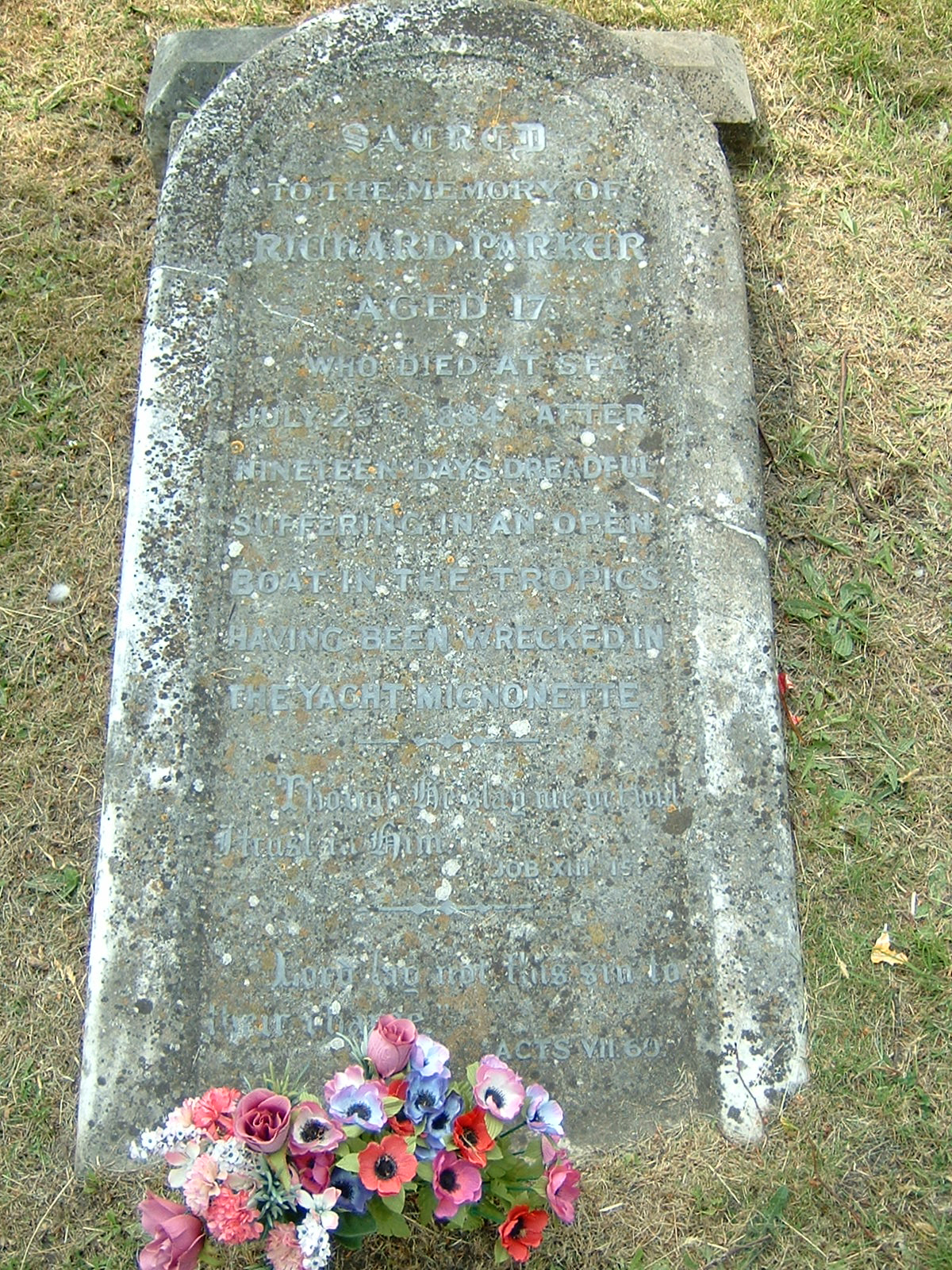
Memorial stone to Richard Parker in Peartree Green.

Francis Mylles, M.P. for Winchester from 1588 to 1593, built Peartree House in the late 16th century, using stone from Bitterne Manor which had previously been used by the Romans at their settlement at Clausentum. Captain Richard Smith, former governor of Calshot Castle, lived at Peartree House from around 1617.

A small church, now Peartree Parish Church, was built as Jesus Chapel by Smith in 1618. It was dedicated in 1620. Although it was not part of Southampton at that time, Jesus Chapel served the parish of St Mary's Extra, which was used as an overflow for the parish of St Mary's in Southampton. Construction of Jesus Chapel saved parishioners from a rough crossing over the Itchen to Southampton or a long journey to the neighbouring churches at Hound, Botley or South Stoneham. The church website makes a claim to being the world's oldest Anglican church, stating that it was the first one to be built and consecrated after the English Reformation. However, several churches were built quite soon after the Reformation, such as St George's Church, Esher, built in 1540, and Old St Leonard's Church, Langho, which was built in 1557; however, when consecrated in September 1620, the service, conducted by the Bishop of Winchester, formed the basis for future Church of England consecrations, so the church can lay claim to be the first to use the revised Church of England consecration service.

Peartree House was built by 1617, then altered in the late 18th century. It was once home to General Shrapnel, inventor of the Shrapnel shell.

A National school was built next to Jesus Chapel in 1857. Subsequently, an infant's school was built in 1897 in memory of Rev. W. Lewis.

By the late 19th century, the area contained many impressive houses and villas which were home to Southampton's wealthy traders.

Itchen Ferry village no longer exists, but it used to adjoin Peartree Green. The graveyard at Jesus Chapel contains a memorial to Richard Parker of the village, who died at sea following the wreck of the yacht Mignonette off South Africa in 1884. Cast adrift without provisions, his companions killed and ate him in order to survive. It is one of the few recorded cases of human cannibalism in modern times. The subsequent murder trial R v Dudley and Stephens changed English law by establishing the precedent that necessity is no defence to the charge of murder.

Peartree Green was incorporated into the borough of Southampton in 1920. The area has subsequently experienced significant suburban development. The schools became an annex to Woolston School; they have since been converted into residential homes.

Between 1954 and 1971 Woolston Tip operated as a landfill site between the southern end of Sea Road and the railway.

In 2018 the green was designated a local nature reserve. In July the same year, two hectares of it were damaged by fire after becoming dry due to the heat wave.
