= Joseph Trewavas =

Recipient of the Victoria Cross

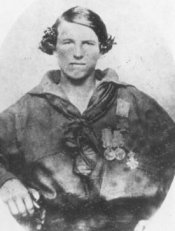
- Born: 14 December 1835; Mousehole, England
- Died: 20 July 1905 (aged 69); Mousehole, England
- Burial place: Old School Cemetery, Paul
- Military career
- Allegiance: United Kingdom
- Branch: Royal Navy
- Rank: Able Seaman
- Conflicts: Crimean War
- Awards: Victoria Cross; Conspicuous Gallantry Medal; Légion d'honneur (France)
- Other work: Cornwall County Councillor

Joseph Trewavas VC, CGM (14 December 1835 – 20 July 1905) was a Royal Navy sailor and a recipient of the Victoria Cross, the highest award for gallantry in the face of the enemy that can be awarded to British and Commonwealth forces.

== Details ==
Trewavas was 19 years old, and a seaman in the Royal Navy during the Crimean War when the following deed took place for which he was awarded the VC.

On 3 July 1855 in the Strait of Genitchi, Sea of Azov in the Crimea, Seaman Trewavas of HMS Beagle was sent in a four-oared gig to destroy a bridge, and so cut the Russians' main supply route. This was the third attempt, the first two having failed. As the gig ground against the bridge, Seaman Trewavas leapt out with an axe and began to hew away at the hawsers holding the pontoons together, and although the enemy kept up a heavy fire, particularly on Trewavas himself, he continued until his task was completed, and the two severed ends of the pontoon began to drift apart. He was wounded as he got back into the gig.

== Further information ==
He later achieved the rank of able seaman. He was a member of Cornwall County Council and a member of the County Fisheries Committee.

== The medal ==
The medal is housed in the Penlee House Gallery & Museum in Penzance. It is generally not on display, but can be seen on appointment.

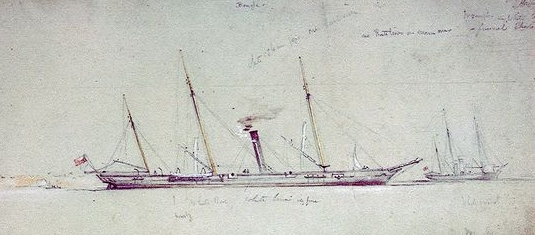
HMS Beagle (left) with HMS Wrangler by Sir Oswald Brierly, 1855

== See also ==
- List of British recipients of the Légion d'Honneur for the Crimean War
- List of Crimean War Victoria Cross recipients
