= Tariff Commission =

The Tariff Commission was a 1903 initiative in the United Kingdom to examine and promote proposals for tariff reform, which would protect British companies, and those of the British Empire, by imposing tariffs on foreign imports.

The Commission was established in December 1903 by Joseph Chamberlain, a Liberal Unionist Member of Parliament who had recently resigned as Secretary of State for the Colonies. The unofficial body was set up under the auspices of the Tariff Reform League. William Hewins, the economist and first director of the London School of Economics from 1895 to 1903, was Secretary and Sir Robert Herbert, the first Premier of Queensland, Australia, was Chairman. The Commission consisted of 59 businessmen whose brief was to construct a "Scientific Tariff" which would achieve tariff reform objectives.

The aims of the Commission were to examine and report on Chamberlain's proposals for tariff reform, and to work out what import duties should be recommended.

Members of the Commission included:

- Sir Vincent Caillard, international financier and company director
- Henry Birchenough, silk manufacturer and special commissioner appointed by the Board of Trade in 1903 to inquire into and report upon the present position and future prospects of British trade in South Africa
- Henry Chaplin, 1st Viscount Chaplin, Conservative politician
- Sir Andrew Noble, 1st Baronet, physicist
- Sir Charles Tennant, President of United Alkali, businessman
- Sir Alexander Henderson, 1st Baron Faringdon, financier and Liberal Unionist Member of Parliament
- Sir Samuel Bagster Boulton, chairman of Burt, Boulton, and Haywood (Limited), of London, Paris, Riga, Salzaette, and Bilbao, timber merchants and contractors. He was also chairman of the Dominion Tar and Chemical Company (Limited), and of the British Australian Timber Company (Limited).
- Alfred Gilbey, younger brother of Walter Gilbey, wine and spirits dealer
- Vicary Gibbs, Conservative MP for St Albans

The Commission gathered data from businesses through interviews and questionnaires. They intended to publish reports on every industry that they investigated, and bring these together into a final report that would lay out a full tariff scheme. Meetings continued until at least 1917. Seven volumes were published, but lack of funds caused the eventual abandonment of publishing.

== See also ==
- United States International Trade Commission called the U.S. Tariff Commission, 1916-1974
