= Midway Manor =

Country house in Wiltshire, England

Coordinates: 51.3260°N 2.2607°W

Midway Manor is a country house and farm in Wingfield parish, about 1 1/2 miles (2.4 km) south of Bradford on Avon in Wiltshire, England.

The house is approximately midway between Bradford on Avon and Wingfield, on the B3109 road. It was originally an Elizabethan Manor Farm flanked by two large stone barns. In about 1723, the Midway estate was the property of the Shrapnel family who were prosperous cloth merchants from Bradford on Avon. Lieutenant-General Henry Shrapnel (1761–1842), inventor of the Shrapnel shell, was born at Midway Manor which remained with the Shrapnel family until 1871.

The house had stone cannonballs mounted in various places on the front façade, and a carving of the Shrapnel shell exploding with the Latin inscription Ratio Ultima Regum ("the Last Argument of Kings"), a phrase Louis XIV of France had cast on the cannons of his armies. This carving is now immediately outside the Manor's entrance gates. On the back of the gate piers, the names of some of the battles that were won with the aid of the Shrapnel shell are engraved. These include the battles of Waterloo, Talavera, the Kyber Pass, Salamanca, San Sebastian, Bidassoa, Bella Formosa, Tsage, Abyssinia, Monte Video, Maida, Ghuzznee (Ghazni), Bussaco, Table Bay, Kioze as well as the Crimean and Burmese wars. On top of each gate pier are four of the original spherical case shots. The late-19th century gate piers are Grade II listed since 1988.

In 1892, the manor became the property of Henry Baynton who removed the front façade, necessitating an almost complete rebuilding of the house with stone provided from the barns which were then demolished.
