= Peartree House =

Building in Southampton, Hampshire, England

- Location within Southampton

General information
- Location: Peartree Green, Southampton, England, Peartree Avenue, Bitterne
- Coordinates: 50.9053°N 1.3732°W
- Construction started: 1590–1600
- Owner: Pear Tree House Rehabilitation Limited

Design and construction
- Architect: Francis Mylles

Peartree House is a Grade II listed building in the Peartree Green area of Southampton, England. The oldest part of the property was built for Francis Mylles, M.P. for Winchester, using stone from the Roman settlement at Clausentum. The most notable former resident of the property was Lieutenant-General Henry Shrapnel who invented the weapon named after him.

== History ==
Peartree House was built during the reign of Queen Elizabeth I, at the end of the 16th century (probably between 1590 and 1600). Its builder and owner was Francis Mylles, M.P. for Winchester from 1588 to 1593; he was also the tenant of Bitterne Manor, owned by the Bishop of Winchester, from whom Mylles obtained consent to use stone from the Roman fort and settlement at Clausentum, close to which Bitterne Manor stands.

Frances Mylles' daughter was married to Captain Richard Smith, who lived in Peartree House in 1617, and who was responsible for the building of nearby Jesus Chapel. Peartree House was occupied by the Mylles family for almost three centuries; the last of the family died in 1780, and it was then passed to members of the Speed and Waring families, who were related to the Mylles. During the early 19th century, the property was extended and the castellated facade was added.

Notable occupiers were Lieutenant-General Henry Shrapnel – inventor of the shell of that name – who died there in 1842; and the Cruickshank family – active in local education matters – who owned the property from 1893 to 1917.

In the 1930s, the land around the house was sold off for development. Southampton Corporation bought the house in 1949, for use as a home for the elderly, adding numerous extensions to the rear. The property is now owned by Peartree House Rehabilitation & Community Service where it is used as a specialist rehabilitation centre for clients with acquired brain injuries.

=== Other known occupiers ===
- George Waring: prior to 1828
- Mrs. Webber: 1828–c.1835
- Henry Shrapnel: c.1835–1842
- Rear Admiral Sir John Wentworth Loring: 1842–1853
- R. Hesketh: 1854–1863
- George Errington: 1866–1875
- James Appleford: pre-1886–1888
- Hugh Stanley Morris: 1888–1893
- John Cruickshank: 1893–1917
- Llewellyn Llewellin: 1917–1918 (used as a school)
- John Jackson: 1918–c.1932
- H. Pierce: 1948–1949 (used as a hotel)

== Description ==
The main house is a Grade II listed building, having been first listed in September 1954.

The house is a long two-storeyed building with a stucco front and a tiled roof behind a castellated parapet. The main (south-eastern) facade has three sash windows on the first floor in the central section and two in each of the wings. The central part is set back, with a ground floor verandah between the projecting wings; the verandah has five wooden archways with Neo-Tudor heads. The wings have iron balconettes to the first floor windows.

Inside the building there are inglenook fireplaces, most of which are now blocked. There are ancient oak beams in the old kitchen and on the top floor.
