= Skirmish at the Genitchi Strait =

1855 action of the Crimean War

The Skirmish at the Genitchi Strait was a minor action in the Crimean War, which occurred on 3 July 1855. It is notable in that it was the occasion on which a Victoria Cross was awarded, to seaman Joseph Trewavas.

== The action ==
The Russians had built a large floating pontoon bridge across the Genitchi Strait, Sea of Azov, to connect the town of Genitchi to the Arabat Spit, and it served as the main supply route to reinforce their troops at Sevastopol. The destruction of the bridge would force the Russians to travel an extra 192 kilometres (119 mi) to deliver supplies, and it therefore became a strategic objective for British forces. Two attacks to cut the floating bridge's hawsers had proved unsuccessful and alerted the Russian garrison. The British made a third attempt on 3 July 1855 using HMS Beagle's four-oared gig, commanded by Gunner John Hayles, and a small paddle-box steamer with one gun, under Midshipman Martin Tracy. The paddle-box steamer moored where the crew could see Russian soldiers marching about on shore and fired the first round in the breech, which drew the gun's securing bolts and made it useless. That left six men in a four-oared boat (including Joseph Trewavas), one rifle, ten rounds of ammunition, and a cutlass apiece to face two hundred enemy on shore behind heaps of coal.

In Trewavas's own words:

As we paddled out of sight of our ship, on a little mound we could see the Russians motioning the soldiers on shore to keep down and our man in the bow with a loaded rifle wanted to have a 'go' at them but the gunner gave him orders not to do so. I was pulling the bow oar and when we were near the floating bridge, I leapt onto it, cut the hawsers and jumped back in the boat again and shoved off. During this time the Russians, who were only 80 metres off, had not fired a shot, and our man in the bow fired his rifle at them swearing he hit his man. The Russians then let fly. For some time we could not get away as the water was so shallow, and the shot came at us like hailstones, wounding three men and riddling the boat with shot. Reaching safety and the protection of our ship, our boat was sinking and full of water.

(Trewavas wondered why the Russians had not fired upon the British as they approached the pontoon bridge at Genitchi, but later a Russian officer explained that they had no idea the sailors planned to destroy the bridge, believing rather that they intended to destroy shipping, and therefore held fire with the intention of taking them prisoner.)
