= Alfred Templeman =

British general

- Born: 1833; Uplyme, Devonshire
- Died: 7 December 1914 (aged 80–81); Hazelwood, Budleigh Salterton, Devonshire
- Military career
- Allegiance: United Kingdom
- Branch: British Army
- Service years: 1852 - 1887
- Rank: Major General
- Unit: 21st Regiment of Foot
- Conflicts: Crimean War; Siege of Sevastopol; Battle of the Alma; Battle of Inkerman; Battle of the Great Redan; Battle of Kinburn (1855); Battle of Balaclava
- Awards: Legion of Honour, 5th Class

Major-General Alfred Templeman (1833 – 7 December 1914) was a career officer in the British Army, serving for 35 years and taking part in many of the major actions of the Crimean War. He was educated at King's School, Bruton, and in 1874 he became a member of the United Service Club. He was also involved in horse racing, stewarding at least one race in Rangoon in 1869.

== Military service ==
Templeman purchased his commission of 2nd lieutenant in the 21st Regiment of Foot on 26 March 1852, and later the rank of lieutenant on 4 March 1853.

=== Crimean War ===
Templeman was present on the front lines of the Battle of Inkerman with the 21st as part of the Fourth Division and sustained minor injuries to the hand, being listed by Alexander Kinglake and acknowledged in the London Gazette. He went on to fight at Sevastopol and Balaclava, went on the expedition to Kinburn and was part of the attack on the Redan.

On 2 February 1855 he was promoted without purchase to the rank of captain.

For his service in Crimea he was awarded the Legion of Honour 5th Class by the Emperor of France on 2 August 1856, amongst other members of the British armed forces. He was also awarded the Crimea Medal with clasps for Alma, Balaklava, Inkermann and Sebastopol. He was in possession of a tailor's copy of a Turkish Crimea Medal of Sardinian issue - as many British-issue medals were lost in transit, it is to be assumed that he procured his own copy.

=== Further career ===
On the 5th of November 1857, Templeman was made Instructor of Musketry for his regiment.

He was attached to the Second Battalion, and from 1859 was posted in multiple locations including Newport, Shorncliffe, Dublin, Carragh and Bellary, where he survived a cholera epidemic. He purchased the rank of major in February 1868, and in the same year his battalion marched from Secunderabad to Madras, embarking for Burma in October. He was made Brevet Lieutenant-Colonel on 15 March 1877, and then full Lieutenant-Colonel on 23 January 1878, taking command of the First Battalion. In 1878 he presented written testimony in the court martial of Lieutenant Lambart of his regiment. He was further promoted to colonel on 1 July 1881. Two years later, on 23 January 1883, he was placed on to half pay.

On 6 December 1887 it is recorded that he stepped down from the command of the 91st Regimental District at Stirling Castle (Princess Louise's Argyll and Sutherland Highlanders), whilst holding the rank of Honorary Major-General, and retired from the military.

== Legacy ==
A remembrance plaque to Templeman is at Auld Kirk of Ayr, Scotland.
