= John Spring (cricketer) =

Irish cricketer

Personal information
- Full name: John Patrick Spring
- Born: 1844 or 1845; Arran Quay, Dublin, Ireland
- Died: 13 February 1907 (aged 62); Rathdown, County Dublin, Ireland
- Batting: Right-handed
- Role: Wicket-keeper

Domestic team information
- Years: Team
- 1877/78–1884/85: Otago
- FC debut: 21 February 1878 Otago v Canterbury
- Last FC: 30 December 1884 Otago v Auckland

Career statistics
Competition	First-class
Matches	8
Runs scored	127
Batting average	9.07
100s/50s	0/0
Top score	18
Catches/stumpings	1/1
- Source: ESPNcricinfo, 11 June 2023

John Patrick Spring (1844/45 – 13 February 1907) was an Irish cricketer and soldier in the British Army. While living in New Zealand, he played eight first-class matches for Otago between the 1877–78 and 1884–85 seasons.

== Life and career ==
Born in Dublin where he was christened in August 1845, Spring served in the British Army's 5th (Northumberland Fusiliers) Regiment of Foot. He was commissioned as an ensign in the 2nd battalion in October 1864 and joined the regiment in Cape Colony where he is known to have played some cricket. The battalion returned to Britain in 1867, and Spring, who became the battalion's Instructor of Musketry in November, was stationed at Dover and then Aldershot where he was promoted to the rank of lieutenant in January 1868. Later in the year he played cricket for the Officers of the Aldershot Division side against I Zingari, a fixture which he also featured in in 1869. He played more cricket in Scotland in 1870 and 1871 whilst the battalion was stationed at Glasgow, before the battalion moved to Dublin in 1872 where Spring appears to have left the army after being declared bankrupt.

Spring and his wife Lucy left for New Zealand in 1876, arriving in Dunedin in January 1877. He worked in Dunedin as an accountant and insurance agent, had interests in a New Zealand mining company, and was secretary of the Dunedin, Peninsula and Ocean Beach Railway Company.

A wicket-keeper and lower-order batsman, Spring played in most of Otago's matches between the 1876–77 and 1884–85 seasons. He captained the team in several matches, including the one against the touring Australians in January 1878, when the close match finished in a draw. After the English tour of New Zealand in 1876–77, the English veteran player James Southerton judged Spring to be the best wicket-keeper in New Zealand.

Spring umpired five first-class matches between 1883 and 1890 and was elected president of the Otago Cricket Association in 1890.

Spring and his wife returned to the United Kingdom in 1895. He died at Rathdown, County Dublin, in February 1907, aged in his early sixties.
