= Henry Shrapnel =

British Army officer (1761–1842)

Lieutenant-General Henry Shrapnel
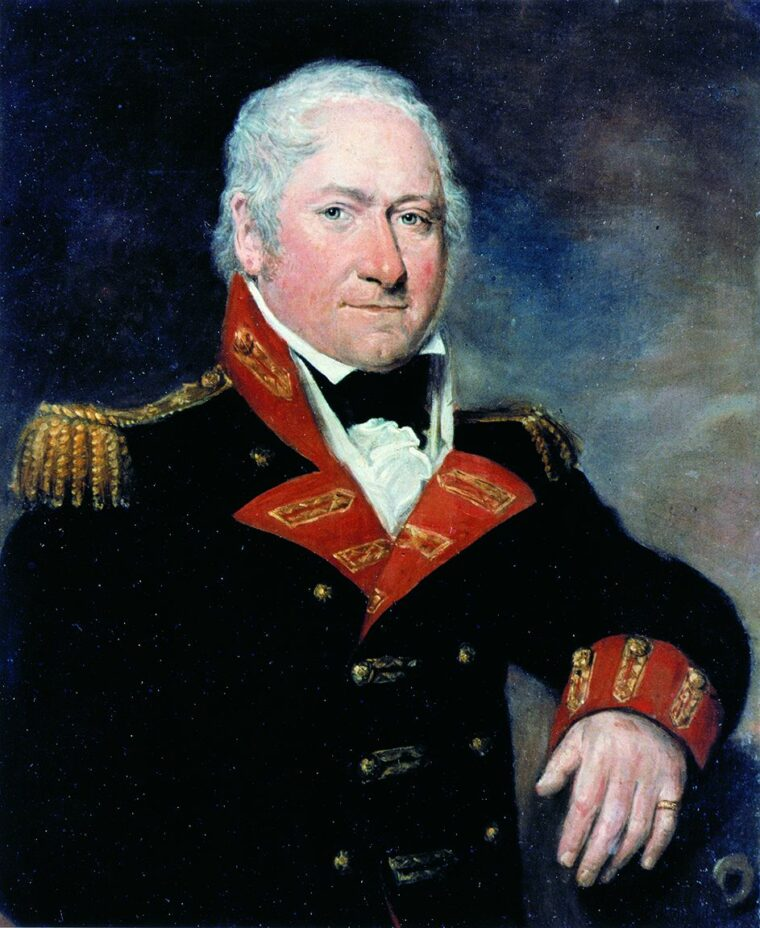
- 1817 portrait
- Born: 3 June 1761; Bradford on Avon, Wiltshire
- Died: 13 March 1842 (aged 80); Southampton, Hampshire
- Military career
- Allegiance: Great Britain; United Kingdom
- Branch: British Army
- Service years: 1779–1842
- Rank: Lieutenant-general
- Unit: Royal Artillery
- Conflicts: American War of Independence; French Revolutionary Wars; Flanders campaign (WIA); Napoleonic Wars

Lieutenant-General Henry Scrope Shrapnel (3 June 1761 – 13 March 1842) was a British Army officer who served in the American War of Independence and French Revolutionary and Napoleonic Wars. He invented the shrapnel shell, which was named after him.

== Biography ==
Henry Shrapnel was born at Midway Manor in Bradford-on-Avon, Wiltshire, England, the ninth child of Zachariah Shrapnel and his wife Lydia. He was commissioned as a Royal Artillery lieutenant in 1779, serving first in Newfoundland. He returned to England in 1784, when he began to experiment with hollow cannonballs filled with lead shot that burst in mid-air.

In 1787 he was posted to Gibraltar where he began demonstrations of his anti-personnel weapon which impressed senior officers commanding the fortress. From Gibraltar, Shrapnel was sent to the West Indies in 1791. Shrapnel served in Flanders, where he was wounded in 1793. He was promoted to major on 1 November 1803 after eight years as a captain.

In 1803, the British Army adopted a similar but elongated explosive shell which immediately acquired the inventor's name. It has lent the term "shrapnel" to fragmentation from artillery shells and fragmentation in general ever since, long after it was replaced by high-explosive rounds. Until the end of World War I, the shells were still manufactured according to his original principles.

After his invention's success in battle at Fort Nieuw-Amsterdam, Surinam, on 30 April 1804, Shrapnel was promoted to lieutenant colonel on 20 July 1804, less than nine months later.

In 1814, the British Government recognized Shrapnel's contribution by awarding him £1,200 (£82,600 in 2025) a year for life. Bureaucracy, however, prevented him from receiving the full benefit of this award. He was appointed to the office of colonel-commandant, Royal Artillery, on 6 March 1827. He rose to the rank of lieutenant general on 10 January 1837.

Shrapnel lived at Peartree House, near Peartree Green, Southampton, from about 1835 until his death.

His sister Rachel Shrapnel married the reverend Thomas Tregenna Biddulph. Gen. Sir Michael Anthony Shrapnel Biddulph was his great-nephew.

== See also ==
- List of British generals and brigadiers
- List of English inventors and designers
- 1804 in science
