= Michael Biddulph (British Army officer) =

General Sir Michael Biddulph GCB
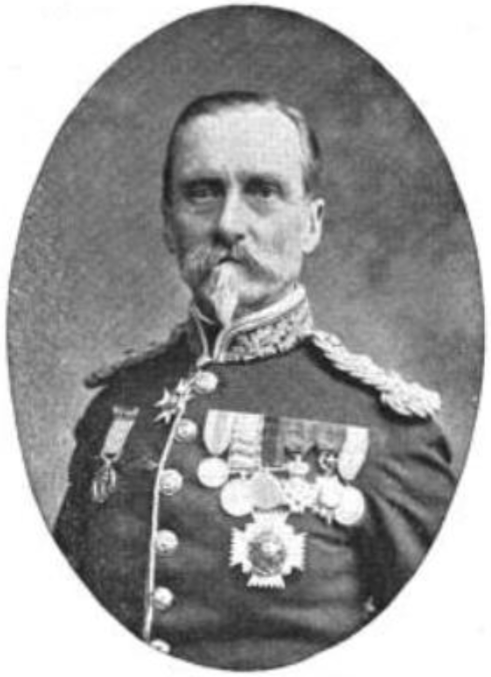
- In The Sketch, 29 May 1895
- Born: 30 July 1823; Cleeve Court, Somerset, England
- Died: 23 July 1904 (aged 80); London, England
- Military career
- Allegiance: United Kingdom
- Branch: British Army
- Service years: 1843–1890
- Rank: General
- Conflicts: Crimean War; Second Anglo-Afghan War
- Awards: Order of the Bath: *Knight Grand Cross (1895); *Knight Commander (1879); *Companion (1873); Order of the Medjidie, fifth class (Turkey) (1858); Chevalier of the Legion of Honour (France) (1857); Royal Humane Society silver medal, (1842)

General Sir Michael Anthony Shrapnel Biddulph GCB (30 July 1823 – 23 July 1904) was a British Army officer who became Black Rod, a parliamentary official.

== Military career ==
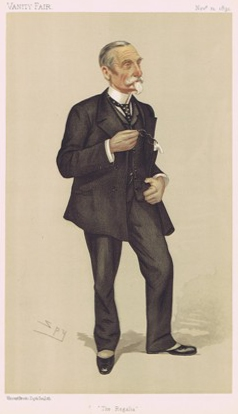
General Sir Michael Biddulph by Spy

Michael Biddulph was born in Cleeve Court, Somerset on 30 July 1823, the son of Rev. Shrapnel Biddulph. He was the grandson of Thomas Tregenna Biddulph, who married Rachel Shrapnel, sister of Lt. Gen. Henry Shrapnel, inventor of the shrapnel shell. Educated at the Royal Military Academy, Woolwich, he was commissioned into the Royal Artillery in 1843. He served in the Crimean War taking part in the Battles of Alma, Balaclava and Inkerman as well as the Siege of Sevastopol. Posted to India in 1861, he was appointed Deputy Adjutant-General of Artillery in India in 1868, and was promoted major-general in 1869.

In 1875, he was made commander of the Rohilkhand district, and in 1878 moved to command the garrison at Quetta, near the Afghanistan border. When the Second Afghan War became imminent, he established a base for operations in southern Afghanistan, taking command of the 2nd division of the Kandahar Field Force when war broke out in November 1878. His division advanced into Afghanistan, and Biddulph was present when Kandahar was occupied in January 1879. He returned to India later that month in command of the Thal-Chotiali Field Force. In 1880, he was given command of the Rawalpindi district in India and, after promotion to general in 1886, he served as President of the Ordnance Committee from 1887 until retirement in 1890.

In retirement he served as Gentleman Usher of the Black Rod from 1896 to 1904 and was an Extra Groom in Waiting to King Edward VII from 1901 to 1904. He also took to watercolour painting.

Biddulph died at his home in Whitehall Court, London on 23 July 1904 aged 80, and is buried at Kensal Green Cemetery.

== Family ==
In 1857 he married Katharine Stamati, and the couple had five sons and five daughters.

Government offices
Preceded by Sir James Drummond	Black Rod; 1895–1904	Succeeded by Sir Henry Stephenson
