= Thomas Tregenna Biddulph =

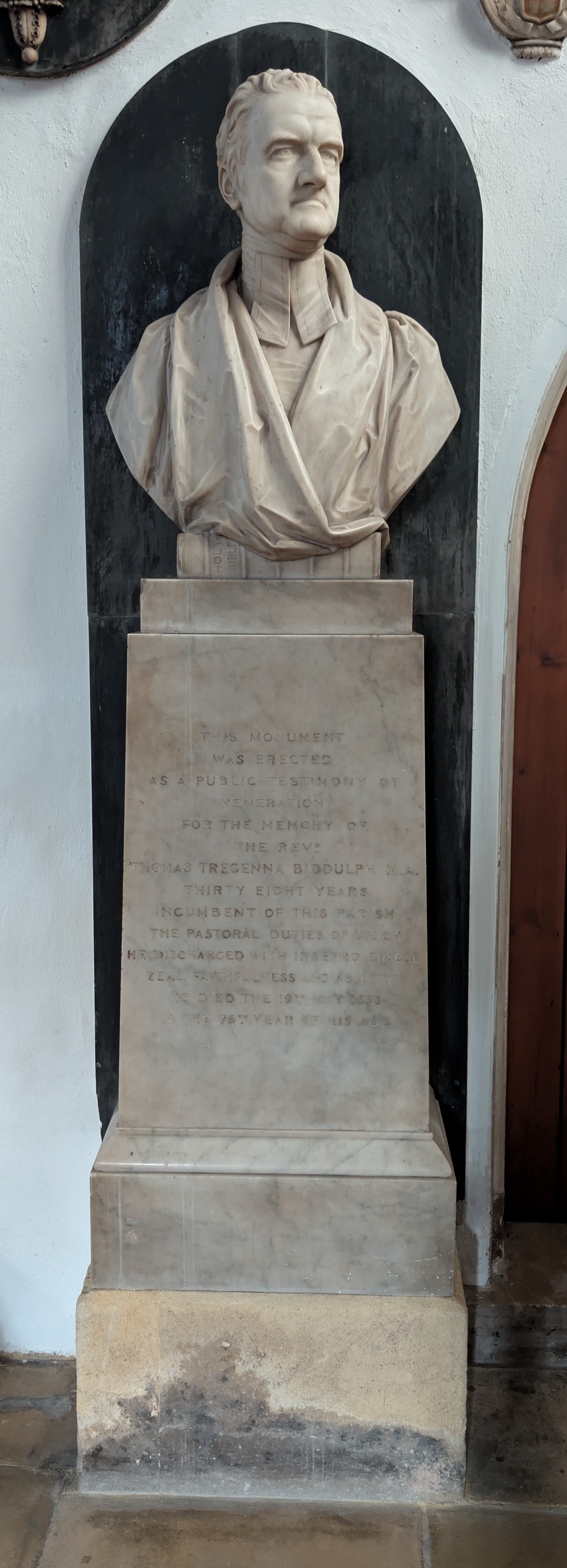
Monument to Thomas Tregenna Biddulph in the south aisle of St James' Priory

Thomas Tregenna Biddulph (1763–1838) was an English cleric, a leading evangelical in the Bristol area. He particularly opposed the evangelical secession around George Baring (1781–1854), the "western Schism".

== Life ==
He was the only son of the Rev. Thomas Biddulph by his first wife, Martha, daughter and coheir of Rev. John Tregenna, rector of Mawgan in Cornwall, and was born at Claines, Worcestershire, 5 July 1763; his father became in 1770 the vicar of Padstow in Cornwall. He was educated at Truro grammar school, and aged 17 matriculated at The Queen's College, Oxford (23 November 1780). He took his degrees of B.A. and M.A. in 1784 and 1787, respectively.

Biddulph was ordained deacon by John Ross, Bishop of Exeter, 26 September 1785, was licensed to the curacy of Padstow, and preached his first sermon in its church. After holding numerous curacies he became the incumbent of Bengeworth near Evesham in 1793. He retained this living for ten years, but mostly resided in Bristol, and it was as the incumbent from 1799 to 1838 of St. James's, Bristol, that his reputation as a preacher and a parish priest was acquired.

With ideas that were at first unpopular in Bristol, in time Biddulph became accepted. He died at St. James's Square, Bristol, 19 May 1838, and was buried 29 May. His monument in St James' Church Bristol was carved by Edward Hodges Baily.

He shared Hutchinsonian views with William Romaine.

== Works ==
A lengthy catalogue of Biddulph's writings is in Bibliotheca Cornubiensis. All his works were of evangelical doctrine and theology; he engaged in controversy with John Hey, Richard Warner, and Richard Mant. A periodical called at first Zion's Trumpet, then known for many years under as The Christian Guardian,' was set up him in 1798.

Among his other works, Biddulph authored, The Theology of the Early Patriarchs, Illustrated by an Appeal to Subsequent Parts of the Holy Scriptures (1825).

== Family ==
Biddulph's wife Rachel, daughter of Zachariah Shrapnel, whom he married at Bradford, Wiltshire, 19 February 1789. His brother-in-law was Lt.-Gen. Henry Shrapnel, inventor of the shrapnel shell.

He died at St. James's Square, Bristol, 10 August 1828.
