= Archibald Gordon (British Army officer) =

Archibald Gordon, M.D. (1812 – 3 August 1886) was a Scottish military surgeon and inspector-general of hospitals.

== Life ==
Gordon studied medicine at the University of Edinburgh, graduating with an MD in 1834. He entered the army as assistant-surgeon in 1836, served with the 53rd regiment in the Sutlej campaign of 1846, and in the Punjab campaign of 1848–9 with the 24th regiment. He became a surgeon in 1848, and surgeon-major in 1854.

In the Crimea War he was Principal Medical Officer of the 2nd division throughout the siege of Sebastopol, and was made deputy-inspector-general of hospitals (1856), C.B., and a Chevalier of the Legion of Honor. In 1857 he served as the principal medical officer with the expeditionary force to China in the Second Opium War and in the Oudh campaign of 1858-9. He became inspector-general in 1867 and retired in 1870. He was Honorary Surgeon to the Queen Victoria.

He was married to Mary Preston (née Crealock).

He died at West Hoathly, Sussex, on 3 August 1886.
