= Instructor of musketry =

British Army position

In the British Army, the Instructor of Musketry was a position within infantry battalions that existed from 1857 until 1883, with the position being held by a single officer from two to five years. In 1887 the position was brought back into use, with the new name of 'Assistant Adjutant'.
