= County court judge =

In England and Wales, from 1846 to 1971, a county court judge was a judge appointed under the terms of the County Courts Act 1846 (9 & 10 Vict. c. 95) to sit in the county courts. Each county court judge was assigned to a county court circuit.

== Appointment ==
They were initially appointed by the Lord Chancellor; after the enactment of the Administration of Justice Act 1956, they were directly appointed by the Queen.

== Salary ==
Their salary was initially £1,000. In 1852, a differential salary scheme was introduced whereby judges were paid £1,500, £1,350, or £1,200. In 1867, their salaries were uniformly set to £1,500. In 1937, it was raised to £2,000, and in 1952 it was raised to £2,800. Thereafter it was regularly adjusted upwards, up to £6,550 in 1969.

== Style and dress ==
From 1884, they were given the style of "His Honour" while in office. In 1919, they were given the right to continue to use the style after retirement by royal warrant, though they did not keep their places in the order of precedence after they retired.

They wore robes of purple and black, though they never had any official sanction and could not be worn at court functions.

Some county court judges received knighthoods; however, a demand for automatic knighthoods after fifteen years' service was rejected.

== End ==
The Courts Act 1971 made all county court judges circuit judges and ended further appointments of county court judges, heralding the end of a distinct county court bench.
