= Cecil Buckley =

Naval officer and Victoria Cross winner

Captain Cecil Buckley VC
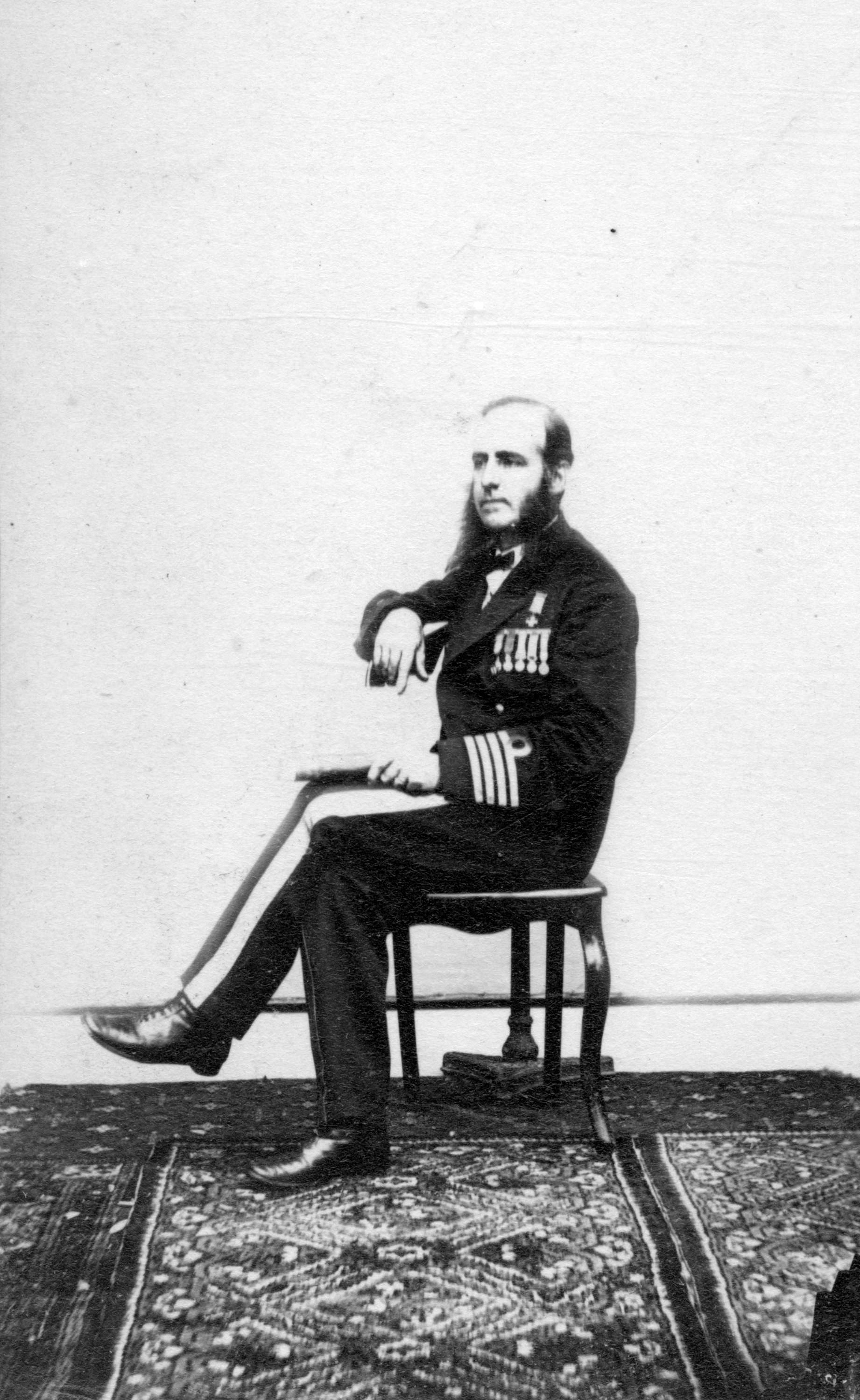
- Born: Cecil William Buckley; 7 October 1828; Eccles, Lancashire
- Died: 7 December 1872 (aged 44); Funchal, Madeira
- Burial place: British Cemetery of Funchal
- Military career
- Allegiance: United Kingdom
- Branch: Royal Navy
- Service years: 1845–1872
- Rank: Captain
- Units: HMS Miranda
- Conflicts: Crimean War
- Awards: Victoria Cross; Légion d'Honneur; Order of the Medjidie; Baltic Medal; Crimea Medal with clasps for Sebastopol and Azoff; Turkish Crimea Medal

Captain Cecil William Buckley VC (7 October 1828 – 7 December 1872) was an English recipient of the Victoria Cross, the highest and most prestigious award for gallantry in the face of the enemy that can be awarded to British and Commonwealth forces.

== Life ==
Buckley was born at Patricroft, near Eccles in Lancashire, and entered the Royal Navy in 1845. On the outbreak of the war with Russia in 1854, he was serving as a lieutenant on the frigate HMS Miranda, sent first to the White Sea then, in early 1855, to the Black Sea, and the Sea of Azov.

=== VC action ===
He was a 26 year old lieutenant when the following deeds took place during the Sea of Azov naval campaign of 1855, for which he was awarded the VC, as cited in the London Gazette:

"Whilst serving as junior Lieutenant of the Miranda, [Cecil William Buckley] landed in presence of a superior force, and set fire to the Russian stores [on two occasions]."

The first service ... occurred after the shelling of the town of Genitchi, on the 29th May, 1855. After mentioning that the stores were in a very favourable position for supplying the Russian Army, and that, therefore, their destruction was of the utmost importance, "Lieutenant Cecil W. Buckley, Lieutenant Hugh T. Burgoyne, and Mr John Robarts, gunner, volunteered to land alone, and fire the stores, which offer I accepted, knowing the imminent risk there would be in landing a party in presence of such a superior force, and out of gun-shot of the ships. This very dangerous service they most gallantly performed, narrowly escaping the Cossacks, who all but cut them off from their boat." Despatch from Admiral Lord Lyons, 2nd June 1855, No. 419.

The second volunteer service was performed while the town of Taganrog was being bombarded by the boats of the Fleet: "Lieutenant Cecil Buckley, in a four-oared gig, accompanied by Mr Henry Cooper, Boatswain, and manned by volunteers, repeatedly landed and fired the different stores and Government buildings. This dangerous, not to say desperate service (carried out in a town containing upwards of 3,000 troops, constantly endeavouring to prevent it, and only checked by the fire of the boats' guns), was most effectually performed." Despatch from Admiral Lord Lyons, 6th June 1855, No, 429.

He was among the first winners of the VC to be gazetted on 24 February 1857, together with Burgoyne, Robarts and Cooper.

=== Later career ===
In February 1856, in acknowledgement of his services, Buckley was promoted to commander. After serving on the Cape station, he was promoted to captain in April 1862. From 1868 to 1870 he commanded the Pylades, a wooden screw corvette, on the Pacific station and from December 1871 the Valiant, a guard ship in the Shannon Estuary. Buckley retired from the Navy in October 1872 due to poor health. He died on the island of Madeira, Portugal on 7 December 1872, and was buried in the British Cemetery of Funchal.

He had married Catharine Senhouse, by whom he had son and a daughter.
