= James Browne (British Army officer) =

Anglo-Irish army officer (1823–1910)

General Sir James Browne KCB
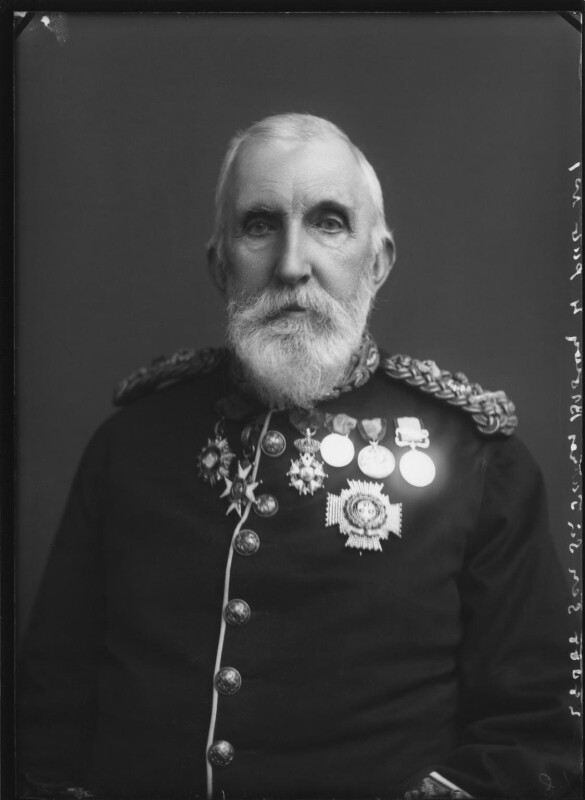
- Photographic portrait by Alexander Bassano (1898)
- Born: 24 April 1823; Dublin, United Kingdom of Great Britain and Ireland
- Died: 6 December 1910 (aged 87); London, United Kingdom
- Burial place: Brompton Cemetery
- Education: Royal Military Academy
- Spouse: Mary Hunt (m. 1850; died 1888)
- Children: 2 daughters
- Relatives: Montague Browne (father); Lodge de Montmorency, 1st Viscount Frankfort de Montmorency (maternal grandfather); James Browne, 2nd Baron Kilmaine (paternal grandfather)
- Military career
- Allegiance: United Kingdom
- Branch: British Army; Royal Engineers
- Service years: 1842–1888
- Rank: General
- Conflicts: Crimean War; Siege of Sevastopol; Battle of the Great Redan (WIA)

General Sir James Frankfort Manners Browne KCB (24 April 1823 – 6 December 1910), Colonel-Commandant of Royal Engineers, was an Anglo-Irish officer in the British Army.

== Origins and education ==
James Frankfort Manners Browne, born in Dublin on 24 April 1823, was the eldest son of Henry Montague Browne, Dean of Lismore, second son of James Caulfeild Browne, 2nd Lord Kilmaine. His mother was Catherine Penelope (died 1858), daughter of Lodge Evans Morres, 1st Viscount Frankfort de Montmorency.

Educated at Epsom and at Mr. Miller's at Woolwich, he became a gentleman cadet of the Royal Military Academy, Woolwich on 15 May 1838. On 1 January 1842 he received a commission as second lieutenant in the Royal Engineers.

== British North America ==
After serving at Woolwich and in Ireland, Browne embarked for Halifax, Nova Scotia, in March 1845, and on 1 April was promoted to lieutenant. In November 1846 he was transferred to Quebec. In June 1847 he was sent on special service to Fort Garry in the Red River Settlement, Hudson's Bay Territory (now Manitoba), where a detachment of Royal Artillery, another of Royal Sappers and Miners, and three companies of the 6th Foot had been quartered since the summer of 1846 in connection with the Oregon boundary settlement. Browne took two months to reach the inaccessible spot now known as Winnipeg, and was engaged in surveying, superintending the clearance of forest, and pioneer work generally. In August 1848 the force was withdrawn, and Browne went back to Quebec.

== The Crimea ==
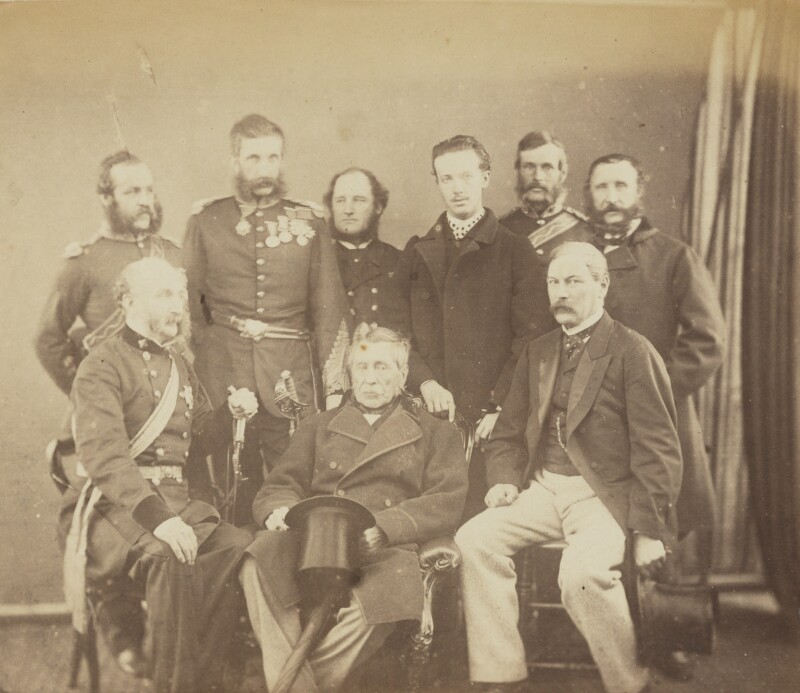
Officers connected with the Crimean War, with Browne at far left in the back row (1860s)

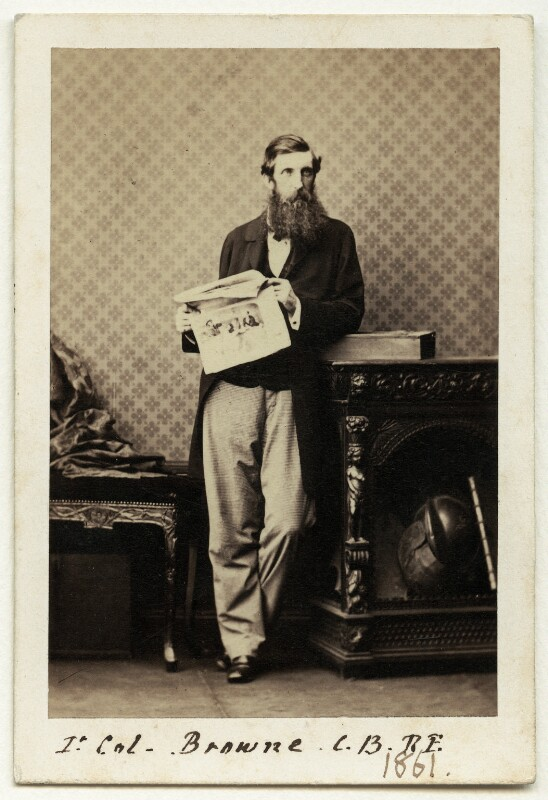
Lt. Col. Browne C.B. R.E. (1861)

In the autumn of 1851 he was in Ireland, doing duty first at Clonmel, and then at Kilkenny. Promoted second captain on 7 February 1854, he went to Chatham in July to take command of the 1st Company of Royal sappers and Miners. He put it through a course of field work instruction, and on 5 January 1855 embarked with it for the Crimea. On reaching Balaclava on 5 February, Browne and his company were soon moved to the trenches of the British right attack on Sevastopol, and remained there until near the end of August.

On 22 March 1855, and again on 5 April, Browne took part in the repulse of sorties made in force by the Russians. He was promoted to first captain on 1 June and was the Senior Executive Officer of Engineers on 7 June, when he rendered conspicuous service in the successful attack on the quarry outworks covering the Redan. The execution of the arrangements as well as the general superintendence of the work was in his hands. Captain (afterwards Field-marshal Viscount) Wolseley of the 90th Foot was his assistant engineer, and Browne reported in high terms of his conduct. Browne was mentioned in the despatches both of Sir Harry Jones (8 June) and of Lord Raglan (9 June). On 17 July he received a brevet majority.

When Lieutenant-colonel Richard Tylden, of the Royal Engineers, director of the right attack, was fatally wounded on 18 June 1855, his duties devolved on Browne. But on 24 August Browne was severely wounded, and on 18 November was invalided home. He was mentioned in Sir Harry Jones's despatch of 9 September 1855.

For his services in the Crimea Browne was created CB (military division) and a Knight of the Legion of Honour; he received the British Crimea Medal with clasp for Sevastopol, the Sardinian Crimea Medal, the Turkish Crimea Medal, the Order of the Medjidie (Fifth Class), and a second brevet, that of lieutenant-colonel, was gazetted on 26 December 1856. A pension of 200l. a year, awarded him for three years, was afterwards made permanent.

== Later career ==
Recovering his health at the end of 1856, Browne was quartered in Dublin until July 1859, when he went out to India to command the Engineers in the Bombay Presidency, with headquarters at Poona; in March 1860 he went on to Mauritius as Commanding Royal Engineer, and in August 1861 he returned home to become superintendent of military discipline (afterwards called assistant-commandant) at Chatham, where he was second in command. He was promoted to brevet-colonel on 26 December 1864, and regimental lieutenant-colonel on 2 May 1865.

On 1 January 1866 Browne was moved to headquarters at the War Office, as assistant adjutant-general for royal engineers, on the staff of the commander-in-chief, and five years later he was appointed Deputy Adjutant-General. In July 1870 he was a member of the committee on the pay of officers of the Royal Artillery and Royal Engineers, and in January 1873 on the admission of university men to the scientific corps. He was awarded a distinguished service pension in October 1871.

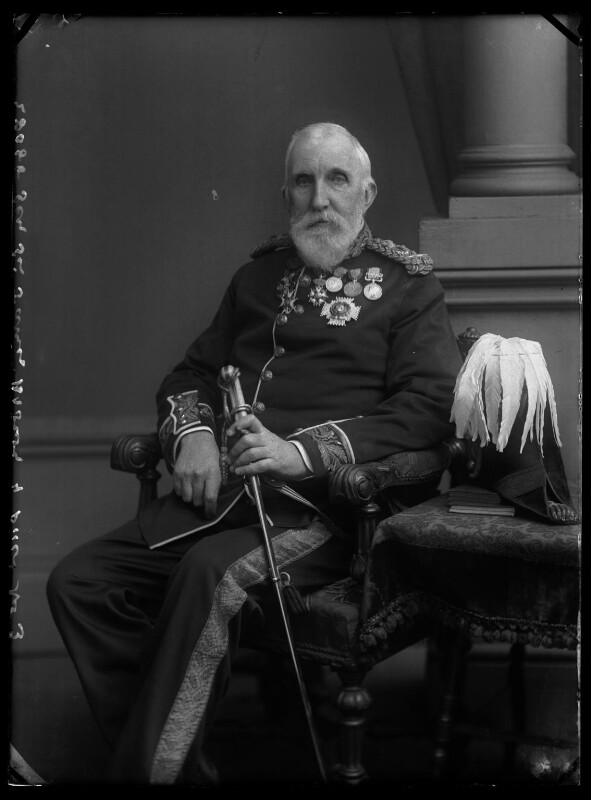
General Browne, aged 73–75, in full dress uniform (1898)

On 1 January 1876 Browne was appointed colonel on the staff, and Commanding Royal Engineer of the South-Eastern District, with his headquarters at Dover; but his promotion to be major-general on 2 October 1877 (afterwards antedated to 22 February 1870) placed him on the half-pay list. For seven years from 2 June 1880 he was Governor of the Royal Military Academy at Woolwich; was promoted to lieutenant-general on 13 August 1881; was placed on the unemployed list in 1887, and was promoted to general on 12 February 1888.

== Retirement and death ==
Browne retired on a pension on 5 May 1888. On 6 April 1890 he was made a Colonel-Commandant of Royal Engineers, and on 26 May 1894 was created KCB. He died at his residence, 19 Roland Gardens, London, on 6 December 1910, and was buried in Brompton Cemetery.

== Personal life ==
On 24 April 1850 Browne married, at Quebec, Mary (died 1888), daughter of James Hunt of Quebec, by whom he had two daughters, both unmarried. A portrait in oils, painted by Charles Lutyens, entered the possession of his daughters.

== Honours ==
- Knight commander of the order of the Bath
- Knight of the Legion of Honour
- Order of the Medjidieh Fifth Class
- Crimea Medal (with clasp for Sevastopol)
- Sardinian Crimea Medal
- Turkish Crimea Medal
