= Crimean War medal =

Crimean War medal may refer to:

- British Crimean War Medal
- Turkish Crimean War medal
- Sardinian Crimea Medal
- Baltic Medal, awarded for naval operations in the Baltic
