= General Krasnov (disambiguation) =

Pyotr Krasnov (1869–1947) was an Imperial Russian Army lieutenant general. General Krasnov may refer to:

- Ivan Krasnov (1802–1871), Imperial Russian Army lieutenant general
- Nikolay Krasnov (soldier) (1833–1900), Imperial Russian Army lieutenant general
