= Krasnov =

Krasnov (Russian: Краснов), feminine: Krasnova is a Russian family name. Derived from the word krasny (Russian: красный), an adjective meaning "red", in old Russian "beautiful".

According to a 2019 study, it was the 167th most popular surname in Russia.

Notable people with the surname include:

- Aleksandr Krasnov (born 1960), Russian cyclist
- Aleksandr Krasnov (astronomer) (1866–1911), Russian astronomer
- Andrei Krasnov (1862–1914), Russian botanist and biogeographer
- Angelina Zhuk-Krasnova (born 7 February 1991), Russian pole vaulter
- Danny Krasnov (born 1970), Soviet-Israeli pole vaulter
- Ivan Krasnov (1802–1871), general, author and father of Nikolay Krasnov
  - Nikolay Krasnov (soldier) (1833–1900), major-general and father of Pyotr Krasnov
    - Pyotr Krasnov (1869–1947), lieutenant-general and member of the White movement during the Russian Civil War and a Nazi collaborator during World War II, and father of Semyon Krasnov
      - Semyon Krasnov, member of the White movement during the Russian Civil War and father of Mikhail Semyonovich Krasnov
        - Mikhail Semyonovich Krasnov (born 1946), Chilean military official involved in human rights violations
- Mikhail Krasnov (died 1979), speedway rider from the Soviet Union
- Nikolay Krasnov (architect) (1864-1939), Russian and Yugoslav architect
- Vera Krasnova (born 1950), Russian speed skater
- Vladimir Krasnov (born 1990), Russian Olympic sprinter
- Zoya Krasnova (1938–2014), Soviet and Russian worker, Hero of Socialist Labour, Communist Party functionary

== Fictional characters ==
- Fyodor Krasnov, a fictional character in the 2023 Chilean black comedy horror film El Conde
- Yevgenia Nikolayevna Krasnova, a fictional character in the 2007 book The Black Swan: The Impact of the Highly Improbable by Nassim Nicholas Taleb

== See also ==
- Asset Krasnov
