= HMS Ardent (1841) =

Sloop of the Royal Navy

- The design profile of the Chatham-built Alecto-class sloops

History

United Kingdom
- Name: HMS Ardent
- Ordered: 25 February 1939
- Builder: Chatham Dockyard
- Cost: £28,593
- Laid down: February 1840
- Launched: 12 February 1841
- Commissioned: 16 September 1842
- Out of service: 1864
- Fate: Broken up 1865

General characteristics
- Class & type: Alecto-class sloop
- Displacement: 878 tons
- Tons burthen: 800 bm
- Length: 164 ft (50 m) (gundeck); 142 ft 6 in (43.43 m) (keel)
- Beam: 32 ft 8 in (9.96 m)
- Depth of hold: 18 ft 7 in (5.66 m)
- Installed power: 200 nhp; 370 ihp (280 kW)
- Propulsion: Seaward and Capel 2-cylinder direct-acting steam engine; Paddle wheels
- Sail plan: Brig rigged
- Speed: c. 9 kn (17 km/h)
- Armament: 2 × 32-pounder (56cwt) pivot guns; 2 × 32-pounder (25cwt) guns

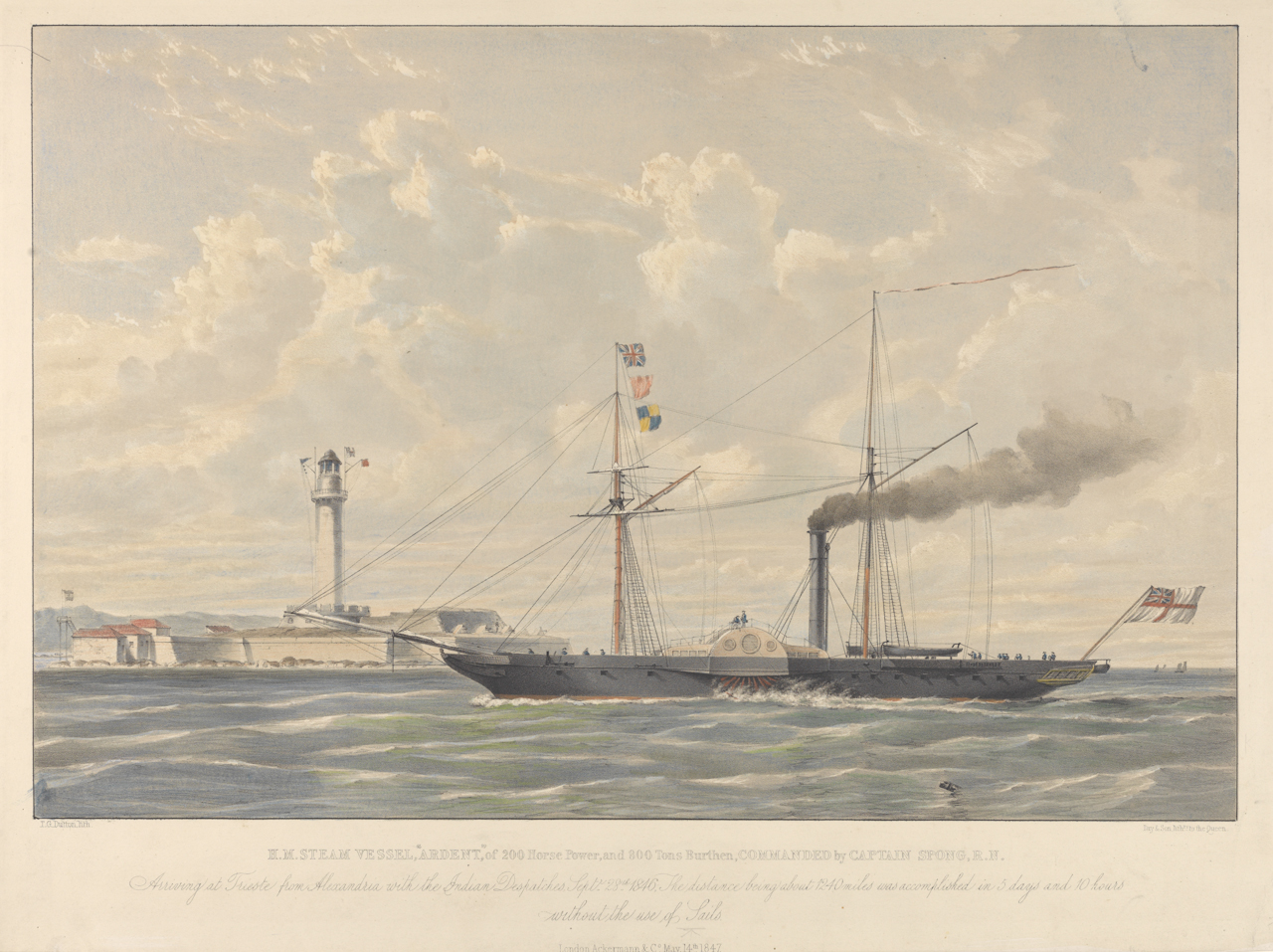
H.M. Steam Vessel Ardent - Arriving at Trieste from Alexandria with the Indian Despatches 28 September 1846

HMS Ardent was a wooden Alecto-class paddle sloop, and the fourth ship of the Royal Navy to use the name. She was launched on 12 February 1841 at Chatham and spent much of her career on the West Coast of Africa engaged in anti-slavery operations. One of the ship's company, Gunner John Robarts, was awarded the Victoria Cross for the destruction of Russian food stores in the Crimean War. She was scrapped in 1865.

== Design and construction ==
Ardent was ordered on 25 February 1839 as the third of a class of 5 third-class steam vessels. (Note: The fifth of the class, Rattler, had originally been ordered as a Driver-class second-class steam vessel, was amended to the Alecto design and then re-ordered as a screw vessel. She famously competed against her sister Alecto in a tug-of-war which proved the benefits of screw propulsion over paddles.) She was laid down in February 1840, and on 15 August orders were received to hasten her building and to complete her as a packet. She was launched on 12 February 1841. She was 164 feet (50 m) long on the gundeck and displaced 878 tons. Power for her paddles came from a Seaward & Capel 2-cylinder direct-acting steam engine developing 200 nominal horsepower, which was fitted at Woolwich in February 1841. Having conducted engine trials in the River Thames in April 1841, she left Woolwich for Chatham to be fitted out. She was commissioned for the first time at Chatham on 16 September 1842.

== Service history ==
She sailed for South America and the Cape station from Portsmouth on 1 October 1841, touching at Madeira during her passage. In 1845 she transferred from the Brazilian station to the West Coast of Africa, where she was involved in the long campaign to put down the slave trade.

On 25 March 1845 detained the Spanish slave brigantine Dos Hermanos off the Pongo River, which was condemned on 9 April 1845 by the Mixed British and Spanish Court at Sierra Leone. She returned to England in September 1845.

In 1848, she was serving in the Mediterranean, On 21 December, she rescued the survivors of HMS Mutine, which had been wrecked at Chioggia, Kingdom of Lombardy–Venetia with the loss of five of her crew. She saw active service during the Crimean War. On 29 May 1855 in the Sea of Azov, Crimea, Gunner Robarts of Ardent with two lieutenants (Cecil William Buckley of Miranda and Hugh Talbot Burgoyne of Swallow) volunteered to land on a beach where the Russian army were in strength. They were out of covering gunshot range of the ships offshore and met considerable enemy opposition, but managed to set fire to corn stores and ammunition dumps and destroy enemy equipment before embarking again. They were each awarded the Victoria Cross.

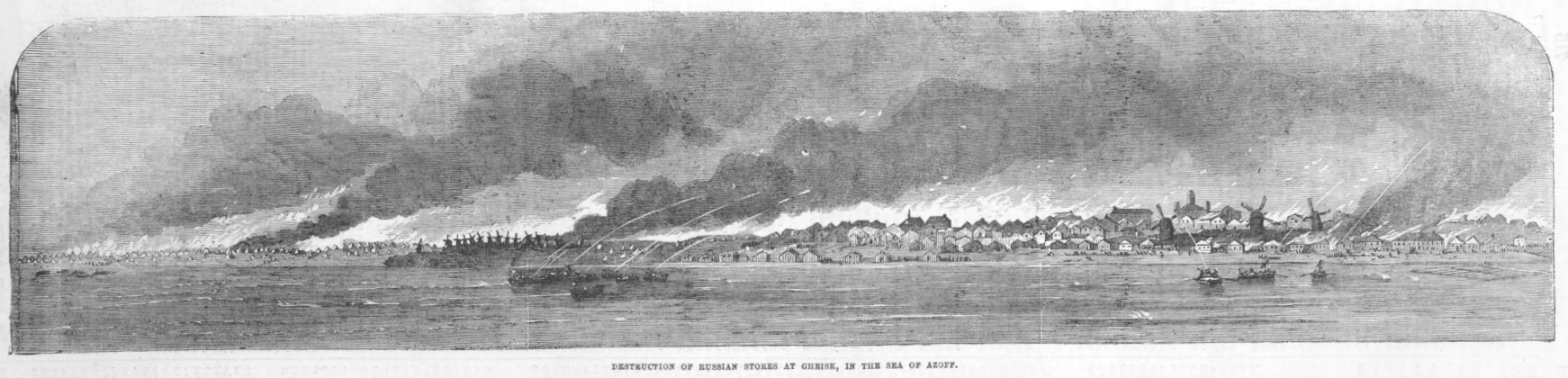
She attended the destruction of Russian stores at Gheisk, in the sea of Azoff, 5 November 1855, Illustrated London News

She returned to Portsmouth on 5 February 1856 and sailed for the West Coast of Africa on 28 December 1857 for anti-slavery duties. The station was notorious for sickness, and during the year 1858 she reported 238 cases of sickness during the year(from a ship's company numbering less than 150), with ten cases serious enough to require the sick were invalided home. She returned to the United Kingdom in March 1859 and by 1860 had returned to South America.

== Fate ==
Ardent was sold to Castle and arrived at Charlton for breaking on 2 March 1865.
