= HMS Miranda (1851) =

Sloop of the Royal Navy

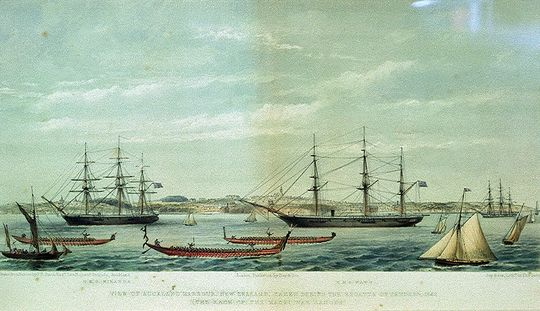
- HMS Miranda (left) and HMS Fawn (right) during the Regatta of January, 1862 ("the race of the Maori war canoes")

History

United Kingdom
- Name: HMS Miranda
- Ordered: 25 April 1847; Re-ordered 3 November 1847
- Builder: Royal Dockyard, Sheerness
- Cost: £48,393
- Laid down: September 1848
- Launched: 18 March 1851
- Completed: 9 March 1854
- Commissioned: 25 February 1854
- Honours and awards: Baltic 1854, Sea of Azov 1855
- Fate: Sold for breaking 2 December 1869

General characteristics
- Class & type: Screw sloop; Reclassified as a corvette by 1862
- Displacement: 1,523 tons
- Tons burthen: 1039 16/94 bm
- Length: 196 ft 0 in (59.74 m) gundeck; 169 ft (52 m) keel for tonnage
- Beam: 34 ft (10 m) for tonnage
- Draught: 13 ft 6 in (4.11 m)
- Depth of hold: 20 ft 9 in (6.32 m)
- Installed power: Indicated 613 hp (457 kW)
- Propulsion: Two-cylinder horizontal single-expansion geared steam engine driving a single screw
- Sail plan: Ship-rigged
- Speed: 10.75 kn (19.91 km/h) under power
- Armament: as built; 14 × 32-pdr (42cwt) MLSB guns; by 1856; 1 × 68-pdr (87cwt) MLSB gun; 10 × 32-pdr (42cwt) MLSB guns; 4 × 20-pdr RBL guns

HMS Miranda was a 14-gun (15-gun from 1856) wooden screw-sloop of the Royal Navy. She was ordered on 25 April 1847 with the name Grinder from Royal Dockyard, Sheerness, but on 3 November 1847 was reordered as Miranda.

She was launched in 1851 and served in the Crimean War. In 1854 she was in the White Sea and participated in the bombardment of the Port of Kola. Her commander Edmund Moubray Lyons was killed in action on 17 June 1855 in her night attack on Fort Constantine. Two of her crew were awarded the Victoria Cross. During the 1860s she served on the Australia Station during the New Zealand Wars and was reclassified as a corvette by 1862.

Grinder would have been the second vessel of that name in the Royal Navy: it was born by a tender of unknown origin which was sold on 22 August 1832. Miranda was the first vessel of that name in the Royal Navy.

== Construction and specifications ==
She was designed, as part of the 1847 Programme by John Fincham, Master Shipwright of Portsmouth, as an improvement of the Rattler, and was approved on 3 November 1847. Her keel was laid in September 1848 at Royal Dockyard, Sheerness; she was launched on 18 March 1851. Her gundeck was 196 ft 0 in (59.74 m) with her keel length reported for tonnage calculation of 169 feet 169 ft 0 in (51.51 m). Her breadth reported for tonnage was 34 ft 0 in (10.36 m). She had a depth of hold of 20 ft 9 in (6.32 m). Her builder's measure tonnage was 1,039 tons (as built 1,062) and displaced 1,350 tons.

Her machinery was supplied by Robert Napier & Sons of Govan. She shipped two rectangular fire tube boilers. Her engine was a 2-cylinder horizontal-single-expansion geared steam-engine with cylinders of 56.375 in (1,431.9 mm) in diameter with a 36.75 in (933 mm) stroke, rated at 250 horsepower (190 kW). She had a single-screw propeller driven through gearing. Her machinery was installed at Robert Napier and Sons shipyard in Glasgow at a cost of £14,235 during 1852. The pictorial record shows Miranda with a full ship rig in 1862, which makes it likely that she carried this rig for her entire life.

Her initial armament consisted of fourteen Monk's ‘C’ 1839 32-pounder 42 hundredweight (cwt) muzzle-loading smoothbore (MLSB) 8.5-foot solid-shot guns on broadside trucks. In 1856 she was rearmed with a single 68-pounder MLSB of 87 cwt 10-foot solid-shot gun on a pivot mount and ten Monk's ‘C’ 1839 32-pounder 42 cwt MLSB solid-shot guns plus four Armstrong 20-pounder breech-loading (BL) of 16 cwt on broadside trucks.

=== Trials ===
During trials, Miranda's engine generated 613 indicated horsepower (457 kW) for a speed of 10.75 kn (19.91 km/h).

Miranda was completed for sea on 9 March 1854 at a cost of £48,393 (including £24,232 for the hull, £14,235 for the machinery, and £9,926 for the fitting).

== Commissioned service ==
=== First commission ===
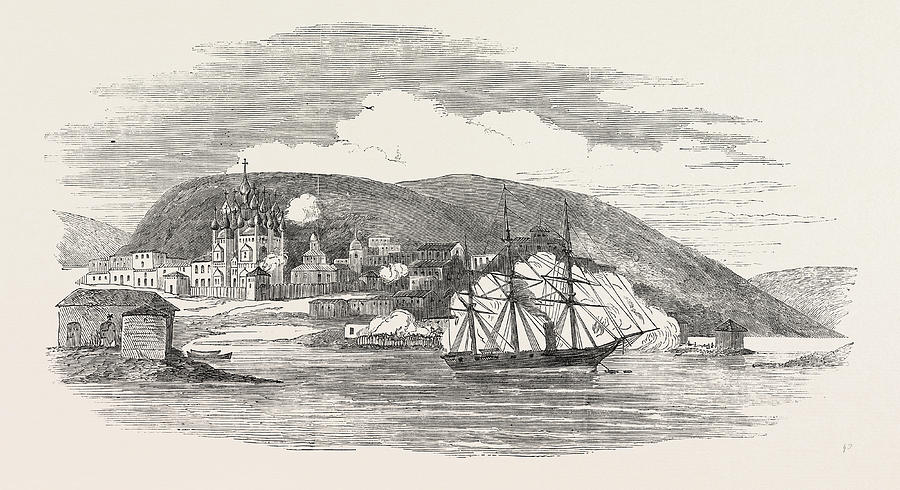
HMS Miranda bombards Kola

She commissioned at Sheerness on 25 February 1854 under the command of Captain Edmund Moubray Lyons for service in the Baltic Sea during the Crimean War. She did not sail for the Baltic; instead she joined Captain Erasmus Ommanney's Squadron for service in the White Sea. The squadron, consisting of Eurydice, Miranda, Brisk, and two French ships, scoured the White Sea for Russian ships. Not finding any Russian ships, the Squadron destroyed the port of Kola on 24 August before withdrawing before the onset of winter. Her crew received the Baltic medal even though she did not serve in the Baltic. She returned to Portsmouth in September 1854.

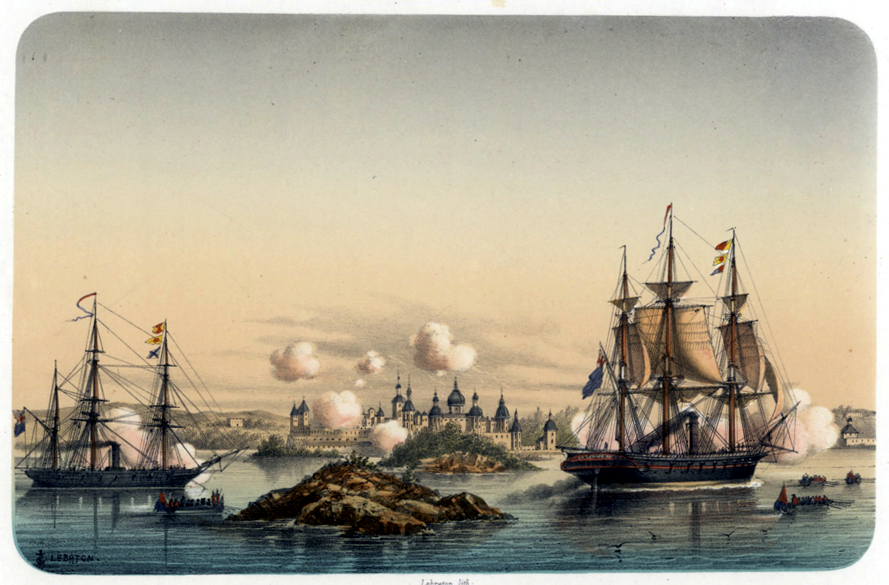
Attack on the small town of Novitska (near Kola) by the corvette HMS Brisk and Miranda, August 1854.

In 1855, she deployed to the Black Sea for operations in the Sea of Azov. On 3 June 1855, during the Siege of Taganrog, Boatswain Henry Cooper and Lieutenant Cecil William Buckley of Miranda landed destroying equipment and set fire to government buildings, despite the town being under bombardment and garrisoned by 3,000 Russian troops. For this action the pair were awarded the Victoria Cross. Lyons, her commander, reported on 29 May 1855 that in the first four days of the squadron entering the Sea of Azov, the enemy had lost four steamers of war and 246 merchant vessels, together with corn and flour magazines to the value of at least £150,000. Lyons was then killed in action on 17 June 1855 in her night attack on Fort Constantine, in which he was fatally wounded by a piece of shell that embedded itself in his left leg. Captain Robert Hall took command on 24 June as the senior officer in the Strait of Kerch. Upon the cessation of hostilities, Miranda returned to Britain, paying off at Sheerness on 21 April 1857.

=== Second commission ===
Miranda was recommissioned at Sheerness on 4 October 1860 under the command of Commander Henry C. Glyn, for the Australia Station. During the early 1860s she took part in the New Zealand Wars under Captain Robert Jenkins. She was used to land troops at Pūkorokoro, Waikato, which was later renamed Miranda in her honour. She returned to Sheerness to decommission on 3 June 1865 and was sold to C. Lewis for breaking on 2 December 1869.
