= John Robarts (VC) =

Recipient of the Victoria Cross

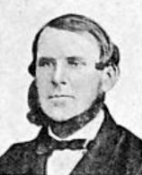
- Born: c. 1818; Chacewater, Cornwall, England
- Died: 17 October 1888 (aged 69–70); Southsea, Portsmouth, England
- Burial place: Highland Road Cemetery, Portsmouth
- Military career
- Allegiance: United Kingdom
- Branch: Royal Navy
- Service years: 1842–1875
- Rank: Chief Gunner
- Units: HMS Wellesley; HMS Ardent
- Conflicts: First Opium War; Crimean War
- Awards: Victoria Cross

John Robarts VC (c. 1818 – 17 October 1888) was an English recipient of the Victoria Cross, the highest and most prestigious award for gallantry in the face of the enemy that can be awarded to British and Commonwealth forces.

Robarts was born in Chacewater, Cornwall, and joined the Royal Navy in 1842. He was about 37 years old, and a gunner in the Royal Navy during the Crimean War when the following deed took place for which he was awarded the VC.

On 29 May 1855 in the Sea of Azov, Crimea, Gunner Robarts of HMS Ardent with two lieutenants, Cecil Buckley and Hugh Burgoyne, one from HMS Miranda and the other from HMS Swallow, volunteered to land on a beach where the Russian army were in strength. They were out of covering gunshot range of the ships offshore and met considerable enemy opposition, but managed to set fire to corn stores and ammunition dumps and destroy enemy equipment before embarking again. Buckley and Burgoyne were also awarded the Victoria Cross.

== Later life ==
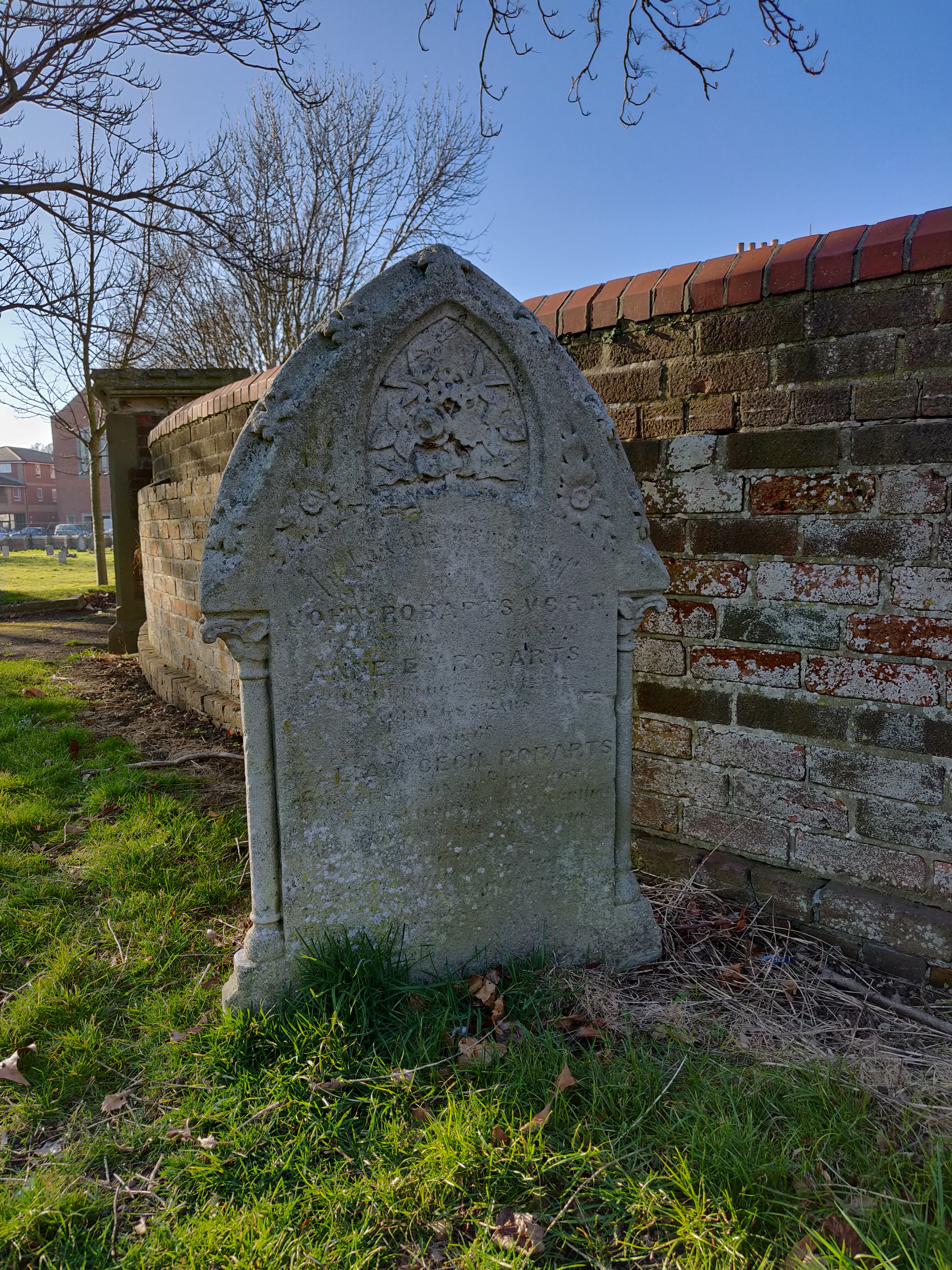
Grave of John Robarts V.C.

In the 1881 Census he is recorded as living at Providence House, 4 Park Lane, Southsea where he died of heart disease, aged 68 in 1888.
