= British Cemetery of Funchal =

Cemetery in Funchal, Madeira

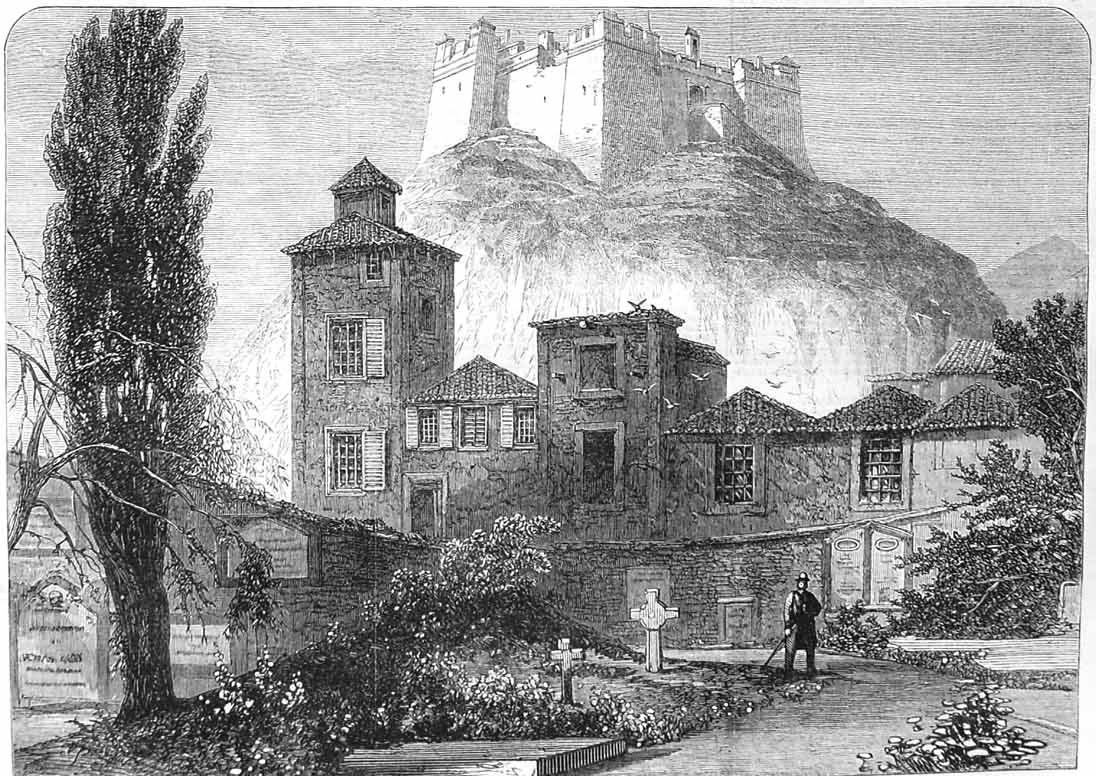
- British Cemetery sketch in 1866
- Interactive map of British Cemetery of Funchal

Details
- Established: 1770
- Location: Funchal, Madeira
- Country: Portugal
- Coordinates: 32°38′56″N 16°54′59″W
- Type: Anglican cemetery
- Website: Official website

The British Cemetery of Funchal is on the Portuguese island of Madeira.

== History ==
The British Cemetery dates its origin from 1770. Prior to this date, Madeiran law dictated that the mortal remains of those deceased who were not Roman Catholic by faith were to be buried at sea, thrown from the cliffs at Garajau; later, a statue of Christ, called Cristo Rei, was erected in remembrance of this.

However, from 1772 onward, British interests in Madeira secured a burial ground, called the Nation´s Burial Ground, close to the original city walls of Funchal. The site of this earlier cemetery is taken up by a small public square and car showrooms today. All remains and headstones etc were moved in 1890 to an extensive adjoining plot, which incorporates a British military cemetery (dating from 1808) and chapel (1865 onwards).

Although named the British Cemetery and administered by the Anglican church of the Holy Trinity (an example of early 19th-century Neo-Classical architecture) nearby, the cemetery holds graves of many nationalities, including a large number of German Protestants.

The cemetery contains three British Commonwealth war grave burials of the First World War and three from the Second World War, all seamen of the Royal or Merchant navies.

There is free public access to the cemetery and limited public access to its archives.

== Notable interments ==
- Paul Langerhans, discovered the Islets of Langerhans in the pancreas
- Captain Cecil Buckley, the first to be gazetted with the Victoria Cross, in 1875
- George Oruigbiji Pepple, ruled the Kingdom of Bonny, now part of Nigeria
- William Reid, founder of the Reid's Palace Hotel in Funchal
- Sarah Forbes Bonetta, Nigerian princess and god-daughter of Queen Victoria
- Evelyn Everett-Green (1856–1932), British romantic novelist
