= Siege of Taganrog =

1855 battle of the Crimean War

- Part of the Crimean War
Date	3 June 1855 – 24 November 1855 (Note: All dates are New Style)
Location	Taganrog, Russian Empire 47°12′15″N 38°56′32″E
Result	See "Conclusion"

Belligerents
Russia	United Kingdom; France

Commanders and leaders
(Russia) Yegor Tolstoy (Russia) Ivan Krasnov (Russia) Yevgeny Pfeilizer-Frank	(United Kingdom) Edmund Lyons (France) Armand Joseph Bruat (France) Béral de Sedaiges

Strength
(Russia) Russia; 3,200 men 3 warships: Унылая ("Cheerless"); Секстант ("Sextant"); Акерманъ ("Akkerman"); 2 barges 3 armed launches	(United Kingdom) United Kingdom; 2 paddle gunboats 1 armed raft 1 unarmed paddle tug 1 unarmed steam packet 12 armed launches (France) France; 2 paddle gunboats 4 launches

Casualties and losses
470 killed and wounded, including civilians 3 warships destroyed	1 wounded 3 prisoners 1 gunboat destroyed

The siege of Taganrog is a name given in some Russian histories to Anglo-French naval operations in the Sea of Azov between June and November 1855 during the Crimean War. British and French forces were implementing a strategy of destroying the supply lines for the main Russian army which ran through the Sea of Azov. Taganrog was one of the major logistical hubs of the Russian army and was attacked and its military depot destroyed on 3 June 1855 as part of a series of attacks on all major Russian supply bases in the area, except Rostov-on-Don, which could not be reached due to the large shoals not admitting any available warship.

== Prelude ==
In the spring of 1855, as the Crimean War dragged on into its third year, the British and the French decided to begin operations in the Sea of Azov. They reasoned that this would allow them to cut off Crimea even further from Russia and prevent further supplies from reaching Russian forces there by sea via the seaports in the Taman. This strategy required them to occupy the Strait of Kerch, which was to be undertaken by a joint force of British and French soldiers and warships.

Taganrog, at the far eastward end of the Sea of Azov, was selected as a potential target for attack. Taganrog is located on a strip of land jutting out slightly into the Sea of Azov and, to the British and the French, formed an excellent stepping stone to Rostov-on-Don. Taking Rostov-on-Don would allow the allies to threaten the rear of the Russian forces.

Plans were drawn up, and the British and French prepared 16,000 ground troops and about forty small warships for the "Azov Campaign". Meanwhile, Taganrog's governor-general, Nikolay Adlerberg, had been replaced by Yegor Tolstoy, an ageing but versatile general, who had served in the Russian Army in fighting against the Turks. In April 1854, Tolstoy assumed command at Taganrog, along with Ivan Krasnov (who commanded the Don Cossacks in the region) and prepared his forces. He had three sotnias of Don Cossacks (No.s 180 Моршанская дружина, 184 Спасская and 188 Борисоглебская) and a local garrison of some 630 soldiers at his command at the time of the siege. A unit of "home guards", totalling 250 men, were recruited from the local population. Taganrog lacked modern fortifications and Tolstoy had no artillery.

== Military operations ==
=== Destruction of the Military Depot ===
Starting on 24 May 1855, the British and the French began operations in the Sea of Azov. They landed troops on either side of the Kerch Strait, quickly capturing the cities of Kerch and Enikale. Following those actions, naval forces destroyed the Russian coastal battery at Kamishevaya Bay and entered the Sea of Azov.

On the evening of 1 June 1855 the Anglo-French squadron, which consisted of 5 paddle steamers and 16 armed launches (on loan from the main allied fleet at Sevastapol) commanded by Captain Edmund Lyons (son of Rear Admiral Edmund Lyons) and Captain Béral de Sedaiges, anchored 8.5 miles of Taganrog in 18 feet of water. On the 2nd HMS Recruit was sent forward to reconnoiter Taganrog and sound the shoals off the town. On the 3rd the Recruit returned and under a flag of truce requested the surrender of the military depot for destruction, the withdrawal of military forces five miles away from the city and the evacuation of the civilian residents. Accompanying the Recruit were the British paddle steamer Danube, the French paddle aviso Mouette, and many small launches from larger ships operating elsewhere. These included 12 British armed steam launches (each with a 24-pounder boat howitzer and/or a rocket launcher), 4 similarly armed French launches, and the raft Lady Nancy. This latter raft occupies an interesting place in the history of naval architecture as Commander Cowper Phipps Coles of HMS Stromboli had erected a protected cupola on her, and placed a 32-pounder within. From this sprang ultimately the modern turret used aboard warships.

The ultimatum was answered by Tolstoy's official for important missions, Baron Yevgeny Pfeilizer-Frank (nephew to former governor Otto Pfeilizer-Frank) and poet Nikolay Sherbina, who later described the event in Moskovskiye Vedomosti on 21 June 1855. The allies demanded the surrender of all government property, the withdrawal of troops and the evacuation of civilians. After an hour of consideration Baron Pfeilizer-Frank returned to the envoys with Tolstoy's reply, rejecting the demands. The Recruit then hauled down her flag of truce and opened fire on the town. The Danube and Mouette, towing the Lady Nancy moved up in the company of the armed launches and joined in the bombardment. A four-oared gig then landed Lt Cecil Buckley and Boatswain Henry Cooper, who proceeded to set fire to the military depots buildings before returning, in the same manner they had at Genitchi on 29 May. The raft Lady Nancy and some of the launches gave close support to the raiding party. Both earned the Victoria Cross for their actions and due to seniority and spelling Buckley was awarded the first VC ever gazetted. All the stores of grain, timber, tar, all the boats in the harbour (including the Russian gunboat Akkerman and various other warships under construction) and any boats under construction, together with the Customs House and the main government buildings were set ablaze.

Tolstoy in his official report claimed the allies had landed a major force near the Old Stone Steps (Каменная лестница) and Greek Church in downtown Taganrog followed the bombardment which was allegedly repulsed by the Cossacks and the volunteer corps.

The allies suffered a single casualty in the operation, Gunner C. Evans of the Royal Marine Artillery was struck in the face by a spent musket ball whilst manning the howitzer of the launch from HMS Princess Royal. Russian losses were significant, including the gunboat Akkerman destroyed in the harbour, and four months food supply for the main Russian army at Sevastapol.

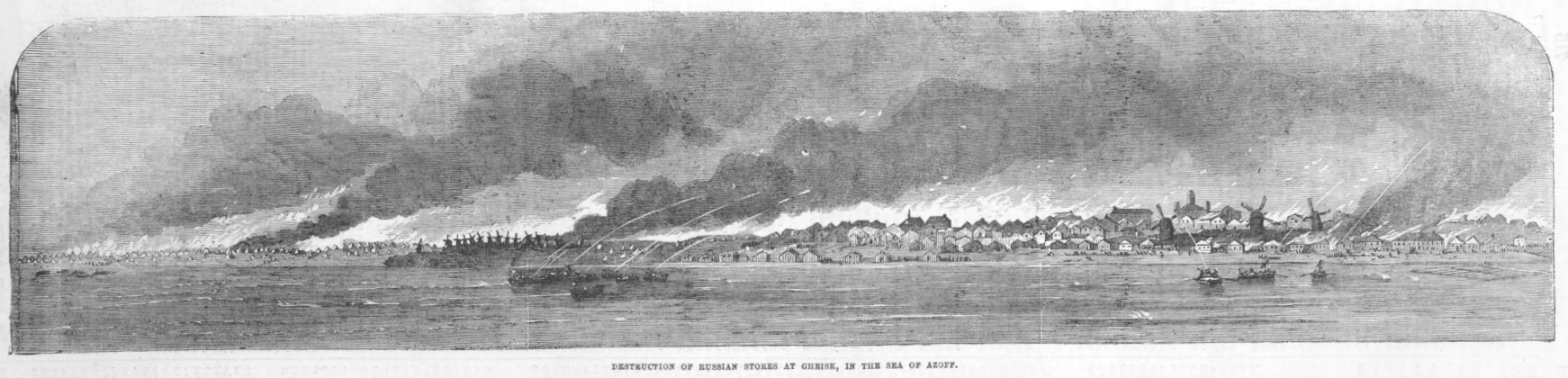
Destruction of Russian stores at Gheisk, in the sea of Azoff, 5 November 1855, Illustrated London News

The allied squadron, having effected their objective, moved off and attacked Mariupol on 5 June and Gheisk on the 5th with similar destructive effects. By mid-June every single coastal town on the Sea of Azov had been attacked and their supplies destroyed to deny them to the main Russian army at Sevastapol.

=== Continuing Operations ===
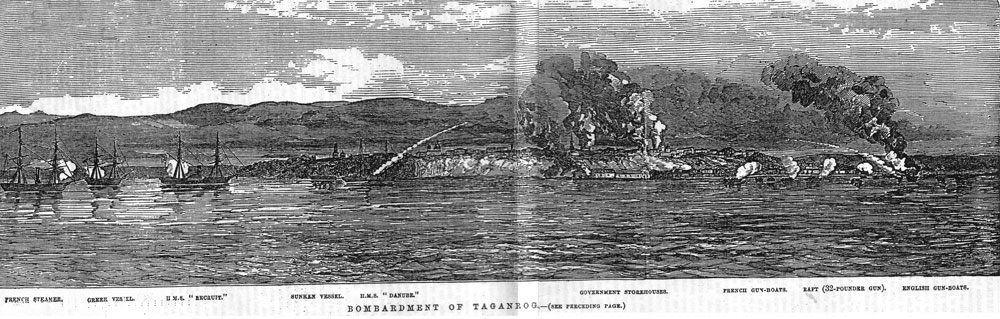
Bombardment of Taganrog on 3 June 1855

After the destruction of their supply bases on the Azov, the Russians deployed another fourteen sotnias of Don Cossacks to the region around the Sea of Azov to protect the various coastal cities. This brought the total number of Cossack sotnias in the area to 16. They attempted to fortify Taganrog and other points. At Taganrog this work consisted of building an earthwork artillery battery. On 19 July, Commander Sherard Osborn conducted a reconnoiter of Taganrog aboard HMS Jasper and observed the battery being built. The Jasper put two shells into the battery but did not receive a response, and so moved off. The Jasper would shortly thereafter become the only allied warship lost in the Sea of Azov campaign when she grounded on Krivaya Spit or "Crooked Spit" near the present-day town of Sedjove in Ukraine, 15 miles west of Taganrog on 23 July. Most sources report that local fishermen moved various buoys that marked water depth, which forced the British warship ashore.

Author Bryan Perret claims instead that she had just destroyed a Russian fortification and had taken the captured guns aboard as prizes. Hence she was running much deeper than normal and grounded. After a day of being unable to free her, and under fire from a force of Cossacks, Jasper's crew was taken off aboard HMS Swallow and the grounded ship scuttled. Don Cossacks subsequently boarded the derelict and captured her two 24-pounder howitzers and 60 shells from her magazine, along with some trophies, like the ship's ensign. The guns were sent to the Cathedral in Taganrog (used as a military base by the Russian Army) and sent onwards to Cherkassk where they were mounted in the coastal defences. The Cossacks eventually blew up the stranded hull. A Royal Navy report said that five days later (29 July) Lieutenant George Lydiard Sulivan (CO of HMS Fancy) dived the wrecked Jasper, recovered her 68-pounder cannon and placed a demolition charge to complete her destruction, as it was found the explosion of her magazine and the shelling of HMS Swallow had left her hull in a salvageable state.

On 5 August 1855 Osborn arrived off Taganrog to destroy the new battery with HMS Vesuvius, HMS Grinder and HMS Wrangler. Driving off the garrison with gunfire the squadron covered a landing party which took control of the battery, took some as prizes, spiked the remaining guns and threw them in the sea, and then blew up the battery before retiring. A few days later the garrison of Taganrog was reinforced further with the Reserve Brigade of the 15th Infantry Division, some 4,000 infantrymen under Major-General Leyna (Лейна), in addition to the large number of Cossacks absorbed by the defence. Patrols continued in the area, and in early September Lt Day's group of HMS Recruit, HMS Curlew and HMS Fancy rode out a storm in Taganrog Roads whilst preparing to strike the Russian force (2 gunboats and 16 barges used as floating batteries) at the mouth of the River Don, but when they approached the Don on 13 September they found the storm had driven off all the Russian defenders. A small raiding party of three from Wrangler, trying to destroy a number of fishing boats at a small lake, was cut off and captured near Mariupol by a group of Cossacks who ambushed them. Patrols continued throughout October and the last patrol of the year reconnoitered Taganrog on 20 November, finding not a single vessel remaining in the harbour. On 24 November Osborn took his remaining ships out of the Sea of Azov as the sea ice started to form, wintering in a warmer climate.

== Conclusion ==
Russian forces at Taganrog stood down on 21 June 1856, and life in the city began to return to normal. The Crimean War cost the city of Taganrog more than one million rubles. Considerable damage was done to local structures. Twenty mansions were completely destroyed, and 74 were damaged to some degree. One hundred and eighty-nine other buildings, primarily granaries and storehouses, were destroyed and 44 damaged. Tsar Alexander II exempted the citizens of Taganrog of having to pay taxes for the year of 1857. 163 Taganrog soldiers were awarded with medals and military orders because of their service during the siege.

== Order of battle ==
The Allied force that attacked Taganrog on 3 June 1855 consisted of:

British:

HMS Recruit – Paddle gunboat with 6 guns (Lt George Fiott Day, with Capt E.M. Lyons)
HMS Danube – Paddle gunboat with boat howitzar and rocket launcher (Lt R.P. Cator)
HMS Lady Nancy – Armed raft with a short 32 pounder on deck in the protected cupola
HMS Sulina – Unarmed paddle tug, Mr. C.H. Williams, acting mate)
HMS Medina – Unarmed steam packet, Lt Comd H.B. Beresford)

12 launches each carrying a single boat howitzer (24 pdr) and a rocket launcher

Launch-1 from HMS Royal Albert (Lt J.D. Curtis)
Launch-2 from HMS Royal Albert (Lt T.M.S. Pasley)
Launch-1 from HMS Hannibal (Mr. A.F. Hurt, acting mate)
Launch-2 from HMS Hannibal (Lt J.H. Crang)
Launch-1 from HMS Algiers (Mr. J.C. Wilson, mate)
Launch-2 from HMS Algiers (Lt F.G.C. Paget)
Launch-1 from HMS Agamemnon (Lt T.L. Gaussen)
Launch-2 from HMS Agamemnon (Lt T.J. Young)
Launch-1 from HMS St. Jean d'Acre (Lt E.W. Turnour)
Launch-2 from HMS St. Jean d'Acre (Lt T.J. Young)
Launch-1 from HMS Princess Royal (Lt John Murray)
Launch-2 from HMS Princess Royal (Lt W.H. Jones)

French:

Mouette – Paddle Aviso with 2 guns (Capitaine de Corvette Lallemand)
Dauphin – Paddle Aviso with 2 guns
Four French launches

The light forces were split into two groups:

One group commanded by Commander Coles
One group commanded by Lt J.F.C. Mackenzie, RMA

== Gallery ==
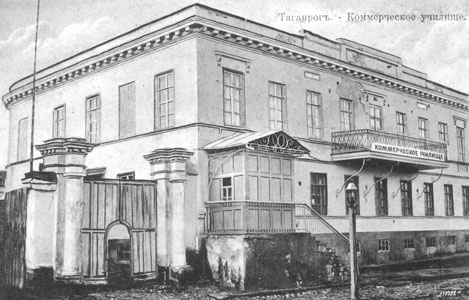
Mansion of Ioannis Varvakis that was known as the House with Bullets as the building was filled with bullets and cannonballs during the siege in 1855

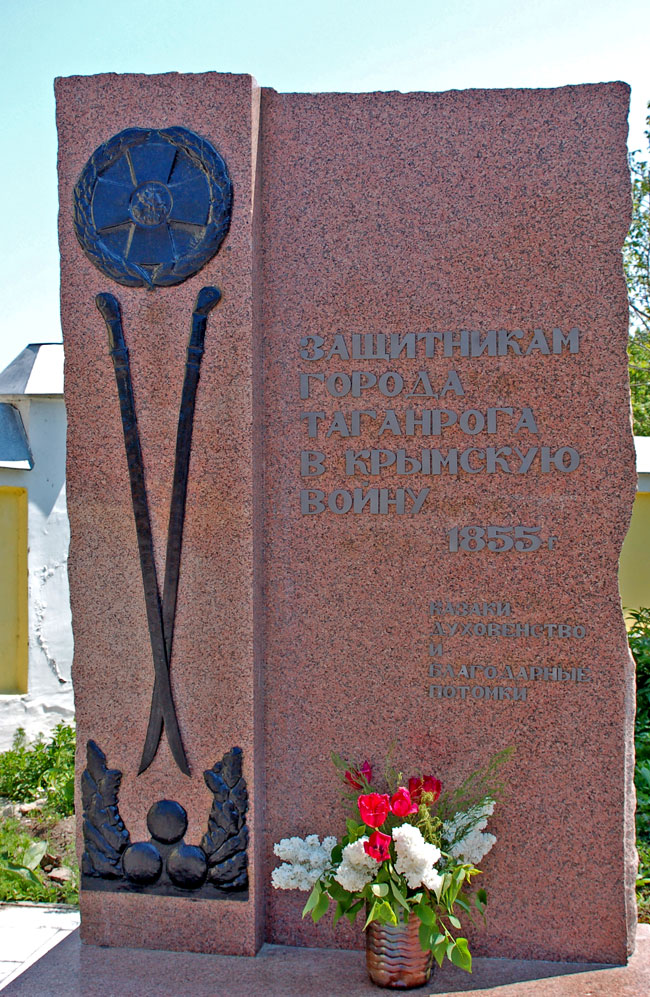
Monument to defenders of Taganrog in 1855.

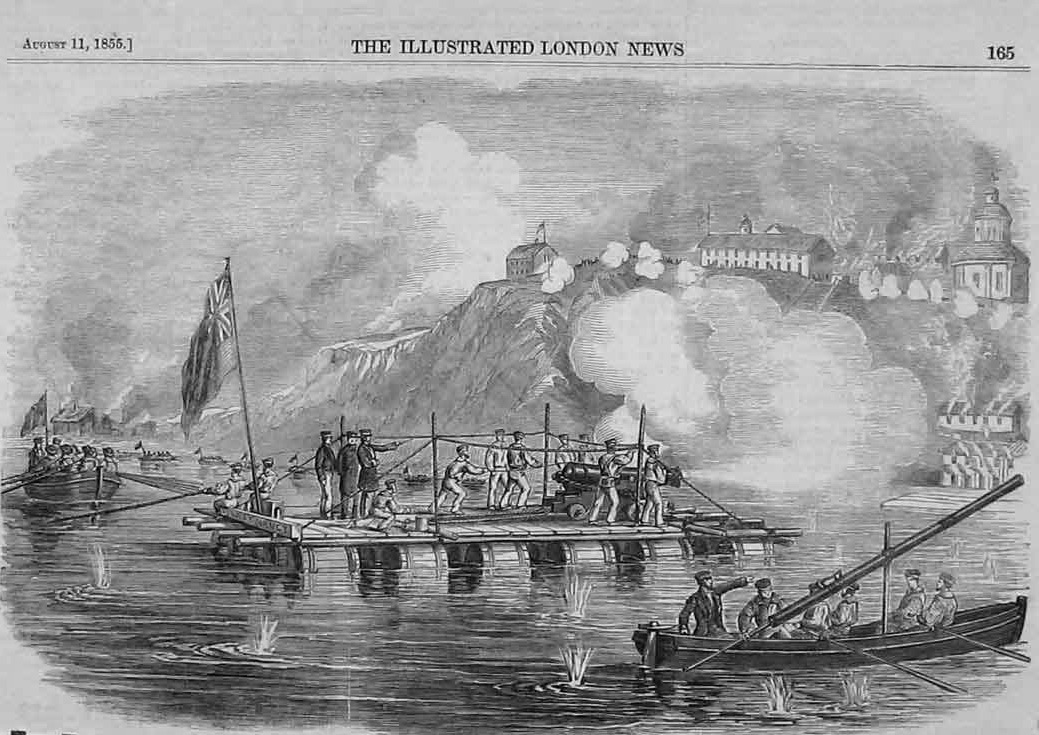
"LADY NANCY" raft covering the raiding party on 3 June 1855

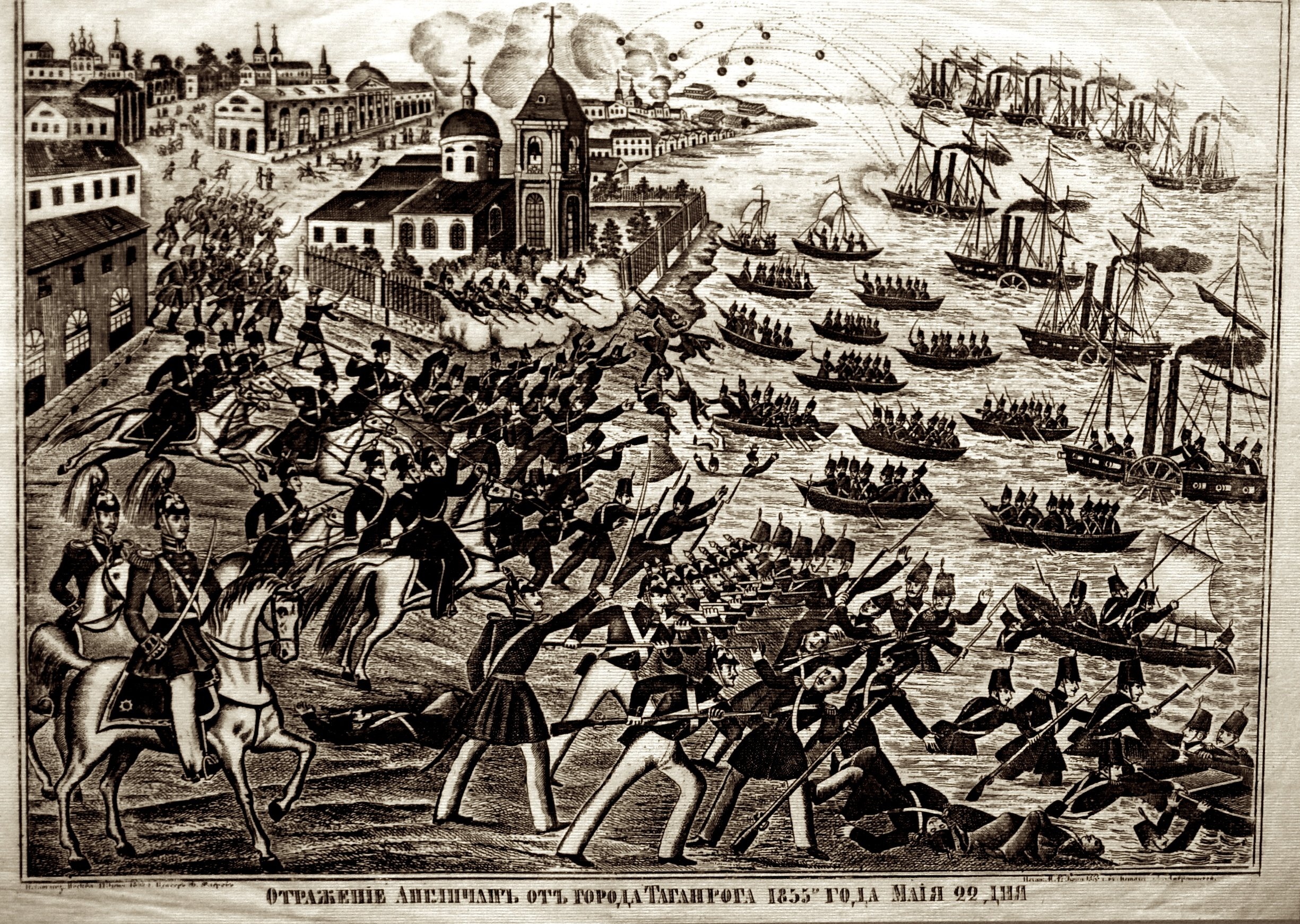
Russian engraving of the bombardment of 3 June

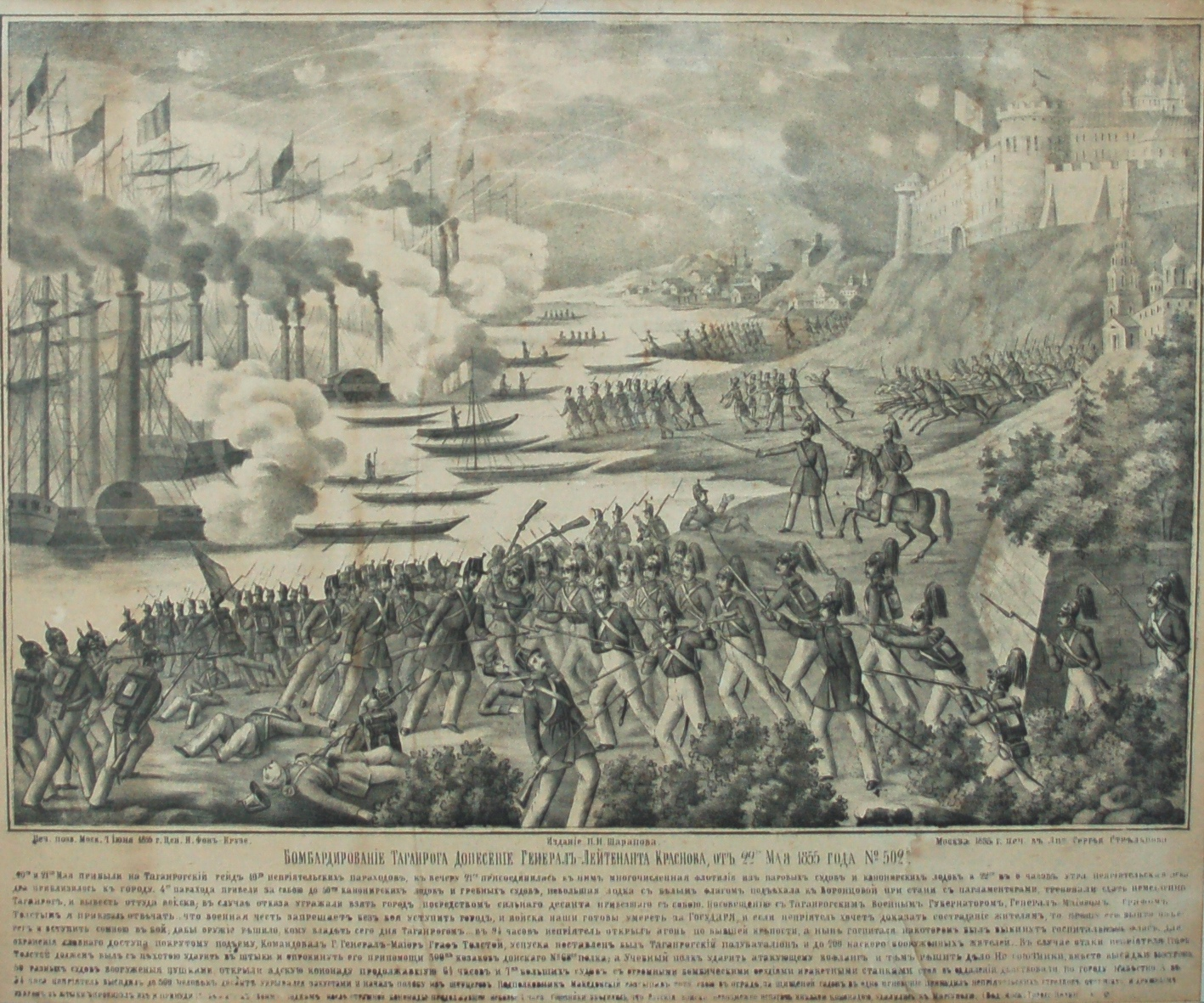
Another Russian engraving of the same incident

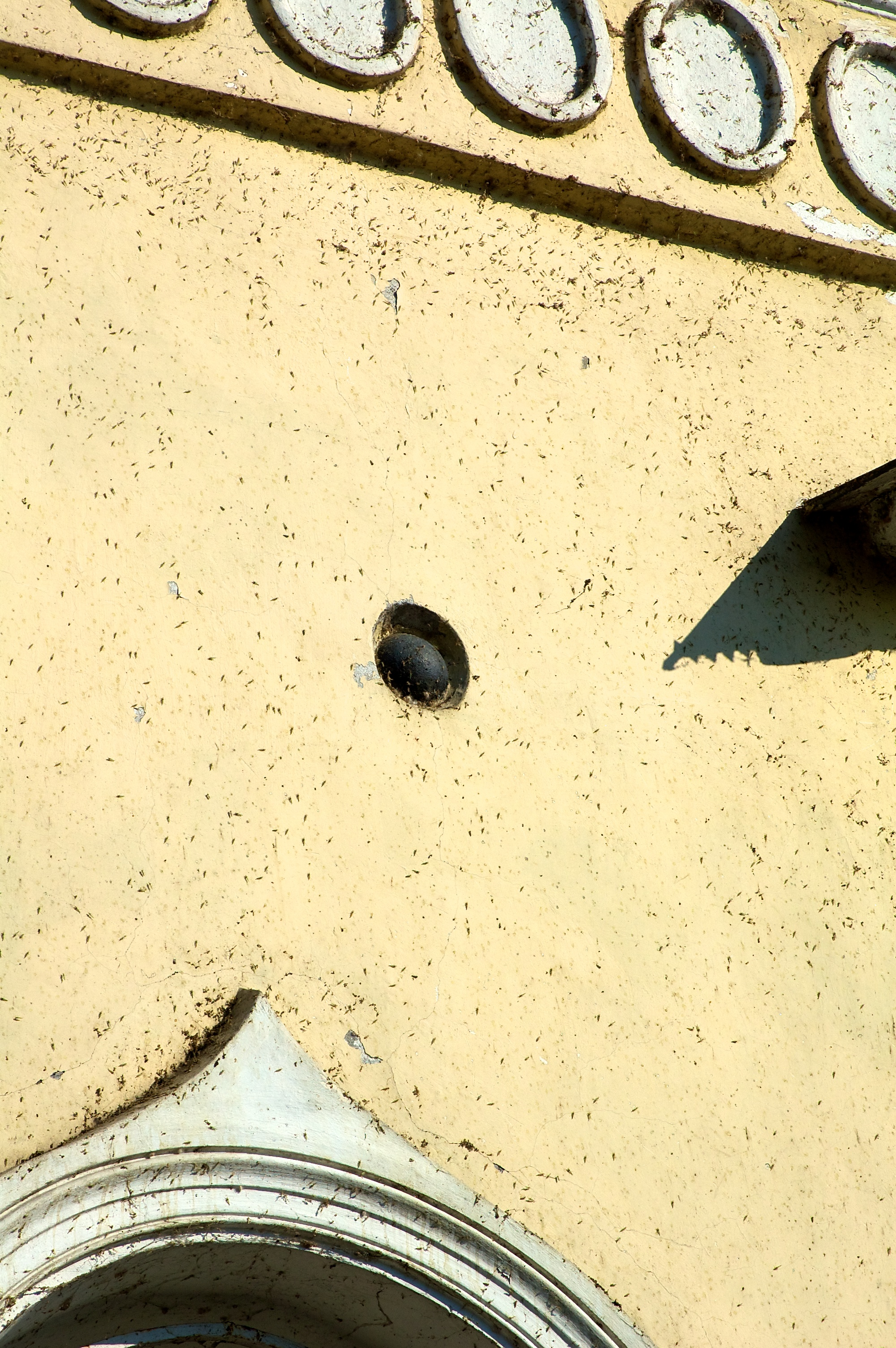
Cannonball in the wall of Saint Nicholas the Wonderworker Church, probably fired 5 August 1855 during the destruction of the battery in the grounds of the church.

== See also ==
- History of Taganrog
- Siege of Sevastopol (1854)

== General references to Tsarist interpretations ==
"Оборона Таганрога и его окрестностей" (Defence of Taganrog and its surroundings) by Ivan Krasnov, Saint Petersburg, 1862
"История Таганрога" (Taganrog Encyclopedia) by П.Филевский (Pavel Filevski), Moscow, 1898
Taganrog Encyclopedia, 2nd edition, Taganrog, 2003, Оборона Приазовья в Крымской войне 1853–1856 гг.
