= Nikolay Krasnov (soldier) =

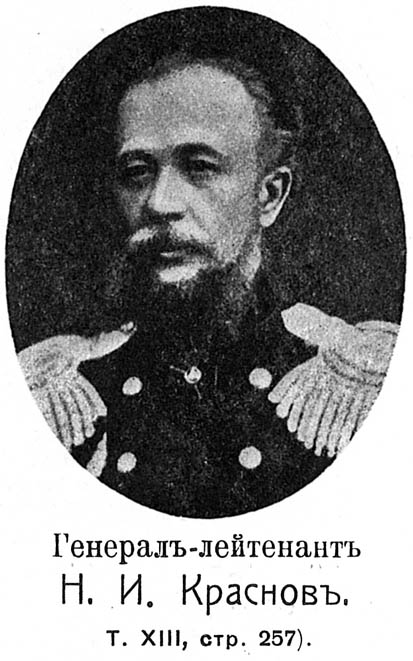
- Born: January 29, 1833; Veshenskaya, Russia
- Died: September 15, 1900 (aged 67); Taganrog, Russia
- Allegiance: Russia
- Branch: Imperial Russian Army
- Rank: Lieutenant general

Nikolay Ivanovich Krasnov (Russian: Краснов, Николай Иванович, 29 January 1833 – 15 September 1900) was a lieutenant general of the Imperial Russian Army.

Nikolay Krasnov was born in the stanitsa Veshenskaya of the Don Host Oblast, the son of lieutenant-general Ivan Krasnov (1800 –1871). He graduated from the 1st Cadets Corps in Saint Petersburg and since 1851 served at the Life Guards of Don Cavalry and Artillery Battery in the rank of praporshik. During Crimean War (1853–1856). In 1855, Krasnov took part in the Siege of Taganrog in the rank of sotnik, while his father, Lieutenant-General Ivan Krasnov, commanded the city's defence. In 1858, he graduated from the Academy of General Headquarters and served at the General Headquarters from 1860 to 1889. In 1863, Krasnov participated in the Polish campaign and was awarded with an Order of St. Anne of the 3rd degree. He was promoted to the rank of major-general in 1880 and gave his resignation in 1891.

Krasnov settled in the city of Taganrog in 1860s and besides his government and military career, published several articles and books on history of Don Cossacks and Don Voisko Province. His best known books are: The Land of the Don Voisko (Земля Войска Донского), published in Saint Petersburg in 1863, and The Military Review of the Land of the Don Voisko (Военное обозрение земли Войска Донского), published in Saint Petersburg in 1864.

General Nikolay Krasnov died in the city of Taganrog on 15 September 1900 and was buried at the Taganrog's Old Cemetery.
