= Henry Cooper (VC) =

Victoria Cross recipient (1825–1893)

Henry Cooper VC
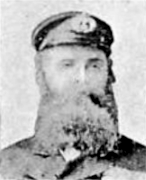
- Born: 1825; Plymouth, Devon, England
- Died: 15 July 1893 (aged 67–68); Torpoint, Cornwall, England
- Burial place: Antony Churchyard, Langdon Cross
- Military career
- Allegiance: United Kingdom
- Branch: Royal Navy
- Rank: Boatswain
- Units: HMS Philomel; HMS Miranda
- Conflicts: Crimean War
- Awards: Victoria Cross

Henry Cooper VC (1825 – 15 July 1893) was an English recipient of the Victoria Cross, the highest and most prestigious award for gallantry in the face of the enemy that can be awarded to British and Commonwealth forces.

He was about 30 years old, and a Boatswain in the Royal Navy during the Crimean War when the following deed took place for which he was awarded the VC.

== Action ==
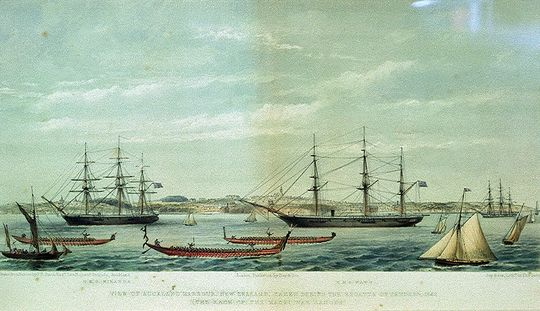
HMS Miranda (left) during the Regatta of January 1862 ("the race of the Maori war canoes")

On 3 June 1855 at Taganrog, Sea of Azov, Crimea, Boatswain Cooper of HMS Miranda together with a lieutenant (Cecil William Buckley) landed while the town was actually under bombardment by the Allied Squadron. It was garrisoned by 3,000 Russian troops, but the two men landed at several places and set fire to government buildings and destroyed enemy equipment and arms. They were under fire themselves for most of the time.

His VC is on display in the Lord Ashcroft Gallery at the Imperial War Museum, London.
