= Sardinian Crimea Medal =

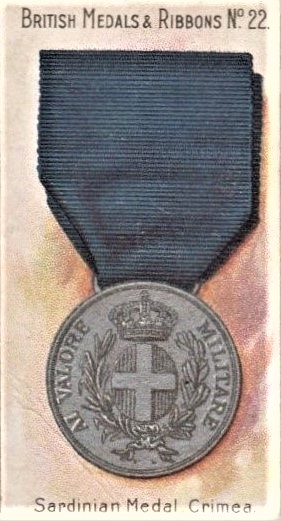
- Obverse of the medal
- Type: Campaign medal
- Presented by: the Kingdom of Sardinia
- Eligibility: British, French and Sardinian personnel
- Campaign: Crimean War
- Established: 6 June 1856

Highlights
- Total recipients: 450 (British recipients)
- Ribbon bar

The Sardinian Crimean War Medal or, more formally, the silver medal for Military Valour for the Eastern Expedition 1855–1856 (Italian: Medaglia d’Argento al Valor Militare per la spedizione d’Oriente 1855–1856) was a gallantry medal awarded by King Victor Emmanuel II of Sardinia for bravery during the Crimean War (1855–1856) against the Russian Empire. It is a variant of the Sardinian Medal of Military Valor.

== Ribbon and medal ==
A silver medal with a blue watered ribbon. The obverse shows a crown with laurel and palm branch surrounding the arms of Savoy, with the inscription "Al Valore Militare". The reverse is inscribed "Spedizione d'Oriente 1854–1856" outside a laurel wreath, with the name, rank and unit of the recipient usually engraved within the wreath.

In addition to awards to the Sardinian Expeditionary Corps and other allied soldiers, the medal was awarded to 450 specially selected officers and men of the Royal Navy and British Army. Queen Victoria gave permission for the medal to be worn by British servicemen in uniform.

== See also ==
- British Crimean War Medal
- Turkish Order of the Medjidie
- Turkish Crimea Medal
- Baltic Medal
- Légion d'honneur
- Médaille militaire
