= Turkish Crimea Medal =

Turkish medal for service in the Crimean War

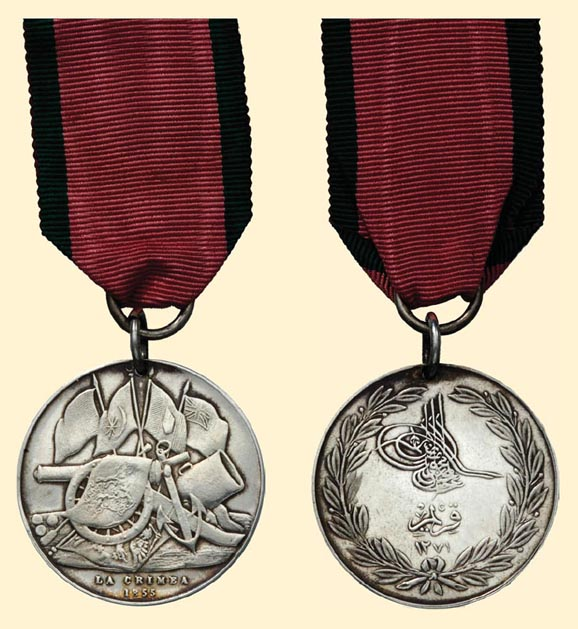
- Turkish Crimean War Medal reverse (left) and obverse, Sardinian issue
- Type: Campaign medal
- Description: Silver disc, 36mm in diameter
- Eligibility: British, French, and Sardinian personnel
- Campaign: Crimean War
- Established: 1856
- Ribbon bar of the medal

The Turkish Crimean War Medal (Turkish: Kırım Harbi Madalyası) is a campaign medal issued by Sultan Abdulmejid I of the Ottoman Empire to allied military personnel involved in the Crimean War of 1854–56. It was only awarded to those who survived the war and not to next of kin. There are three different issues of this medal for British, French, or Sardinian personnel. The medal was designed by James Robertson.

British recipients also qualified for the British Crimea Medal.

== Design and identification ==
The medal is silver and 1.4 inches (36 mm) in diameter.

The obverse shows the Ottoman Sultan’s tughra with the Muslim calendar year of 1271 on all versions.

The reverse depicts a cannon standing upon the Imperial Russian flag, with an anchor and a mortar. The four flags of the allies are to the rear, their order identifying the country for which the medal was intended, either Great Britain, France or Sardinia. The identifying flag is the central right hand flag, positioned above the anchor, the Union Flag for Great Britain, the tricolour for France or the flag of the Kingdom of Sardinia, based on the Italian tricolore. Since Sardinia was ruled at the time by the House of Savoy, this flag has the Savoy shield in the central panel. The Turkish flag is placed centre left on all three versions. The inscription in the exergue reads "Crimea 1855" for British issue, "La Crimee 1855" for French issue, and "La Crimea 1855" for Sardinian issue.

Due to the loss by shipwreck of 22,000 of the medals intended for British recipients, many awards were made with whatever issue came to hand, the most common being of the Sardinian type.

Over the years many have mistakenly believed the flags and cannon to be the obverse of this medal, and many of the recipients wore it that way. The side with the Sultan's cypher or tughra is the correct obverse, although most collectors today continue to mount the medal with the flags and cannon as the obverse.

The general quality of these medals was poor and some British officers had copies of superior quality made in 925 silver with plain or scroll suspenders. These have clearer detail and are generally thicker and heavier; they are often seen in groups mounted by Messrs. Hunt and Roskill. The British versions of this medal are also generally believed to have a slightly higher silver content than the French or Sardinian versions.

=== Ribbon ===
The ribbon is watered and of dark crimson with green edges. The original ribbon issued with this medal measured only .5 inches (13 mm) wide (similar to a miniature medal ribbon) and often used two widths, but it was usually replaced by one of 1.25 inches (32 mm) when awarded to British personnel. The medal was originally suspended via two small steel rings, although the one on the medal itself can be silver. Not only did they tend to rust, but these rings were almost universally altered to take the wider ribbon conforming to standard British type. Other suspensions were also used and therefore many medals are found with a privately attached scroll or other suspender akin to British medal types.

=== Naming ===
This medal was issued unnamed but examples are found with privately engraved naming of varying styles.

== Criteria and numbers awarded ==
While the Sultan offered the medal to Turkey's three allies, it was left to each country to decide how many to accept and the criteria of award.

The United Kingdom awarded 74,000 medals for all ranks of the Army who qualified for the British Crimea Medal and who had survived the war; with a further 25,000 for the Royal Navy. Queen Victoria gave permission for the medal to be worn in uniform.

France ordered only 1,500 medals for award to French troops who had served in Turkey. The French commander in the Crimea, Marshal Pélissier, described the medals as poorly made and of “little attraction”. There was no Imperial Decree permitting its wear in uniform, in contrast to the British Crimea and Baltic Medals, both of which were authorised by Imperial Decree for wear by French recipients.

Sardinia accepted 5,000 Turkish medals, which were awarded to selected officers and men of their forces who distinguished themselves in the campaign.

As many British recipients were finally issued with the medal designed for Sardinian – and sometimes French – troops, the number received by each country does not indicate the number awarded of each design.

== See also ==
- British Crimean War Medal
- Turkish Order of the Medjidie
- Sardinian Crimea Medal
- Baltic Medal
- Légion d'honneur
- Médaille militaire

== References and further reading ==
- Joslin, Litherland and Simpkin, British Battles and Medals. Published by Spink, London. 1988. ISBN 978-0-907605-256.
- David M. Goldfrank, The Origins of the Crimean War. Published by Routledge. 1993. ISBN 0582490553.
- Winfried Baumbart, The Crimean War, 1853-1856. Published by Bloomsbury Academic. 2020. ISBN 1350083437.
- Guy Arnold (Editor), John Worronoff (Editor), Historical Dictionary of the Crimean War. Published by Scarecrow Press. 2002. ISBN 9780810842762.
- Ulrich Keller, Ultimate Spectacle: A Visual History of the Crimean War. Published by Routledge. 2002. ISBN 9057005697.
- George Frederick Dallas, Michael Hargreave Mawson (Editors), Eyewitness in the Crimea : The Crimean War Letters of Lt. Col. George Frederick Dallas. Published by Greenhill Books. 2001. ISBN 1853674508.
- ERMAN, M.Demir, (2023) Osmanlı-Türk Madalya ve Nişanları 1801-1923 The Ottoman-Turkish Medals and Orders- ISBN 978-605-87186-0-9
