= Crimea Medal =

British campaign medal

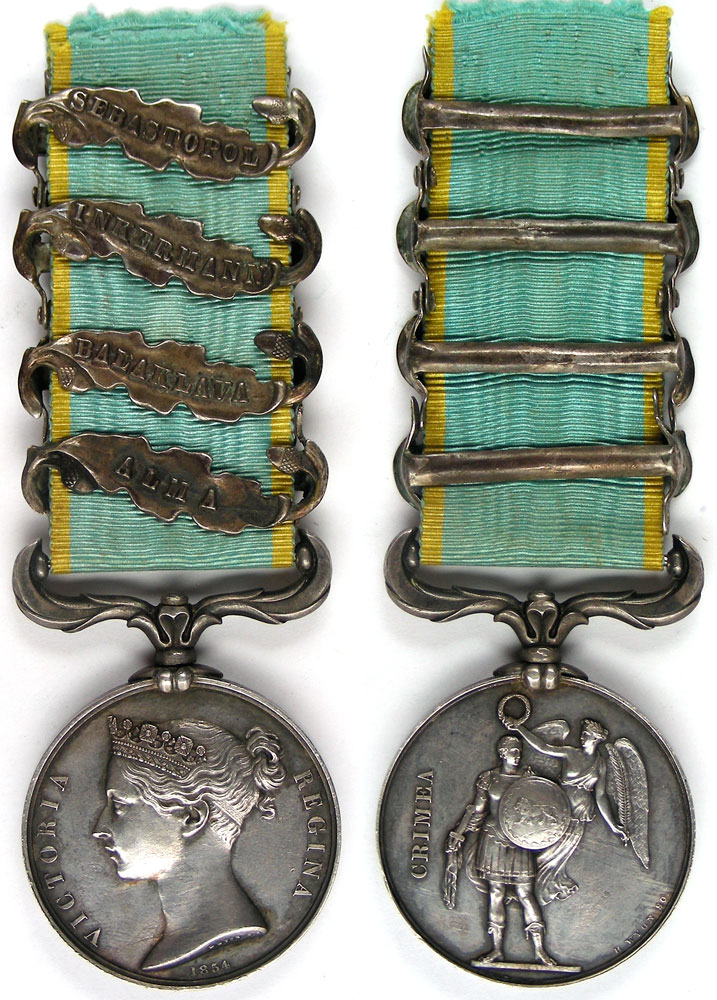
- Obverse and reverse of the medal.
- Type: Campaign medal
- Awarded for: Campaign service.
- Description: Silver disc, 36mm diameter.
- Presented by: United Kingdom of Great Britain and Ireland
- Eligibility: British forces.
- Campaign: Crimean War.
- Clasps: Alma; Inkerman; Balaklava; Sebastopol; Azoff
- Established: 15 December 1854
- Total: 275,000
- Ribbon: 27mm, pale blue with yellow edges.
- Related: Turkish Crimea Medal; Baltic Medal

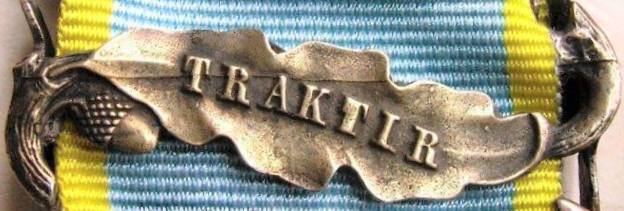
Crimea Medal with unofficial French bar Traktir

The Crimea Medal was a campaign medal approved on 15 December 1854, for issue to officers and men of British units (land and naval) which fought in the Crimean War of 1854–1856 against Russia. The medal was awarded with the British version of the Turkish Crimea Medal, but when a consignment of these was lost at sea, some troops received the Sardinian version.

== Design ==
The medal consists of a 36 millimetres (1.4 in) silver disc with, on the obverse, the diademed head of Queen Victoria and the legend VICTORIA REGINA with the date 1854 below. The reverse has a depiction of a standing Roman warrior about to receive a laurel crown from a flying figure of victory, the word CRIMEA appearing on the left.
The medal is notable for its unusually ornate clasps. Each is in the form of an oak leaf with an acorn at each end, a style not used on any other British medal. The ornate, floriated, swivelling suspender is also unique to the Crimea Medal.
The 27 millimetres (1.1 in) wide ribbon is pale blue with yellow edges.

Most medals were issued unnamed, but could be returned for naming free of charge – impressed on the rim in block Roman capitals, in the same style as the Military General Service Medal – while some recipients had their medals privately engraved.

== Clasps and eligibility ==
Five clasps were authorised:

- Alma – for the battle of 20 September 1854.
- Balaklava – for the battle of 25 October 1854.
- Inkerman – for the battle of 5 November 1854.
- Sebastopol – for the siege that lasted from 11 September 1854 to 9 September 1855.
  Anyone who received the Balaklava or Inkerman clasps was also awarded this clasp.
- Azoff – for the Naval expedition in the Sea of Azoff from 25 May to 22 September 1855. It was awarded only to Royal Navy personnel.

The Alma and Inkerman clasps were authorised in December 1854 at the same time as the medal, with that for Balaklava on 23 February 1855, Sebastopol on 13 October 1855 and Azoff on 2 May 1856.Azoff. No person received more than four clasps.

The medal was awarded to the next of kin of those who died during the campaign.

Troops who landed in the Crimea after 9 September 1855, the day Sebastopol fell, did not receive the medal unless they had been engaged against the enemy after that date.

The medal was issued to Turkish, and to a limited number of French forces who served in the Crimea, unofficial French clasps being sometimes added in addition to the British clasps, including:

- Tchernaia – for the battle of August 16, 1855.
- Traktir – alternate clasp for the bars the Battle of the Tchernaia.
- Mer d'Azoff – for the Navy missions in the Sea of Azoff from 25 May to 22 November 1855.
- Malakof – for the battle of 8 September 1855.

== Influences ==
The unique design has influenced other medals.

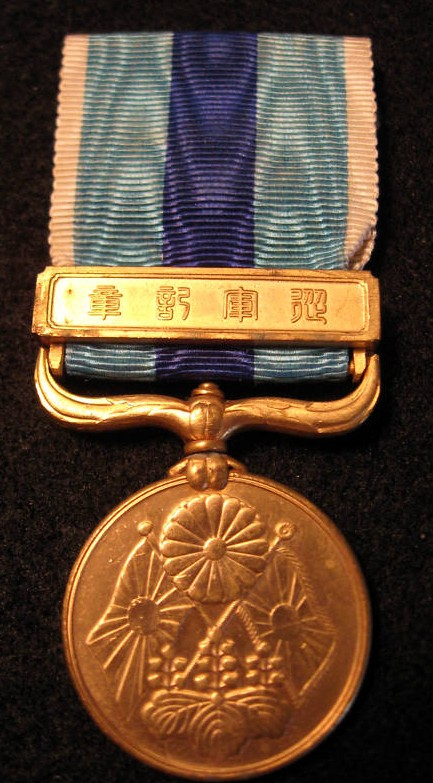
1904-05 Russo-Japanese War Medal, based on Crimea Medal

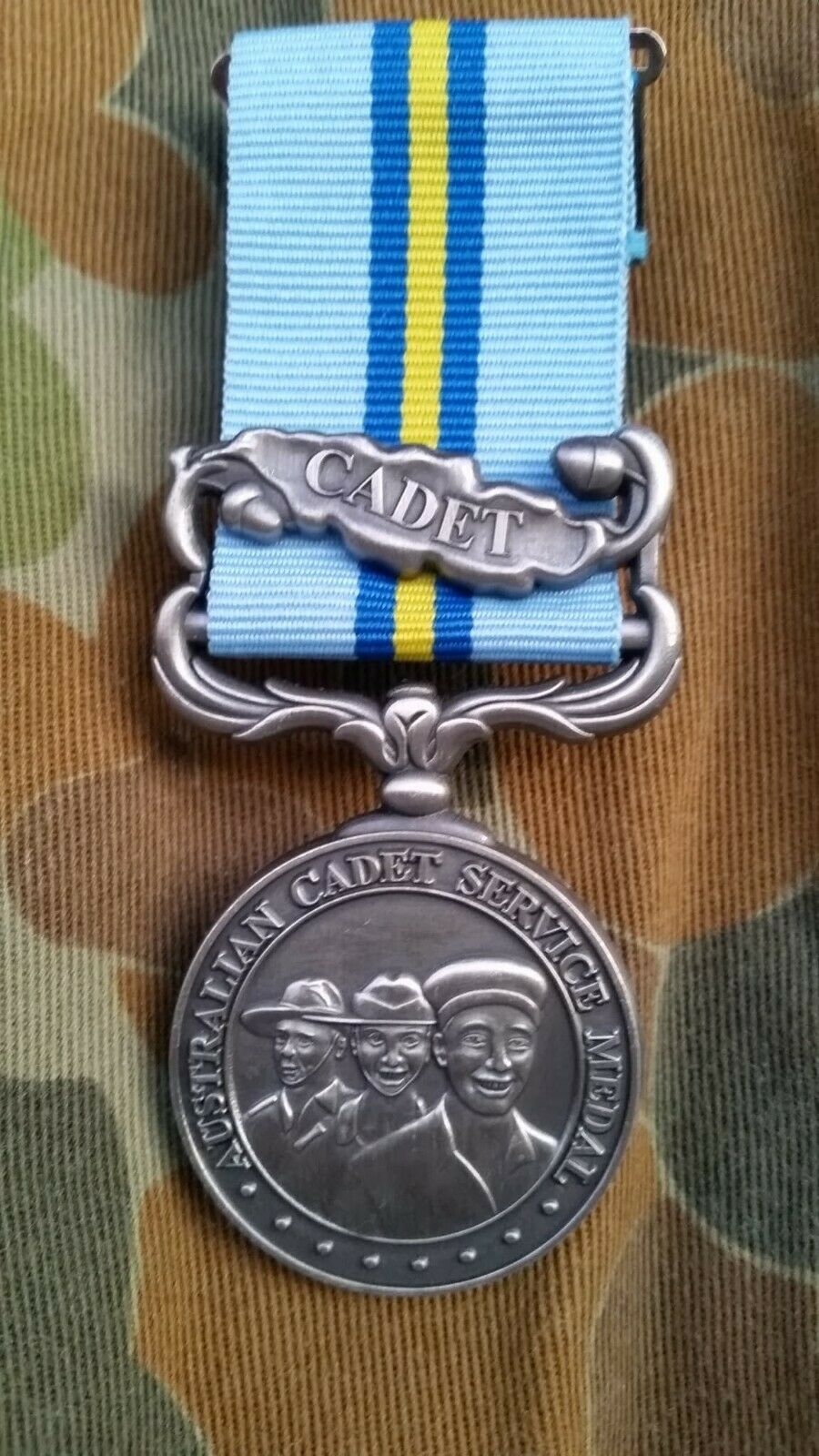
Australian Cadet Service Medal, designed by Benjamin Bishop

The suspender and the clasp of the Crimea Medal inspired the 2020 design of the unofficial Australian Cadet Service Medal awarded to Australian Defence Force cadets (ADFC) for service to communities.

This suspension bar design of many Japanese military medals during the late 1800s to mid 1900s was closely based on the Crimea Medal. The medals using this design include:

- 1874 Formosa Expedition War Medal
- Medal of Honor
- 1904-05 Russo-Japanese War Medal
- 1937-45 Japanese Army China Incident War Medal
- 1931–34 China Incident War Medal
- Japanese Service Medals
- Taisho Enthronement Commemorative Medal 1915

== See also ==
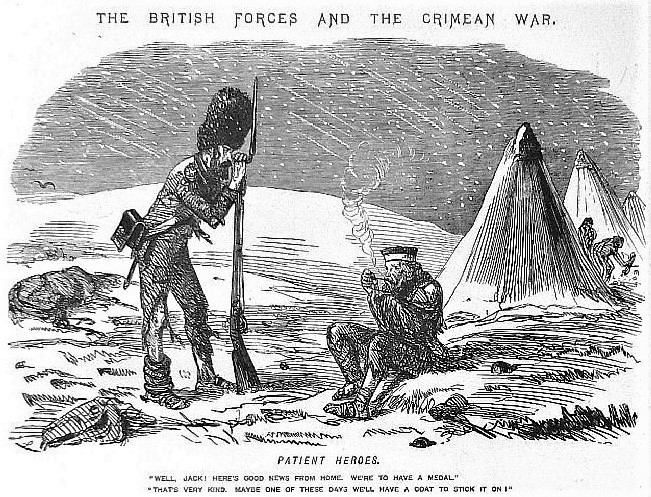
Cartoon from Punch magazine titled Patient Heroes. The caption reads: Well Jack! Here's good news from home. We are going to have a medal. That’s very kind. Maybe one of these days we'll have a coat to stick it on! In December 1854, when the medal was sanctioned, there was widespread criticism in Britain that the troops were not receiving winter supplies, including warm clothing.

- Category:Recipients of the Crimea Medal
- Baltic Medal
- Turkish Crimean War medal
- Turkish Order of the Medjidie
- Sardinian Crimea Medal
- Légion d'honneur
- Médaille militaire
- Crimean War medal (disambiguation)

== Bibliography ==
- Mussell, J, ed. (2014). Medals Yearbook 2015. Token Publishing. ISBN 978-0950694313.
- Joslin; Litherland; Simpkin, eds. (1988). British Battles and Medals. London: Spink. ISBN 978-0-907605-256.
- Steward, William Augustus (1915). War Medals and Their History. London: Stanley Paul & Co.
- Dorling, Captain H. Taprell (1956). Ribbons and Medals. London: A.H.Baldwin & Sons.
