= Ivan Krasnov =

Russian general (1802–1871)

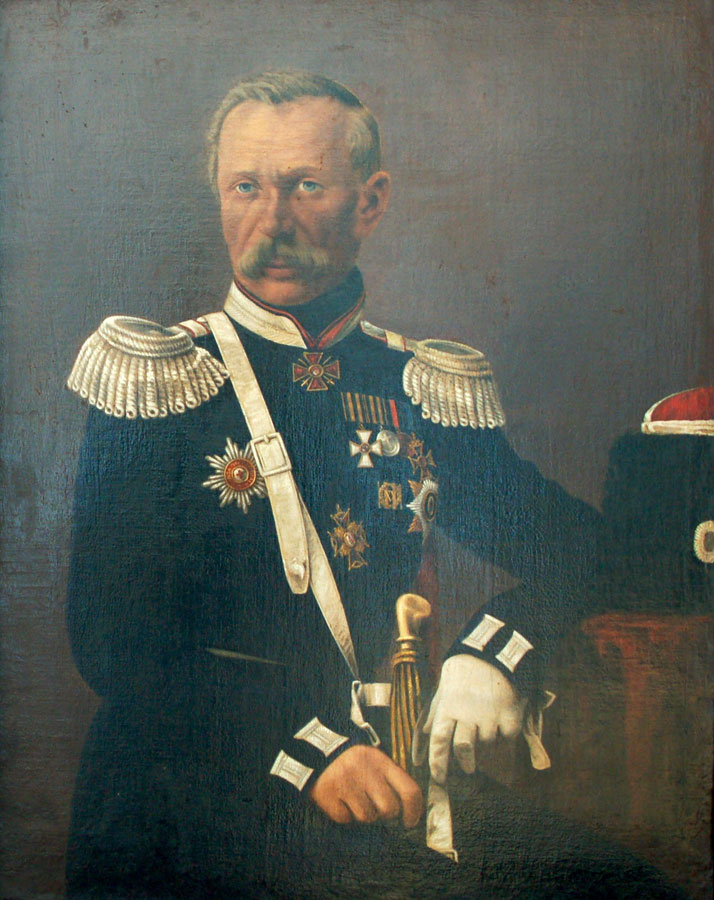
- Ivan Krasnov, portrait from Alferaki Palace
- Born: 1802; Russian Empire
- Died: 14 April 1871 (aged 68–69); Russian Empire
- Military career
- Allegiance: Russian Empire
- Branch: Imperial Russian Army
- Service years: 1816–1871
- Rank: Lieutenant general
- Conflicts: Russo-Turkish War; November Uprising; Caucasian War; Crimean War
- Awards: Order of St. George

Ivan Ivanovich Krasnov Russian: Краснов, Иван Иванович (1802–1871) was a Russian general and author.

== Military career ==
He was born in 1802, grandson to the general Ivan Kuzmich Krasnov (1752–1812), fellow-fighter of Alexander Suvorov and Matvey Platov. Ivan Ivanovich Krasnov was educated at the boarding-school by Kharkov University. He began military service in 1816 at the Life Guards of the Cossacks Regiment. Three years later, he was promoted to the rank of aide-de-camp to Vasily Orlov-Denisov, commander of the 2nd Cavalry Corps. He participated at the Russo-Turkish War, 1828–1829, and subdued the Polish rebels during the November Uprising in 1831. Afterwards, he returned home to the Don Voisko Province.

In 1838, Ivan Krasnov was elected the director of the board of the Don Cossack Voisko and assistant to the Ataman for civil affairs. In 1841–1842 he served as Cossack field chieftain of Don Cossack Voisko regiments in the Caucasus and wrote the book Notes on the War in Caucasus (Записки о кавказской войне). In 1843–1848 he commanded the Life Guards of the Cossacks regiment. During Crimean War Krasnov served in the rank of field chieftain (ataman) of Don Cossack Voisko regiments within the Crimean Army, and organized the defense of the city of Taganrog during the Siege of Taganrog in 1855. In 1856 he was appointed general of the 4th military district of Don Voisko.

== Literary activity ==
After the end of Crimean War, Ivan Ivanovich Krasnov returned to his social activities. He regularly published several articles in Don Voisko News (Донские Войсковые Ведомости), Military Review (Военный сборник) and other periodicals. His most important articles dedicated to Don Voisko are:

- On the Service of Don Cossacks (О донской казачьей службе) published in Military Review (Военный сборник) 1858 number 2
- Don Cossacks Up-River and in the Lower Don (Низовые и верховые донские казаки) published in Military Review (Военный сборник) 1858 number 2
- Ukrainian on the Don, Parties on the Don, On the Service of Cossacks, Don People on Caucasus in Military Review (Военный сборник) 1861 number 9
- Defense of Taganrog and Azov Sea Coast in 1855 (Saint Petersburg, 1862);
- Nationalities within the Don Cossack Voisko and Local patriotism in the Don Cossack Voisko in Modern Chronicle (Современная летопись), 1865 number 16
- In Response to the Proposal on Formation of Cossack Regiments in Military Review (Военный сборник) 1865 number 11.

The most interesting work in terms of historical importance would be his Notes of the War in Caucasus, providing materials on the history of the Life Guards of the Cossack regiment. Ivan I. Krasnov started his literary activity with poems, such as Quiet Flows the Don, Prince Vasil'ko and more.

== See also ==
- Nikolay Krasnov
- Siege of Taganrog

== External links and references ==
- Taganrog Encyclopaedia, Taganrog, 2002
- History of Taganrog by Pavel Filevsky, Moscow, 1898
