= Sea of Azov naval campaign (1855) =

1855 naval campaign of the Crimean War

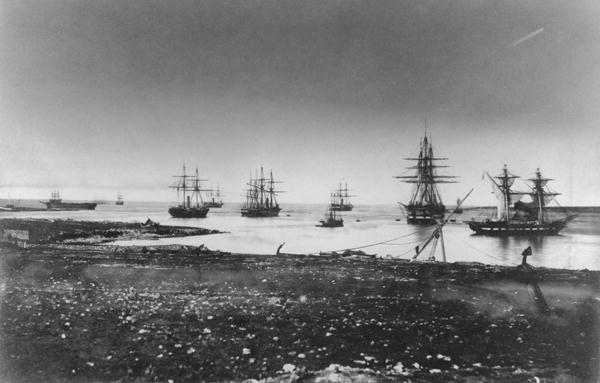
The French squadron during the Crimean War

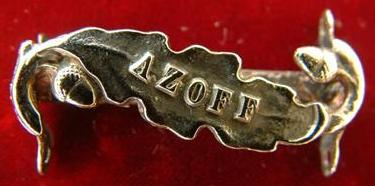
The 'Azoff' bar from the British Crimean War Medal

During the Crimean War (1853–1856), a naval campaign was fought in the Sea of Azov between the Royal Navy and the French Navy against the Russian Navy between 25 May–22 November 1855. British and French warships struck at every vestige of Russian power along the coast of the Sea of Azov. Except for Rostov-on-Don and Azov, no town, depot, building or fortification was immune from attack. Contrary to established images of the Russian War, here was a campaign which was well-planned, dynamically led and overwhelmingly successful. The British authorities, significantly, issued the bar "Azoff" to the British Crimean War Medal, thus acknowledging the services of those who waged the most successful operations against the Russians during the war of 1854–1856. The bar was awarded only to the Royal Navy, together with units of the Royal Marines present during the campaign. The unauthorised French clasp, reading Mer d'Azoff , was worn by sailors of the French Navy.
