= Baltic Medal =

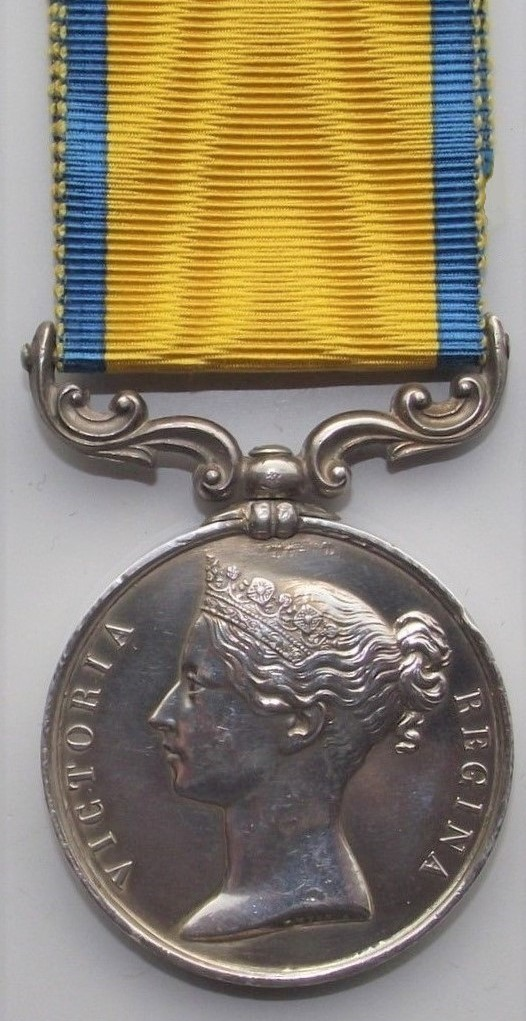
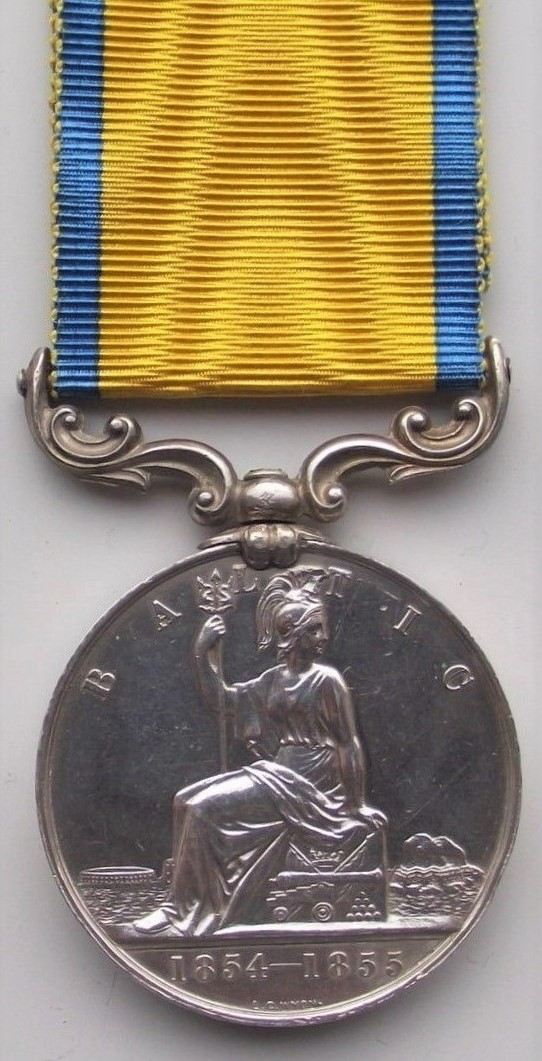
- Obverse and reverse of the medal.
- Type: Campaign medal
- Awarded for: Campaign service.
- Description: Silver disk, 36mm diameter.
- Presented by: United Kingdom of Great Britain and Ireland
- Eligibility: Royal Navy, Royal Marines, Royal Sappers and Miners.
- Campaign(s): Baltic Sea 1854-55.
- Clasps: None authorised.
- Established: 6 June 1856
- Ribbon bar.

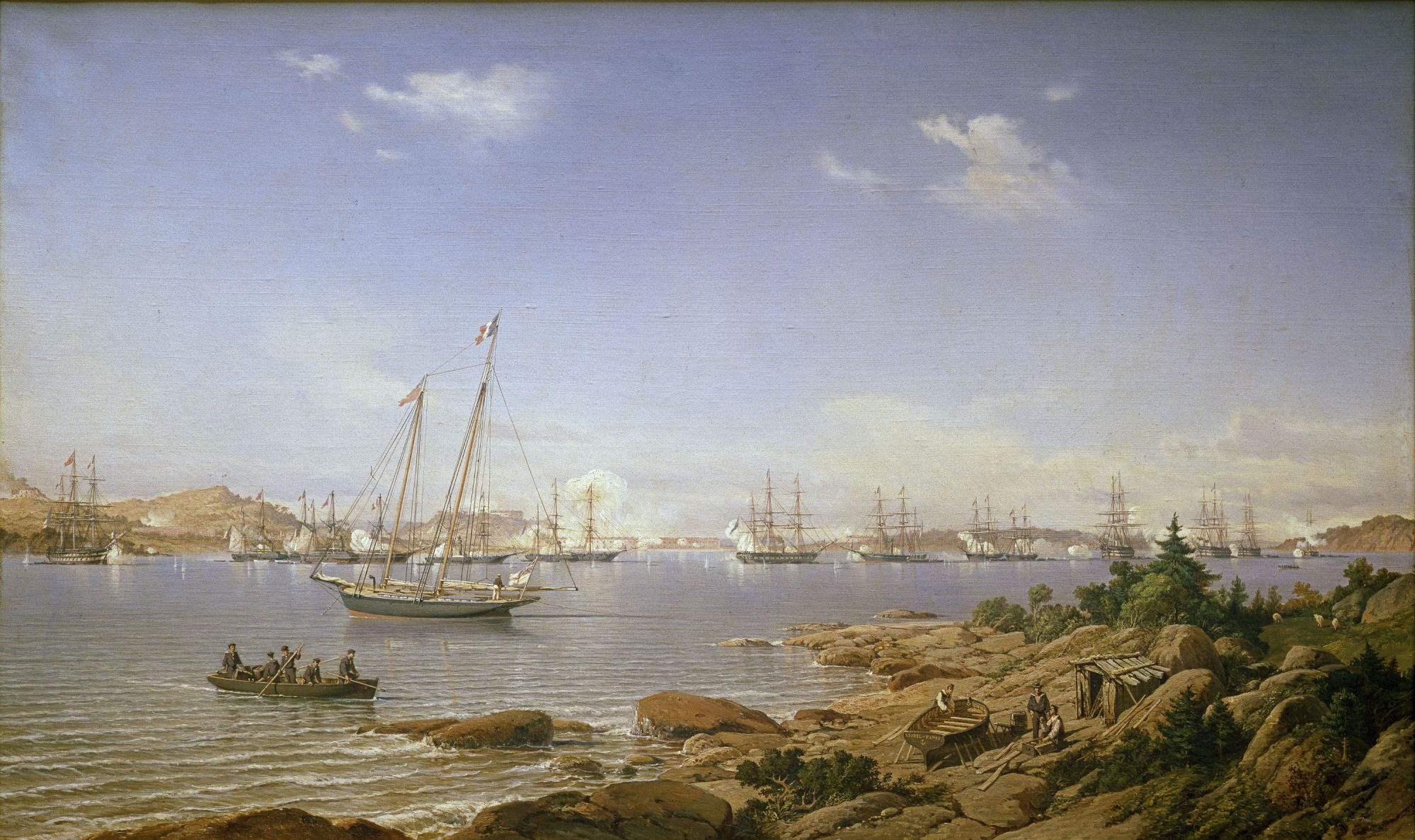
The battle of Bomarsund

The Baltic Medal was a campaign medal approved on 6 June 1856, for issue to officers and men of the Royal Navy, Royal Marines, and Royal Sappers and Miners who served between March 1854 and August 1855 in the Baltic Sea operations against Russia in the Baltic theatre of the Crimean War, or Åland War. The medal primarily covered naval actions but was also awarded to 106 men of the Royal Sappers and Miners who were landed to place demolition charges against Russian fortifications at Bomarsund and Sveaborg.

== Description ==
- A circular silver medal, 36 millimetres (1.4 in) in diameter.
- Obverse: The diademed head of Queen Victoria with the legend VICTORIA REGINA, designed by William Wyon.
- Reverse: A seated figure of Britannia holding a trident with the fortresses at Bomarsund and Sveaborg behind. Above is the word BALTIC and below the dates 1854-1855. Designed by Leonard Charles Wyon.
- Clasps: None were authorised.
- Ribbon: The 31.7 millimetres (1.25 in) wide ribbon is yellow with light blue edges, reversing the colours of the Crimea Medal ribbon.
- Naming: Issued unnamed, except for the 106 medals awarded to Royal Sappers and Miners, which had the recipient's name and unit impressed on the rim of the medal in block Roman capitals. Some naval recipients had their medals privately engraved.

Officers and men who were eligible for the medal were required to apply to the Accountant-General of the Navy. In 1858 the Admiralty announced that officers who served as agents for transports would be eligible.

== Bibliography ==
- John Horsley Mayo (1897). "Medals and Decorations of the British Army and Navy, Volume 2". A. Constable & Co.
- Mussel, J (ed) - Medal Yearbook - 2015, (2014), Token Publishing.
- Joslin, Litherland, and Simpkin (eds), British Battles and Medals, (1988), Spink
- Fred Larimore (2003). "The Baltic Medal 1854-1855". Archived from the original on 2009-09-14.
