= War crimes in the Russo-Ukrainian war (2022–present) =

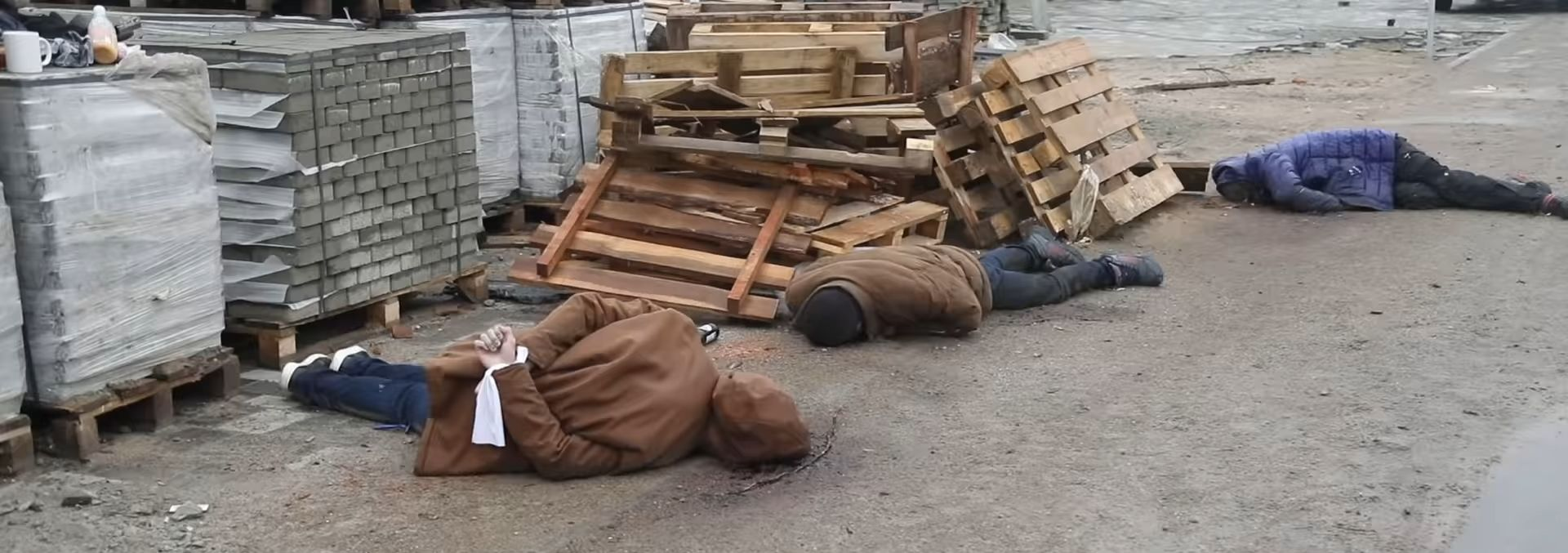
Bodies of civilians shot by Russian soldiers lie on a street in Bucha, 3 April 2022. The hands of one victim are tied behind his back.

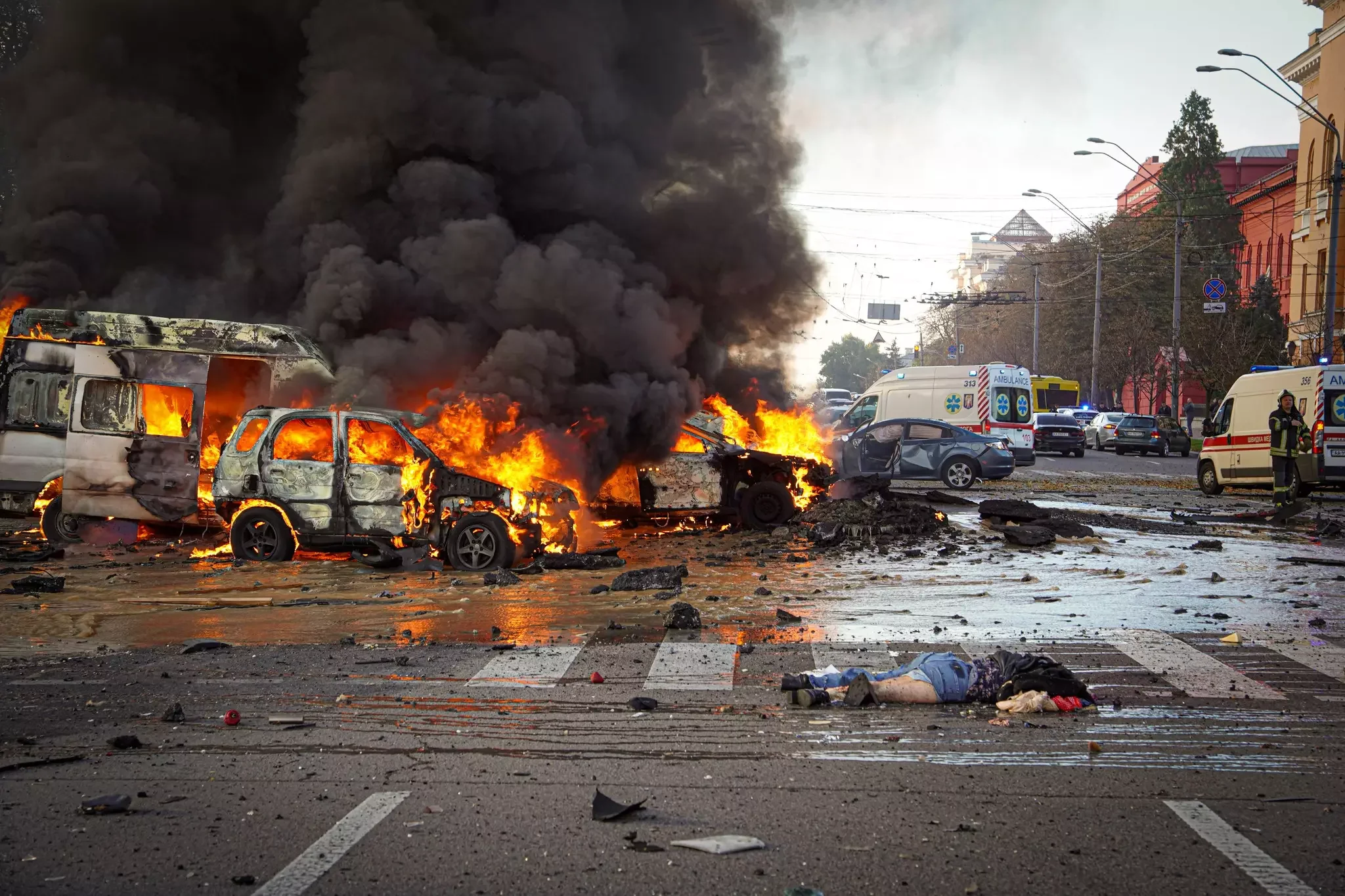
Civilians killed and cars destroyed in Russian missile strikes on Kyiv, 10 October 2022

During the Russo-Ukrainian war (2022–present) starting with the 2022 Russian invasion of Ukraine, the Russian military and authorities have committed war crimes, such as deliberate attacks against civilian targets, including on hospitals, medical facilities and on the energy grid; indiscriminate attacks on densely populated areas; the abduction, torture and murder of civilians; forced deportations; sexual violence; destruction of cultural heritage; and the killing and torture of Ukrainian prisoners of war.

On 2 March 2023, the prosecutor of the International Criminal Court (ICC) opened a full investigation into past and present allegations of war crimes, crimes against humanity, or genocide committed in Ukraine by any person from 21 November 2013 onwards, set up an online method for people with evidence to initiate contact with investigators, and sent a team of investigators, lawyers, and other professionals to Ukraine to begin collecting evidence. Two other independent international agencies are also investigating violations of human rights and of international humanitarian law in the area: the Independent International Commission of Inquiry on Ukraine, established by the United Nations Human Rights Council on 4 March 2022, and the UN Human Rights Monitoring Mission in Ukraine, deployed by Office of the United Nations High Commissioner for Human Rights. The latter started monitoring human rights violations by all parties in 2014 and employs nearly 60 UN human rights monitors. On 7 April 2022, the United Nations suspended Russia from the UN Human Rights Council. By late October, the Ukrainian Prosecutor's office had documented 39,347 alleged Russian war crimes, identified more than 600 suspects, and initiated proceedings against approximately 80 of them.

On 17 March 2023, the ICC issued arrest warrants against Vladimir Putin and Maria Lvova-Belova over allegations of involvement in the war crime of child abductions during the invasion of Ukraine. In 2024, ICC issued arrest warrants for top Russian military officers Sergei Shoigu, Valery Gerasimov, Sergey Kobylash, and Viktor Sokolov for alleged war crimes of directing attacks against civilians and civilian objects in Ukraine.

Allegations against the Armed Forces of Ukraine include mistreatment and executions of Russian prisoners of war.

== Prohibited weapons ==
Russian forces used chemical weapons 465 times between 24 February 2022 and December 2023, according to Ukraine, including K-51 grenades, RGR grenades, Drofa-PM hand gas grenades, and RG-VO gas grenades, which contain an unknown chemical substance. Forbes and CNN reported that they likely used CS gas (tear gas). In May 2023, a television report on Russia's Channel One showed a Russian battalion commander talking about the effectiveness of chemicals used as weapons. The report also showed a drone dropping a tear gas grenade on a dugout. In December 2023, the Russian 810th Guards Naval Infantry Brigade wrote about its use of drones to drop K-51 grenades containing CS tear gas on Ukrainian positions. The use of tear gas is banned by international Chemical Weapons Convention and considered a chemical weapon if applied by military forces during warfare.

In May 2024, the United States Department of State imposed new sanctions against Russian entities and individuals due to Russian forces' use of chloropicrin against Ukrainian troops. In October 2024, the UK imposed sanctions on Russian troops it said were using chemical weapons on the battlefield in Ukraine, accusing Moscow of ″cruel and inhumane tactics″. The Radiological, Chemical and Biological Defence Troops of the Russian Federation and its leader Igor Kirillov were among those sanctioned.

In February 2025 OPCW conducted on-site investigation and confirmed presence of CS in grenade remains at three locations on the Ukrainian side of the front-line. In July 2025, Dutch Defence Minister Ruben Brekelmans said that at least three Ukrainian deaths had been linked to the use of chemical weapons, and 2,500 people had reported symptoms related to chemical weapons to Ukrainian health authorities. Dutch and German intelligence agencies gathered evidence of widespread Russian use of chemical weapons in the war, including using drones to drop a choking agent to force soldiers out of trenches. Brekelmans said that Russia is intensifying its use of chemical weapons by expanding production, research capabilities and recruiting scientists, creating a wider threat to Ukraine and other countries.

== Abduction and deportation ==
The International Criminal Court recognizes abduction and deportation as a war crime and the forced resettlement of children as a form of genocide.

=== Abduction of Ukrainian children ===
According to Ukrainian authorities, Russian forces have kidnapped over 121,000 Ukrainian children and deported them to Russia's eastern provinces. Some of these children's parents had been killed by the Russian military. The Russian State Duma has initiated legislation to formalize the "adoption" of these children.

The Ukrainian Ministry of Foreign Affairs has condemned this act as a "blatant threat of illegal adoption of Ukrainian children by Russian citizens without adhering to the necessary procedures established by Ukrainian law." The Ministry has called on United Nations bodies to intervene in order to facilitate the return of these children to Ukraine.

On 1 June 2022, Ukrainian President Volodymyr Zelenskyy accused Russia of forcibly deporting more than 200,000 children from Ukraine, including orphans and children separated from their families. He described this action as a "heinous war crime" and a "criminal policy," aimed at not only stealing people but also making the deportees forget about Ukraine and hindering their ability to return.

According to Ukrainian officials and two witnesses, Russian forces forcibly deported thousands of residents from Ukraine to Russia during the Siege of Mariupol. On 24 March, the Ukrainian Ministry of Foreign Affairs claimed that the Russian army had forcibly deported about 6,000 Mariupol residents as "hostages" and put more pressure on Ukraine. According to the Russian ministry of defense, residents of Mariupol had a "voluntary choice" whether to evacuate to Ukrainian- or Russian-controlled territory and that by 20 March about 60,000 Mariupol residents were "evacuated to Russia". Human Rights Watch was not been able to verify these accounts.

The US embassy in Kyiv cited the Ukrainian foreign ministry saying that 2,389 Ukrainian children had been illegally removed from Donetsk and Luhansk and taken to Russia.

On 24 March, Ukraine's human rights ombudsman said that over 402,000 Ukrainians had been forcefully taken to Russia, including about 84,000 children. Russian authorities said that more than 384,000 people, including over 80,000 children, had been evacuated to Russia from Ukraine and from the self-proclaimed republics of Donetsk and Luhansk.

Deportation of protected peoples such as civilians during war is prohibited by Article 49 of the Fourth Geneva Convention. On 7 June, Human Rights Watch specialist Tanya Lokshina emphasized this, reiterating that forcible involuntary deportation was itself a war crime, and called for Russia to stop this practice. In addition, Human Rights Watch and Kharkiv Human Rights Protection Group reported cases where refugees were being intimidated and pressured to implicate Armed Forces of Ukraine personnel for war crimes, including the Mariupol theatre airstrike, in long interrogation sessions.

In December 2023, Igor Salikov, a colonel of the Russian army and Wagner Group commander, defected to the Netherlands to testify about "atrocities against civilians" and forced deportation of large groups of children from Ukraine to Belarus.

Deportations due to the 2022 Russian invasion of Ukraine
Time period	Deported	Source
18 February	90,000 (DNR and LNR)	Ombudsman of Ukraine
24 February – 24 March 2022	402,000	Ombudsman of Ukraine
24 February – 11 April 2022	700,000	Ombudsman of Ukraine
24 February – 28 April 2022	1,000,000	Ombudsman of Ukraine

=== Arbitrary detention and forced disappearance ===
In March 2022, the United Nations High Commissioner for Human Rights reported 270 cases of arbitrary detention and enforced disappearance of civilians, eight of whom were later found dead. The OHCHR informed the Human Rights Council that arbitrary detention of civilians, including 21 journalists and civil society activists, had become "widespread" in territory controlled by Russian forces and affiliated armed groups. Nine of them had already reportedly been released. The Human Rights Monitoring Mission also verified the arrests and detention of 24 public officials and civil servants, including three mayors, by Russian armed forces and affiliated armed groups of the self-proclaimed republics of Luhansk and Donetsk.

International humanitarian law allows the internment of civilians in armed conflict only when they individually pose a security threat, and all detained persons whose prisoners of war (PoW) status is in doubt must be treated as prisoners of war under the Geneva Convention until their status has been determined. Reports of missing civilians, most of them male, were rampant to the west of Kyiv as Russian troops withdrew. One woman in Makhariv told reporters she saw Russian soldiers take her son-in-law at gunpoint from their house, and that he had not been seen since. Another man disappeared in Shpytky, while attempting to deliver petrol to a friend. Only his burned out and bullet-ridden car was later found by Ukrainian troops.

On 5 July 2022, the Human Rights Council said that arbitrary detention of civilians had become "widespread" OHCHR also reported that since the beginning of the invasion the Security Service of Ukraine and National Police had arrested over one thousand pro-Russian supporters, and that 12 cases were likely to amount to enforced disappearance by Ukrainian law enforcement bodies.

As of 15 May 2022, 62 victims (44 men and 18 women) of enforced disappearance had been released by Russian and Russian-affiliated armed groups. Most often the victims were released in "exchanges of prisoners" between Russia and Ukraine. According to the OHCHR, such exchanges might constitute cases of hostage taking; if Russia's release of detained Ukrainian civilians was made conditional on Ukraine's release of Russian prisoners of war, this, in armed conflict, amounts to a war crime.

=== Filtration camps ===
Evacuees from Mariupol raised concerns about the treatment of fellow evacuees by Russian troops at a Russian filtration camp that reportedly housed civilians until they were evacuated. Ukrainian officials have called similar camps "modern-day concentration camps". Refugees reported torture and killings at filtration camps, especially in Mariupol. This included beatings, electrocution and suffocation with plastic bags over the heads.

The refugees were fingerprinted, photographed from all sides, and had their phones searched. Anyone believed to be a "Ukrainian Nazi" was taken to Donetsk for interrogation. Refugees told reporters the camps lacked basic necessities and most evacuations forced refugees into Russia.

On 5 July the OHCHR expressed concern about the whereabouts and treatment of those still in the filtration process who were possibly detained in unknown locations at high risk of torture and ill-treatment.

== Attacks on civilians ==
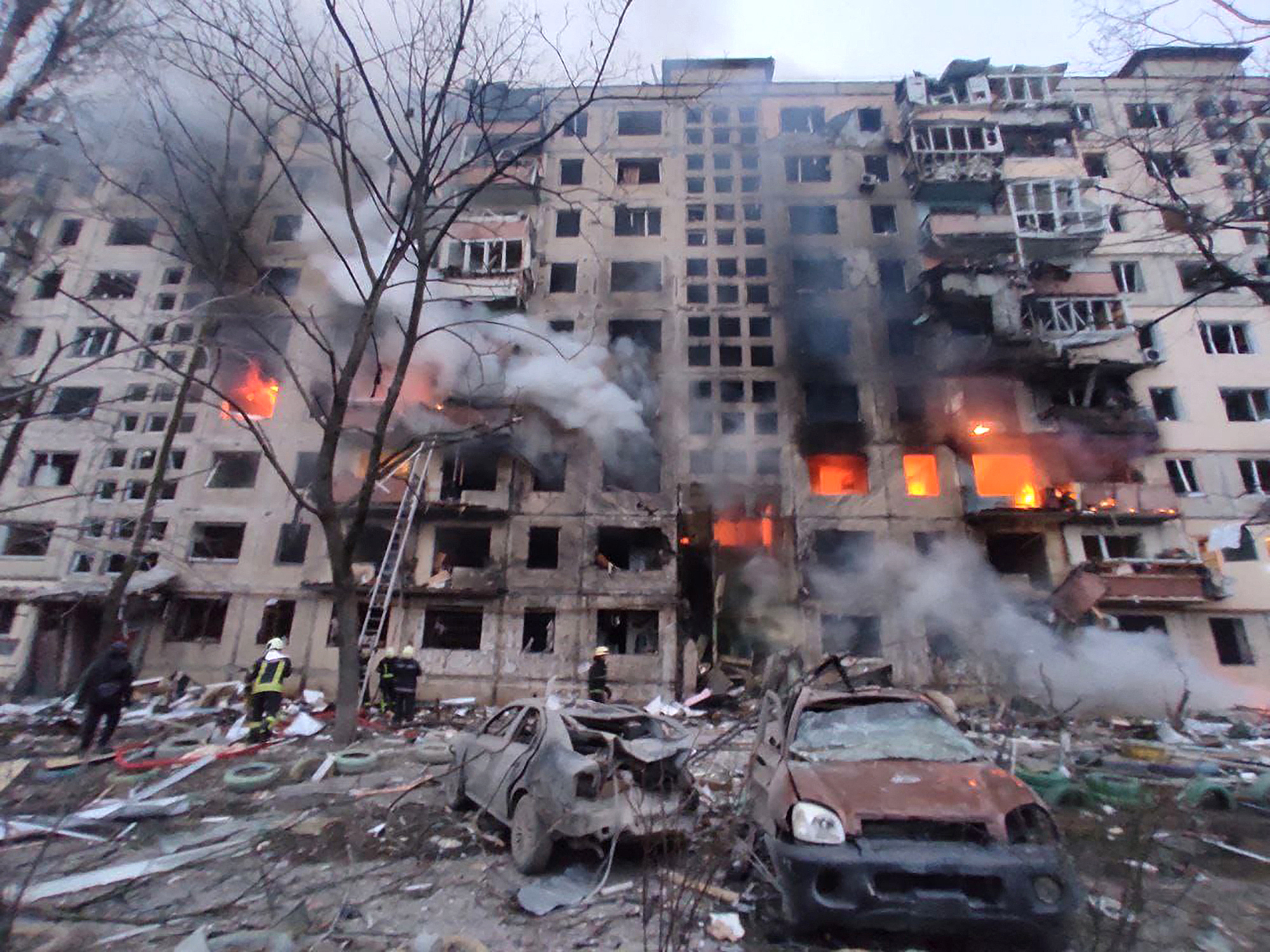
Shelled residential buildings in Kyiv, 14 March 2022

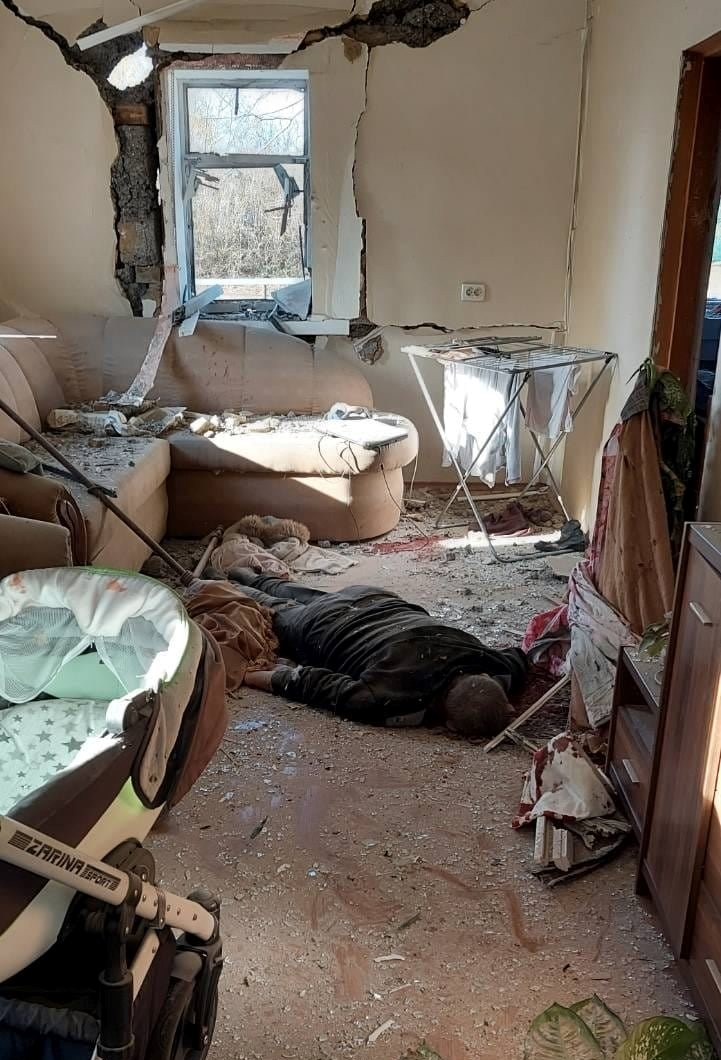
A Ukrainian civilian killed during the Russian bombing of Chernihiv, 28 February 2022

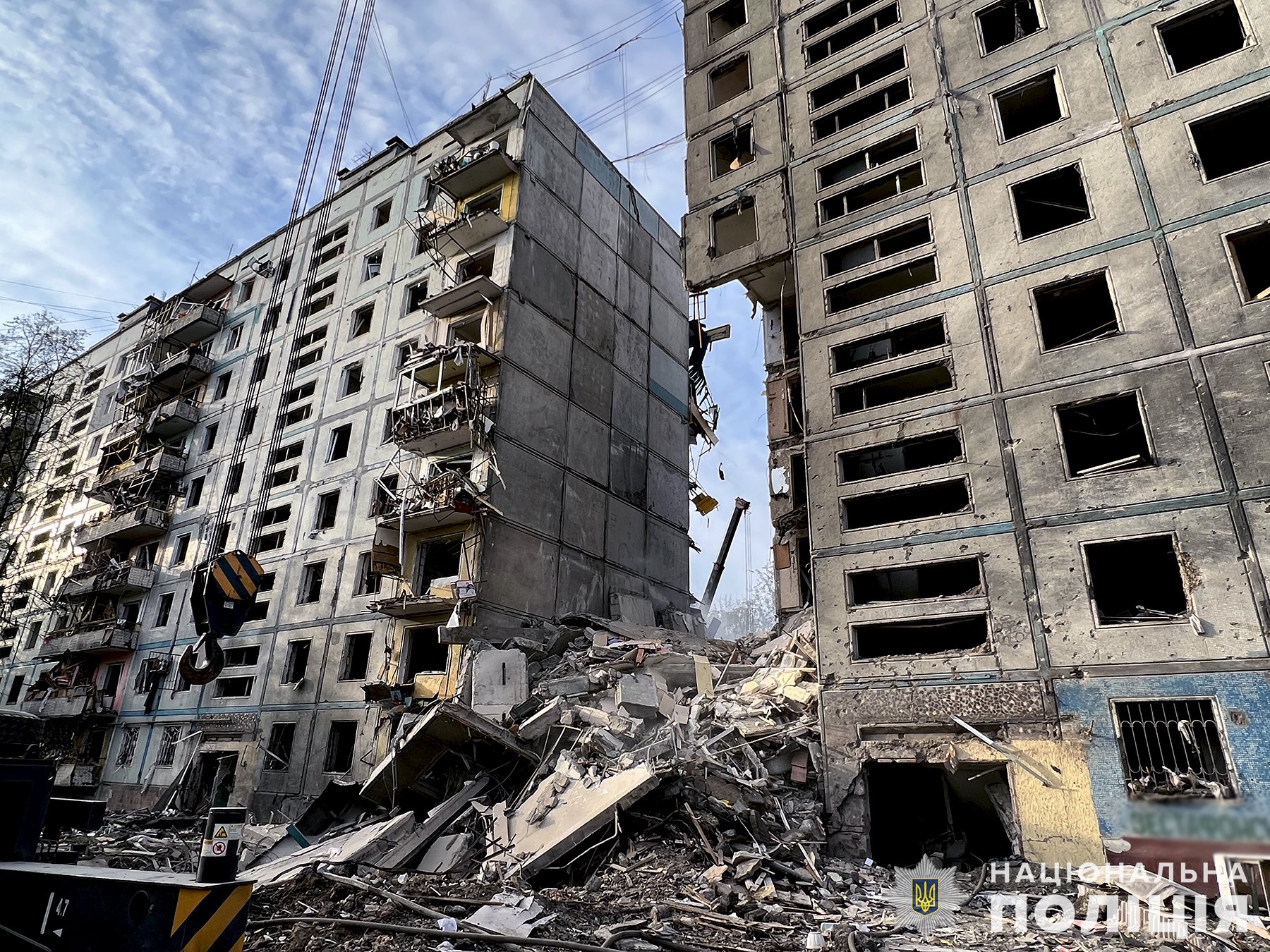
Damage to a residential building in Ukrainian-controlled Zaporizhzhia following the airstrike of 9 October 2022

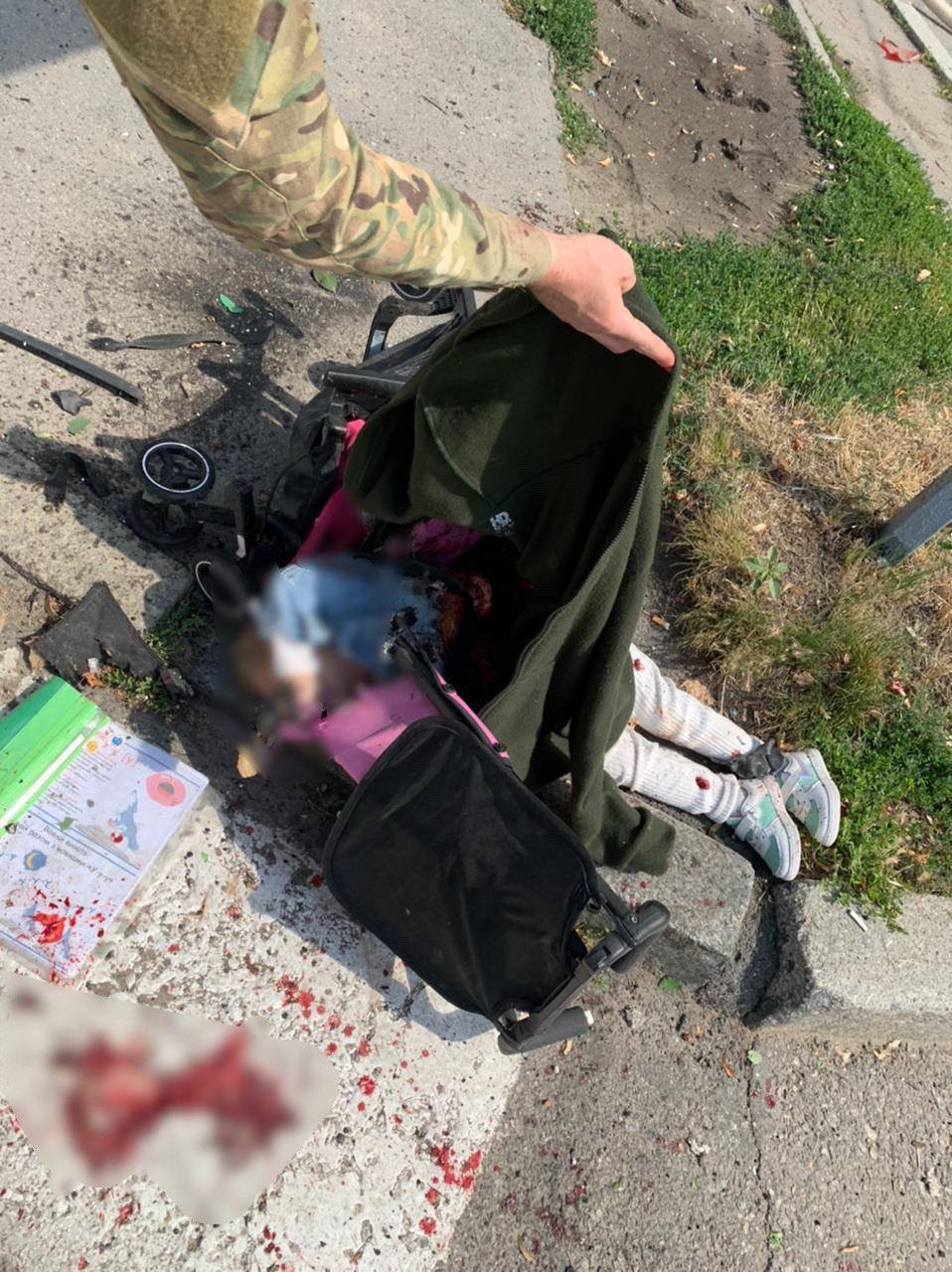
Body of a child killed in a Russian missile attack on the city centre of Vinnytsia

The charter of the International Criminal Court, defines attacks against civilian infrastructure constitute crimes of war. The UN Human Rights Monitoring Mission in Ukraine, said Russia made indiscriminate attacks and strikes on civilian assets like houses, hospitals, schools and kindergartens. On 25 February, Amnesty International said Russian forces had "shown a blatant disregard for civilian lives by using ballistic missiles and other explosive weapons with wide-area effects in densely-populated areas". Russia falsely claimed it only used precision-guided weapons, Amnesty said, and attacks on Vuhledar, Kharkiv and Uman, were likely crimes of war.

A 3 March statement from the Office of the United Nations High Commissioner for Human Rights said it recorded at least 1006 civilian casualties in the first week of the invasion, but believed the real figures were "considerably higher."

The World Health Organization said on 6 March that multiple health care centres had been attacked, and Director-General Tedros Adhanom Ghebreyesus noted that "attacks on healthcare facilities or workers breach medical neutrality and violate international humanitarian law."

Amnesty reported that Russia repeatedly violated international humanitarian law with indiscriminate attacks and direct attacks on civilian targets. Amnesty verified reports and footage demonstrated numerous strikes on hospitals and schools and the use of inaccurate explosive weapons and banned weapons such as cluster bombs.

On 5 July, UN High Commissioner for Human Rights Michelle Bachelet reported that most civilian casualties documented by her office were caused by the Russians' repeated use of explosive weapons in populated areas, and that the heavy civilian toll from indiscriminate weapons and tactics had become "indisputable".

Reports on the use of cluster munitions in populated areas of Ukraine raised concerns about civilian casualties. Neither the Russian Federation nor Ukraine ratified the 2008 Convention on Cluster Munitions, but principles of international humanitarian law prohibit indiscriminate and disproportionate attacks. The Office of the United Nations High Commissioner for Human Rights said cluster munitions were used by both Russian armed forces and pro-Russian separatists, and to a lesser degree by Ukrainian armed forces.

The New York Times reported on 19 June 2023 it had seen over 1000 photographs of cluster munitions in populated areas. It said most were unguided missiles with a propensity for collateral damage to civilians.

In November 2024, Amnesty International reported that 2024 had seen a significant increase in civilian casualties, particularly highlighting attacks, including war crimes, resulting in children killed and injured in Russian airstrikes. Amnesty said it had verified over 120 videos and images of attacks against children in 2024, data suggesting the summer being the deadliest period.

On 14 May 2026, senior UN official Bernadette Castel-Hollingsworth referred to Russian attacks across Ukraine using nearly 800 drones and 56 missiles with nearly 24 hours of continuous strikes as a ″clear violation of humanitarian law″, reiterating that civilians must be protected and not targeted. According to Ukrainian authorities, the attacks resulted in 15 killed and 127 wounded civilians, including six children.

=== Kyiv and Chernihiv oblasts ===
Human Rights Watch said that in Staryi Bykiv Russian forces rounded up at least six men on 27 February 2022 and executed them. The soldiers left on 31 March after more executions. Most property in Staryi Bykiv and Novyi Bykiv was damaged or destroyed, including the school.

On 28 February, five civilians defending the post office in Peremoha were reportedly summarily executed by Russians, who later blew up the post office.

On 7 March, a Ukrainian Territorial Defense Forces drone near E40 highway outside Kyiv filmed Russian troops shooting a civilian with his hands up. When Ukrainian forces recaptured the area four weeks later, a BBC news crew found the burned bodies of the man and his wife near their burned car. At least ten dead bodies lined the highway, some also burnt. Two wore recognisable Ukrainian military uniforms. The drone footage was submitted to Ukrainian authorities and London's Metropolitan Police.

Russian forces progressed 26 March 2022 towards Donbas. Borodianka's mayor said Russian soldiers fired through every open window as their convoy moved through town. Retreating Russians also mined the town. Its inhabitants later reported that Russian occupiers had deliberately targeted them and blocked rescue efforts.

Kyiv regional police reported on 15 April that 900 civilian bodies were found in the region after the Russians withdrew, with more than 350 in Bucha. They said almost 95% of them were "simply executed". Bodies continued to be found under rubble and in mass graves. As of 15 May, over 1,200 civilian bodies had been recovered in Kyiv Oblast alone.

The Ukrainian Defense Ministry said another 132 were found in Makariv, and accused Russians of torturing and killing them.

On 5 July 2022, the OHCHR said it was working on over 300 reports of deliberate Russian killings of civilians. with prima facie evidence, witness statements, and Ukrainian intercepts of Russian military conversations, and Russian contingency planning for mass graves.

=== Bucha massacre ===
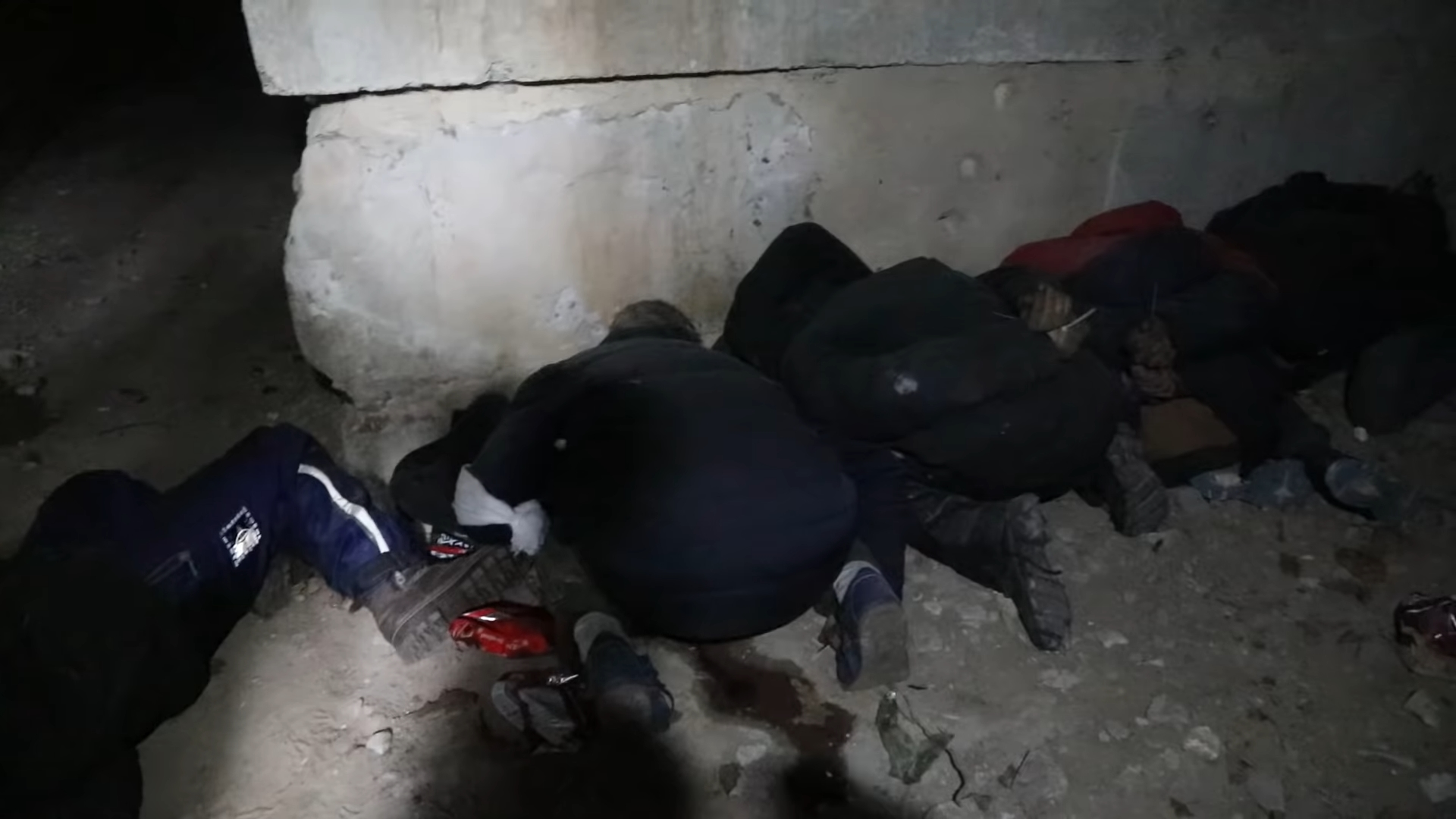
Executed civilians with wrists bound in plastic restraints, in a basement in Bucha, 3 April 2022

Russian forces north of Kyiv withdrew in late March, Videos emerged of bodies in the streets, at least twenty in civilian clothing. Agence France-Presse saw at least twenty civilians corpses in the street, all shot in the back of the head. At least one had its hands tied, Another 270 to 280 were buried in mass graves. Police said on 15 April they had found 350 bodies in Bucha, most with gunshot wounds.

Drone video verified by The New York Times showed two Russian armoured vehicles firing at a civilian walking a bicycle. A later video showed the body lying next to a bicycle. The Economist reported a man trapped at a checkpoint who took artillery fire then was captured, beaten and tortured, then taken outside to be shot. He played dead until he could flee. BBC News reported tied bodies of civilians at a temple, run over by a tank.

Territorial Defence Forces released video of 18 mutilated bodies in Zabuchchia, Bucha Raion. A Ukrainian soldier said some bodies had their ears cut off and the teeth of others had been pulled. Radio Free Europe/Radio Liberty reported a Russian "execution cellar" used by Russian forces. Russian soldiers killed a woman and her 14-year-old after they threw smoke grenades into a basement where they hid.

Russian tanks entered Bucha shooting randomly at house windows as they drove down the streets. The New York Times said snipers in high-rise buildings shot at anyone that moved. A witness told Radio Free Europe/Radio Liberty that Russians "were killing people systematically. I personally heard how one sniper was boasting that he 'offed' two people he saw in apartment windows..." Troops fired at civilians seeking food and water, witnesses said, and ordered them back inside without basic necessities like water and heat. Russian troops shot indiscriminately at buildings and refused medical aid to injured civilians, HRW said.

Russian soldiers checked documents and killed anyone who had fought in Donbas or had tattoos of right-wing or Ukrainian symbols, said a witness. In the last days of occupation, Kadyrovite Chechen fighters shot at every civilian they met. A resident said Russians checked cell phones for evidence of "anti-Russian activity" before they took people away or shot them.

The Associated Press saw charred bodies on a residential street near a playground in Bucha on 5 April. One had a bullet hole in its skull, another was the burned body of a child. They could not identify them or determine how they died. Ukrainian investigators found beheadings, mutilation and incinerated corpses, and the next day three more bodies in a glass factory, The Washington Post reported. At least one body was booby-trapped, mined with tripwires. HRW reported "extensive evidence of summary executions... and torture" in Bucha and 16 apparently unlawful killings, nine summary executions and seven indiscriminate killings of civilians.

The New York Times on 19 May released video of Russian paratroopers leading a group of civilians, clearly in Russian custody minutes before their execution. The video confirms eyewitness accounts.

By 8 August 458 bodies were recovered, including 9 children; 419 were killed with weapons and 39 died of natural causes possibly related to the occupation.

On 7 December OHCHR reported that the Monitoring Mission in Ukraine had documented at least 73 unlawful killings of civilians in Bucha and were still confirming another 105.

=== Kharkiv Oblast ===
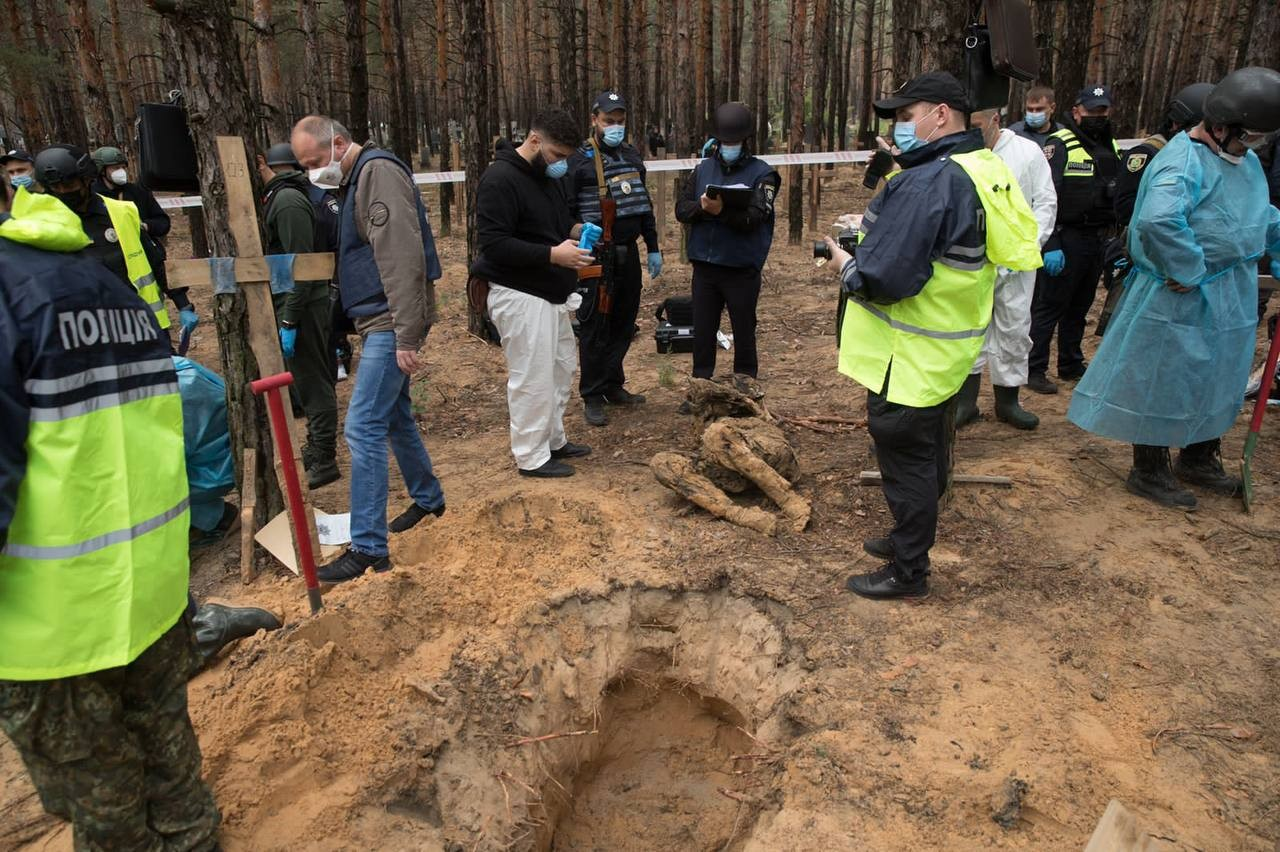
Bodies being exhumed from mass graves in Izium

On 15 September 2022, after Russian forces were driven out of Izium hundreds of graves with simple wooden crosses, most of them marked only with numbers, were found in the woods near the city. One of the larger graves bore a marker saying it contained the bodies of at least 17 Ukrainian soldiers. Ukrainian investigators said 447 bodies were found: 414 of them civilians (215 men, 194 women, 5 children), 22 soldiers, and 11 bodies whose gender had not yet been determined as of 23 September. While some casualties were caused by artillery fire and lack of healthcare, most showed signs of violent death and 30 of torture and summary execution, including ropes around their necks, bound hands, broken limbs and genital amputation.

In Kupiansk, local law enforcement found the bodies of a family of three and their neighbour, shot at close range in mid-September and buried in a mass grave. The bodies had bullet wounds to the chest and head. Automatic weapon casings were found in a nearby cellar. On 6 October, police found two bodies of tortured men in a brick-making workshop, one with a gunshot wound.

On 5 October 2022, mass graves were also found in Lyman, Ukrainian troops and law enforcement found 110 trenches containing graves, some for children, at the Nova Masliakivka cemetery. Both civilians and soldiers, the 55 bodies showed "explosive and projectile injuries, as well as bullet injuries". Among the dead were a family and their 1-year-old child. 34 bodies of Ukrainian soldiers were also found, in total, 144 bodies were found in the city, 108 of which in mass graves, among the dead, 85 were civilians. Witnesses said Russian troops killed everyone who helped Ukrainian soldiers, and forced locals to bury the bodies. They said many bodies were left for days in the street.

On 30 August 2024, officials said that six people had died, including a 14-year-old girl, and 55 people had been wounded following a Russian guided bomb attack on Kharkiv that struck a 12-story apartment block and playground. Following the attack, US ambassador Bridget Brink called on Russia to be "held accountable for these war crimes" in Kharkiv.

On 4 November 2025, a pre-trial war-crimes investigation in Kharkiv was opened after a video recorded near Kruhliakivka appeared to show a Russian drone killing two civilians and their dog. According to the statement by Kharkiv's Regional Prosecutor's Office, the civilians were carrying a white flag as they were walking along the road when they were struck and killed by the drone.

=== Trostianets ===
After Trostianets in Sumy Oblast was retaken, the morgue reported that at least one person had been tortured and killed by Russians, and young people abducted. The hospital was also shelled; the locals accused the Russians.

Reporters from The Guardian visited the town after it was retaken and found evidence of executions, looting and torture. The mayor said Russians killed between 50 and 100 civilians during their occupation of the town. A witness said Russian soldiers fired into the air to frighten women delivering food to the elderly, shouting "Run bitches!".

=== Shooting at civilian vehicles ===
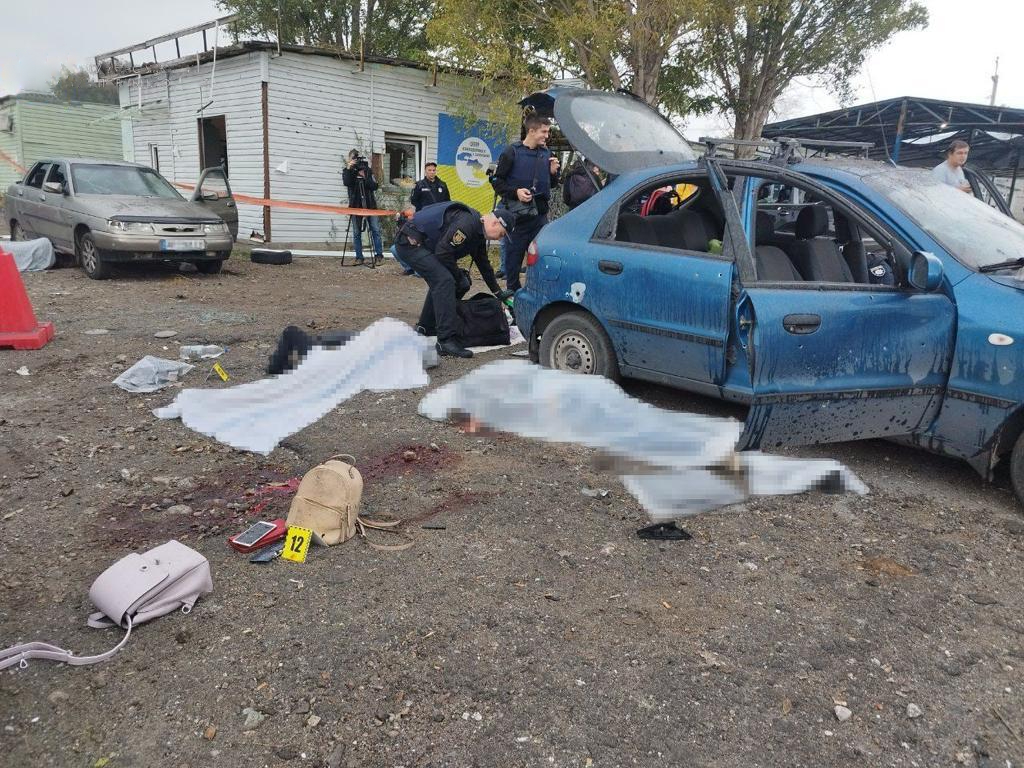
Killed Ukrainian civilians during the Zaporizhzhia civilian convoy attack by Russian Army with S-300 missile systems in September 2022

According to Ukrainian regional authorities, at least 25 civilians, including six children, were killed in attacks on cars trying to flee Chernihiv, or attacked in public places; one such incident involved the killing of a 15-year-old boy on 9 March, investigated by the BBC and reported on 10 April. On 2 May a Human Rights Watch report documented three incidents in Kyiv and Chernihiv oblasts where Russians firing on passing cars, killing six civilians and wounding three. Witness accounts and onsite investigations revealed that the attacks were likely deliberate and suggested that the Russians also fired on other vehicles.

On 28 February, Russian forces shot at two vehicles that were trying to flee from Hostomel, northwest of Kyiv. On 3 March, in the same area, they opened fire on a vehicle with four men who were going to negotiate the delivery of humanitarian aid. In the village of Nova Basan, in Chernihiv Oblast, Russian soldiers shot at a civilian van carrying two men, injuring one; then pulled the second man from the van and summarily executed him, while the injured man escaped.

CCTV video also from 28 February shows that two civilians (a 72-year-old man and a 68-year-old woman) were killed when their car was blown apart by shots from a Russian BMP armoured infantry fighting vehicle at the intersection of Bogdan Khmelnytsky Street and Okruzhna Road, near the hospital in Makariv.

The Kyiv Independent reported that on 4 March Russian forces killed three unarmed Ukrainian civilians who had just delivered dog food to a dog shelter in Bucha. As they were approaching their house, a Russian armored vehicle opened fire on the car. In another incident, on 5 March at around 7:15 AM in Bucha, a pair of cars carrying two families trying to leave the town were spotted by Russian soldiers as the vehicles turned onto Chkalova Street. Russian forces in an armored vehicle opened fire on the convoy, killing a man in the second vehicle. The front car was hit by a burst of machine-gun fire, instantly killing two children and their mother.

On 27 March the Russian army shot at a convoy of cars carrying civilians fleeing the village of Stepanki, near Kharkiv. An elderly woman and a 13-year-old girl were killed. The incident was investigated both by the team on war crimes of the prosecutor's office in the Kharkiv Oblast and by the Canadian news outlet Global News. The prosecutor's office said that on 26 March a Russian commander had given the order to fire rockets at civilian areas in order to create a sense of panic among the population. Global News presented what it saw as flaws in the official investigation.

On 18 April, during the capture of Kreminna, Russian forces were accused of shooting four civilians fleeing in their cars.

=== Double tap strikes ===
Russia has been accused of carrying out "double tap" strikes during its invasion of Ukraine. On 28 September 2024, Ukrainian officials said that eight people had died following two consecutive Russian drone attacks on a medical centre in Sumy. Interior Minister Ihor Klymenko and regional prosecutors said that the second attack took place as patients and staff were evacuating, and rescuers and police were providing assistance. The "double tap" method has been criticized as a war crime, as it is aimed at civilians rushing to help the wounded.

On 2 November 2026, Ukrainian officials reported that Russian forces conducted a double tap strike on a school being used as a center for humanitarian aid in Komyshuvakha. Council of Europe Commissioner for Human Rights Michael O'Flaherty condemned the strike as a violation of international humanitarian law and said the attacks amounted to war crimes.

=== Deliberate targeting of civilians using drones ===
In October 2024, Forbes reported that Russians were using drones to deliberately target civilians in Kherson, and then ″proudly″ sharing the footage of the attacks on social media. Attacks being ″shared and celebrated″ included on commuters, people at bus stops, and on children playing in parks. This terror campaign has become known as the ″Human Safari″. Deliberate attacks on civilians are outlawed in the Geneva Conventions, and Forbes stated that the perpetrators posting evidence of their crimes online should make them easier to trace in war crimes investigations.

In May 2025, a UN report concluded that the regular drone attacks on civilians in Kherson, which had killed almost 150 people and injured hundreds more according to officials, of which videos are also shared on Russian Telegram channels, amount to the war crimes of intentionally directing attacks against civilians and outrages upon personal dignity. The report also described the Russian armed forces murdering of civilians with drones as crimes against humanity.

On 18 December 2025, the head of the Odesa Oblast Military Administration, Oleh Kiper, said that a Russian drone struck a civilian car that was driving across a bridge in Odesa, the driver of the car was killed while her three children that were in the car were injured. Kiper called the attack a ″cynical war crime″.

=== Kupiansk civilian convoy shooting ===
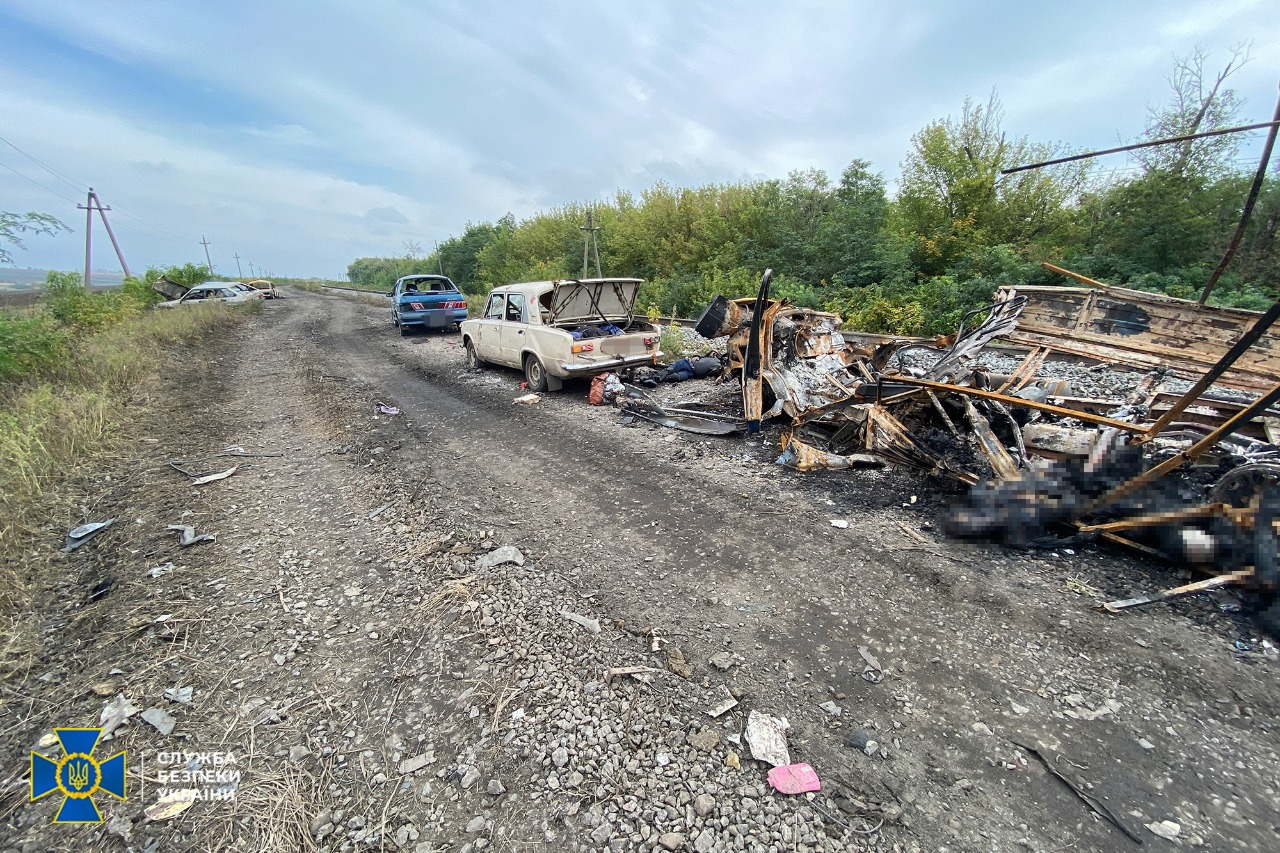
Aftermath of the attack on the civilian convoy in Kupiansk

On 30 September, a convoy of six civilian cars and a van on the outskirts of the village of Kurylivka (at that time in the so-called "gray zone" between Kupiansk and Svatove) was discovered by Ukrainian forces, with around 24 people killed, including a pregnant woman and 13 children. Ukraine accused Russian forces of being the perpetrators. Investigations suggested that the civilians were killed around 25 September.

The bodies were apparently shot and burned out, according to 7 witnesses who managed to flee to the village of Kivsharivka, the convoy was ambushed by Russian forces on 25 September at around ~9:00 AM (UTC+3) while leaving for the village of Pishchane through the only available road at that time, after the attack, the Russian troops reportedly executed the remaining survivors. During the month, law enforcement officers identified all the victims of the convoy. 22 people managed to escape, 3 of those (including 2 children) injured. in the following days, 2 other bodies were found, with the final death toll being 26. Some of the physical evidence (the bodies of the victims and the car) was examined by French experts. They discovered signs of the use of 30 mm and 45 mm high-explosive shells, as well as VOG-17 and VOG-25 grenades.

=== Shooting of Andrii Bohomaz ===
In June 2022, Russian troops fired at Andrii Bohomaz and Valeria Ponomarova, a married couple in a car in the Izium area. The car was struck with a 30 millimetre round fired from the gun on a BMP-2 fighting vehicle. The couple fled from their damaged car after the attack, Bohomaz had been badly injured in the head, Russian troops later found him, and, incorrectly assuming he was dead, dropped him in a ditch, he woke up 30 hours later, with several injuries and shrapnels lodged in his body.

Bohomaz later managed to walk to a Ukrainian position, being rescued and given first aid by Ukrainian troops. Ukrainian forces later liberated the region, allowing them to start an investigation about the shooting, Ukrainian police have accused Russian commander Klim Kerzhaev of the 2nd Guards Motor Rifle Division for being responsible for the shooting, based on interceptions of his phone calls to his wife after the shooting.

=== 2025 Kryvyi Rih missile strike ===
On 4 April 2025, Russia struck a dense residential area in Kryvyi Rih with a missile, spraying shrapnel which also hit a playground. The attack killed 20 people, 11 adults and nine children, and dozens of people were injured. The United Nations called the strike Russia's deadliest attack on Ukrainian children in the three years since the invasion started. Oleksandr Vilkul, head of the city's military administration, referred to the attack as a war crime.

Ukraine charged Aleksey Kim, Vice Admiral Alexander Peshkov, Rear Admiral Aleksey Petrushyn, and Col. Alexander Kisiedobriev with war crimes under Part 2 of Article 28 and Part 2 of Article 438 of Ukraine's Criminal Code.

=== April 2025 ballistic missile strike ===
On 13 April 2025, Russian missiles struck Sumy residents gathering for Sunday church services, killing at least 32 people, including two children, and wounding at least 99 people, including 11 children according to the Interior Ministry of Ukraine. Ukrainian officials said that the attack was carried out using two ballistic missiles and cluster munitions were used in order to kill as many civilians as possible. According to Ukraine's Economy Minister Yulia Svyrydenko, the attack was carried out on one of the busiest church-going days of the year. CNN verified social media footage of the attack. The attack was the deadliest single attack on Ukrainian civilians since 2023, when 51 civilians were killed in strikes on Kupiansk. The attack was internationally condemned, with the Trump administration's special envoy to Ukraine and Russia, Keith Kellogg, commenting on the attack saying it ″crosses any line of decency″. The European Union's foreign policy chief, Kaja Kallas, also commented, calling the strike a ″horrific example of Russia intensifying attacks while Ukraine has accepted an unconditional ceasefire″, while French President Emmanuel Macron said ″strong measures″ are needed for a ceasefire. Military expert Joakim Paasikivi referred to the strikes as an ″obvious war crime″, noting the usage of ballistic missiles on the city center of Sumy and the number of killed and wounded.

=== Shooting of evacuating civilian ===
In August 2025, Ukraine's Prosecutor General's Office opened a war crimes investigation into the shooting and killing of a civilian trying to evacuate from Udachne in Donetsk. A video posted on Telegram was described as showing the civilian carrying a suitcase with what appeared to be belongings walking on the side of the road, when he was gunned down by a Russian soldier in an ambush position in a nearby building.

=== Russian drone attack on UN humanitarian convoy ===
In October 2025, The UN's Office for Coordination of Humanitarian Affairs in Ukraine reported that a UN convoy had been struck by Russian drones while delivering aid in southern Ukraine. It condemned the attack as a severe breach of international humanitarian law and a potential war crime, saying that two trucks of the World Food Programme had been struck and damaged by the drones, but reported no wounded.

== Attacks on hospitals and medical facilities ==
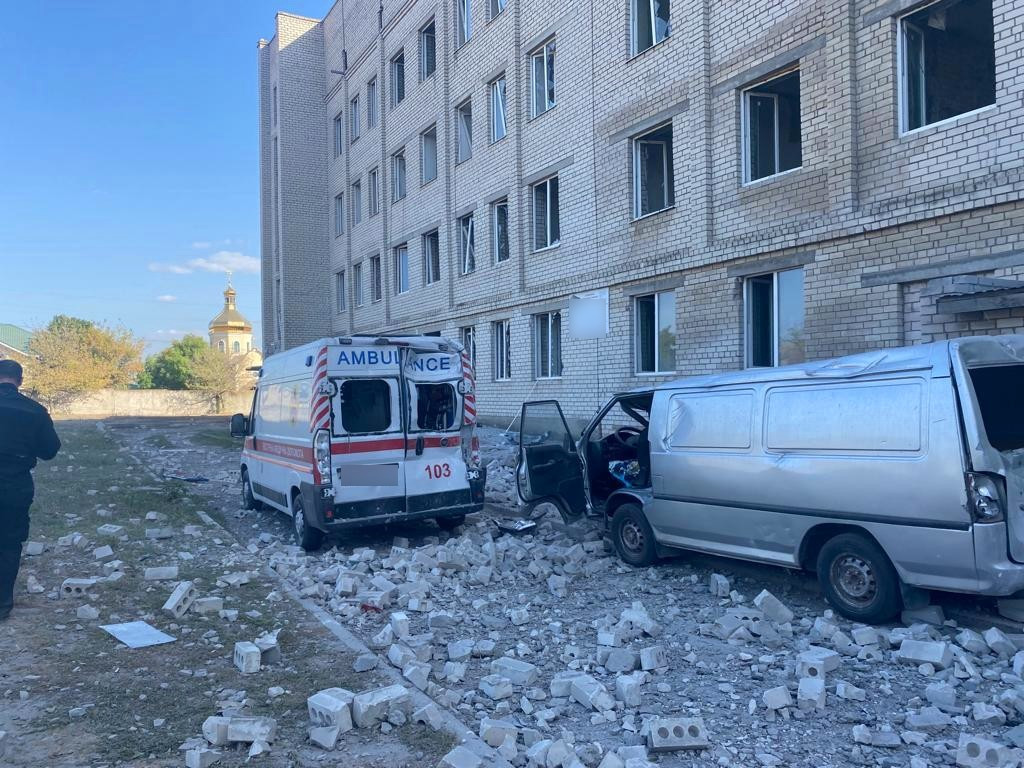
Hospital in Beryslav (Kherson region) after Russian shelling on 5 October 2023

As of 26 March 2022, the UN Human Rights Monitoring Mission in Ukraine verified 74 attacks on medical facilities, 61 of them in Government-controlled territory (e.g. air strikes on hospitals in Izium, Mariupol, Ovruch, Volnovakha and Vuhledar), nine occurring in territory controlled by Russian affiliated armed groups, and four in contested settlements. Six perinatal centres, maternity hospitals, and ten children's hospitals had been hit, resulting in the complete destruction of two children's hospitals and one perinatal hospital. On 26 March, journalists from the Associated Press claimed they had gathered sufficient evidence to demonstrate that Russia was deliberately targeting Ukrainian hospitals across the country.

On 7 March 2022, the Ukrainian armed forces reportedly took positions at a care house in the village of Stara Krasnianka, near Kreminna, Luhansk Oblast, due to house's strategic location, with the evacuation reportedly impossible due to mining. On 11 March 2022, Russia-affiliated forces attacked the care house with heavy weapons while 71 patients with disabilities and 15 members of staff were still inside. A fire broke out and approximately fifty people died. Ukraine's prosecutor general office announced war crimes charges against Russia for the attack. The area was under Russian control, and Ukrainian investigators had been unable to access the site. The OHCHR published a report which found that Russia did not commit any war crimes, or that Ukraine used human shields, but it expressed concern about allegations of this occurring. The report found that Ukrainian forces occupied the building before the attack, thus care home patients were not the intended target.

On 30 March 2022, the World Health Organization (WHO) reported that there had been 82 verified Russian attacks on medical care in Ukraine – including attacks on healthcare facilities, patients, and healthcare workers – since 24 February. WHO estimated at least 72 were killed and 43 injured in these attacks. By 8 April, WHO confirmed 91 attacks.

As of 30 May 2023, WHO has verified 1,004 attacks on medical facilities in Ukraine since the beginning of the Russian invasion, resulting in at least 101 deaths among health workers and patients, and many injuries. The number of attacks verified by WHO is the highest it has ever recorded in a humanitarian emergency. By 21 December 2023, the number of attacks on health care had risen to 1,422, as reported by the WHO Surveillance System for Attacks on Health Care (SSA) tool.

On 8 July 2024, a daytime Russian missile attack hit Okhmatdyt hospital, Ukraine's largest children's hospital. Ihor Klymenko, the interior minister, said five people had been confirmed dead in the attack and at least four more had been injured. A later report stated another child had died after being evacuated, and that ten children were injured in the attack. In September 2026, the Russian general suspected by Ukraine to be responsible for ordering the attack, Nikolai Varpakhovich, was reportedly shot in the head twice by an unknown individual. Ukraine has not confirmed involvement in the shooting, but Ukraine's Main Directorate of Intelligence have previously said ″retribution″ awaited Russian war criminals.

== Destruction of energy infrastructure ==
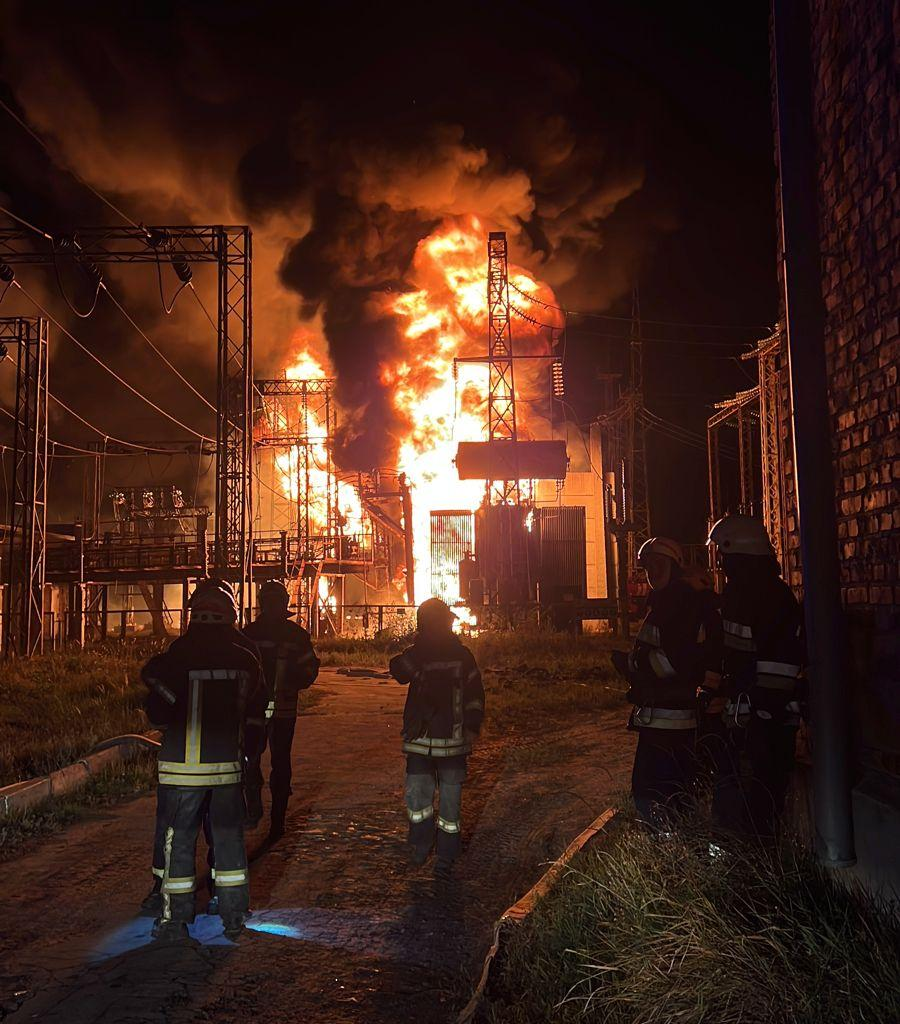
Fire at the Kharkiv TEC-5 power plant after a Russian missile strike on 11 September 2022.

After October 2022, Russia increased the intensity of its attacks on power stations and other civilian infrastructure in a campaign intended to demoralize the Ukrainian people and threatening to leave millions of civilians without heating or water during winter. As of 20 October 2022, up to 40% of Ukraine's power grid has been attacked by Russia. The government has asked citizens to conserve energy, and introduced rolling blackouts.

The World Health Organization has warned of a potential humanitarian crisis, saying that "lack of access to fuel or electricity due to damaged infrastructure could become a matter of life or death if people are unable to heat their homes." Denise Brown, the United Nations Resident Coordinator for Ukraine, said that the attacks could result in "a high risk of mortality during the winter months."

Ravina Shamdasani, a spokesperson for the Office of the United Nations High Commissioner for Human Rights, said that "attacks targeting civilians and objects indispensable to the survival of civilians are prohibited under international humanitarian law" and "amount to a war crime." The President of the European Commission Ursula von der Leyen and 11 members of NATO's eastern flank also called the attacks a war crime.

In his comprehensive analysis, Charles J. Dunlap Jr., executive director of Duke Law School's Centre on Law, Ethics and National Security and former deputy judge advocate general of the U.S. Air Force, pointed to the view that "[e]lectric power stations are generally recognized to be of sufficient importance to a State's capacity to meet its wartime needs of communication, transport, and industry so as usually to qualify as military objectives during armed conflicts", furthermore that they have been a favourite target for almost a century, and that Ukraine did resort to similar tactics in 2015.

In February 2026, president Zelenskyy said Russia had used a ″record number″ of ballistic missiles, along with hundreds of drones, to target the Ukrainian energy sector, launching strikes amid freezing temperatures. The energy company DTEK said that some of the targeted infrastructure was not providing electricity, but exclusively heat for civilian use. According to the Geneva Convention targeting civilian infrastructure is a potential war crime.

In October 2026, an independent commission of inquiry found Russia guilty of war crimes and crimes against humanity in Ukraine by intentionally targeting energy infrastructure, resulting in millions of people being left without heat and electricity, including in freezing temperatures.

== Destruction and theft of cultural heritage ==
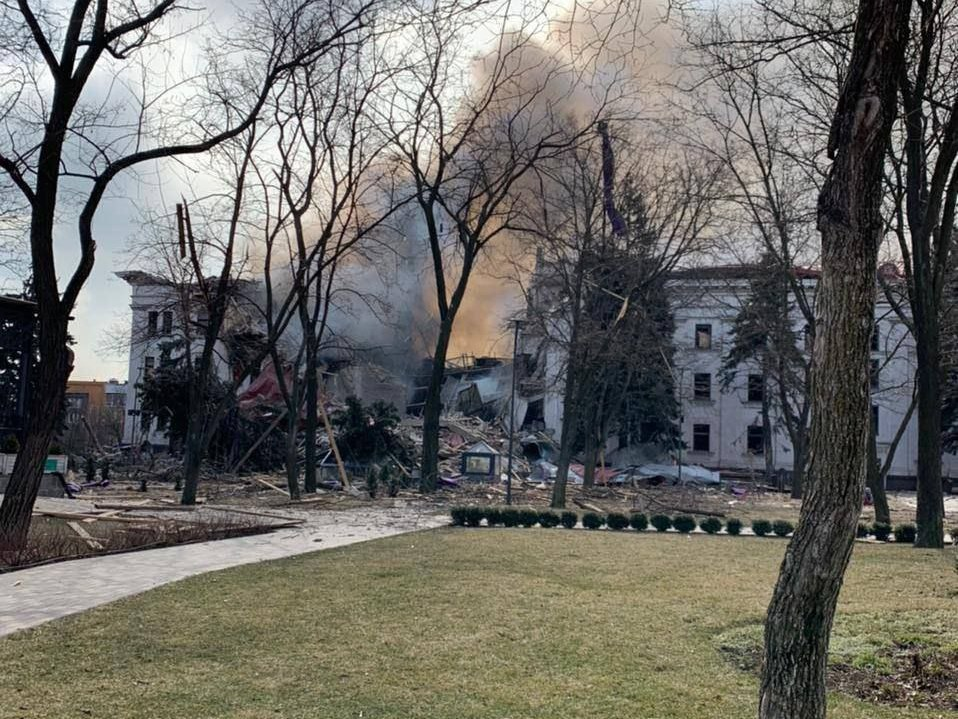
The Drama Theatre in Mariupol was mostly destroyed on 16 March 2022, while sheltering at least 1,300 people inside

According to the United Nations, intentional attacks against buildings dedicated to religion, education, art, science or charitable purposes, historic monuments, or hospitals not being used as military infrastructure is a war crime.

The use of explosive weapons with wide-area effects has raised concerns about the proximity of historic monuments, works of art, churches and other cultural properties. Russian forces damaged or destroyed the Kuindzhi Art Museum in Mariupol, the Soviet-era Shchors cinema and a Gothic revival library in Chernihiv, the Babyn Yar Holocaust memorial complex in Kyiv, the Soviet-era Slovo building and the regional state administration building in Kharkiv, a 19th-century wooden church in Viazivka, Zhytomyr Oblast, and the Historical and Local History Museum in Ivankiv. On 24 June, UNESCO stated that at least 150 Ukrainian historical sites, religious buildings, and museums were confirmed to have sustained damage during the Russian invasion.

Cultural property enjoys special protection under international humanitarian law. Protocol I of the Geneva Convention and the Hague Convention for the Protection of Cultural Property in the Event of Armed Conflict (both binding on Ukraine and Russia) prohibits state parties from targeting historic monuments in support of a military effort and from making them the objects of acts of hostility or reprisals. Protocol II of the Hague Convention allows attacks on a cultural property only in case of "imperative military necessity" provided that there is no feasible alternative. While Protocol II does not apply as such, as only Ukraine is a party and it applies only between parties, the provision on imperative military necessity may be applicable if it is interpreted as informing the convention, rather than adding to it. Attacks against cultural heritage may amount to war crimes and can be prosecuted before the International Criminal Court.

== Torture of civilians ==
The International Criminal Court, based on the Geneva Convention, defines murder, cruel or degrading treatment and torture as a war crime. The United Nations Special Rapporteur on torture said in September 2023 that Russia's use of torture "is not random, aberrant behavior," but "orchestrated as part of state policy to intimidate, instill fear or punish to extract information and confessions".

On 22 March the non-profit organization Reporters Without Borders reported that Russian forces had captured a Ukrainian fixer and interpreter for Radio France on 5 March as he headed home to a village in Central Ukraine. He was held captive for nine days and subjected to electric shocks, beatings with an iron bar and a mock execution. On 25 March Reporters Without Borders stated that Russian forces had threatened, kidnapped, detained and tortured several Ukrainian journalists in the occupied territories. Torture is prohibited by both Article 32 of the Fourth Geneva Convention and Article 2 of the United Nations Convention against Torture.

In April Human Rights Watch visited 17 villages in Kyiv Oblast and Chernihiv Oblast that had been under Russian occupation from late February through March 2022. The human rights organisation investigated 22 summary executions, 9 unlawful killings, 6 enforced disappearances, and 7 cases of torture. Witnesses reported that Russian soldiers beat detainees, used electric shocks, and carried out mock executions to coerce them to provide information. Twenty-one civilians described unlawful confinement in inhuman and degrading conditions.

On 4 April, Dementiy Bilyi, head of the Kherson regional department of the Committee of Voters of Ukraine, said that the Russian security forces were "beating, torturing, and kidnapping" civilians in the Kherson Oblast of Ukraine. He added that eyewitnesses had described "dozens" of arbitrary searches and detentions, resulting in an unknown number of abducted persons. At least 400 residents had gone missing by 16 March, with the mayor and deputy mayor of the town of Skadovsk being abducted by armed men. A leaked letter described Russian plans to unleash a "great terror" to suppress protests occurring in Kherson, stating that people would "have to be taken from their homes in the middle of the night".

Russian soldiers were also accused of murders, tortures, and beatings of civilians in Borodianka during the withdrawal.

Ukrainians who escaped from occupied Kherson into Ukrainian-controlled territory provided testimonies of torture, abuse and kidnapping by Russian forces in the region. One person from Bilozerka in Kherson Oblast provided physical evidence of having been tortured by Russians and described beatings, electrocutions, mock executions, strangulations, threats to kill family members and other forms of torture.

An investigation by the BBC gathered evidence of torture, which in addition to beatings also included electrocution and burns on people's hands and feet. A doctor who treated victims of torture in the region reported: "Some of the worst were burn marks on genitals, a gunshot wound to the head of a girl who was raped, and burns from iron on a patient's back and stomach. The patient told me two wires from a car battery were attached to his groin and he was told to stand on a wet rag". In addition to the BBC, the Human Rights Watch UN Human Rights Monitoring Mission in Ukraine has reported on torture and "disappearances" carried out by Russian occupation forces in the region. One resident stated: "In Kherson, now people go missing all the time (...) there is a war going on, only this part is without bombs."

Kherson's elected Ukrainian mayor has compiled a list of more than 300 people who had been kidnapped by Russian forces as of 15 May 2022. According to The Times, in the building housing the Russian occupation authorities, the screams of the tortured could be frequently heard throughout the corridors.

On 22 July Human Rights Watch published a report documenting 42 cases of torture, unlawful detention and enforced disappearance of civilians in the Russian-occupied areas of Kherson and Zaporizhzhia oblasts. Witnesses described torture through prolonged beatings and electric shocks causing injuries including broken bones, broken teeth, severe burns, concussions, cuts and bruises. They also described being kept blindfolded and handcuffed for the entire duration of the detention, and being released only after having signed statements or recorded videos in which they pledge to cooperate or urge others to cooperate with the Russian forces. Ukrainian officials estimated that at least 600 people had been forcibly disappeared in the Kherson Oblast since the Russian invasion.

Teachers in Russian-occupied areas were forced by the military to teach in the Russian language and were tortured for using Ukrainian.

=== Russian torture chambers ===
==== Kyiv Oblast ====
On 4 April, the Office of the Prosecutor General of Ukraine stated police in the Kyiv Oblast found a "torture chamber" in the basement of a children's sanatorium in Bucha. The basement contained the bodies of five men with hands tied behind their backs. The announcement was accompanied by several photos posted on Facebook.

==== Sumy Oblast ====
In mid-April 2022 The Independent obtained two testimonies of survivors of a Russian torture chamber in Trostianets, Sumy Oblast. According to the witnesses, at least eight civilians were held in a basement of a train station, where they were tortured, starved, subject to mock executions, forced to sit in their own excrement, electrocuted, stripped, and threatened with rape and genital mutilation. At least one prisoner was beaten to death by Russian guards who told the prisoners "All Ukrainians must die". Two were still missing at the time of the report. One prisoner was given electric shocks to his head until he begged the Russian soldiers to kill him. Numerous bodies, mutilated to the point where they were unrecognizable, were discovered by investigators in the area around the town.

==== Kharkiv Oblast ====
After the successful Kharkiv counteroffensive by Ukraine which liberated a number of settlements and villages in the Kharkiv Oblast from Russian occupation, authorities discovered torture chambers which had been used by Russian troops during their time in control of the area.

In the town of Balakliia, which the Russians occupied for six months, forensics specialists, human rights activists, criminal law experts, and Ukrainian investigators found extensive evidence of war crimes and torture. During the Russian occupation, the troops used a two-story building named "BalDruk" (after a former publishing company which had an office there before the war) as a prison and a torture center. The Russians also used the police station building across the street for torture. Ukrainian officials say that around 40 people were held in the torture chambers during the occupation and subject to various forms of violence, including electrocution, beatings and mutilation. Two torture chambers specifically for children were also found in the city, one of the kids who had been held there described being cut with a knife, burnt with heated metal and subjected to mock executions.

Another Russian torture chamber was found in the liberated village of Kozacha Lopan, located at the local railway station. Ukrainian President Volodymyr Zelenskyy stated that more than ten torture chambers, along with mass graves, had been discovered in the Kharkiv areas liberated by Ukrainian troops. Zelenskyy also said: "As the occupiers fled they also dropped the torture devices". Kharkiv Regional Prosecutor's Office stated that "Representatives of the Russian Federation created a pseudo-law enforcement agency, in the basement of which a torture chamber was set up, where civilians were subjected to inhumane torture." Ukrainian prosecutors have opened investigations into Russia's use of torture chambers.

In Izium, journalists for the Associated Press found ten torture sites. An investigation found that both Ukrainian civilians and POWs were "routinely" subject to torture. At least eight men were killed while under torture.

Between late September and early October, Human Rights Watch interviewed over 100 residents of Izium. Almost all of them reported having family members or friends who had been tortured, and fifteen people said they had been tortured themselves; survivors described torture by administration of electric shocks, waterboarding, severe beatings, threats with firearms and being forced to hold stress positions for long periods. Residents stated that the Russians targeted specific individuals and that they already had lists of those locals who were in the military, the families of military people, or the people who were veterans of the war in Donbas. They also said that in selecting victims they would terrorize the townspeople by publicly strip searching them.

By October, no less than 10 torture sites had been identified in the town of approximately 46,000 inhabitants.

==== Zaporizhzhia Oblast ====
In July 2022, The Guardian reported on torture chambers in the Russian-occupied Zaporizhzhia Oblast based on the testimony of a 16-year-old boy who was held in one of them, beginning in April. The boy was arrested by Russian soldiers while trying to leave the occupied city of Melitopol because he had a video on his phone from social media, which featured Russian soldiers expressing defeatist attitudes towards Russia's invasion. He was held in a make shift prison in Vasylivka. According to his testimony, he saw rooms where torture took place, as well as bloodstains and soaked bandages, and heard the screams of the people being tortured. The torture involved electric shocks and beatings and could last for several hours.

==== Kherson Oblast ====
After the liberation of Kherson by Ukrainian forces from Russian occupation, Ukraine's human rights ombudsman Dmytro Lubinets said that investigators had discovered Russian torture chambers established especially for children. According to local testimony revealed by Lubinets, the children were denied food and given water only every other day, were told their parents had abandoned them and forced to clean up the blood resulting from torture in adjacent torture cells for adults. Lubinets reported that a total of ten torture chambers were discovered by Ukrainian investigators in Kherson Oblast, four of them in the city itself.

A Russian makeshift prison that functioned as an FSB torture chamber was discovered in the city, Ukrainian authorities estimated the number of people who had been imprisoned there at some point to be in the thousands. Among other instruments of torture, FSB officials used electric shocks against the victims.

== Use of human shields ==
The International Criminal Court classifies using civilians as a human shield as a grave violation of the Geneva Convention and thus a war crime. On 29 June, the Office of the United Nations High Commissioner for Human Rights expressed concern about Russian armed forces and pro-Russian armed groups as well as Ukrainian forces taking up positions close to civilian objects without taking measures for protecting the civilians. The human rights agency received reports of the use of human shields, which involves the deliberate use of civilians to render certain military objectives immune from attack.

=== Russia ===
ABC News and The Economist reported Russian soldiers using over 300 Ukrainian civilians as human shields in Yahidne from 3 to 31 March. Russian forces were using the village as a base to attack the nearby city of Chernihiv and had established a major military camp in the local school. For 28 days, 360 Ukrainian civilians, including 74 children and 5 persons with disabilities, were held captive in inhumane conditions in the basement of the school while the nearby areas were under attack by the Ukrainian forces. The basement was overcrowded, with no toilet facilities, water and ventilation. Ten elderly people died as a consequence of the poor detention conditions. Witness accounts report cases of torture and killings. According to the OHCHR what happened in the school of Yahidne suggests that the Russian armed forces were using civilians to render their base immune from military attacks while also subjecting them to inhuman and degrading treatment.

The BBC and The Guardian found "clear evidence" of the use of Ukrainian civilians as human shields by Russian troops in the area near Kyiv after the Russian withdrawal on 1 April, citing eyewitness accounts from inhabitants of Bucha and the nearby village of Ivankiv, and of residents of the village of Obukhovychi, near the Belarusian border, Russian troops were accused of using civilians as human shields as they came under attack by Ukrainian soldiers. Multiple witnesses reported that, on 14 March, the Russian soldiers went door-to-door, rounded about 150 civilians and locked them up in the local school, where they were used as protection for the Russian forces.

The United Nations Committee on the Rights of Persons with Disabilities said in September 2022 that it had received reports of disabled people being used as "human shields" by Russian armed forces.

In October 2026, the Ukrainian military provided alleged drone footage of Russian forces in Kupiansk leading a group of a child, two women and several men toward a gas pipe, using them as human shields. The group came under fire, resulting in civilian casualties, with the Ukrainian military saying it had not opened fire and the impact patterns indicating the shelling originating from Russian positions, potentially to falsely accuse Ukraine of targeting civilians.

=== Ukraine ===
Since the beginning of the invasion, Russia has repeatedly accused Ukraine of using human shields, a claim which has been rejected by scholars Michael N. Schmitt, Neve Gordon, and Nicola Perugini as an attempt to shift blame for civilian deaths to Ukraine.

== Sexual violence ==
According to experts and Ukrainian officials, there are indications that sexual violence was tolerated by the Russian command and used in a systematic way as a weapon of war. After the Russian withdrawal from areas north of Kyiv, there was "a mounting body of evidence" of rape, torture and summary killings by Russian forces inflicted upon Ukrainian civilians, including gang rapes committed at gunpoint and rapes committed in front of children.

In March 2022, the UN Human Rights Monitoring Mission in Ukraine stressed the heightened risks of sexual violence and the risk of under-reporting by victims in the country. At the beginning of June, the Monitoring Mission received reports of 124 episodes of conflict-related sexual violence committed against women, girls, men and boys in various Ukrainian cities and regions. The alleged perpetrators were from the ranks of Russian and pro-Russian separatist armed forces in 89 cases and from civilians or unidentified individuals in territory controlled by Russian armed forces in 2 cases.

In late March, Ukraine's Prosecutor General opened an investigation into a case of a Russian soldier who was accused of killing an unarmed civilian and then repeatedly raping the dead man's wife. The incident allegedly took place on 9 March in Shevchenkove, a village outside of Kyiv. The wife related that two Russian soldiers raped her repeatedly after killing her husband and the family's dog while her four-year-old son hid in the house's boiler room. The account was first published by The Times of London. Russian spokesperson Dmitry Peskov dismissed the allegation as a lie. Ukrainian authorities have said that numerous reports of sexual assault and rape by Russian troops have emerged since the beginning of the invasion in February 2022. Ukrainian MP Maria Mezentseva said that these types of cases were underreported and that there are many other victims. Meduza published an in-depth account of the same case in Bogdanivka and of other events.

In another reported incident, a Russian soldier entered a school in the village of Mala Rohan where civilians were sheltering and raped a young Ukrainian woman. Human Rights Watch reported that the woman was threatened and repeatedly raped by a Russian soldier who cut her cheek, neck and hair. According to witness statements, the villagers informed Russian officers in charge of the occupation of the village of the incident, who arrested the perpetrator and told them that he would be summarily executed. Ukrainian Foreign Minister Dmytro Kuleba stated that Russian soldiers had committed "numerous" rapes against Ukrainian women. According to the Sexual Violence in Armed Conflict database, sexual violence by Russian forces has been reported in three of seven years of conflict since 2014 in eastern Ukraine.

A report published by The Kyiv Independent included a photo and information about one man and two or three naked women under a blanket whose bodies Russian soldiers tried to burn on the side of a road before fleeing. Ukrainian officials said the women had been raped and the bodies burnt. Human Rights Watch received reports of other incidents of rape in Chernihiv Oblast and Mariupol. ABC News reported in April 2022 that "rapes, shootings and a senseless execution" have occurred in the village of Berestianka near Kyiv, noting a specific incident where a man was reportedly shot by Russian soldiers on 9 March after attempting to block them from raping his wife and a female friend.

On 12 April 2022, BBC News interviewed a 50-year-old woman from a village 70 km west of Kyiv, who said that she was raped at gunpoint by a Chechen allied with the Russian Armed Forces. A 40-year-old woman was raped and killed by the same soldier, according to neighbours, leaving what BBC News described as a "disturbing crime scene". Police exhumed the 40-year-old's body the day after the visit by BBC News. A report by The New York Times related that a Ukrainian woman was kidnapped by Russian soldiers, kept in a cellar as a sex slave and then executed. On 3 June, the United Nations Special Representative on Sexual Violence in Conflict, Pramila Patten, told the U.N. Security Council that dozens of violent sexual attacks against women and girls have been reported to the U.N. human rights office, and many more cases likely have not been reported. She also said the country is turning into "a human trafficking crisis."

As of 5 July 2022, the UN Human Rights Monitoring Mission in Ukraine had verified 28 cases of conflict-related sexual violence, including rape, gang rape, torture, forced public stripping, and threats of sexual violence. OHCHR reported that 11 cases, including rape and gang rape, were committed by Russian armed forces and law enforcement. In addition, due to the limited communication, especially with areas under Russian or separatist control (such as Mariupol) and contested cities, a major barrier to verification of cases remains access, the exact number of sexual violence cases has been difficult to track or respond to in a timely manner. Reports of sexual violence have been reported to Ukrainian and international authorities, law enforcement officials and media personnel as Russian troops have withdrawn.

A 52-year-old woman was taken by Russian soldiers in occupied Izium and repeatedly raped while her husband was beaten. She, along with her husband, was arrested on 1 July and was taken to a small shed which served as a torture room. The Russian soldiers put bags over their heads and threatened them, afterwards, they forcibly undressed her, groped her, and told her that they would send photos of the activity to her family members to humiliate her and them. The woman was then raped repeatedly by the commander of the unit for the next three days, while simultaneously the other Russian soldiers beat her husband in a nearby garage. The rapist would then describe the assault to the husband. She attempted suicide by hanging, but failed. Subsequently, the Russian soldiers tortured her with electric shocks and humiliated her. The Russian commander also obtained the woman's bank number and stole the funds out of her account. The woman and her husband were released on 10 July when they were dumped blindfolded by the Russians at a nearby gas station. They managed to escape to Ukrainian territory, and, after Izium was liberated in September, returned home.

In late September 2022, a panel of investigators from the Independent International Commission of Inquiry on Ukraine released a statement which said that the commission has "documented cases in which children have been raped, tortured, and unlawfully confined" and labeled these as war crimes. The same report also referenced children being killed and injured by Russia's indiscriminate attacks as well as forced separation from family and kidnapping.

Doctors at a maternity clinic in Poltava reported cases of women who had been raped by Russian soldiers and then had window sealant injected into their sexual organs so that they could never have children.

== Looting ==
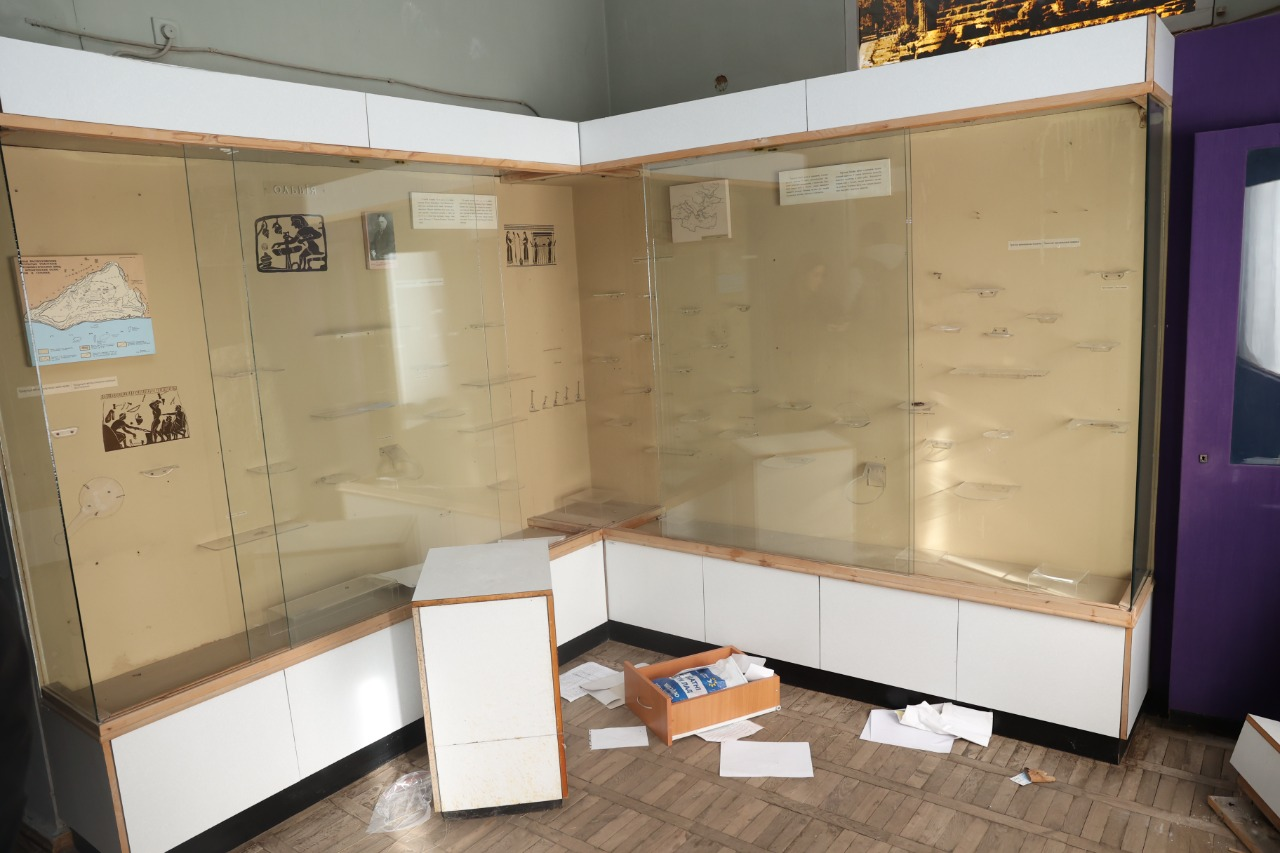
Kherson Local History Museum after being looted by Russian troops

Looting is a war crime under several treaties. Survivors of the Bucha massacre, talking to Human Rights Watch (HRW) following the retreat of the Russian forces, described the treatment of people in the city during the occupation: Russian soldiers went door to door, questioning people and destroying their possessions. They also said that Russian soldiers looted the town, and took clothing, jewelry, electronics, kitchen appliances and vehicles of evacuees, the deceased, and those still in the city. Wall Street Journal journalist Yaroslav Trofimov reported hearing of Russian soldiers looting food and valuables during his visit to southern Ukraine. The Guardian journalists visiting Trostianets after a month-long Russian occupation found evidence of "systematic looting". Similarly, villagers in Berestianka near Kyiv told ABC News that before the village returned to Ukrainian control, Russian soldiers looted clothes, household appliances and electronics from homes.

Videos have been posted on Telegram, reportedly showing Russian soldiers sending stolen Ukrainian goods home through courier services in Belarus. Items visible in videos included air conditioning units, alcohol, car batteries, and bags from Epicentr K stores. News aggregator Ukraine Alert posted video showing stolen goods found in an abandoned Russian armored personnel carrier, and an image reportedly showing a damaged Russian military truck carrying three washing machines. Intercepted telephone calls have also made mention of looting; a call by a Russian soldier released by the Security Service of Ukraine included the soldier telling his girlfriend: "I stole some cosmetics for you" to which the girlfriend responded "What Russian person doesn't steal anything?" Voice of America obtained photos indicating that Russian troops looted hazardous materials from the Chernobyl nuclear power plant, and an image from Belarus apparently showing a Russian military truck parked outside the local CDEK office adding to the evidence of Russian troops mailing looted goods home.

There were reports of bazaars set up by Russian forces in Belarus to trade in looted goods, such items as "washing machines and dishwashers, refrigerators, jewelry, cars, bicycles, motorcycles, dishes, carpets, works of art, children's toys, cosmetics". Russian soldiers sought payment in euros and US dollars, however, and due to currency restrictions this was difficult for locals.

Widespread claims of looting and other damage by Russian troops to cultural institutions were raised by Ukrainian officials with a majority of the accusations coming from the areas of Mariupol and Melitopol. Ukrainian officials claimed that Russian forces seized more than 2,000 artworks and Scythian gold from various museums and moved them into the Donbas region. Experts in Ukraine and elsewhere who track Russian looting and destruction of cultural heritage in Ukraine cite evidence that state-sponsored and systematic conducted by specialists began with the invasion of Crimea in 2014.

== Forced conscription ==
At the end of February 2022., Ukrainian civilians were reportedly forced to join the pro-Russian separatist forces in the self-proclaimed Luhansk and Donetsk people's republics. The Office of the United Nations High Commissioner for Human Rights documented cases of people forcefully taken to assembly points where they were recruited and immediately sent to the front line. They were men working in the public sector, including schools, and also people stopped on the street by representatives of local "commissariats". As recalled by the OHCHR, compelling civilians to serve in armed groups affiliated with a hostile power may constitute a serious breach of the laws and customs of international humanitarian law, and it constitutes a war crime under Article 8 of the Rome Statute of the ICC. The OHCHR also expressed concern about the case of some forced conscripts who have been prosecuted by Ukrainian authorities notwithstanding their combatant immunity under the law of armed conflict.

== Mistreatment of prisoners of war and desecration ==
As of November 2022, the UN Human Rights Monitoring Mission in Ukraine (HRMMU) conducted 159 interviews with prisoners of war held by the Russian and Russian-affiliated forces, and 175 interviews with prisoners of war held by Ukraine. The vast majority of Ukrainian prisoners reported that they had been held in dire conditions of internment and subjected to torture and ill-treatment, including beatings, threats, mock executions, electric and positional torture. Several women prisoners were threatened with sexual violence and subjected to degrading treatments and enforced nudity. The UN agency also collected information about nine possible cases of death during the "admission procedures" to the internment camps. Russian prisoners of war made credible allegations of summary executions, torture and ill-treatment by members of the Ukrainian forces. In several cases Russian prisoners were stabbed and subjected to electric torture. Ukraine launched criminal investigations into allegations of mistreatment of prisoners of war.

In October 2024, following Russian marines from the 155th Naval Infantry Brigade executing nine Ukrainian prisoners rather than taking them captive as dictated by international law, Ukrainian authorities said that Russian forces had executed more than 100 surrendering Ukrainians during the invasion, most of them in 2024. Forbes described the incident as ″the latest in an escalating campaign of terror by Russian troops″.

=== Mistreatment of Ukrainian POWs ===
As of 31 July 2022, OHCHR said that of 35 interviewed, 27 Ukrainian prisoners of war had been tortured by Russian and pro-Russian armed forces or policemen. Victims reported being punched, kicked, beaten with police batons and wooden hammers, electrocuted, threatened with execution or sexual violence, and shot in the legs. OHCHR had also received information about the deaths of two Ukrainian prisoners as a result of torture, one beaten and electrocuted on 9 May at the Melitopol airfield, the other beat to death at the Volnovakha penal colony near Olenivka, Donetsk Oblast, on 17 April.

==== Execution of surrendering Ukrainian soldiers ====
As of December 2025, since 24 February 2022, the UN had verified the executions of 96 Ukrainian prisoners, while it found another 119 allegations of executions ″credible″. In the same time frame, the Prosecutor General of Ukraine office had pursued 103 criminal proceedings relating to the killings of 333 Ukrainian soldiers who had surrendered or laid down arms. According to Oleksandra Matviichuk, head of the Center for Civil Liberties and 2022 Nobel Peace Prize laureate, executing prisoners of war is one of Russia's tactics in its objective to ″break″ the Ukrainian population. A total of 41 member states of the Organization for Security and Co-operation in Europe launched an investigation by experts on the ground in July 2025, and in its report in September 2025, it noted significant difficulties due to Russia's lack of cooperation and transparency, but concluded that several elements indicate that the executions are a regular occurrence.

Eyewitness accounts and a security camera video show that on 4 March 2022 Russian paratroopers executed at least eight Ukrainian prisoners of war in Bucha. The victims were local inhabitants joined the defense forces shortly before they were killed.

In 2024, Russian executions of Ukrainian prisoners was reported to be increasing in frequency, with at least 177 prisoners dying in Russian captivity since the beginning of the war. On 1 October, 16 prisoners of war were reportedly executed by Russia in Donetsk oblast following their surrender. On 10 October, nine more Ukrainian prisoners were reportedly shot by Russian soldiers in Kursk after being stripped down to their underwear and being forced to lay face down before being shot in their heads, with imagery from a drone seemingly confirming the mass execution.

On 23 January 2025, Ukraine's Prosecutor General's Office opened a criminal case against Russia for war crimes, it was opened following a video emerging showing Russian soldiers executing six unarmed Ukrainian prisoners of war in Donetsk Oblast.

On 6 November 2025, a Russian soldier accused of executing a surrendering Ukrainian soldier at point blank range was sentenced to life in prison by a Zaporizhzhia court.

On 5 December 2025, Russian troops reportedly shot and killed a Ukrainian soldier as he was surrendering, leading to a pre-trial war crime investigation by the Donetsk Regional Prosecutor's Office being launched.

==== Torture and castration of Ukrainian prisoners ====
In June 2023 The Times reported on two former Ukrainian soldiers who had been tortured by Russians while in captivity and castrated with a knife, before being freed in a prisoner of war swap. A psychologist who was treating the men reported that she had heard of many other similar cases from her colleagues.

In February 2026, journalists at Radio Free Europe/Radio Liberty published an investigation which included private correspondence of the Russian general Roman Demurchiev, which included him boasting to close contacts and other members of the military about executing, torturing, and desecrating bodies of Ukrainian soldiers, including POWs. According to Meduza, the archive also revealed the complicity of Demurchiev's superiors.

==== Illegal trials of Ukrainian prisoners ====
Russia has prosecuted multiple Ukrainian prisoners for being members of the Azov Brigade, which it considers a terrorist organisation. Human Rights Watch noted that as the defendants' alleged actions were not illegal in the time and place they were committed, such prosecutions violated the Third Geneva Convention on the Treatment of Prisoners of War, as they appeared to be retaliation against the prisoners for their participation in the defence of Ukraine.

==== Death sentence against foreign soldiers serving in the Ukrainian armed forces ====
Following a trial by the Supreme Court of the Donetsk People's Republic, three foreign-born members of the Ukrainian armed forces, Aiden Aslin, Shaun Pinner, and Brahim Saadoun were declared mercenaries and sentenced to execution by firing squad. Aslin and Pinner, originally from England, had been serving in the Ukrainian military since 2018, while Saadoun had come in 2019 from Morocco to study in Kyiv, having enlisted in November 2021. The ruling was described as illegal because the defendants qualify as prisoners of war under the Geneva Conventions and have not been accused of committing any war crimes.

On 10 June 2022 the Office of the United Nations High Commissioner for Human Rights condemned the death sentences and the trial. A spokesperson of the organisation declared that "such trials against prisoners of war amount to a war crime", and highlighted that according to the chief command of Ukraine, all the defendants were part of the Ukrainian armed forces and therefore should not have been considered mercenaries. The OHCHR spokesperson also expressed concern about procedural fairness, stating that "since 2015, we have observed that the so-called judiciary within these self-contained republics has not complied with essential fair trial guarantees, such as public hearings, independence, impartiality of the courts and the right not to be compelled to testify".

The International Bar Association issued a statement saying "that any implementation of the 'pronounced' death penalty will be an obvious case of plain murder of Aiden Aslin, Shaun Pinner and Brahim Saaudun and deemed an international war crime. Any perpetrators (anyone engaged in the so-called DPR 'court' and anyone who conspired to execute this decision) will be regarded as war criminals", also pointing out that neither Russian nor Ukrainian law allows the death penalty.

On 12 June, Donetsk People's Republic leader Denis Pushilin reiterated that the separatists did not see the trio as prisoners of war, but rather as people who came to Ukraine to kill civilians for money, adding that he saw no reason to modify or mitigate the sentences. Russian State Duma Chairman Vyacheslav Volodin accused the trio of fascism, reiterating that they deserved the death penalty. He added that the Ukrainian armed forces were committing crimes against humanity and were being controlled by a neo-Nazi regime in Kyiv.

On 17 June, the European Court of Human Rights issued an emergency stay of Saadoun Brahim's execution. It stressed that Russia was still obliged to follow the court's rulings. Earlier in June, the Russian State Duma passed a law to end the jurisdiction of the court in Russia, but it had not yet been signed into law.

On 8 July the DPR lifted a moratorium on the death penalty. On 21 September five British citizens held by pro-Russian separatists were released, including those sentenced to death, and also the Moroccan citizen Saadoun Brahim was freed after a prisoner exchange between Ukraine and Russia.

==== Execution of Oleksandr Matsievskyi ====
In early March 2023 a video emerged showing the execution of an unarmed Ukrainian POW who is murdered after he says "Glory to Ukraine", while smoking a cigarette. The Russian officer in charge of the prisoner (off camera) shouts "Die Bitch!" and fires multiple rounds from a machine gun into him. The President of Ukraine's office called the execution a "brutal murder".

==== Torture of captured Ukrainian soldiers ====
On 22 July 2022, Human Rights Watch documented the torture of three Ukrainian prisoners of war, members of the Territorial Defense Forces, and the death of two of them in the occupied areas of Kherson and Zaporizhzhia oblasts.

In May 2026, deputy commander of the 1st Corps of the Ukrainian National Guard Azov, Sviatoslav Palamar, said that a member of the unit's body had been returned during a repatriation program, where a forensic examination determined fractured ribs and blunt trauma to the chest as the cause of death, indicating that he had been tortured in captivity. Palamar called the case ″another indictment of the international humanitarian law system, which is unable to protect the health and lives of Ukrainian prisoners of war held in Russian captivity″ and urged Ukrainian officials to raise such cases at the UN, the Council of Europe, and the OSCE.

==== Castration and murder of a Ukrainian POW in Pryvillia ====
On 28 July 2022, a video was posted on Russian social media which shows a Russian soldier castrating a Ukrainian prisoner of war, who is tied up and gagged, with a box cutter. On the next day, a continuation video was posted with possibly the same soldiers where they taped the POW's mouth with black tape, placed his head in front of his cut genitals, and shot him in the head. After that, the Russian soldiers started grabbing the POW's corpse with ropes connected to his legs.

On 5 August, the Bellingcat group reported that the videos were geolocated to the Pryvillia Sanatorium, located in Pryvillia, Luhansk Oblast, and interviewed the apparent perpetrator by telephone. A white car marked with a Z – a designation marking Russian military vehicles and a militarist symbol used in Russian propaganda – can also be seen in the video; the same car can also be seen in earlier, official videos released by Russian channels, of the Akhmat fighters at the Azot plant during the Russian capture of Sieverodonetsk. Pryvillia had been captured and occupied by Russians since early July. Bellingcat identified the soldiers involved, including the main perpetrator (an inhabitant of Tuva), who wore a distinctive wide brimmed black hat, as members of the Akhmat unit, a Chechen Kadyrovite paramilitary formation fighting for the Russians in the war in Ukraine. The investigation also indicated that the video contained no evidence of tampering or editing.

==== Beheading and mutilations ====
In April 2023, two videos surfaced which appeared to show beheaded and mutilated Ukrainian soldiers. One video purportedly filmed by Wagner Group mercenaries showed the bodies of two Ukrainian soldiers next to a destroyed military vehicle, their heads and hands missing, with a voice commenting in Russian in the background. The second video appeared to show Russian soldiers decapitating a Ukrainian prisoner of war using a knife. The U.N. Human Rights Monitoring Mission in Ukraine said that "Regrettably, this is not an isolated incident." In May 2026, Ukraine's General Staff said that a Russian commander ordered the beheading of the bodies of two Ukrainian soldiers killed near Huliaipole and for them to be put on display.

==== Perfidy ====
During the Pokrovsk offensive, soldiers of the 68th Jaeger Brigade reported that Russian troops were disguising themselves as civilians to carry out sabotage and reconnaissance, as well as ambush Ukrainian troops, actions regarded as perfidy and considered a war crime under international law.

=== Mistreatment of Russian POWs ===
==== Torture of Russian POWs in Mala Rohan ====
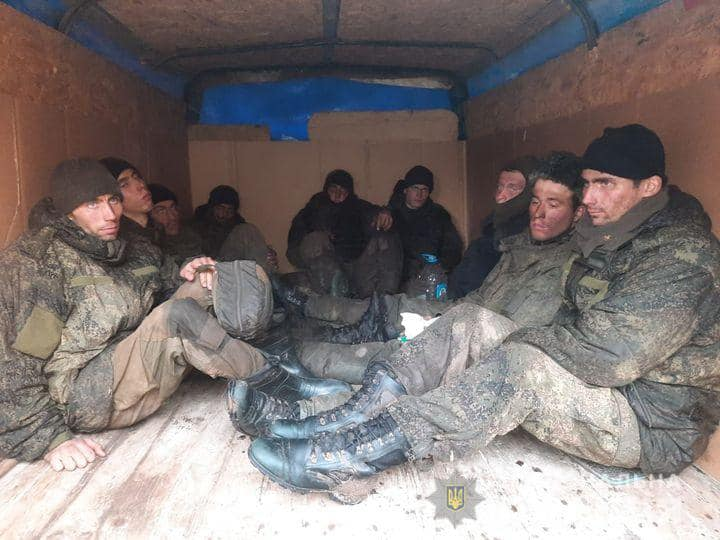
Captured Russian soldiers during the Battle of Sumy.

According to a report by the UN High Commissioner for Human Rights (OHCHR), members of Ukrainian armed forces shot the legs of three captured Russian soldiers and tortured Russian soldiers who were wounded. The incident is likely to have occurred on the evening of 25 March 2022 in Mala Rohan, south-east of Kharkiv, in an area recently recaptured by Ukrainian troops, and was first reported following the publication on social media accounts of a video of unknown authorship between 27 and 28 March. One of the video's versions depicts a number of soldiers lying on the ground; many appear to be bleeding from leg wounds. Three prisoners are brought out of a vehicle and shot in the leg by someone off-camera.

==== Alleged execution of captured Russian soldiers ====
On 6 April 2022 a video allegedly showing Ukrainian troops of the Georgian Legion executing captured Russian soldiers was posted on Telegram. The video was verified by The New York Times and by Reuters. A wounded Russian soldier was seemingly shot twice by a Ukrainian soldier while lying on the ground. Three dead Russian soldiers, including one with a head wound and hands tied behind his back, were shown near the soldier. The video appeared to have been filmed on a road north of the village of Dmytrivka, seven miles south of Bucha. Ukrainian authorities promised an investigation.

In 2024, The New York Times published an account by a German volunteer, according to it Russian POWs and surrendering soldiers were killed by members of a foreign volunteer unit called the Chosen Company.

==== Disputed surrender of Russian soldiers in Makiivka ====
On 12 November 2022, a video appeared on pro-Ukrainian websites showing the bodies of soldiers in Russian uniforms lying on the ground in a farmyard in the Makiivka area. On 17 November, more footage emerged, taken from the ground by a person at the scene. The video shows the Russian soldiers as they exit a building, surrender, and lay face down on the ground. Then another Russian soldier emerges from the same building and opens fire on the Ukrainian soldiers who are surprised. An aerial video from the site documents the aftermath, with at least 12 bodies of Russian soldiers, most positioned as they were when they surrendered, bleeding from gunshot wounds to the head.

The authenticity of the videos was verified by The New York Times. Russia and Ukraine accused each other of war crimes, with Russia accusing Ukraine of "mercilessly shooting unarmed Russian P.O.W.s," and Ukraine accusing the Russians of opening fire while surrendering. Ukraine's officials said the Prosecutor General's office would investigate the video footage as the incident may qualify as a crime of "perfidy" committed by the Russian troops in feigning surrender. On 25 November the UN High Commissioner for Human Rights Volker Türk said "Our Monitoring Mission in Ukraine has conducted a preliminary analysis indicating that these disturbing videos are highly likely to be authentic in what they show" and called on the Ukrainian authorities to investigate the allegations of summary executions of Russian prisoners of war "in a manner that is – and is seen to be – independent, impartial, thorough, transparent, prompt and effective."

== Russian strikes on humanitarian aid ==
Russia has been accused of deliberately targeting humanitarian aid workers and infrastructure, including by the United Nations. According to the United Nations World Food Programme representative Richard Ragan in May 2026, 84 incidents affecting humanitarian assets had been recorded in the last 18 months. The WFP said that a Russian Iskander ballistic missile destroyed a warehouse storing humanitarian food aid for 130,000 people on 25 May, emphasizing that strikes on humanitarian infrastructure is prohibited under international humanitarian law.

== Genocide ==
Several national parliaments, including those of Ukraine, Canada, Poland, Estonia, Latvia, Lithuania, Czech Republic, and Ireland declared that the invasion was genocide. Genocide scholars like Eugene Finkel, Timothy D. Snyder, Norman M. Naimark and Gregory Stanton, and legal experts Otto Luchterhandt and Zakhar Tropin said that the definition required certain acts and also genocidal intent, to establish genocide. A report by 30 scholars concluded that Russia is guilty of inciting genocide in Ukraine by committing acts prohibited by the Genocide Convention. The report further stated that a serious risk of more genocide exists, triggering an obligation for foreign parties to take action.

== Documenting war crimes ==
Amnesty International documented war crimes and crimes against humanity perpetrated by Russian forces, including attacks on civilians and civilian infrastructure, indiscriminate attacks, extrajudicial killings, enforced disappearances, torture, arbitrary arrest and detention, forcible transfer and deportation, and other ill-treatment of civilians and prisoners of war. Russian attacks on Ukrainian energy infrastructure "indispensable to the survival of the civilian population" during winters were also categorized as war crimes aimed at causing suffering of civilian population. Human Rights Watch documented Russian war crimes and crimes against humanity consisting of attacks on civilians, indiscriminate attacks, summary executions, enforced disappearances, sexual violence, forcible transfer and deportation, torture, arbitrary arrest and detention, inhumane treatment, terror, looting of cultural artifacts, forced labor, forcible conscription of Ukrainian civilians in Russian-occupied territories enlisted to fight against their own country, and Russia, as an occupying power, transferring its own civilian population into the territory it occupies (Ukraine).

The Office of the United Nations High Commissioner for Human Rights (OHCHR) documented Russian war crimes and crimes against humanity consisting of enforced disappearances, torture, killings, murder of civilians and summary executions of POWs, rape and sexual violence, forcible displacement or deportation, attacks against civilians and civilian objects; cruel, inhuman or degrading treatment; inhumane acts; as well as trafficking men from different countries into the Russian armed forces through deception, in violation of international human rights law.

The International Criminal Court (ICC) prosecutors have issued warrants for Vladimir Putin and a Russian official responsible for adoptions in connection with the abduction of Ukrainian children into Russia. Investigators have submitted evidence of many breaches of the Geneva Convention in Russia's war in Ukraine.

Moscow has denied any involvement in war crimes, a response Vittorio Bufacchi of University College Cork says "has bordered on the farcical," and its contention that the images coming out of Bucha were fabricated "a disingenuous response born by delusional hubris, post-truth on overdrive, (that) does not merit to be taken seriously." Even the usually fractured United States Senate came together to call Putin a war criminal. One of several efforts to document Russian war crimes concerns its repeated bombardment of markets and bread lines, destruction of basic infrastructure and attacks on exports and supply convoys, in a country where deliberate starvation of Ukrainians by Soviets the Holodomor still looms large in public memory. Forcible deportation of populations, such as took place in Mariuopol, is another area of focus, since "(f)orced deportations and transfers are defined both as war crimes under the Fourth Geneva Convention and Additional Protocol II and Article 8 of the Rome Statute—and as crimes against humanity—under Article 7 of the Rome Statute. As both war crimes and crimes against humanity, they have several mechanisms for individual accountability, the International Criminal Court and also, at the individual state level, under universal jurisdiction and Magnitsky sanctions legislation.

== National legal proceedings ==
=== Ukraine ===
The Ukrainian foreign minister Dmytro Kuleba stated on 25 February that Russia was committing war crimes, and that the ministry and the Prosecutor General of Ukraine were collecting evidence on events including attacks on kindergartens and orphanages, which would be "immediately transfer[red]" to the ICC. On 30 March, Ukraine's chief prosecutor announced that she was building 2,500 war crimes cases against the Russian invasion. On 13 May the first war crimes trial began in Kyiv, of a Russian soldier who was ordered to shoot an unarmed civilian. The soldier, Vadim Shishimarin, soon pleaded guilty to this crime. Shortly after Shishimarin pleaded guilty, two other low-ranked Russian soldiers, Alexander Bobikin and Alexander Ivanov, were tried on war crimes charges for firing missiles at a residential tower block in Kharkiv. They also pleaded guilty.

Several international legal teams were formed to support the Ukrainian prosecutors.

As of February 2024, Ukrainian authorities reported that they had identified 511 potential war criminals and convicted 81, although the majority of the convictions occurred without the suspect being in custody.

EU Joint Investigation Team

In the aftermath of the Bucha massacre, the EU established a Joint Investigation Team (JIT) with Ukraine to investigate war crimes and crimes against humanity. Within the framework of the Joint Investigation Team, a pool of investigators and legal experts by Eurojust and Europol is made available for providing assistance to Ukrainian prosecutors. On 6 April 2022, United States Attorney General Merrick Garland announced that the U.S. Department of Justice was assisting Eurojust and Europol prosecutors with their investigation, and that the Justice and State Departments were also making efforts to support the Ukrainian prosecutor.

In April 2023, the Eurojust JIT agreed to add the crime of genocide to their war crimes investigation in Ukraine.

Task Force on Accountability for Crimes Committed in Ukraine

In late March 2022, the Task Force on Accountability for Crimes Committed in Ukraine, a pro bono international group of lawyers, was created to help Ukrainian prosecutors coordinate legal cases for war crimes and other crimes related to the 2022 Russian invasion of Ukraine.

Atrocity Crimes Advisory Group

On 25 May 2022, the EU, US, and the UK announced the creation of the Atrocity Crimes Advisory Group (ACA) to help coordinate their investigations and to support the War Crimes Units of the Office of the Prosecutor General of Ukraine (OPG).

=== Russia ===
As of February 2023, Russia claimed to have charged 680 Ukrainians with war crimes, including 118 soldiers and Defence Ministry officials. The Investigative Committee of Russia told TASS that it had opened over two thousand criminal cases since the start of the Russo–Ukrainian War in 2014, including for crimes committed during the invasion of Ukraine. The first criminal case against a Ukrainian serviceman was that of Anton Cherednik, a Marine accused of murder, terrorism and cruel treatment of civilians. Cherednik was sentenced to nineteen years' imprisonment in November 2023; at the time of his sentencing, cases were reportedly pending against 42 other Ukrainian prisoners.

Occupied territories

The Kyiv Post reported in November 2023 that Russian-controlled courts in occupied areas of Ukraine had convicted multiple Ukrainian soldiers of war crimes.

=== Other countries ===
Several states, including Estonia, Germany, Latvia, Lithuania, Norway, Poland, Slovakia, Spain, and Sweden, announced in March and April 2022 that they would conduct investigations of war crimes in the 2022 Russian invasion of Ukraine under the universal jurisdiction principle of international humanitarian law.

On 5 December 2023, US Attorney-General Merrick B. Garland announced war crime charges against four Russian-affiliated military personnel accused of the abduction and torture of an American citizen in Ukraine: Russian military commanders Suren Seiranovich Mkrtchyan and Dmitry Budnik and two lower-ranking officers identified as Valeri and Nazar (both last names unknown).

== International legal proceedings ==
International courts that have jurisdiction over cases originating from the Russian invasion of Ukraine include the International Criminal Court, the International Court of Justice and the European Court of Human Rights.

Because of the backload of cases in Ukrainian courts, which as of June 2022 have more than 15,000 pending cases, and the number of international bodies and foreign countries cooperating in the investigations of war crimes in Ukraine, there were calls to create a special hybrid court to centralize domestic and international efforts. In May, the idea of establishing a special international tribunal was formally endorsed by a group of members of the European Parliament. The establishment of a special tribunal within the framework of the United Nations could be hampered by Russia's position as a permanent member of the Security Council and by the difficulty of gathering the necessary two-thirds majority in the General Assembly.

=== International Criminal Court ===
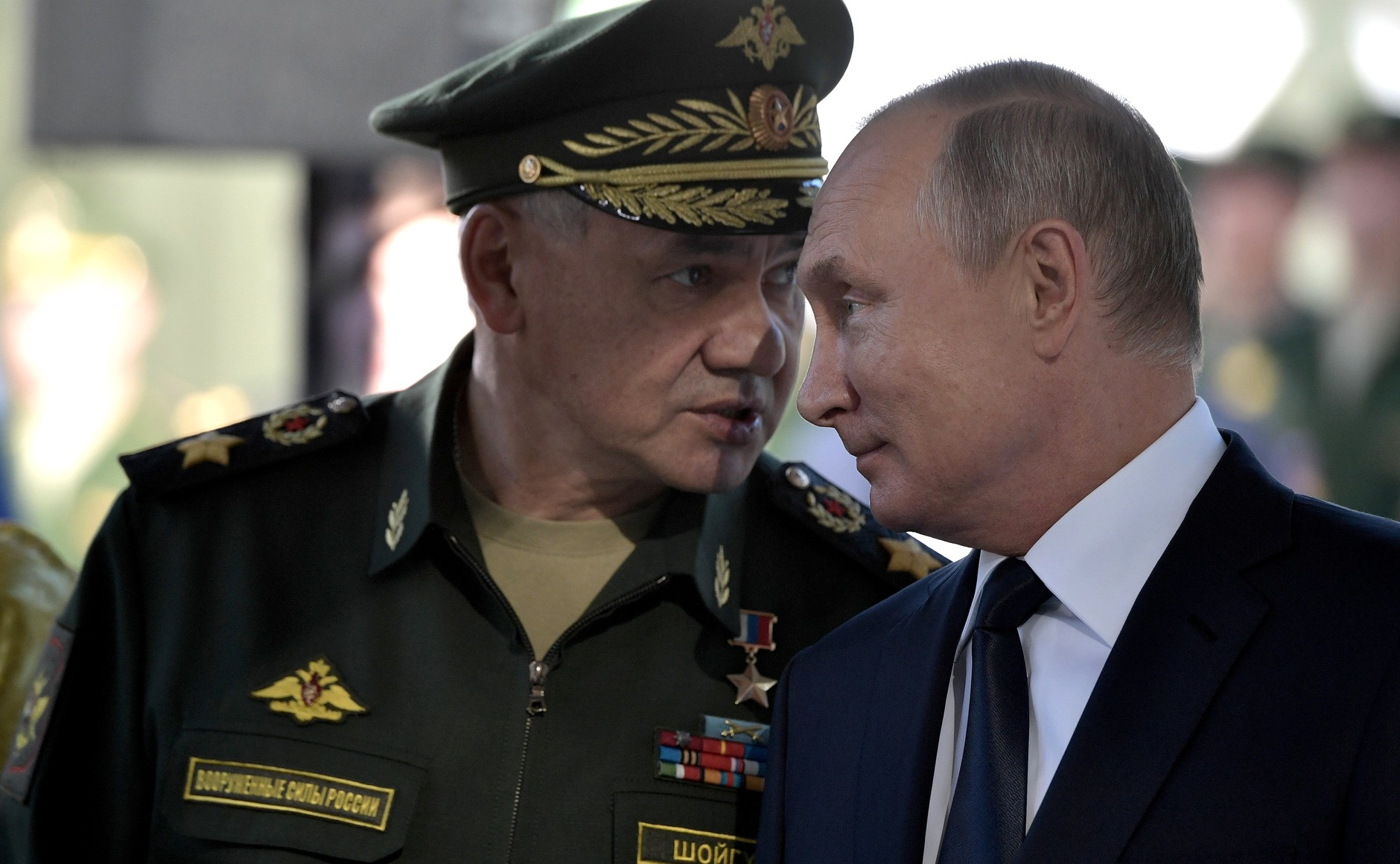
Arrest warrants for war crimes were issued by the ICC against Russian President Vladimir Putin (right) and Russian Defense Minister Sergei Shoigu (left).

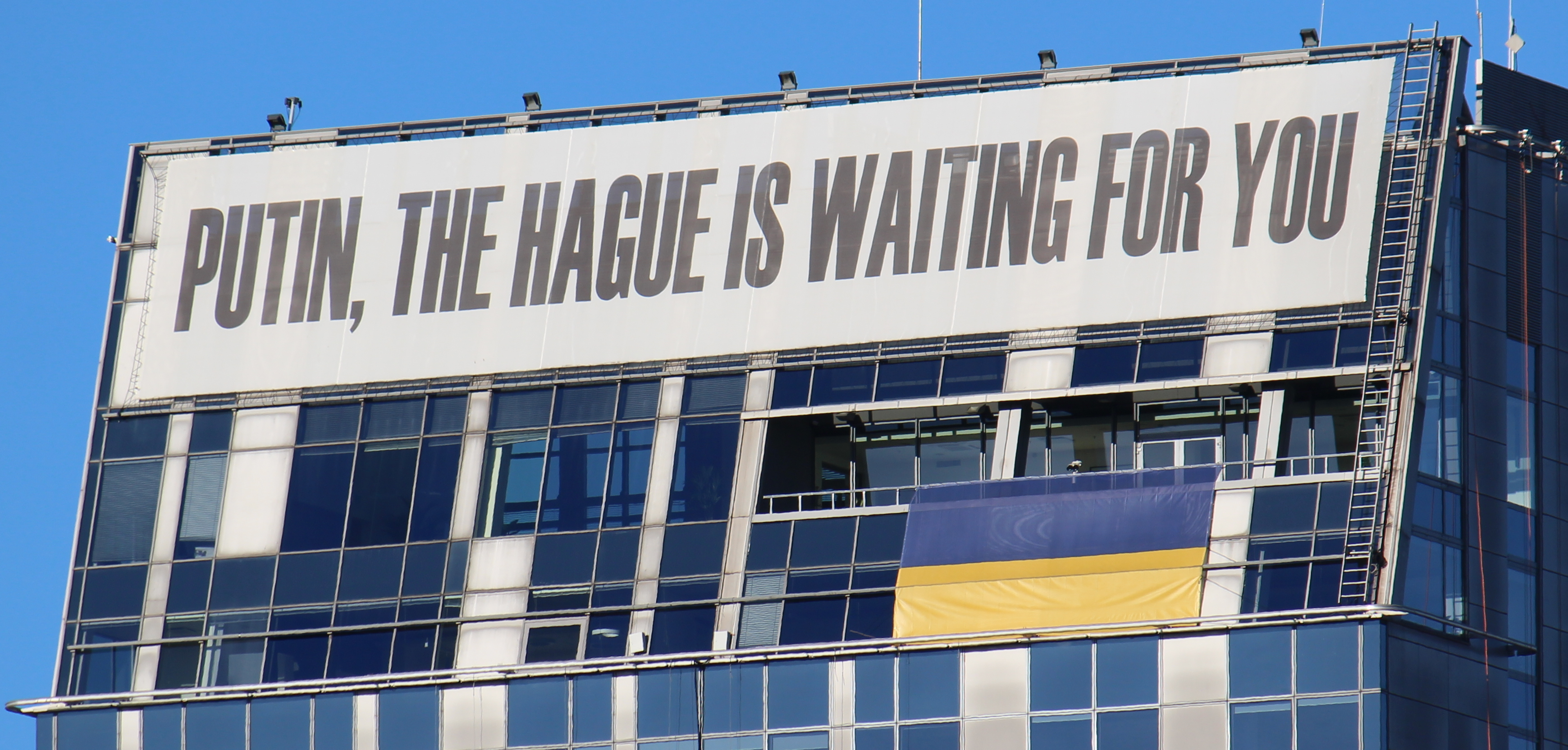
A "Putin, the Hague is waiting for you" banner was displayed on the Vilnius City Municipality Building

On 25 February 2022, ICC Prosecutor Karim Ahmad Khan stated that the ICC could "exercise its jurisdiction and investigate any act of genocide, crime against humanity or war crime committed within Ukraine." Khan stated on 28 February that he would launch a full ICC investigation and that he had requested his team to "explore all evidence preservation opportunities". He stated that it would be faster to officially open the investigation if an ICC member state referred the case for investigation. Lithuanian prime minister Ingrida Simonyte stated on the same day that Lithuania had requested that the ICC investigation be opened.

On 2 March 2022, 39 states had already referred the situation in Ukraine to the ICC Prosecutor, who could then open an investigation into past and present allegations of war crimes, crimes against humanity or genocide committed in Ukraine by any person from 21 November 2013 onwards. On 11 March two additional referrals were submitted to the ICC Prosecutor, and the Prosecutor declared that investigations would begin. The Prosecutor's office set up an online method for people with evidence to initiate contact with investigators, and a team of investigators, lawyers and other professionals was sent to Ukraine to begin collecting evidence.

Neither Ukraine nor Russia is party to the Rome Statute, the legal basis of the ICC. The ICC has jurisdiction to investigate because Ukraine signed two declarations consenting to ICC jurisdiction over crimes committed in Ukraine from 21 November 2013 onwards. Articles 28(a) and 28(b) of the Rome Statute define the relation between command responsibility and superior responsibility of the chain of command structures of the armed forces involved.

As of 10 June, the ICC investigation had dispatched more than 40 investigators, the largest effort ever in ICC history, and there are calls to create a special court or international tribunal to handle the casework.

In mid-June, according to the Dutch General Intelligence and Security Service, an alleged GRU officer, who was a student of prominent genocide professor Eugene Finkel, attempted to gain entry into the Netherlands under an assumed identity. The purpose was to infiltrate the ICC via an internship, which would have given him to access and potentially influence the pending criminal war crimes case.

As of June 2024, the ICC has issued arrest warrants for six Russian suspects. President Putin and Maria Lvova-Belova were indicted in March 2023 for their involvement in the abduction and deportation of Ukrainian children. Russian military officials Viktor Sokolov and Sergey Kobylash were indicted in April 2024 for ordering missile strikes against civilian infrastructure. Defence Minister Sergei Shoigu and Valery Gerasimov were indicted in June of the same year for similar reasons.

=== International Court of Justice ===
On 27 February, Ukraine filed a petition with the International Court of Justice arguing that Russia violated the Genocide Convention using an unsubstantiated accusation of genocide in order to justify its aggression against Ukraine.

On 1 March, the ICJ officially called on Russia to "act in such a way" that would make it possible for a decision on provisional measures to become effective. Initial hearings in the case took place on 7 March 2022 at Peace Palace in The Hague, Netherlands—the seat of the court—to determine Ukraine's entitlement to provisional relief. The Russian delegation did not appear for these proceedings, but submitted a written statement.

On 16 March 2022, the court ruled 13–2 that Russia must "immediately suspend the military operations" it commenced on 24 February 2022 in Ukraine, with Vice-president Kirill Gevorgian of Russia and Judge Xue Hanqin of China dissenting. The court also unanimously called for "[b]oth Parties [to] refrain from any action which might aggravate or extend the dispute before the Court or make it more difficult to resolve.

=== Special tribunal ===
The Council of Europe called for the establishment of an international criminal tribunal to "investigate and prosecute the crime of aggression" committed by "the political and military leadership of the Russian Federation." Under the Council of Europe's proposal, the tribunal should be located in Strasbourg, "apply the definition of the crime of aggression" established in customary international law and "have the power to issue international arrest warrants and not be limited by State immunity or the immunity of heads of State and government and other State officials." Similarly, other international bodies such as the European Commission and the NATO Parliamentary Assembly, and several governments, including the Government of Ukraine, supported the establishment of a specialised court to try the crime of aggression.

In November 2022 the NATO Parliamentary Assembly designated the Russian Federation as a terrorist organization and called upon the international community to "take collective action towards the establishment of an international tribunal to prosecute the crime of aggression committed by Russia with its war against Ukraine." In November 2022 the European Commission said that the European Union would work to establish a specialised court to investigate and prosecute Russia for the crime of aggression.

On 25 June 2025, the Special Tribunal for the Crime of Aggression against Ukraine was formally created by a formal legal agreement between the Council of Europe and Ukraine.

== Other international organisations ==
=== International Commission of Inquiry on Ukraine ===
On 4 March 2022, the United Nations Human Rights Council voted 32 to 3, with 13 abstentions to create the Independent International Commission of Inquiry on Ukraine, an independent international committee of three human rights experts with a mandate to investigate violations of human rights and of international humanitarian law in the 2022 Russian invasion of Ukraine. On 23 September 2022, the Commission confirmed violations of human rights by Russian forces, with instances of indiscriminate killing, sexual violence against children, and torture in dozens of locations in Ukraine. They said that explosive weapons with wide-area effects had caused immense harm and suffering to civilians in populated areas, and confirmed victims had been found with visible signs of execution. They documented cases of children raped, tortured, and unlawfully confined. Children were also killed and injured in indiscriminate attacks with explosive weapons.

=== UN Human Rights Monitoring Mission in Ukraine ===
The UN Human Rights Monitoring Mission in Ukraine (HRMMU), whose monitoring of human rights violations by all parties in Ukraine started in 2014, continued its monitoring during the 2022 Russian invasion, retaining 60 monitors in Ukraine. On 30 March 2022, HRMMU had recorded 24 "credible allegations" of Russian use of cluster munitions and 77 incidents of damage to medical facilities during the invasion. Michelle Bachelet stated, "The massive destruction of civilian objects and the high number of civilian casualties strongly indicate that the fundamental principles of distinction, proportionality and precaution have not been sufficiently adhered to."

=== Organization for Security and Co-operation in Europe ===
In response to the Moscow Mechanism being invoked on 3 March 2022, a three-person mission of experts was appointed within the rules of the mechanism. The mission's report, released by the OSCE Office for Democratic Institutions and Human Rights (ODIHR) on 12 April 2022, stated that while a detailed assessment of most allegations had not been possible, the mission had found clear patterns of war crimes by the Russian forces. According to the report, had the Russian army refrained from indiscriminate and disproportionate attacks, the number of civilians casualties would have remained much lower and fewer houses, hospitals, schools and cultural properties would have been damaged or destroyed. The report denounced the violation of international humanitarian law on military occupation and the violation of international human rights law (right to life, prohibition of torture and other inhuman and degrading treatment and punishment) mostly in the areas under the direct or indirect control of Russia.

== International reactions ==
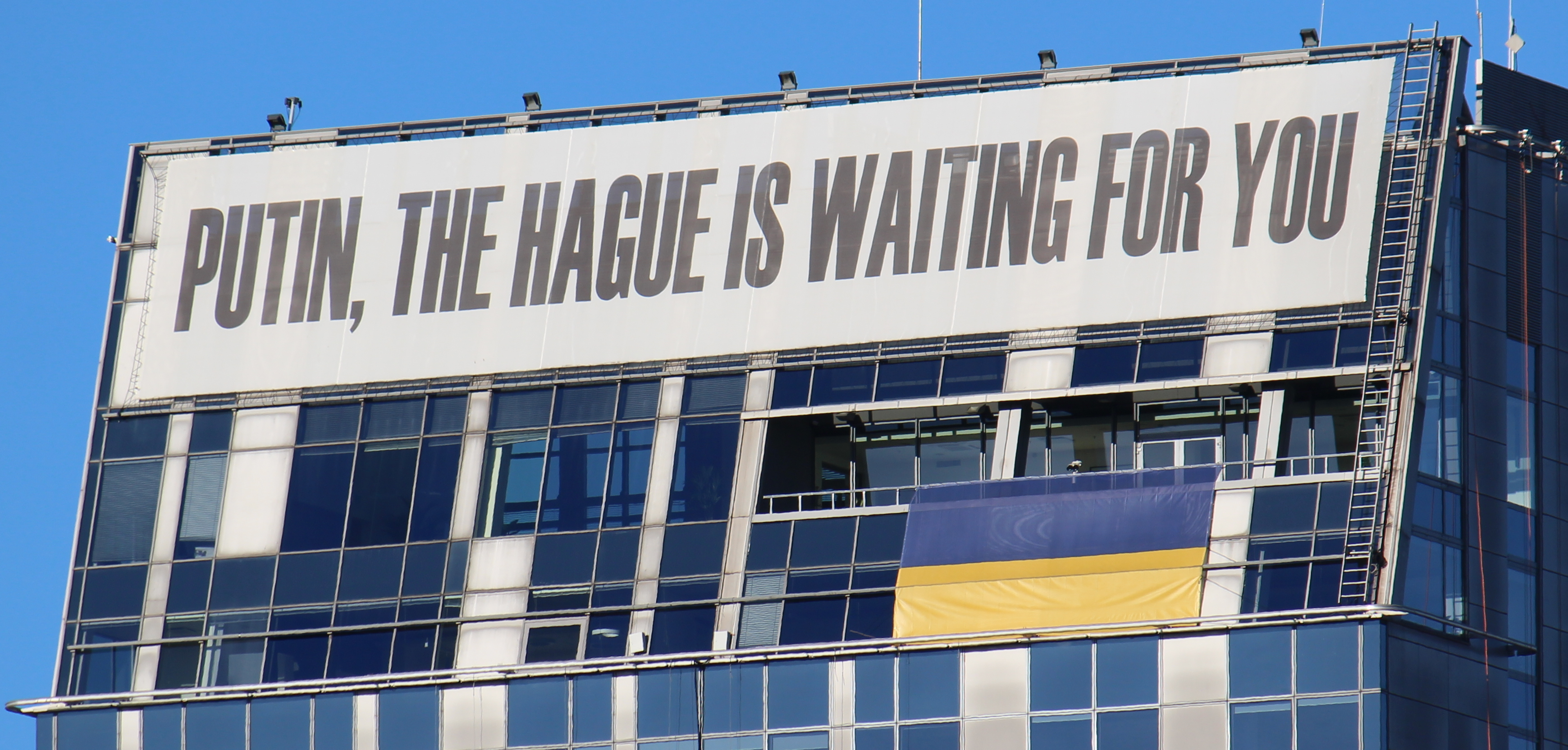
Banner raised by the Vilnius City Municipality.

- On 25 February, the Federated States of Micronesia announced that it was severing diplomatic relations with Russia in protest against the Russian aggression against Ukraine.
- During House of Commons commentary in February 2022, British Prime Minister Boris Johnson stated that "anyone who sends a Russian into battle to kill innocent Ukrainians" could face charges. He remarked in addition, "Putin will stand condemned in the eyes of the world and of history."
- On 16 March, U.S. President Joe Biden called Putin a war criminal. On 23 March, U.S. Secretary of State Antony Blinken announced that "based on information currently available, the US government assesses that members of Russia's forces have committed war crimes in Ukraine." A week later the US State Department issued a formal assessment that Russia has committed war crimes. On 12 April 2022, Biden described Russia's war crimes in Ukraine as constituting genocide. He added that Putin "is trying to wipe out the idea of being able to be Ukrainian".
- On 23 March 2022, the Sejm of the Republic of Poland recognised Putin as a war criminal.
- On 28 April 2022, the Parliament of Canada recognised Russia’s actions in Ukraine as genocide.
- On 3 April 2022, French Foreign Minister Jean-Yves Le Drian described abuses by Russian forces in Ukrainian towns, particularly Bucha, as possible war crimes. On 7 April, French President Emmanuel Macron said the killings in the Ukrainian town of Bucha were "very probably war crimes."
- The United Nations General Assembly voted on 7 April 2022 to suspend Russia from the United Nations Human Rights Council over "gross and systematic violations and abuses of human rights".
- On 10 May 2022, the Seimas of the Republic of Lithuania unanimously adopted a resolution recognising the Russian invasion of Ukraine as genocide and Russia itself as a state supporting terrorism.
- On 11 May 2022, the Senate of the Czech Republic recognised the crimes committed by the Russian army in Ukraine as genocide against the Ukrainian people.
- On 11 July 2022, it was reported that Romania had opened an investigation into Russian crimes against humanity.
- On 11 August 2022, the Saeima of Latvia recognised Russia as a state sponsor of terrorism.
- On 27 May 2022, U.S. President Joe Biden accused Putin of attempting to destroy the culture and identity of the Ukrainian people.
- On 18 October 2022, the Parliament of Estonia adopted a resolution recognising Russia as a state sponsor of terrorism and condemning Russia’s attempted annexation of occupied Ukrainian territories.
- On 26 October 2022, the Senate of Poland recognised the authorities of the Russian Federation as a terrorist regime.
- On 16 November 2022, the lower house of the Czech Parliament adopted a resolution describing the regime in Russia as “terrorist”.
- On 21 November 2022, the NATO Parliamentary Assembly recognised Russia as a terrorist state and called for the establishment of a special international tribunal to prosecute the crime of Russian aggression.
- On 23 November 2022, the European Parliament adopted a resolution recognising Russia as a state sponsor of terrorism.
- On 24 November 2022, the Parliament of the Netherlands recognised Russia as a state sponsor of terrorism.
- On 17 March 2023, the International Criminal Court in The Hague issued arrest warrants for Russian President Vladimir Putin and Maria Lvova-Belova, Russia’s Commissioner for Children’s Rights.
- On 8 May 2023, the International Nuremberg Principles Academy published a declaration on the crime of aggression, calling on the international community to support the establishment of a tribunal to prosecute crimes of aggression committed on the territory of Ukraine.
- On 10 June 2023, it was reported that 32 countries had joined proceedings brought by Ukraine against Russia before the International Court of Justice under the Genocide Convention.
- On 4 July 2023, it was reported that the OSCE Parliamentary Assembly had recognised the Russian Federation as a sponsor of terrorism.
- On 30 May 2024, the Parliament of Moldova condemned what it described as Russia’s policy of genocide against Ukraine, including the forced transfer and deportation of Ukrainian children from occupied territories.
- On 9 July 2025, the European Parliament adopted a resolution condemning Russian war crimes in Ukraine. The resolution stated that Russia’s full-scale invasion of Ukraine, launched in February 2022, had shattered peace and stability in Europe and seriously undermined global security.

== See also ==
- Atrocity crimes during the Russo-Ukrainian War
- Casualties of the Russo-Ukrainian War
- Disinformation in the Russian invasion of Ukraine#Denial of Russian war crimes
- Use of incendiary weapons in the Russo-Ukrainian war
