= CDEK =

Russian delivery services company

- Industry: Courier
- Founded: 2000
- Founder: Leonid Goldort; Vyacheslav Piksayev
- Headquarters: Novosibirsk, Russia
- Website: www.cdek.ru

CDEK (Russian: СДЭК, from Служба доставки экспресс-курьер, lit. 'Express Courier Delivery Service') is an express delivery company based in Novosibirsk, Russia.

== History ==
CDEK was founded in 2000 in Novosibirsk by graduates of the Novosibirsk State University Leonid Goldort and Vyacheslav Piksayev in 2000 to transport goods from the Korzina.ru online store to the cities of Siberia and the Russian Far East. A year later, the company began operating in Moscow, and two years later, in Saint Petersburg.

In 2020, the company invested more than 600 million rubles to create its own parcel locker network. In April 2020, a restriction on concluding contracts with individuals was introduced. The second stage was to inform FL customers of the automatic termination of contracts by 31.03.2020. Thus, CDEK completely switched to contractual work with legal entities and self-employed citizens.

In May 2022, CDEK launched the CDEK marketplace. Shopping, where you can buy goods from abroad.

In November 2023, it became known that the founder and majority shareholder Leonid Goldort was going to sell his stake in the business before moving to Israel. The company was valued in the range of 20 to 35 billion rubles. In April 2024, it was reported that a buyer had been found — 55.44% of the company owned by Goldort should transfer to one of the funds managed by the Modern Real Estate Funds Management Company. The terms and amount of the transaction were not disclosed.

On May 26, 2024, the company suspended the acceptance and delivery of shipments. The international hacker group Head Mare assumed responsibility for the shutdown of the CDEK parcel delivery service. The hackers claimed to have used a cryptographic virus. It was only on May 29 that the company was able to resume the delivery of parcels already at the pick-up points. On June 1, CDEK announced that it had resumed receiving shipments by couriers, and everything was in order with the orders placed earlier before the failure.

== Geography ==
The company delivers goods to 195 countries and 36,000 localities in Russia.

== Addresses ==
- Novosibirsk, Krivoshchyokovskaya Street, 15;
- Moscow, Zavoda Serp i Molot Proyezd, 3;
- Shanghai, Changning District, West Yang'An Street, 777.

== Gallery ==
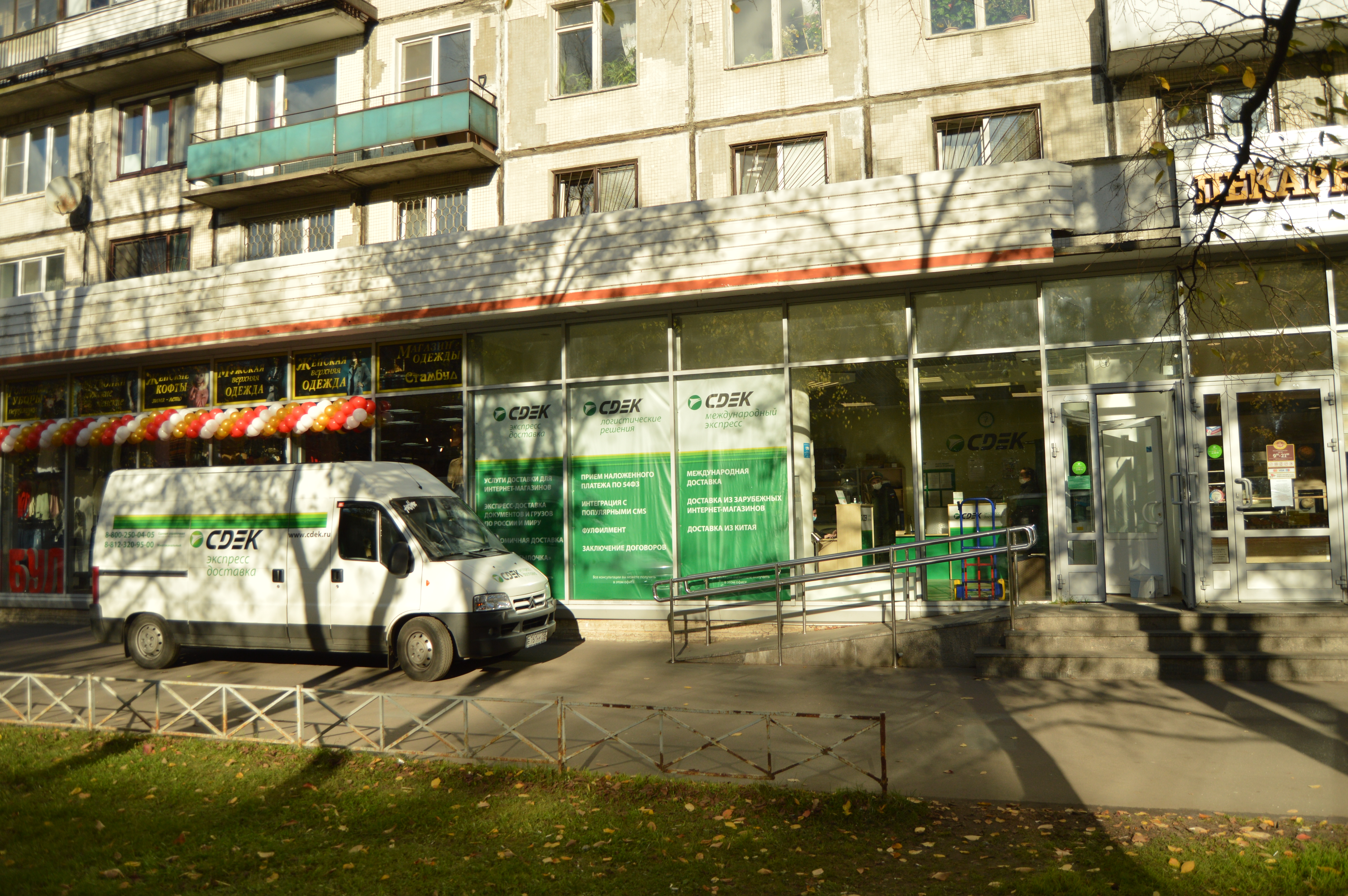
Office in St. Petersburg

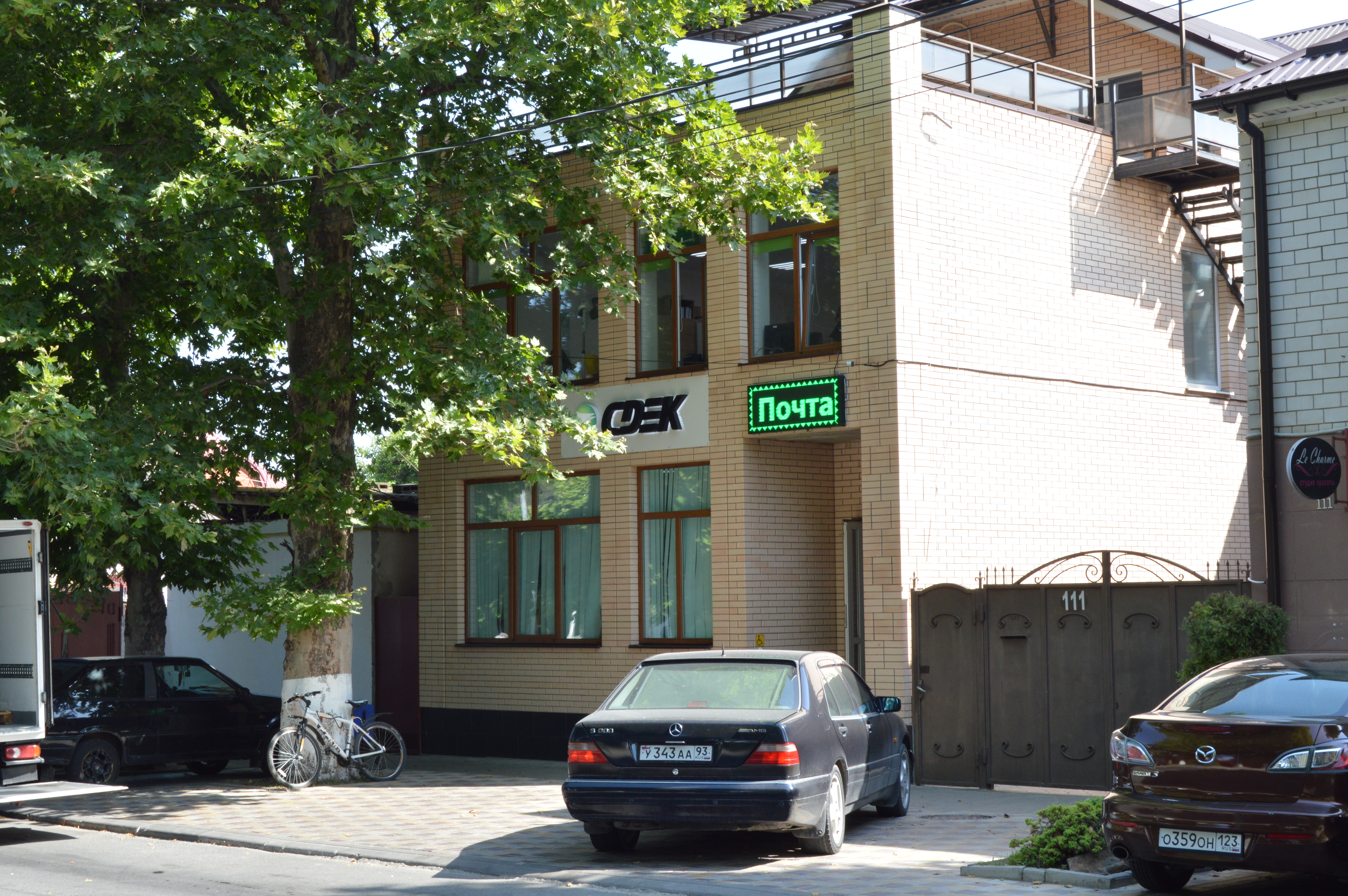
Office in Anapa
