= Allegations of genocide of Ukrainians in the Russo-Ukrainian war =

Allegations of genocide of Ukrainians in the Russo-Ukrainian War
- Part of the Russo-Ukrainian War
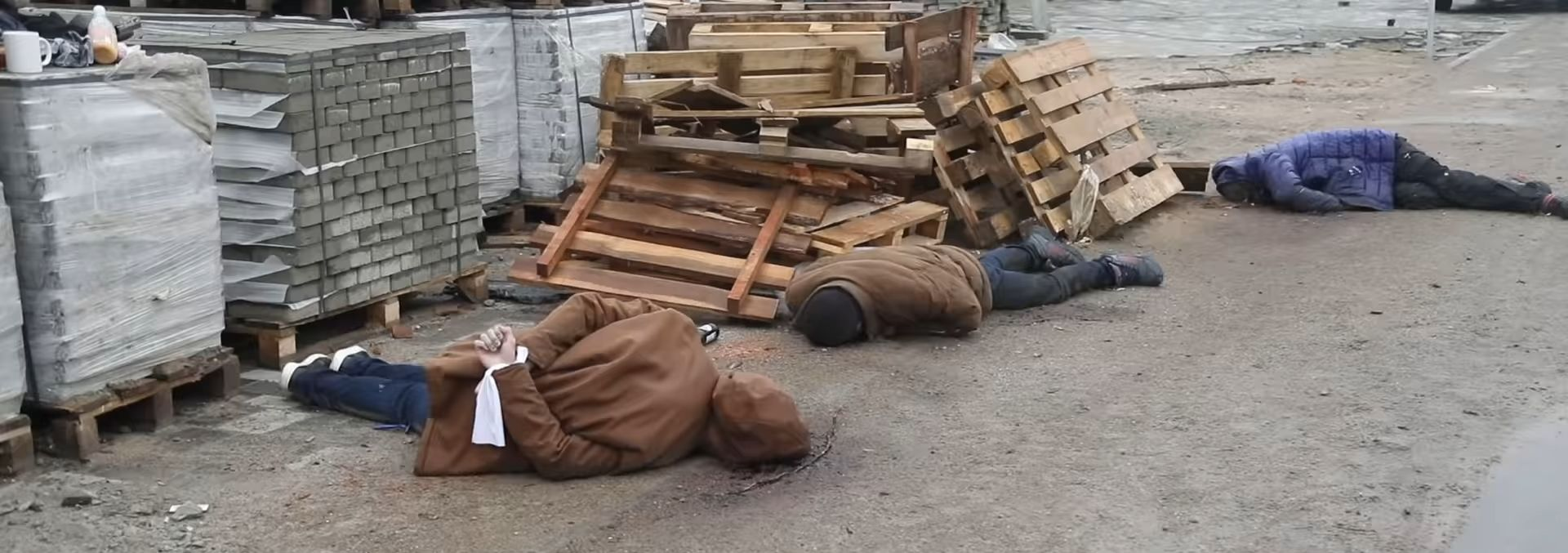
- Bucha massacre victims, April 2022

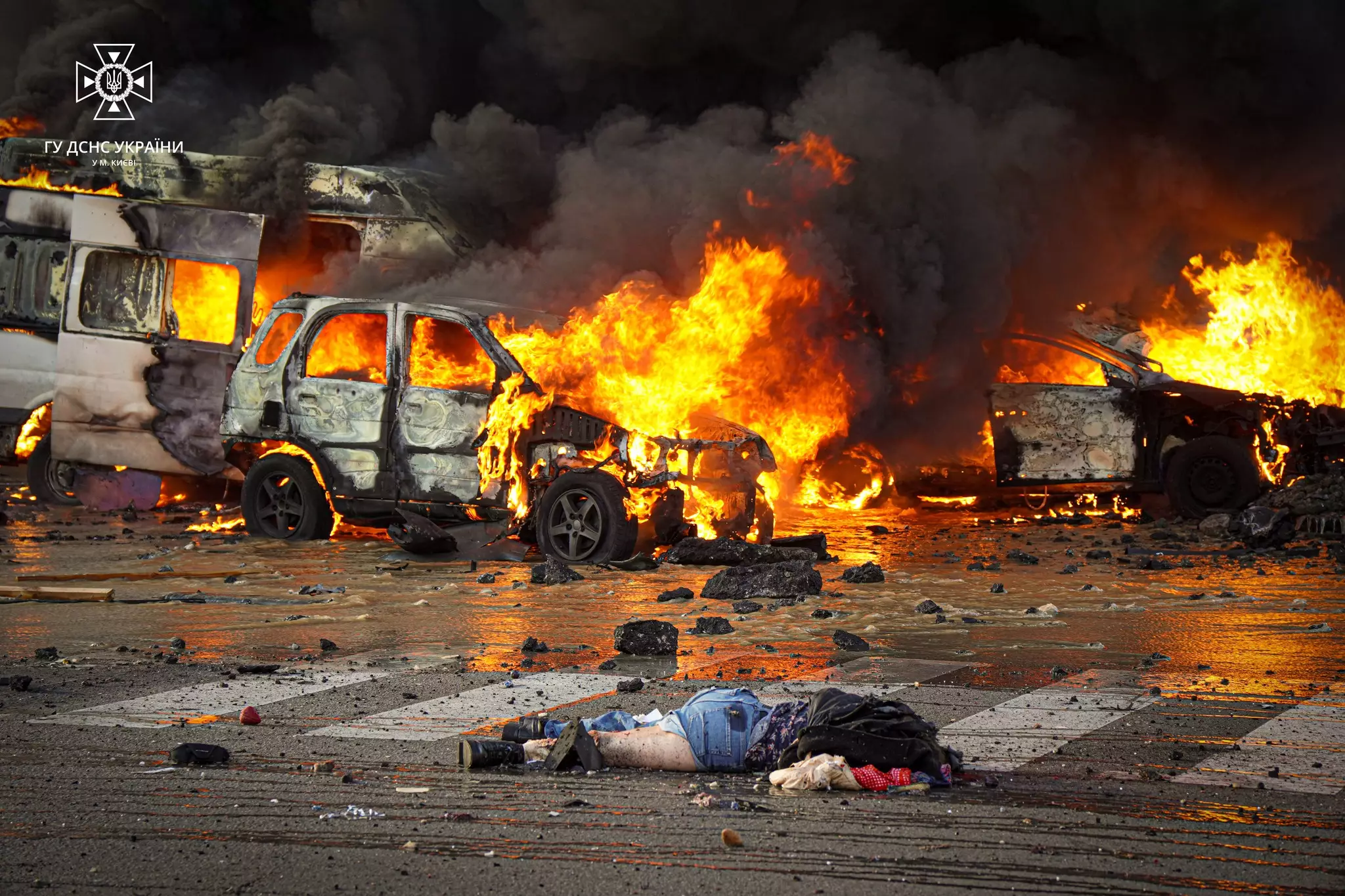
- Kyiv after Russian shelling, October 2022
- Location: Ukraine
- Date: 2014 – present
- Target: Ukrainians as a national group
- Attack type: Incitement to genocide; Genocide; Mass murder; Ethnic cleansing; Sexual violence; Forced displacement; Population transfer; Attacks on civilian infrastructure; Destruction of cultural heritage; Forced assimilation; Child abductions; Sexual mutilation
- Deaths: Documented deaths: 3,404 civilians (2014–2022); 17,605 civilians (2022–present, minimum, true total believed to be far higher); At least 79,061 soldiers killed in action; Estimated deaths: Carl Connetta's estimate: 40,000 civilians dead (May 2023); RFI estimate: 50,000 civilians dead; Ukrainian estimate: 100,000 civilians dead (February 2023)
- Injuries: At least 55,846 civilians; ~380,000 soldiers wounded in action
- Victims: At least 20,000 children abducted; 75,253 soldiers missing in action; 1.6 million Ukrainians deported to Russia; 8 million internally displaced persons; More than 6 million emigrated as refugees; At least 468 cultural sites destroyed or damaged
- Defender: Ukraine
- Motive: Russian irredentism; Anti-Ukrainian sentiment; Russification; All-Russian nation theory
- Accused: Russia: Russian government, under President Vladimir Putin, Prime Minister Mikhail Mishustin, Children's Rights Commissioner Maria Lvova-Belova, and previously Anna Kuznetsova; Russian Armed Forces, under Andrey Belousov, Valery Gerasimov, and previously Sergei Shoigu; Wagner Group, under Yevgeny Prigozhin and Dmitry Utkin (until 2023); Belarus, under President Alexander Lukashenko

According to multiple national governments, international organisations (Council of Europe, OSCE, NATO), independent experts and media outlets, Russia and its ally Belarus are committing genocide against the Ukrainian people as part of the ongoing Russo-Ukrainian War, including the Russian annexation of Crimea, the war in Donbas, and especially in the wake of the full-scale Russian invasion of Ukraine and the subsequent occupation and annexation of Ukrainian territory. Scholars and commentators including Eugene Finkel, Timothy Snyder and Gregory Stanton; and legal experts such as Otto Luchterhandt and Zakhar Tropin, have made claims of varying degrees of certainty that Russia is committing genocide in Ukraine. A comprehensive report by the Raoul Wallenberg Centre for Human Rights concluded that there exists a "very serious risk of genocide" in the Russian invasion of Ukraine.

Genocide scholar Alexander Hinton stated on 13 April 2022 that Russian president Vladimir Putin's genocidal rhetoric would have to be linked to the war crimes in order to establish genocidal intent, but it is "quite likely" that Russia is committing genocide in Ukraine. War crimes committed by Russian forces include the Bucha massacre, sexual violence, extrajudicial killings, torture, looting, the blockade of Oleshky, and the establishment of "filtration camps" to facilitate the large-scale deportation of Ukrainians to Russia.

On 17 March 2023, following an investigation of war crimes, crimes against humanity, or genocide, the International Criminal Court (ICC) issued arrest warrants for Vladimir Putin, the President of Russia, and Maria Lvova-Belova, Russian Commissioner for Children's Rights, for the unlawful deportation and transfer of children from Ukraine to Russia during the Russian invasion of Ukraine. According to the Russian Ministry of Defense, over 307,000 children were transferred to Russia from 24 February to 18 June 2022, alone. In April 2023, the Council of Europe deemed the forced transfers of children as constituting an act of genocide with an overwhelming majority of 87 in favour of the resolution to 1 against and 1 abstaining.

== Background ==
=== Legal definition of genocide ===
Under the 1948 Genocide Convention, genocide requires both genocidal intent ("intent to destroy, in whole or in part") and acts carried out to destroy "a national, ethnic, racial, or religious group" with that intent; the acts can be any of:

(a) Killing members of the group;
(b) Causing serious bodily or mental harm to members of the group;
(c) Deliberately inflicting on the group conditions of life calculated to bring about its physical destruction in whole or in part;
(d) Imposing measures intended to prevent births within the group;
(e) Forcibly transferring children of the group to another group.

— Convention on the Prevention and Punishment of the Crime of Genocide, Article 2

Punishable acts include genocide and also complicity in and attempts, conspiracy, or incitement to commit genocide, and parties to the convention have an obligation to prevent and suppress them.

=== Russian war crimes ===
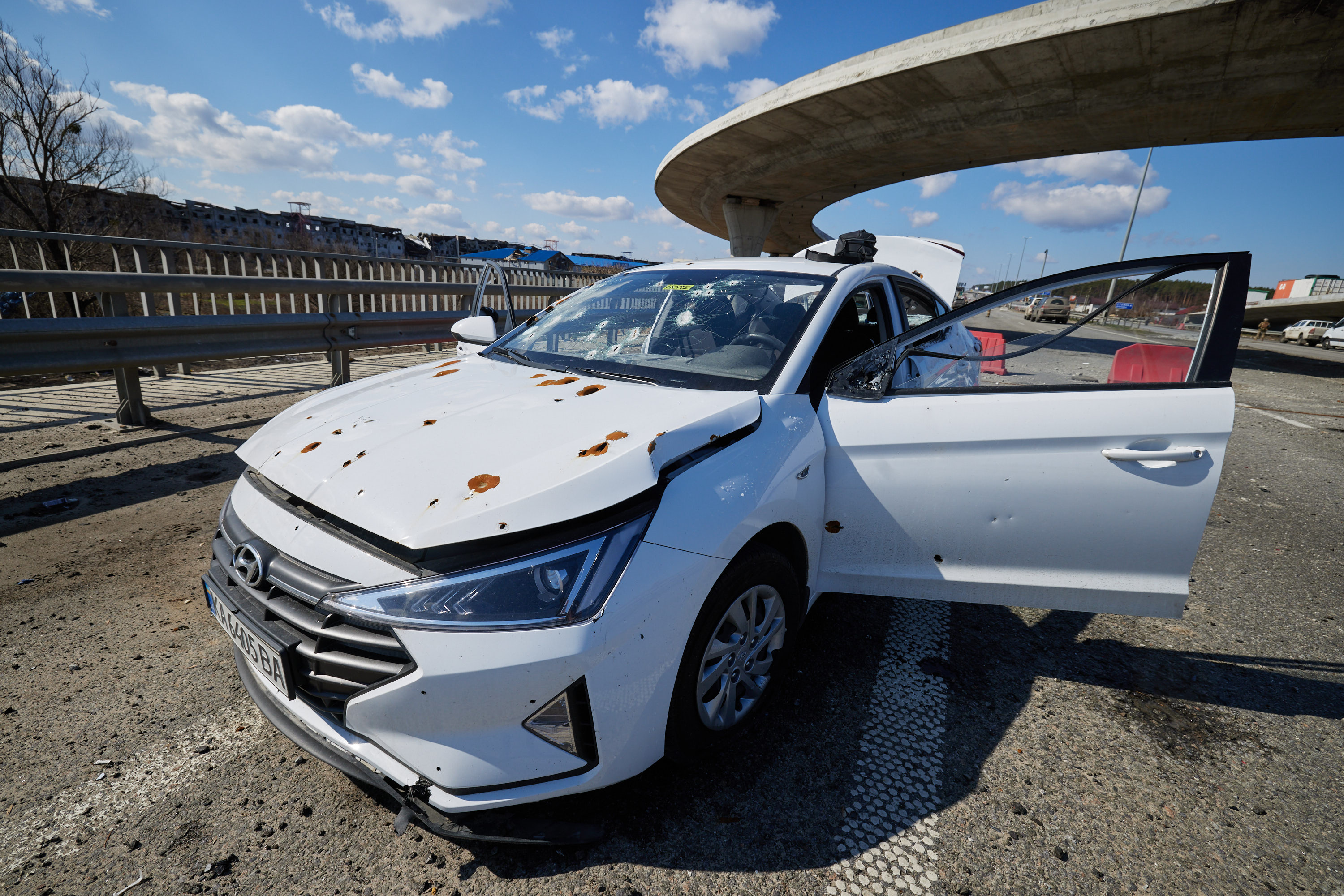
A civilian car with bullet holes on the outskirts of Irpin in the Kyiv Oblast

The human rights organizations Amnesty International and Human Rights Watch recorded mass cases of crimes by the Russian Armed Forces against civilians during the Russian invasion of Ukraine, including torture, executions, rape, and looting. After the Bucha massacre, Secretary General Agnès Callamard said that crimes committed "are not isolated incidents and are likely part of an even larger pattern of war crimes, including extrajudicial executions, torture, and rape in other occupied regions of Ukraine."

According to Dr. Jack Watling of the Royal Joint Institute for Defense Studies, these actions are part of the Russian doctrine of anti-guerrilla warfare. Its goal is "to take revenge on the population for the audacity to resist." Watling noted that similar tactics were used in the Second Chechen War, in the Afghanistan conflict, and during World War II.

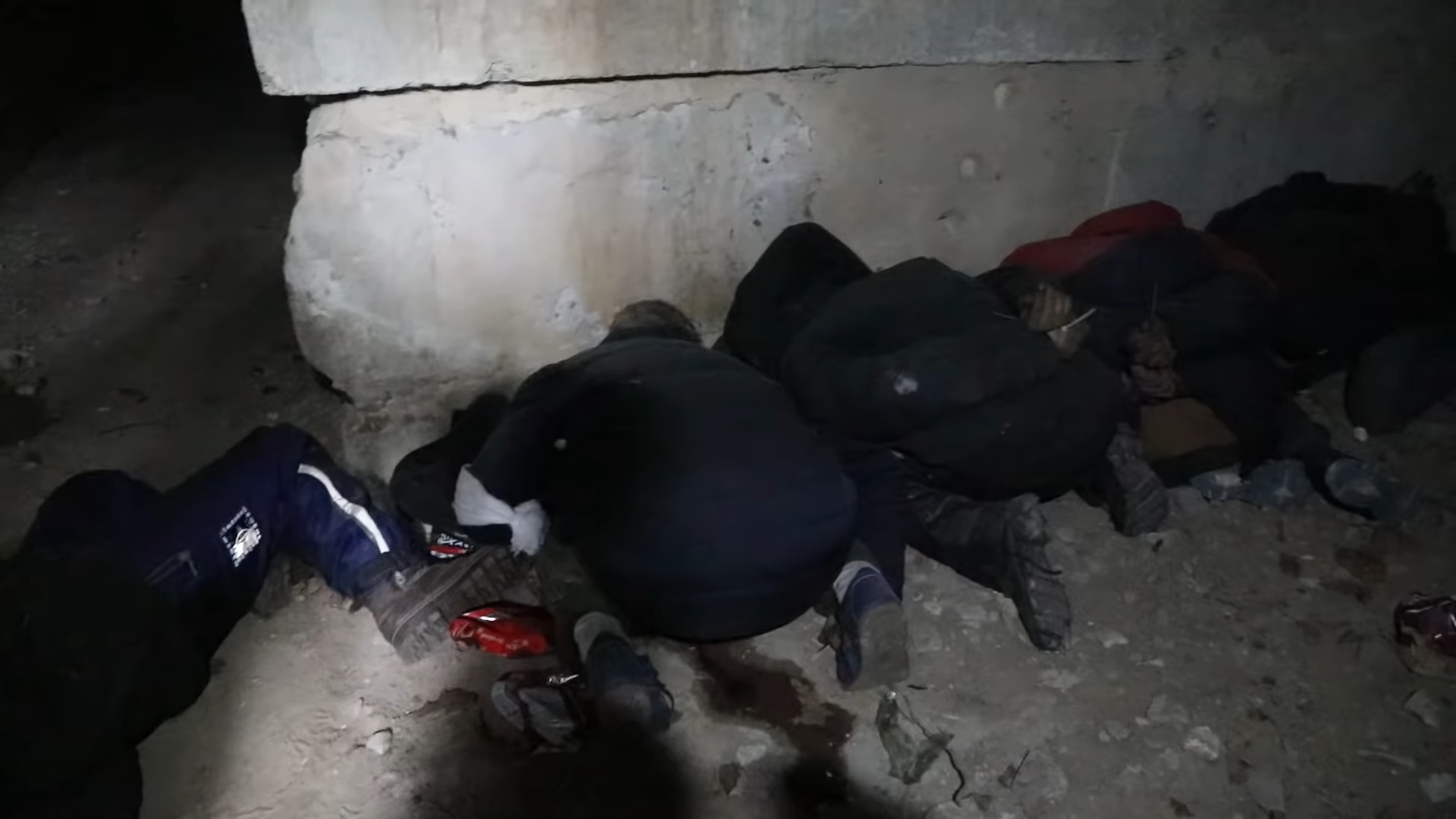
Shot civilians in a basement in one of Bucha's homes

Representatives of the intelligence communities of the United Kingdom and Germany reported that the killings of civilians were organized. The head of British intelligence MI6, Richard Moore, in connection with the killings in Bucha, noted: "We knew that Putin's plans for the invasion included extrajudicial executions by the military and special services."

On 7 April 2022, German magazine Der Spiegel published data from a German intelligence report indicating that Russian military personnel have killed civilians and executed Ukrainian prisoners of war after they were interrogated. These reports were corroborated by the location and presence of bodies found in Bucha. Der Spiegel concluded that the massacres were neither random nor spontaneous acts by the military. Rather, the evidence indicates that the killings of civilians could be part of a "clear strategy" to "intimidate the civilian population and suppress resistance."

The International Federation for Human Rights and its affiliate in Ukraine, the Center for Civil Liberties (CCL), reported evidence of the forcible transfer of civilians by the Russian military from the besieged Mariupol to Russia and the Donetsk and Luhansk oblasts and Crimea using filtration camps. According to the CSF, families were separated, and documents and phones were confiscated. According to the CSF, Russian forces also prevented civilians from passing through humanitarian corridors to the non-occupied parts of Ukraine, opening fire on them. According to Ukrainian officials, the same practice was used by Russian troops in Sumy, Kharkiv, and Kyiv.

The director of Amnesty International Ukraine, in an interview with Deutsche Welle on 4 April 2022, accused Russia of using targeted tactics to deplete the civilian population in besieged cities (deliberately cutting off access to food, water, electricity, and heat supply) and bringing them to a humanitarian catastrophe. There were noted cases of blocking humanitarian corridors, shelling of buses, and killing of civilians who tried to leave the besieged cities.

On 20 August 2022, the permanent representative of the Russian Federation to international organizations in Vienna, Mikhail Ulyanov, in response to the post of thanks to the President of Ukraine, Volodymyr Zelenskyy, for the new package of military aid from the United States, published a post on Twitter calling on the Ukrainian population not to be spared. Later, Ulyanov deleted his post. The Chairman of the Verkhovna Rada of Ukraine, Ruslan Stefanchuk appealed to President of Austria Alexander Van der Bellen and Chancellor Karl Nehammer, demanding to recognize Mikhail Ulyanov as persona non grata and to deport him to the Russian Federation due to his genocidal calls.

During ceasefire negotiations in November 2025, President Putin threatened that Russia would continue fighting "until the last Ukrainian dies" if Ukraine did not surrender occupied territories.

== Involvement of Belarus ==
The Belarusian state and state-affiliated organisations have actively participated in the child abduction of Ukrainian children. Ukrainian children have been deported to Belarus, where they are held in recreational camps. The National Anti-Crisis Management Group, a Belarusian organisation headed by Belarusian opposition figure Pavel Latushka, used open-source information to report in August 2023 that at least 2,100 Ukrainian children had been transferred to Belarus. According to Latushka, they were being held in summer camps administered by state-owned corporations. He also said that state documents showed the transfers are being conducted under the authority of the Union State. The transfers of Ukrainian children have been shown on Belarusian state television. There are indications of re-education efforts by the Belarusian state. Much of the information about the child abductions has come from their parents; children that have been deported to Belarus were abducted from regions of Ukraine which were still under Russian occupation as of August 2023, impeding investigations.

According to international humanitarian law, children in war zones should be evacuated to neutral third countries whenever possible; Belarus lent its territory to be used as a staging ground for the 2022 Russian invasion of Ukraine.

In a July 2023 interview with the Belarusian state TV channel Belarus-1, Dzmitry Shautsou, the head of the Belarus Red Cross, clad in military clothing embellished with the Z symbol, admitted to the abduction and deportation of Ukrainian children from Russian-occupied areas to Belarus for "health improvement" reasons, saying that it would continue to do so. The International Federation of Red Cross and Red Crescent Societies distanced itself from his statements while expressing "grave concern," demanded a halt to the practice, and launched an investigation by its investigative committee.

In February 2024, the European Union blacklisted Shautsou, as well as several other persons and organizations from Belarus for their involvement in the Ukrainian child abductions. The United States, Ukraine, Australia, and New Zealand have also imposed sanctions in relation to the forced deportations.

== Statements by officials and organizations ==
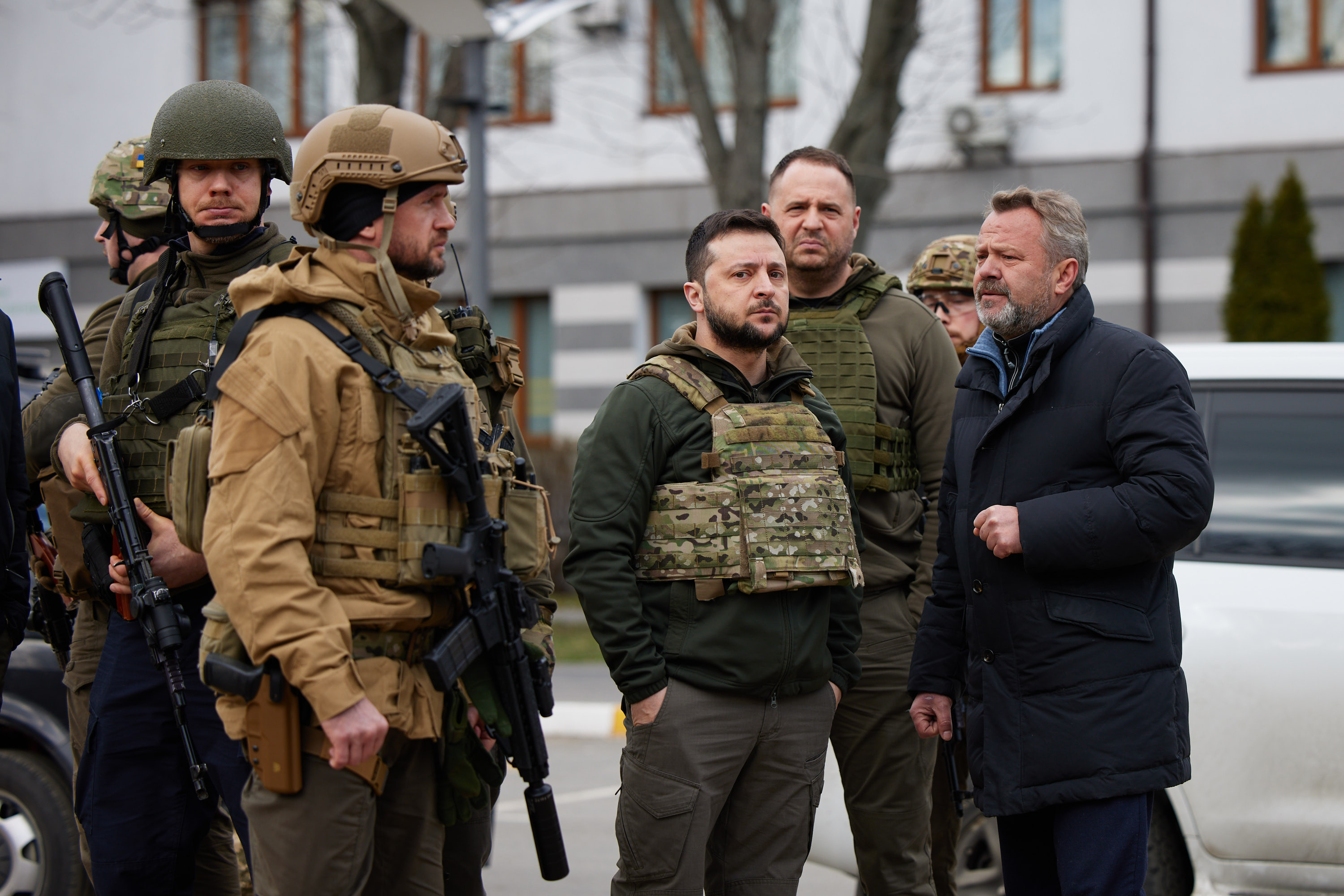
Volodymyr Zelenskyy during a working trip to Kyiv Oblast

Days after the discovery of evidence of the Bucha massacre, Ukrainian President Volodymyr Zelenskyy declared that Ukraine was experiencing an attempted genocide. Polish President Andrzej Duda, Prime Minister of Poland Mateusz Morawiecki, Prime Minister of Spain Pedro Sanchez, Colombian President Iván Duque, American President Joe Biden, and Prime Minister of Canada Justin Trudeau also called the situation in Ukraine a genocide. British Prime Minister Boris Johnson said that the atrocities in Bucha do not "look far short of genocide."

On 13 April 2022, French President Emmanuel Macron said he wanted to be "careful with terms," questioning the usefulness of the "escalation of words" to end the war, specifying that "Russia unilaterally launched a brutal war, and it is now established that war crimes were committed by the Russian army." Zelenskyy criticized Macron's characterization.

The All-Ukrainian Council of Churches and Religious Organizations called on every state in the world to recognize the genocide of the Ukrainian people during the 2022 Russian invasion and condemn the ideology of the "Russian world."

Genocide Watch, a Washington, D.C.-based non-governmental organization founded by Gregory Stanton, issued a Genocide Emergency Alert in April 2022, accusing Russia of committing genocide against Ukrainians via a policy of "urbicide."

Several international organizations adopted resolutions demanding investigation into the issue of the genocide. The list includes PACE, the European Parliament.

Numerous other state leaders and officials have made statements about the issue.

In response to the illegal detention of several Crimean Tatar women, the Ministry of Foreign Affairs of Ukraine released a statement accusing Russia of a "systematic attack on the Crimean Tatar people, aimed at destroying their national identity, spirituality, and right to their own land."

== International recognition ==
Countries in blue recognise genocide as occurring in the 2022 Russian invasion of Ukraine, countries in yellow partially recognise genocide as occurring (2022).

On 23 March 2022, the Sejm of Poland adopted a resolution on the commission by Russia of war crimes, crimes against humanity, and violations of human rights on the territory of Ukraine. In accordance with the resolution, Poland condemned acts of genocide and other violations of international law committed by Russian troops on the territory of Ukraine. The resolution states that these crimes were committed "on the orders of the military commander-in-chief President Vladimir Putin."

On 14 April 2022, the Verkhovna Rada of Ukraine adopted a resolution, "On the commission of genocide in Ukraine by the Russian Federation," in which the actions of the Russian troops and the Russian leadership in Ukraine are recognized as genocide of the Ukrainian people. In accordance with the statement of the Rada on the resolution, acts of genocide by Russia included:

- mass atrocities committed by Russian troops in the temporarily occupied territories
- systematic cases of the deliberate killing of civilians
- mass deportations of the civilian population
- the transfer of displaced Ukrainian children into the education system of the Russian Federation
- seizure and targeted destruction of economic infrastructure facilities
- systemic actions of the Russian Federation, designed for the gradual destruction of the Ukrainian people

In June 2022, a bipartisan group in the United States Congress introduced a resolution characterizing Russian actions in Ukraine as genocide, and in July the US Senate did so, but neither has been agreed upon as of November 2022.

Countries which recognize the ongoing events in Ukraine as genocide:

- Estonia
- Latvia
- Lithuania
- Ukraine

Partial recognition (not approved as law):

- Canada (only lower house)
- Czech Republic (only upper house)
- Ireland (only upper house)
- Poland (only lower house)

== Investigations and international arrest warrants ==
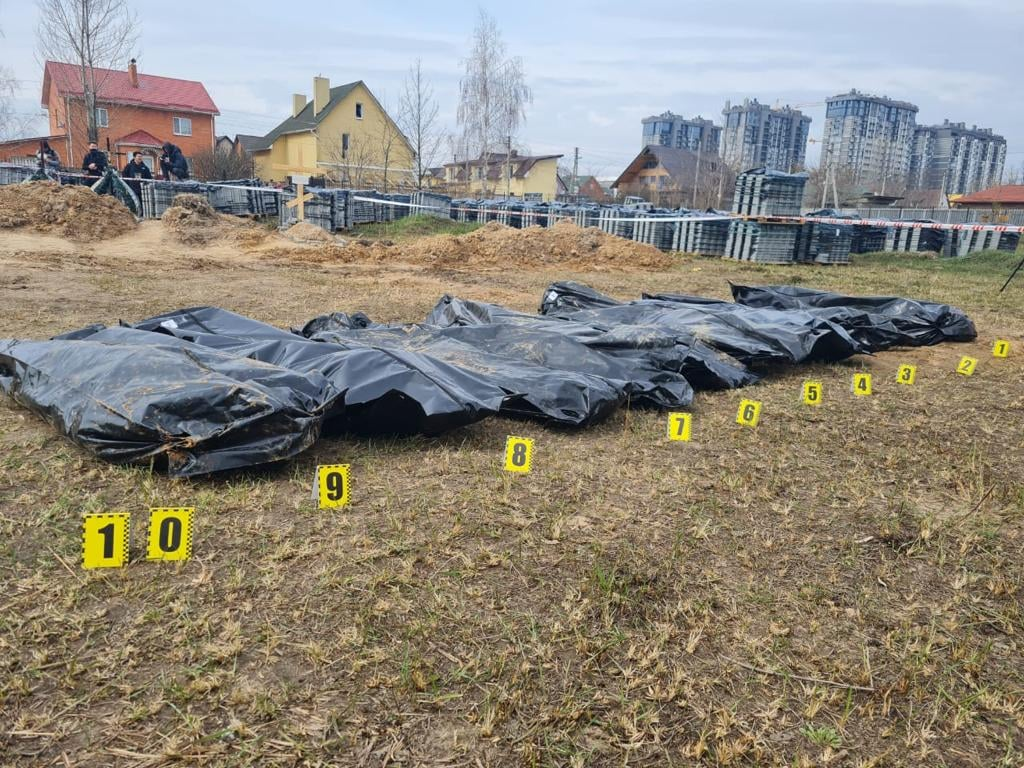
Body bags with killed civilians in them in Bucha after the Russian occupation of the city

In early March 2022, the Chief Prosecutor of the International Criminal Court, Karim Ahmad Khan, after obtaining formal referrals from 39 countries, commenced an investigation into possible war crimes, crimes against humanity, and genocide committed "by any person" in Ukraine since November 2013. Prior to 2022, the preliminary investigation had found "reasonable grounds for believing that crimes within the jurisdiction of the court have been committed" and "identified potential cases that would be admissible."

On 4 March 2022, the UN Human Rights Council created an Independent International Commission of Inquiry on Ukraine to investigate violations of human rights and of international humanitarian law. On 25 September 2023, Commission Chair Erik Møse delivered an update at the 54th session of the council, saying, "The Commission is also concerned about allegations of genocide in Ukraine. For instance, some of the rhetoric transmitted in Russian state and other media may constitute incitement to genocide."

Other investigations of war crimes were also undertaken separately under universal jurisdiction, initiated by independent states.

In November 2022, Ukraine's Prosecutor General Andriy Kostin stated that Ukrainian law enforcement officers have recorded "more than 300 facts that belong precisely to the definition of genocide" and that five proceedings on genocide are being investigated.

On 17 March 2023, the ICC issued a warrant for Putin's arrest, alleging that Putin held criminal responsibility for the war crime of unlawful deportation and transfer of children from Ukraine to Russia during the Russian invasion of Ukraine. It was the first time that the ICC had issued an arrest warrant for the head of state of one of the five Permanent Members of the United Nations Security Council.

In April 2023, the European Union's Eurojust joint investigation team (JIT) on alleged core international crimes committed in Ukraine added the crime of genocide to their war crimes investigation in Ukraine.

== ICJ case ==
Ukraine brought a case against Russia at the International Court of Justice (ICJ) on 26 February 2022, alleging breaches of the Genocide Convention and requesting that the court require Russia to cease its invasion. Although Ukraine's case was mainly focused on Russia's allegation of genocide against Ukraine, the nation also accused Russia of planning "acts of genocide in Ukraine" and of committing the actus reus of genocide by deliberately killing and inflicting serious injury on the Ukrainian population. The ICJ ruled on March 16, 2022, that the case could proceed.

At a hearing in September 2023, the Ukrainian side presented a large number of statements from Russian politicians, including Vladimir Putin, which, in their opinion, expressed genocidal intent. Representing the Russian side, Gennady Kuzmin argued that these "declarations were just declarations and have no legal relation and are unrelated to the Genocide Convention." At the ICJ, Russia had initially deflected that it was Ukraine who committed "genocide of Russian-speaking residents" and used it as justification for its aggression, and when Ukraine replied that no such genocide happened, Kuzmin had argued that since Ukraine claims "no genocide happened," the case should be dismissed, thus ignoring the accusation of the actual genocide of Ukrainians by Russian forces.

== Assessments ==
"This report comprises an independent inquiry into whether the Russian Federation bears State responsibility for breaches of the Genocide Convention in its invasion of Ukraine and concludes there are:

- 1) reasonable grounds to conclude Russia is responsible for (i) direct and public incitement to commit genocide, and (ii) a pattern of atrocities from which an inference of intent to destroy the Ukrainian national group in part can be drawn; and
- 2) the existence of a serious risk of genocide in Ukraine, triggering the legal obligation of all States to prevent genocide."

— Independent Legal Analysis of the Russian Federation's Breaches of the Genocide Convention in Ukraine and the Duty to Prevent

On 27 May 2022, a report by New Lines Institute for Strategy and Policy and Raoul Wallenberg Centre for Human Rights concluded that there were reasonable grounds to conclude that Russia breached two articles of the 1948 Genocide Convention by publicly inciting genocide through denial of the right of Ukraine as a state and Ukrainians as a nation to exist and by the forcible transfer of Ukrainian children to Russia, which is a genocidal act under article II of the convention. A Foreign Policy article acknowledged that Vladimir Putin's goal was to "erase Ukraine as a political and national entity and to Russify its inhabitants", meaning the report serves as a warning that Russia's war could become genocide.

"Russian state actors have further escalated their wilful, systematic breaches of the Genocide Convention."

— The Russian Federation’s Escalating Commission of Genocide in Ukraine: A Legal Analysis

On 26 July 2023, New Lines Institute published a follow-up report, concluding that Russia had continued and escalated its efforts to commit genocide and violated the Genocide Convention, and that state parties to the convention must increase efforts to prevent genocide if they are to fulfil their obligations. Dr Ralph Janik of Sigmund Freud Private University (Vienna) said the report is groundbreaking because it links intentionality to the committed acts, which is necessary to prove genocide.

On 23 August 2022, an assessment by the Institute for the Study of War mentions that Ukrainian children are being adopted by Russian families and considers that "the forcible transfer of children from one group to another with intent to destroy, in whole or in part, a national, ethnic, racial or religious group is a violation of the Convention on the Prevention and Punishment of the Crime of Genocide." On 30 August it reported that Russia is establishing "adaptation centres" for displaced Ukrainians in Russia, including those there involuntarily, likely setting conditions to erase their Ukrainian cultural identity and forming part of a campaign of population transfer.

Vladimir Putin's speech on the recognition of the DNR and LNR, in which he denies the historical existence of Ukraine as an independent state

Human rights law professor and former UN Special Adviser on the Prevention of Genocide, Juan E. Méndez, commented in April 2022: "I think this deserves an investigation. Of course, it would be a serious mistake to ignore the fact that many of the victims so far were clearly civilians, perhaps because they were Ukrainians—this is a national origin, a condition that fits into the partial definition of genocide... But that the fact that civilians are killed is not necessarily genocide," although whether acts are war crimes, crimes against humanity, or genocide, "all three of them require the international community to investigate, prosecute, and punish the perpetrators."

Jonathan Lieder Maynard, lecturer in international politics at King's College London, argued in April 2022 that the current evidence is too unclear to fit the strict definition of the Genocide Convention. He noted: "Perhaps these atrocities could have been genocide or could develop into genocide in the future, but the evidence is still insufficient." At the same time, Maynard drew attention to the "deeply disturbing" rhetoric of the Russian president, who denied the historical existence of Ukraine as an independent state. According to him, this illustrates the "genocidal way of thinking" when Vladimir Putin believes that Ukraine "is fake, so it has no right to exist." Maynard did recognize that there was already a significant risk "that genocide may be imminent or already underway" and suggested that "the most viable strategy for halting atrocities by Russia's troops is to help the Ukrainian army to push those troops out of Ukrainian territory." Maynard also pointed to the clearer evidence for the crime of incitement to genocide by Russia.

Director of the Center for the Study of Genocide and Human Rights at Rutgers University, Alexander Hinton, in an interview with the BBC stated on 13 April that "a lot [had] changed in [the previous] week" and that it was "quite likely" that Russian forces were carrying out genocide. Hinton stated that the genocidal rhetoric of Vladimir Putin would have to be clearly linked to the atrocities themselves in order to prove genocidal intent. In July Hinton pointed to mass deportations and forced transfer of children as evidence of Russian genocide in Ukraine, linking them to repeated genocides and other international crimes committed by Russia in the past.

=== Evidence of genocidal intent ===
"Who's to say that Ukraine will exist on the world map in two years at all?"

— Dmitry Medvedev, 15 June 2022

"The Ukraine that you and I had known, within the borders that used to be, no longer exists, and will never exist again".

— Maria Zakharova, 19 June 2022

"But if you don't want us to convince you, we'll kill you. We'll kill as many as necessary: one million, five million, or exterminate all of you".

— Pavel Gubarev, 11 October 2022

"These are the non-humans that the Ukrainian Maidan spawned. Religion in Ukraine is replaced by them with false faith and sectarianism, and the junta itself is first replaced by them."

— Head of the Duma Committee on International Affairs Leonid Slutsky, 12 December 2022

Scholars including Eugene Finkel and Timothy D. Snyder claimed that along with the acts required by the definition of genocide, there was genocidal intent, together establishing genocide.

On 5 April 2022, Holocaust scholar Eugene Finkel claimed that after Ukrainian armed forces resisted the initial phase of the 2022 Russian invasion, the aims of the invasion evolved. According to Finkel, the combined evidence of widespread war crimes, including the Bucha massacre, together with "abundant" evidence for genocidal intent, as illustrated by the essay "What Russia should do with Ukraine," published in RIA Novosti by Timofey Sergeytsev, established that genocide was taking place. Finkel wrote in 2024, "The idea that Russia seeks to destroy the Ukrainian nation as such is now generally accepted among scholars of genocide." However, a 2022 paper came to the conclusion that "despite widespread evidence of Russia’s genocidal behaviour, few scholars and lawyers believe it would be legally possible to prove Russia’s genocide in Ukraine."

On 8 April 2022, historian of Central and Eastern Europe and the Holocaust, Timothy D. Snyder, described the "What Russia Should Do with Ukraine" essay as "an explicit program for the complete elimination of the Ukrainian nation as such". According to Snyder, Sergeytsev presents the Russian definition of "Nazi" as being "a Ukrainian who refuses to admit being a Russian," and any "affinity for Ukrainian culture or for the European Union" is seen as "Nazism."

Thus, per Snyder, the document defines Russians as not being Nazis and justifies using the methods of fascism against Ukrainians while calling the methods "denazification". Snyder describes the document as "one of the most openly genocidal documents [that he had] ever seen", stating that the document calls for the majority of Ukrainians, twenty million people, to be killed or sent to labour camps. Snyder argues that Sergeytsev's document, published two days after information about the Bucha massacre became widely known, makes the establishment of genocidal intent much easier to prove legally than in other cases of mass killing.

The Guardian described Russian media, including RIA Novosti, as encouraging genocide on the basis that Ukrainian resistance to the invasion was evidence of their "Nazism." On 25 September 2023, the Independent International Commission of Inquiry on Ukraine stated that some of the rhetoric transmitted in Russian state and other media may constitute incitement to genocide.

Snyder argued that an analysis of the statements by Vladimir Putin over several decades showed that Putin had long-standing genocidal intentions against Ukrainians. Snyder stated, "To see Putin's genocidal drive is to help some of us understand where this war came from, where it's going, and why it can't be lost."

Gregory Stanton, founder and head of Genocide Watch, told the BBC that there is evidence "that the Russian army actually intends to partially destroy the Ukrainian national group," which explains the killings of civilians in addition to combatants and the military. Commenting on Vladimir Putin's pre-invasion speech in which he declared that the eight-year war in Donbas looked like genocide, Stanton pointed to what some scholars call "mirroring," in which he says, "Often the perpetrator of a genocide accuses the other side—the targeted victims—of intending to commit genocide before the perpetrator does so. This is exactly what happened in this case."

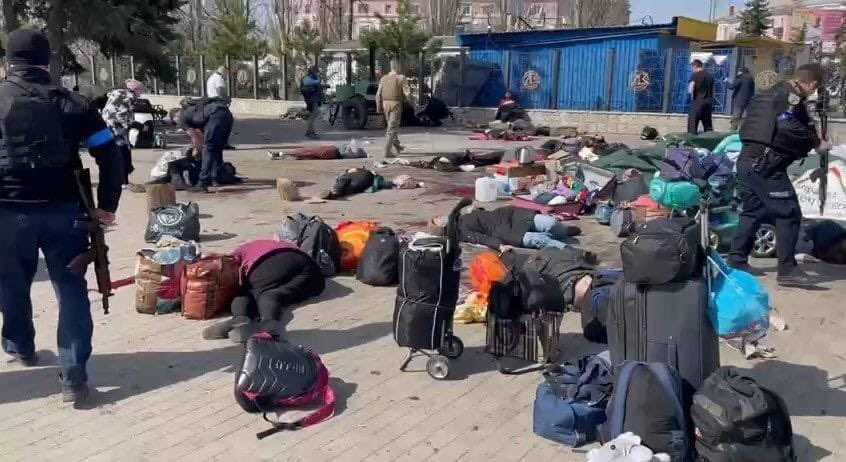
The bodies of victims of the Kramatorsk railway station attack

The German newspaper Der Tagesspiegel published a legal opinion by lawyer Otto Luchterhandt, which refers to the blockade of Mariupol and numerous crimes of the Russian military from the point of view of international law, in particular, genocide. In an interview with Deutsche Welle regarding actions indicative of genocide, he stated:

- "The first is the encirclement of the city and the fact that since the beginning of March services from the Ukrainian side have not been allowed into the city to provide the population with food and the most necessary things for life. The population is cut off from water, electricity, and heating, as well as mobile communications, which are the standard today; that is, people are cut off from communication with the outside world."
- "The second is the constant bombardment of residential areas and people, and especially medical, cultural, and other institutions that have nothing to do with power or military facilities. The most egregious is indeed an attack on a children's hospital. Here, even Russian propaganda contradicted itself when at first it said that it was fake and it didn't exist at all, and then it said that the headquarters of the battalion, right-wing radicals, and 'Nazis' were allegedly located there."
- "And from these objective facts, one can conclude that the subjective intention of the Russian troops or President Putin is to destroy and wipe the city and its population from the face of the earth. That is, the population is systematically destroyed, planned actions are being carried out, and not some random bombardments."

Regarding the fact that the term "genocide" implies the destruction of a certain ethnic group, he noted, "Yes, because we are talking about the community of the city of Mariupol as part of the Ukrainian population, that is, the Ukrainian national group. The crime refers to protection from actions to destroy not only the entire group but also part of it."

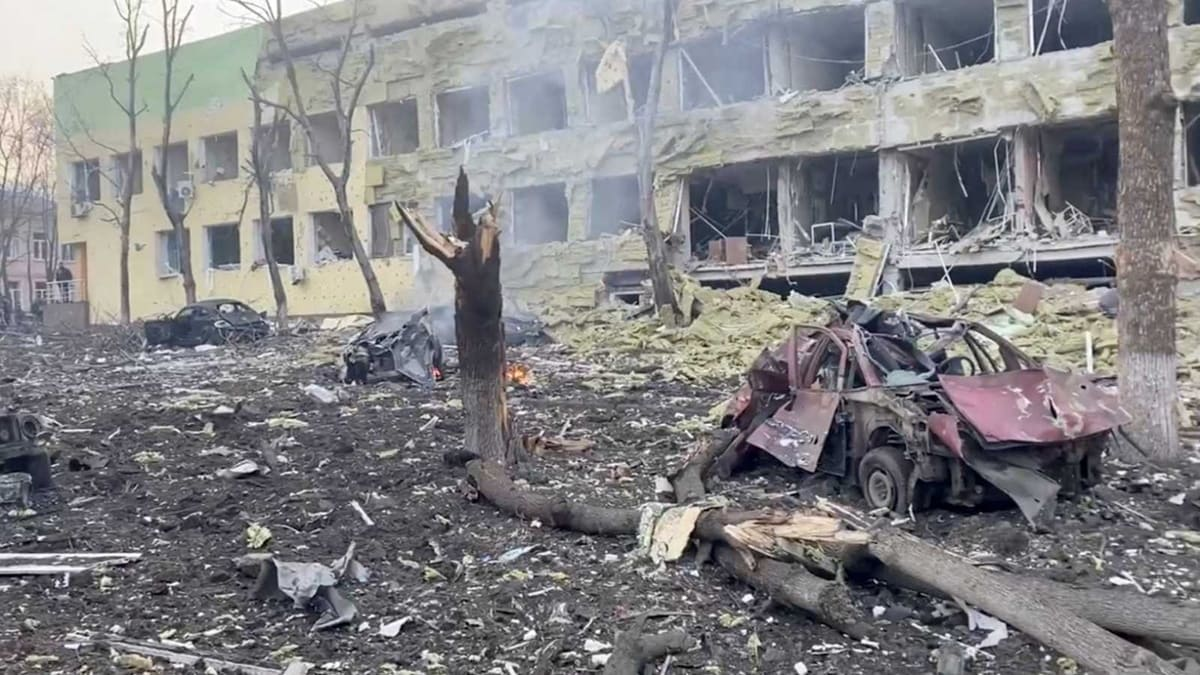
A hospital in Mariupol after an airstrike

On 5 September 2022, Genocide Watch assessed that several stages of genocide existed in Ukraine—dehumanization (stage 4), persecution (8), extermination (9), and denial (10)—due to Russia's intentional massacres of Ukrainian civilians, forced deportations, torture, sexual violence, and hate speech to incite, justify, and deny genocide.

=== The risk of genocide and obligation to prevent ===
The International Court of Justice, in its February 2007 judgment regarding genocide in Bosnia and Herzegovina, explained that "at the instant that the State learns of, or should normally have learned of, the existence of a serious risk that genocide will be committed," the Genocide Convention triggers the duty to prevent, requiring state parties to analyze the risk to inform their response. The court said the obligation "is one of conduct and not of result," requiring states to "employ all means reasonably available to them ... as far as possible" at the risk of being held responsible for failing to act.

United Nations special adviser on the prevention of genocide Alice Nderitu briefed the UN Security Council in June 2022 on the legal obligation to prevent, acknowledging the 16 March order by the International Court of Justice indicating provisional measures in the case of Ukraine v. Russian Federation, requiring Russia to "immediately suspend the military operations."

Azeem Ibrahim, director of special initiatives at the New Lines Institute, said of the Genocide Convention, "To 'prevent' always comes first," and states that those who don't act before a court determines that genocide is occurring are "essentially obfuscating and avoiding their responsibility."

== See also ==
- Holodomor genocide question
- Circassian genocide
- Chechen genocide
- Russian war crimes
- War and genocide
- List of genocides
