= Where have you been for eight years? =

Rhetorical question in Russian propaganda

"Where have you been for eight years?" (Note: "Where have you been for the last eight years?" and "Why have you been silent during the past eight years?" are also common variations of the same question.)) is a rhetorical question that has frequently appeared in Russian propaganda since the beginning of the Russian invasion of Ukraine in 2022. Recalling the beginning of the Russo-Ukrainian War in 2014, the question draws upon Russia's allegation that Ukraine had committed genocide against Russian Ukrainians during the War in Donbas, which involved eight years of sporadic fighting between Ukraine and Russian separatists. It is also intended to chastise pro-Ukraine individuals who were not sufficiently aware of the conflict before 2022. Since Russian president Vladimir Putin cited the alleged genocide of Russian Ukrainians as one of his justifications for invading Ukraine, the question has been described as one that expresses support for Russia waging war in the country. It has been extensively criticized for further promoting a false narrative because Ukraine has legally challenged Russia's allegation at the United Nations, wherein the International Court of Justice (ICJ) has found no evidence of a genocide of Russian Ukrainians in the Donbas, with the International Association of Genocide Scholars expressing the same view; Ukraine has also alleged that Russia has been committing genocide against Ukrainians since 2014.

== Variations ==
- Russian: Где вы были последние восемь лет?, romanized: Gde vy byli posledniye vosem let?, lit. 'Where were you the last eight years?'
- Russian: Почему вы восемь лет молчали?, romanized: Pochemu vy vosem let molchali?, lit. 'Why were you silent for eight years?'
- Ukrainian: Де ви були останні вісім років?, romanized: De vy buly ostanni visim rokiv?, lit. 'Where have you been for the last eight years?'

== As Russia's justification for invading Ukraine ==
Russian president Vladimir Putin's televised address on 24 February 2022 referenced the eight years that had passed since 2014 multiple times.

For eight years, for eight endless years we have been doing everything possible to settle the situation by peaceful political means. Everything was in vain. (Note: Russian: Бесконечно долгих восемь лет мы делали всё возможное, чтобы ситуация была разрешена мирно, политическими средствами. Всё напрасно.) ... The purpose of this operation is to protect people who, for eight years now, have been facing humiliation and genocide perpetrated by the Kyiv regime. (Note: Russian: Ее цель — защита людей, которые на протяжении восьми лет подвергаются издевательствам, геноциду со стороны киевского режима.)

Russian nationalists started using this phrase as their response to the "#НетВойне" ("No to war") hashtag, accusing anti-war protesters of having no concern for Russian-speaking people in the Donbas region of Ukraine. Later on, it was promoted by media celebrities within Russia, such as Nikolay Baskov, Tina Kandelaki, Masha Malinovskaya, and Dana Alexandrovna Borisova.

According to social anthropologist Alexandra Arkhipova, this argument is so common in Russian culture because it is much easier to point out the actions of an enemy instead of one's own actions, denying any form of guilt. It is also part of "whataboutism", which was a common tactic in Soviet propaganda, similar to "And you are lynching Negroes".

== Responses ==
Ukrainian journalist and TV presenter Kateryna Osadcha said that "Russia has been tearing Ukraine apart for eight years".

On 3 March 2022, Pavel Kanygin, a Russian journalist, wrote his responses for the "where have you been for eight years" questions, which also explained more about the separatists in Donbas.

=== Analysis of civilian casualties in the Donbas ===
More than 3,000 civilians were killed as a result of the war in Donbas (2014–2022), but there is no evidence to support the claim that Ukraine committed the genocide of Russian-speaking people or ethnic Russians in Ukraine. Before Russia began its full-scale invasion of Ukraine in 2022, the intensity of the hostilities in the Donbas had been steadily declining since the signing of the Minsk agreements in February 2015. For example, according to Ukrainian authorities, 50 Ukrainian soldiers were killed in clashes with Donbas separatists in 2020. By 2021, the number of victims had decreased again. According to OSCE data, about 16 civilians were injured in Donbass in 2021.

== See also ==
- Tu quoque, a logical fallacy

=== Related topics ===
- 2014 pro-Russian unrest in Ukraine
- Accession of Ukraine to the European Union
- Annexation of Crimea by the Russian Federation
- Anti-war protests in Russia (2022–present)
- Derussification in Ukraine
- Geopolitics of Russia
  - All-Russian nation
  - Eurasianism
  - Moscow, third Rome
  - Opposition to the Euromaidan
  - Russian separatist forces in Ukraine
  - Russian world
  - Ruscism
- International recognition of the Donetsk People's Republic and the Luhansk People's Republic
- Krasovsky case
- Media portrayal of the Russo-Ukrainian War
- Russian imperialism
- Russian irredentism
- Russian nationalism
- Ukraine–NATO relations
- War crimes in the Russian invasion of Ukraine
  - Allegations of genocide of Ukrainians in the Russo-Ukrainian War
  - Bucha massacre
  - Child abductions in the Russo-Ukrainian War

=== Related literature ===
- "Address concerning the events in Ukraine", 2022 speech by Vladimir Putin
- The Foundations of Geopolitics: The Geopolitical Future of Russia, 1997 book by Aleksandr Dugin
- "On conducting a special military operation", 2022 speech by Putin
- "On the Historical Unity of Russians and Ukrainians", 2021 essay by Putin
- "What Russia Should Do with Ukraine", 2022 article by Timofey Sergeytsev
