= ICC arrest warrants for Russian leaders =

2023 International Criminal Court warrants

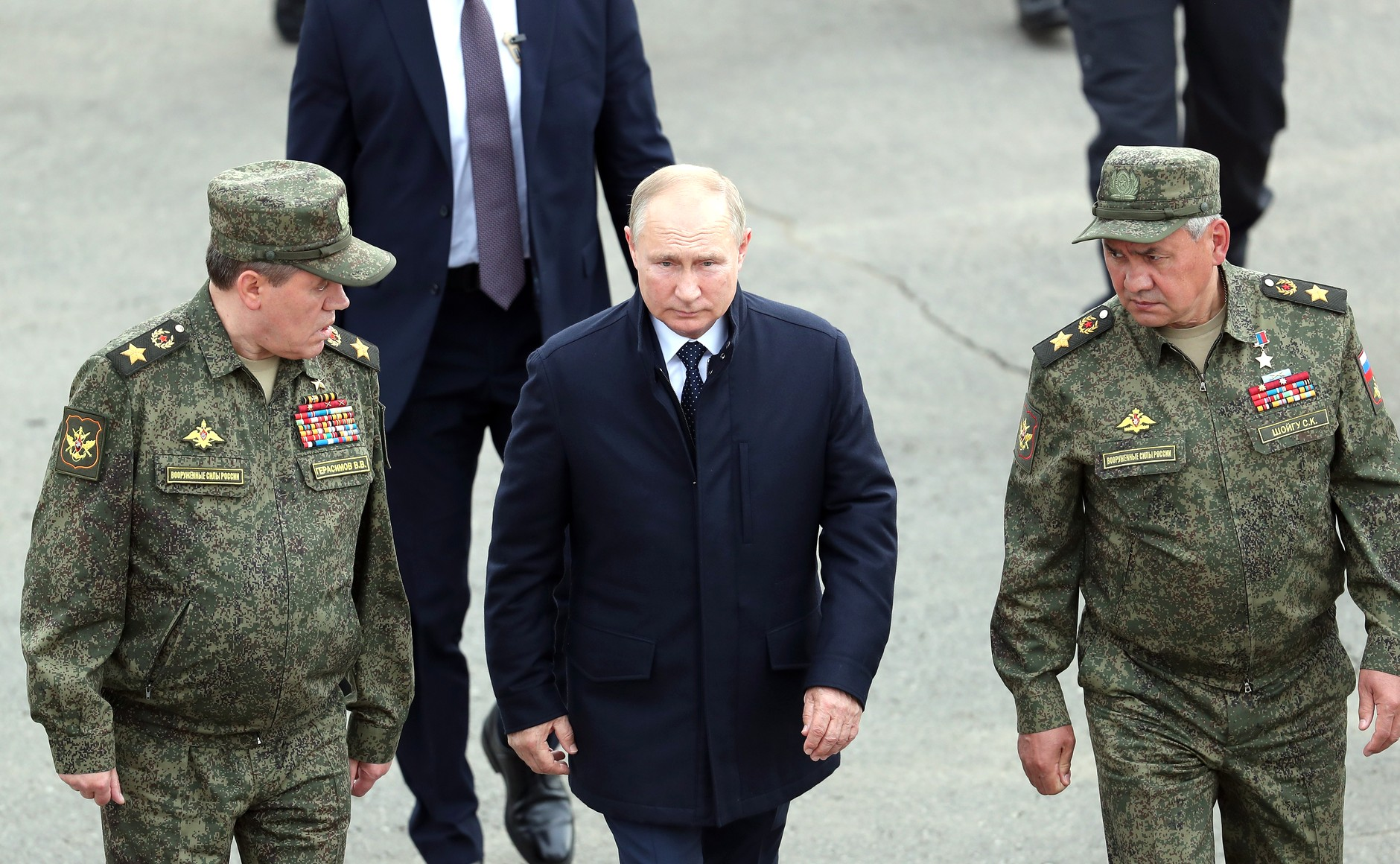
Three of the indicted individuals (left to right): Valery Gerasimov, Vladimir Putin and Sergei Shoigu

On 17 March 2023, following an investigation of war crimes, crimes against humanity and genocide, the International Criminal Court (ICC) issued arrest warrants for Vladimir Putin, the president of Russia, and Maria Lvova-Belova, Russian commissioner for children's rights, alleging responsibility for the war crime of unlawful deportation and transfer of children during the Russo-Ukrainian war. The warrant against Putin is the first against the leader of a permanent member of the United Nations Security Council.

As of June 2024, the ICC has also issued arrest warrants for Viktor Sokolov, Sergey Kobylash, Sergei Shoigu and Valery Gerasimov, all of whom are officers in the Russian military accused of directing attacks at civilian objects and the crime against humanity of "inhumane acts" under the Rome Statute.

The 125 member states of the ICC are obliged to detain and transfer any of the indicted individuals if any of them set foot on their territory.

== Background ==
=== International Criminal Court ===
The International Criminal Court (ICC) is an international court located in The Hague, Netherlands, created in 1998 by the Rome Statute. Both Russia and Ukraine signed the Statute, but neither ratified it and Russia withdrew its signature from the Statute in 2016 following a report that classified Russia's annexation of Crimea as an occupation; however, Ukraine accepted the Court's jurisdiction on its territory in 2014, allowing the Court to investigate alleged crimes committed during the course of the Russo-Ukrainian war. The court received total cooperation from the Ukrainian authorities.

=== Russo-Ukrainian War (2014–present) ===
On 4 February 2015, the Verkhovna Rada of Ukraine appealed to the ICC to investigate crimes against humanity committed by Russian forces on Ukrainian territory since 20 February 2014, and to hold accountable the responsible senior officials of the Russian Federation.

On 24 February 2022, Russia invaded and occupied parts of Ukraine in a major escalation of the Russo-Ukrainian War, which began in 2014. During the invasion, Russia has abducted thousands of Ukrainian children in the Russian-occupied territories of Ukraine and has deported them to Russia.

Ukrainian officials are investigating more than 16,000 suspected cases of forced deportation of minors. Russia has acknowledged transferring 2,000 children without guardians.

In May 2022, Putin ordered to simplify the issuance of Russian citizenship to Ukrainian orphan children. The Ministry of Foreign Affairs of Ukraine emphasized that by doing this, "Putin effectively legalized the abduction of children".

In August 2022, Gyunduz Mamedov, Deputy Prosecutor General of Ukraine in 2019–2022, said that the deportation of Ukrainian children to Russia (more than 300,000 according to the Russian Federation) is the most promising way to prove genocide.

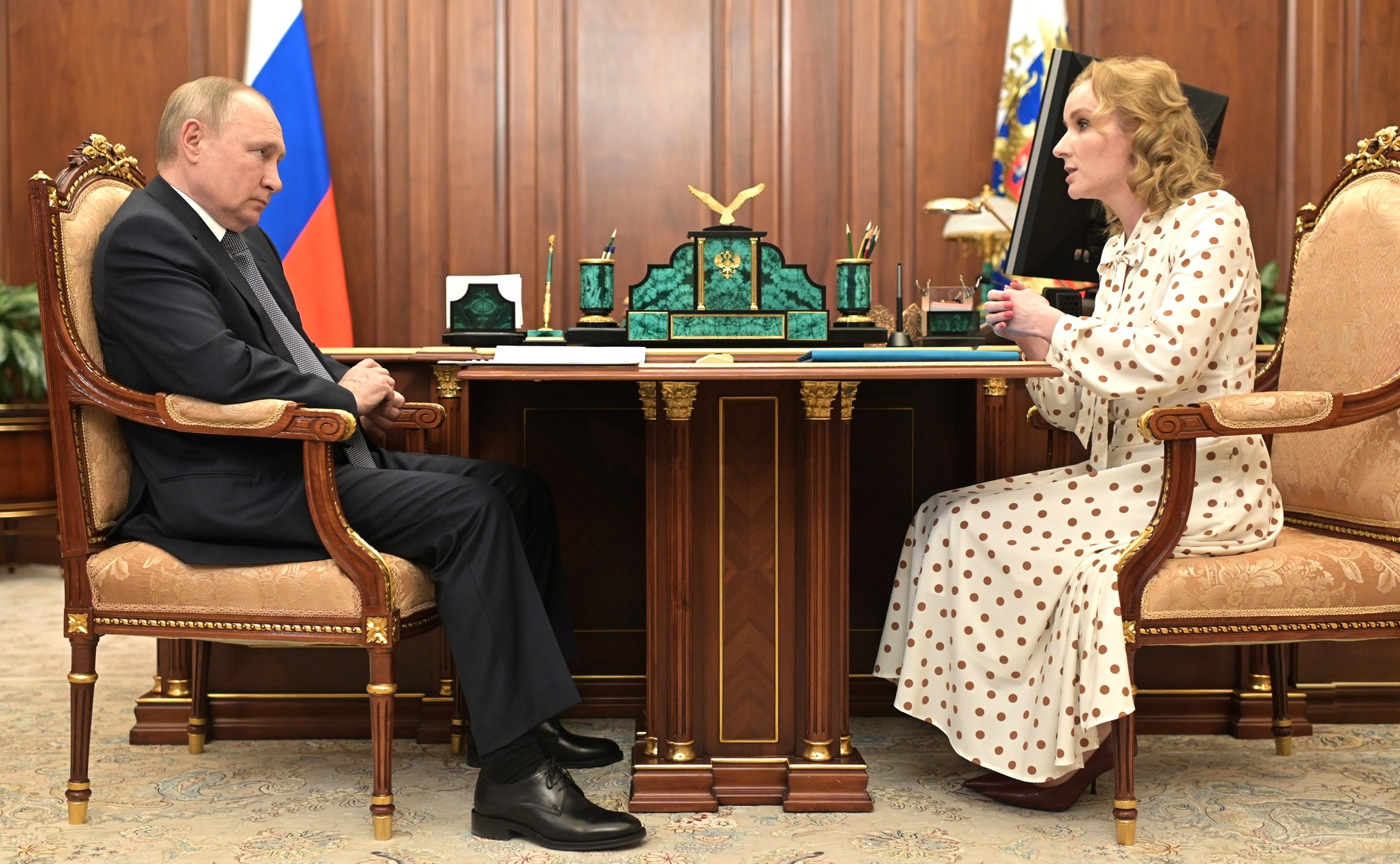
Vladimir Putin (left) speaking to Maria Lvova-Belova (right) in the Kremlin during the Russian invasion of Ukraine

In September 2022, Lvova-Belova, holding the office of the Commissioner for Children's Rights of Russia, described how the abducted Ukrainian children were initially hostile towards Russia and Putin, but after the process of "integration" the children's negative attitude gradually "turned into love".

=== Other claims against Putin ===
In May 2016, families of victims of the MH17 crash filed a claim against Russia and President Vladimir Putin in the European Court of Human Rights. MH17 was a scheduled passenger flight that was shot down by Russia-controlled forces in Ukraine, resulting in 298 civilian deaths.

In July 2021, Putin published a lengthy essay "On the Historical Unity of Russians and Ukrainians", claiming that Ukraine is an artificial entity that occupies historically Russian lands. A report by 35 legal and genocide experts cited Putin's essay as part of "laying the groundwork for incitement to genocide". Later, the Russian state-owned RIA News published the article titled "What Russia should do with Ukraine", accusing the entire Ukrainian nation of being Nazis who must wiped out and in some cases re-educated.

=== Crime of aggression ===
On 19 March 2022, the European Parliament adopted a resolution on creation of a special international tribunal for the crime of aggression by Russia and Belarus.

Ukraine, although it had not yet ratified the Rome Statute at the time, had voluntarily submitted to the Court's jurisdiction since 2013, pursuant to Article 12, paragraph 3, of the Statute. This automatically triggered the Court's jurisdiction for crimes, such as war crimes and crimes against humanity, as originally stipulated, but not literally for the crime of aggression, which was later added to the Court's jurisdiction and with a different wording of the provision.

== International law ==
From the point of view of international law, including the following treaties to which Russia is a party, the forcible deportation of minors is considered a crime against humanity:

- According to Article 50 of the 1949 Geneva Convention on the Protection of Civilian Persons in Time of War, occupants have no right to change the civil status of children;
- Russia also violated Article 7 of the UN Convention on the Rights of the Child, which guarantees the right of children to a name and the acquisition of citizenship;
- Article II of the 1948 Convention on the Prevention and Punishment of the Crime of Genocide states that "forcibly transferring children from one national, ethnic, racial or religious group to another" is an act of genocide;
- Russia ratified the Convention for the Protection of Human Rights and Fundamental Freedoms, according to which "no one shall be expelled, either individually or collectively, from the territory of the State of which he is a citizen".

The United Nations commission of inquiry characterized the deportation of Ukrainian children by Russian forces as a war crime. Several countries officially recognized the ongoing events in Ukraine as a genocide perpetrated by Russian forces. The list of countries includes Ukraine, Poland, Estonia, Latvia, Canada, Lithuania, the Czech Republic, and Ireland.

== Charges ==
Warrants were issued against Vladimir Putin and Maria Lvova-Belova on 17 March 2023. The Prosecutor of the ICC, Karim Ahmad Khan, stated that the charges against Putin and Lvova-Belova are based on reasonable grounds that the two are responsible for "unlawful deportation and transfer of Ukrainian children from occupied areas of Ukraine to the Russian Federation, contrary to article 8(2)(a)(vii) and article 8(2)(b)(viii) of the Rome Statute".

The ICC identified "at least hundreds of Ukrainian children taken from orphanages and children's care homes" by Russian forces, per Khan. Khan also stated that these deportations were done with the intention to permanently remove the children from their own country, were a violation of the Geneva Convention and amounted to war crimes.

On 5 March 2024, the ICC issued arrest warrants for senior military officials Viktor Sokolov and Sergey Kobylash, on reasonable grounds of suspecting them of the war crimes of directing attacks at civilian objects and of causing excessive incidental harm to civilians or damage to civilian objects (Articles 8(2)(b)(ii) and 8(2)(b)(iv) of the Rome Statute) and of the crime against humanity of inhumane acts under article 7(1)(k). As of March 2024, the details of the warrants were kept secret to protect witnesses and protect the investigation.

On 24 June 2024, the ICC issued arrest warrants for Russian politician and former defence minister Sergei Shoigu and Russian army general Valery Gerasimov. Shoigu and Gerasimov are accused of missile attacks on civilian targets, including power plants.

== Possible travel to a state party ==
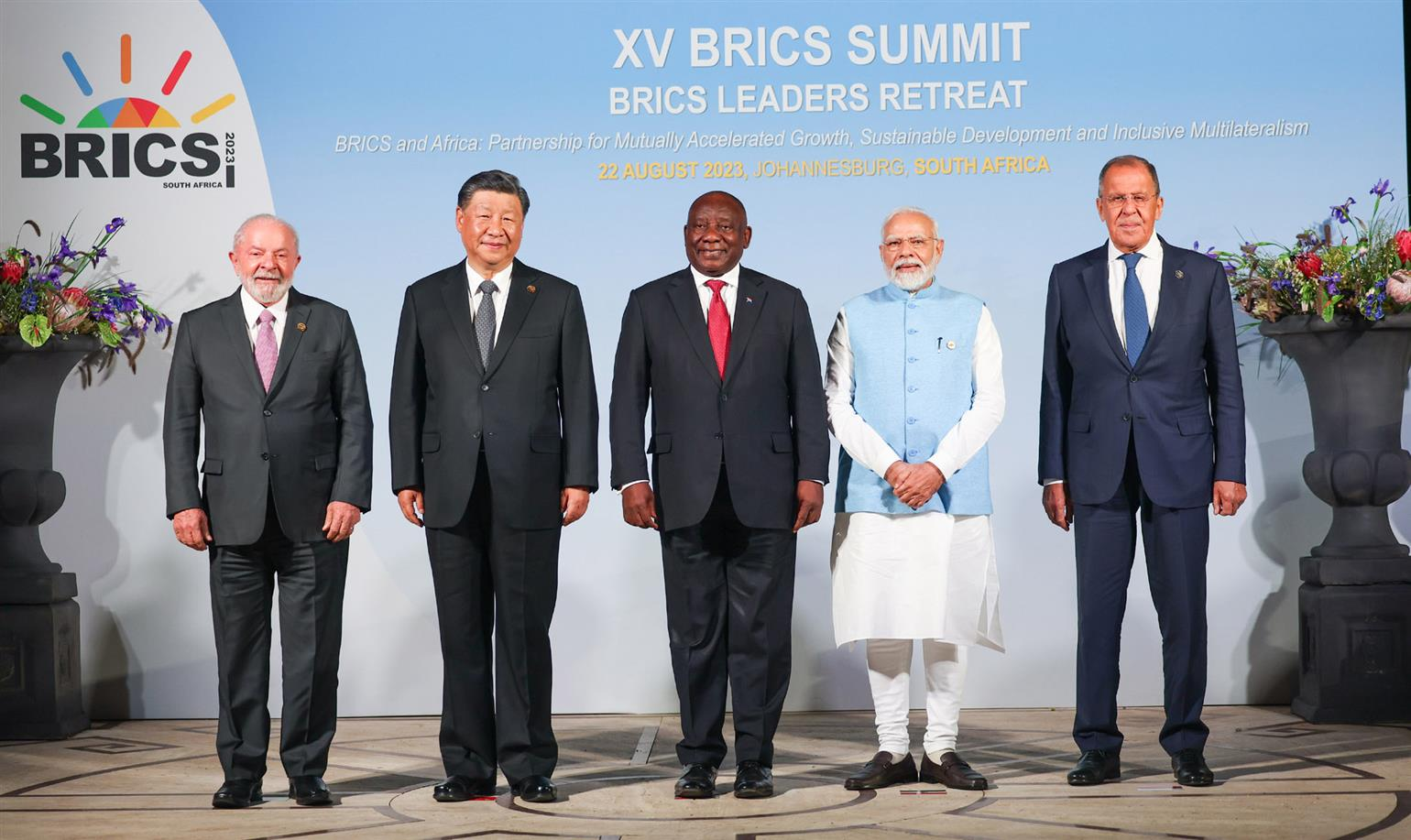
In mid-July 2023, Putin announced that he would not attend the 15th BRICS summit in Johannesburg and would instead send foreign minister Sergey Lavrov.

In December 2023, Brazilian president Luiz Inácio Lula da Silva said he would invite Vladimir Putin to the BRICS and G20 summits in Brazil. He said Putin could be arrested in Brazil, but that would be the decision of Brazil's independent courts, not his government.

On 1 June 2024, Mongolian retired politician Baabar stated that Alexander Lukashenko was visiting Mongolia to help prepare security for Putin to visit Mongolia on the 85th anniversary of the battle of Khalkhin Gol. Baabar referred to Mongolia's obligation, as a party to the Rome Statute, to arrest Putin. He stated his view that Putin's visit would be an insult to the Rome Statute and embarrassing for Mongolia. In late August 2024, Russian authorities announced that the visit would take place in early September.

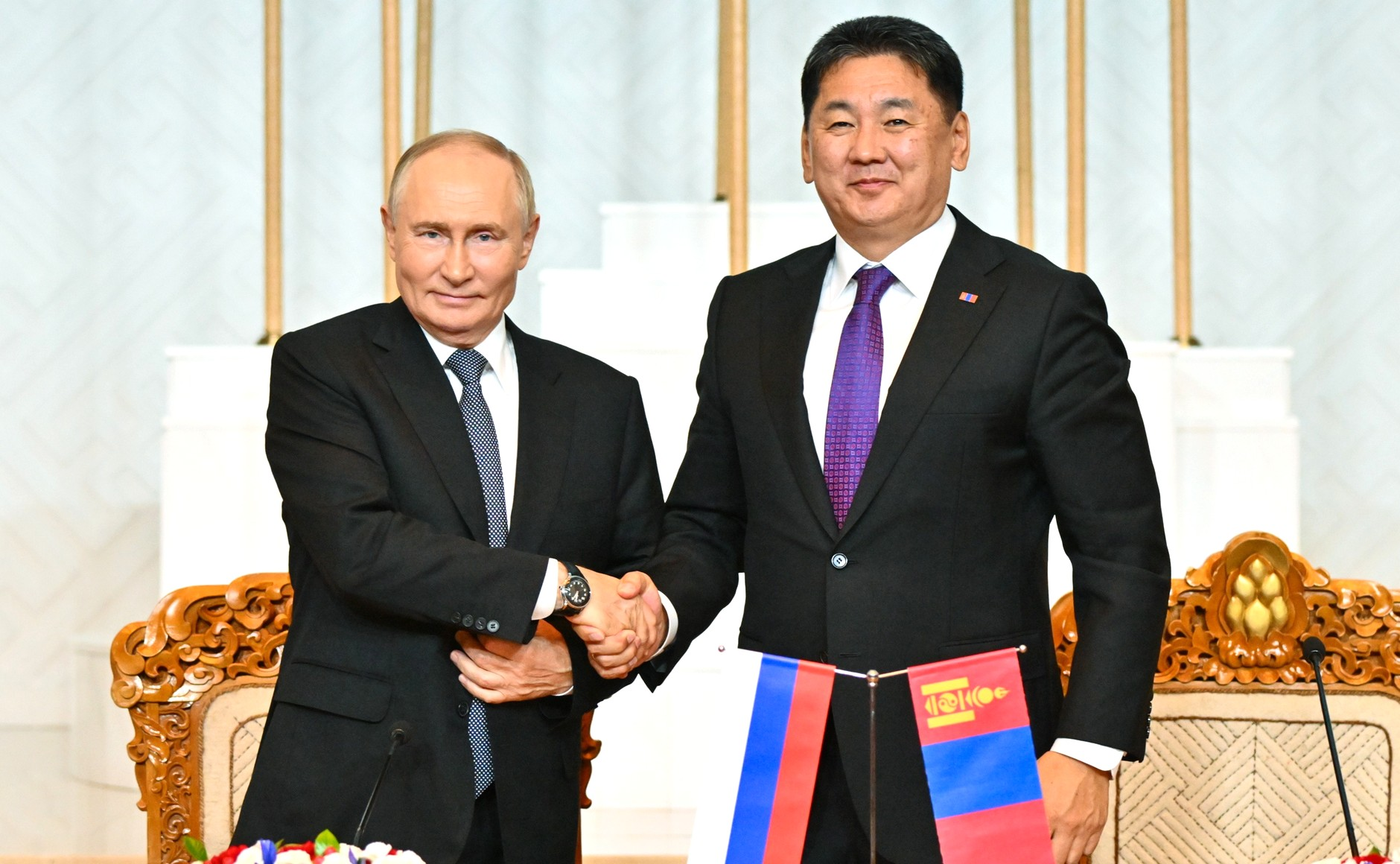
Putin and Mongolian President Ukhnaagiin Khürelsükh in Ulaanbaatar, Mongolia, 3 September 2024

On 30 August, Ukraine requested Mongolian authorities to arrest Putin if he visited the country. ICC spokesperson Fadi el-Abdalla said that states parties to the Rome Statute "have the obligation to cooperate in accordance with the Chapter IX of the Rome Statute" and that "In case of non-cooperation, ICC judges may make a finding to that effect and inform the Assembly of States Parties of it. It is then for the Assembly to take any measure it deems appropriate." However, Putin visited Mongolia on 2 September, and was not arrested. After failure to make the arrest, Mongolia was described as complicit in Putin's war crimes. In October 2024, the ICC referred Mongolia to its oversight body, the Assembly of States Parties. A request from Mongolia to the ICC to appeal this decision was rejected the following month.

Mongolia is landlocked and only borders Russia and China (both of whom are not ICC parties and are important economic partners with the country), which would make the delivery of Putin to the Hague after his hypothetical arrest politically difficult.

== Official reactions ==
=== Criticism ===
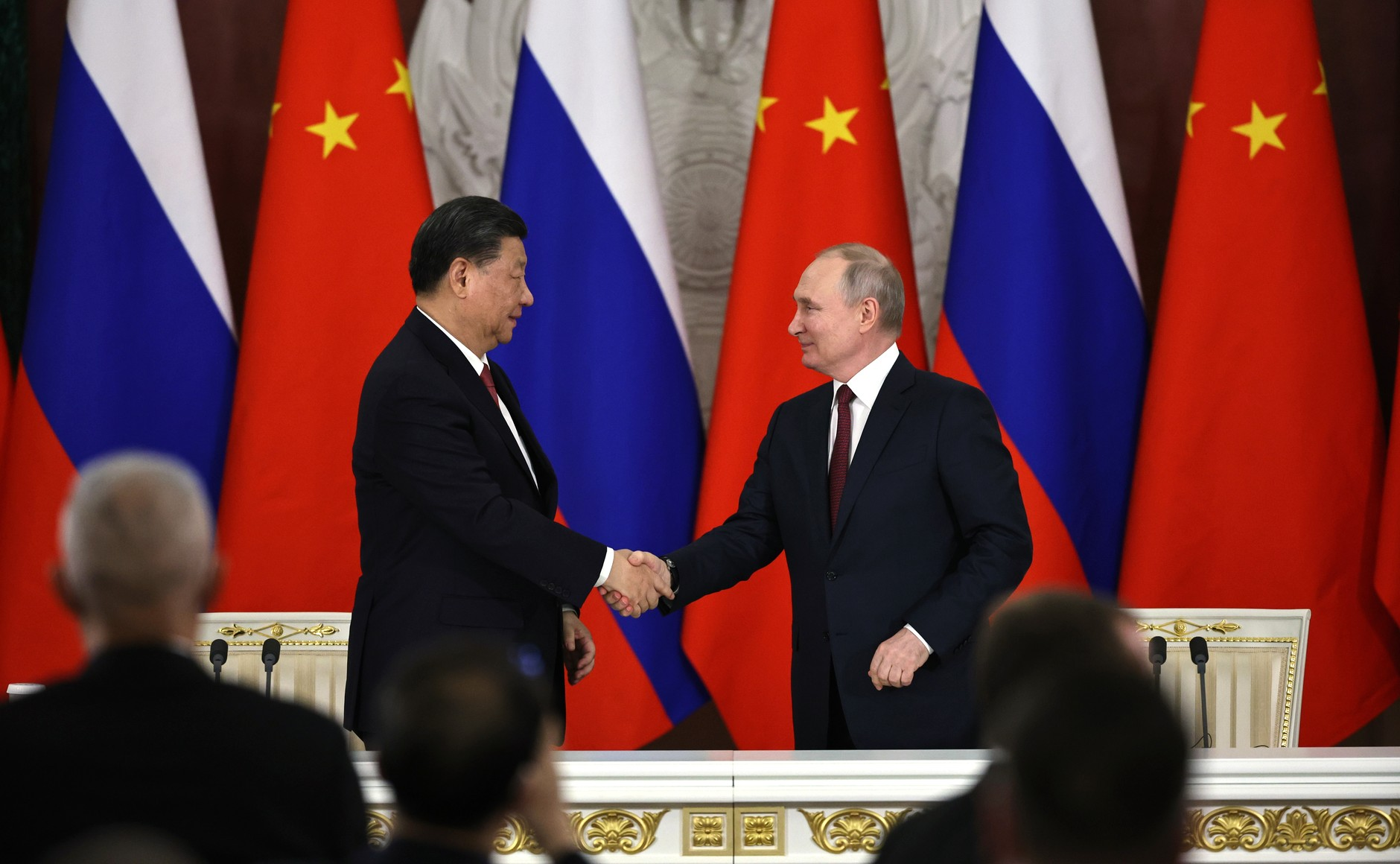
On 20–22 March 2023, Chinese president Xi Jinping visited Russia and met with Vladimir Putin. It was Putin's first international meeting since the ICC issued a warrant for his arrest.

Kremlin spokesman Dmitry Peskov called the arrest warrant "outrageous and unacceptable", and said that Russia does not recognize the jurisdiction of the ICC. Lvova-Belova told Russian state media RIA Novosti: "It's great that the international community has appreciated the work to help the children of our country, that we take them out, that we create good conditions for them, that we surround them with loving, caring people."

Calling the court "a pathetic international organization", Dmitry Medvedev, the Deputy Chairman of Russia's Security Council, warned: "Gentlemen, everyone walks under God and missiles. It is quite possible to imagine the targeted use of a hypersonic Onyx missile by a Russian ship in the North Sea strikes in the Hague court building. Unfortunately, it cannot be shot down... So, judges of the court, watch the skies closely."

Serbian President Aleksandar Vučić has criticized the arrest warrant for Putin, saying the warrant will prolong the war in Ukraine.

Ministry of Foreign Affairs of China spokesperson Wang Wenbin said at a press conference: "ICC needs to take an objective and just position, respect the jurisdictional immunity of a head of state under international law, prudently exercise its mandate in accordance with the law, interpret and apply international law in good faith, and not engage in politicization or use double standards."

South African Foreign Minister Naledi Pandor criticized the ICC for not having what she called an "evenhanded approach" to all leaders responsible for violations of international law. South Africa, which failed in its obligation to arrest visiting Sudanese President Omar al-Bashir in June 2015, invited Putin to the 15th BRICS Summit of leaders of Brazil, Russia, India, China and South Africa in August 2023. As South Africa is a signatory to the Rome Statute, the presence of Vladimir Putin remained uncertain.

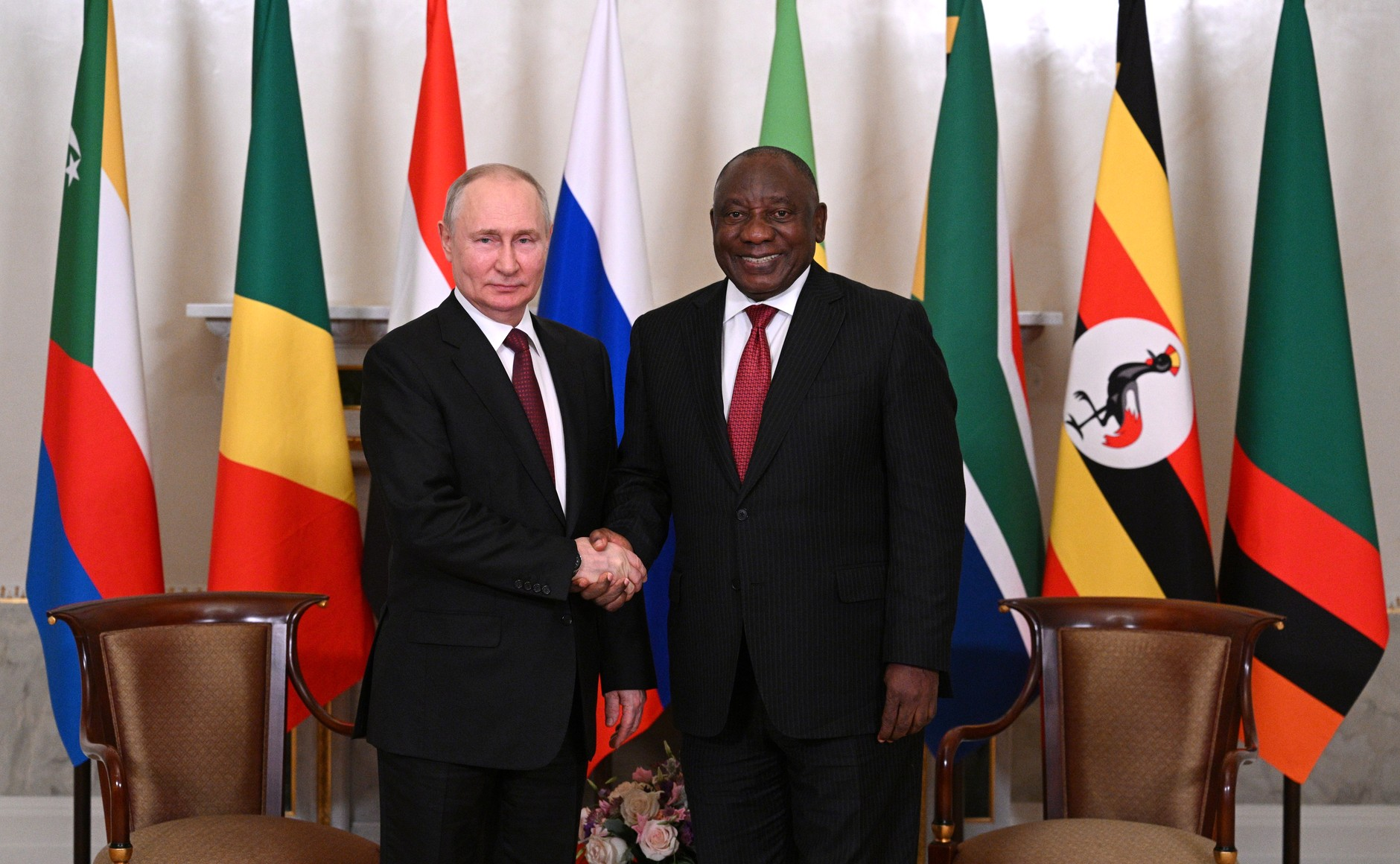
In May 2023, South Africa announced that it would grant diplomatic immunity to Vladimir Putin to attend the 15th BRICS summit despite the ICC's arrest warrant.

Western Cape premier Alan Winde criticized the ruling African National Congress (ANC) government for inviting Putin to South Africa and said that the province's officers would arrest Putin if he came to the Western Cape. South African minister Khumbudzo Ntshavheni disputed Winde's words, saying that "If President Putin is in the country and he is protected by the presidential protection service, I don't know how Premier Winde, who does not have even policing functions, will get through the presidential protection service."

In May 2023, South Africa announced that they would be giving diplomatic immunity to Putin and other Russian officials so that they could attend the 15th BRICS Summit despite the ICC arrest warrant. Former South African President Thabo Mbeki said: "Because of our legal obligations, we have to arrest President Putin, but we can't do that."

In July 2023, South African President Cyril Ramaphosa announced that Putin would not attend the summit "by mutual agreement" and would instead send Foreign Minister Sergei Lavrov.

In January 2024, South African Foreign Minister Naledi Pandor criticized the alleged double standards of the court's chief prosecutor, Karim Khan, who issued an arrest warrant for Vladimir Putin but had still not issued an arrest warrant for Israeli Prime Minister Benjamin Netanyahu over Israeli war crimes in Gaza. (Note: Khan issued an application for an arrest warrant for Netanyahu in May 2024, and the International Criminal Court issued an arrest warrant for Netanyahu in November 2024.)

The following countries that had criticized the ICC decision as of 2023: China, Cuba, Hungary, Russia, Serbia, and South Africa; with Slovakia and the United States expressing criticism in 2025.

Following the issuance of arrest warrants against Russian officials, the Russian Federation authorities opened criminal proceedings against the judges of the Court and issued counter-arrest warrants against some of them. On 12 December 2025, a Moscow court sentenced to fifteen years in prison the aforementioned prosecutor Khan, the Italian vice-president of the Court, Salvatore Aitala, and seven other members of the panel that had issued the warrants against the Russian officials, who are therefore currently wanted by the Russian justice.

=== Support ===
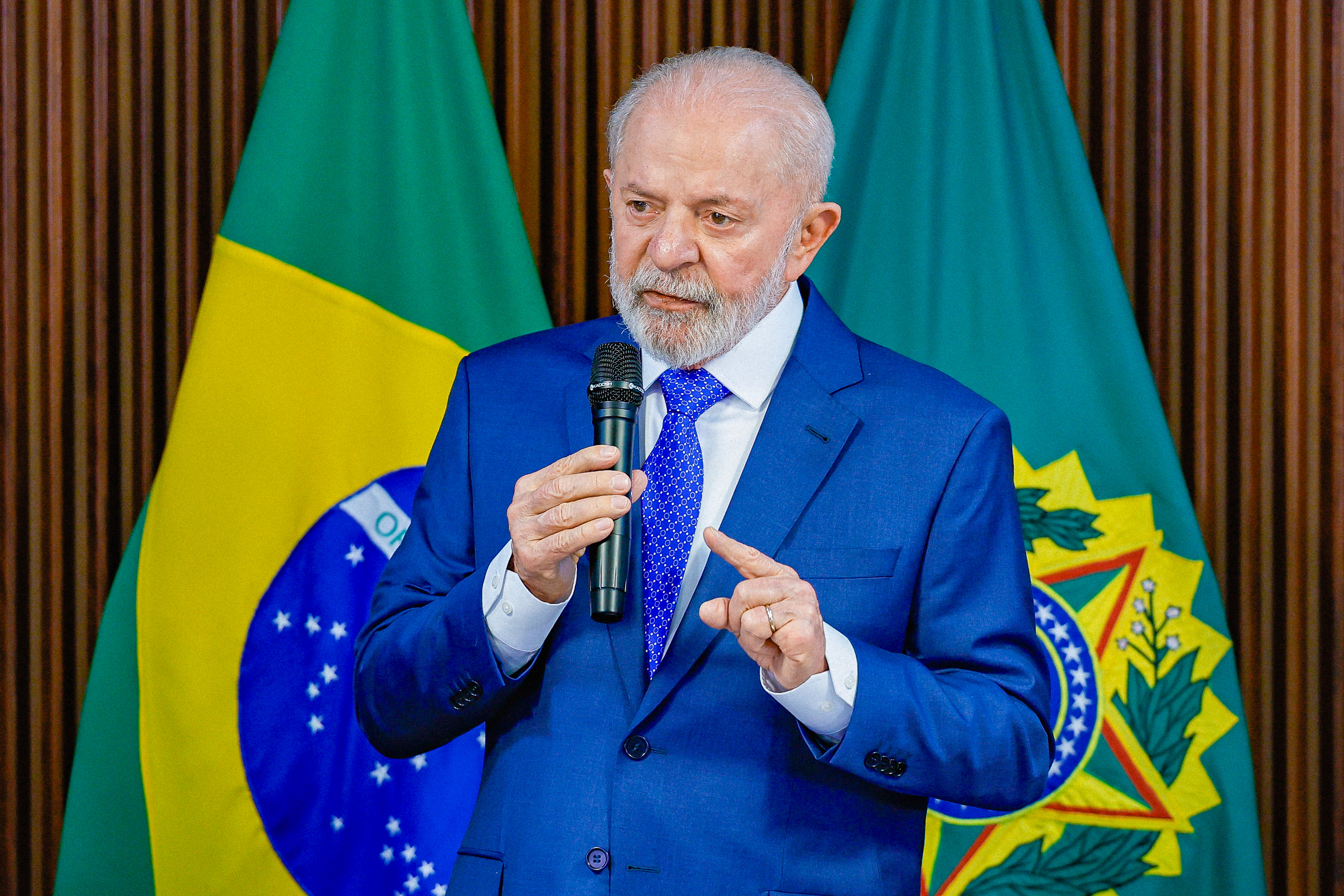
Brazilian president Luiz Inácio Lula da Silva said Putin could be arrested in Brazil.

Ukrainian foreign minister Dmytro Kuleba supported the ICC decision, tweeting: "International criminals will be held accountable for stealing children and other international crimes." Andriy Kostin, Ukraine's chief prosecutor, stated: "World leaders will think twice before shaking [Putin's] hand or sitting with Putin at the negotiating table...It's another clear signal to the world that the Russian regime is criminal".

Canadian foreign minister Mélanie Joly supported the ICC decision, tweeting: "Canada stands firmly with the people of Ukraine."

The former Leader of the Opposition and then new Prime Minister of the United Kingdom Keir Starmer supported the International Criminal Court's issuance of an arrest warrant for Putin, after he was indicted in the ICC. He also called for Russian leaders, including Putin, to be tried at The Hague for crimes against humanity.

German justice minister Marco Buschmann stated that if Putin finds himself on German territory, he will be arrested.

EU's chief diplomat Josep Borrell stated: "The EU sees the decision by the ICC as a beginning of the process of accountability and holding Russian leaders to account for the crimes and atrocities they are ordering, enabling or committing in Ukraine".

ICC prosecutor Karim Khan stated: "Those that feel that you can commit a crime in the daytime, and sleep well at night, should perhaps look at history", pointing out that no one thought Slobodan Milošević would end up in The Hague.

Brazilian foreign minister Mauro Vieira said Putin would face the risk of arrest if he entered Brazil. Brazilian president Luiz Inácio Lula da Silva reiterated this in September 2023 after initially suggesting Putin may be permitted to attend the 2024 G20 summit in Rio de Janeiro.

Australian Foreign Minister Penny Wong explicitly tied Australia's sanctions to the ICC arrest warrants issued for President Putin and Maria Lvova-Belova, emphasizing that "those supporting Russia's illegal war will face consequences." This was communicated in an official media release by Australia's Department of Foreign Affairs and Trade.

Japan noted the ICC warrants in its 2024 Diplomatic Bluebook coverage of Russia's war against Ukraine, reflecting continued support for the ICC.

The Council of Europe (blue)

The Parliamentary Assembly of the Council of Europe (PACE), an international organization with 46 member states, "welcomed the International Criminal Court's decision to issue arrest warrants for Russia's president Vladimir Putin and Children's Rights Commissioner Maria Lvova-Belova on war crimes charges, and urged their enforcement". According to the resolution by PACE, the forcible transfer and "russification" of Ukrainian children shows evidence of genocide.

List of countries that have supported the ICC decision so far as of 2023: Austria, Belgium, Bulgaria, Canada, Chile, Croatia, Cyprus, Czech Republic, Denmark, Estonia, Finland, France, Germany, Greece, Iceland, Ireland, Italy, Latvia, Liechtenstein, Lithuania, Luxembourg, Malta, Netherlands, New Zealand, Poland, Portugal, Romania, Slovakia, Slovenia, Spain, Sweden, Taiwan, Ukraine, United Kingdom, and United States.

== Analysis ==
The New York Times stated that "the likelihood of a trial while Mr. Putin remains in power [appeared] slim" due to Russia's refusal to surrender their own officials and the court not trying defendants in absentia. Former US ambassador Stephen Rapp said the warrant "makes Putin a pariah. If he travels, he risks arrest. This never goes away." According to Utrecht University professor Iva Vukusic, Putin "is not going to be able to travel pretty much anywhere else beyond the countries that are either clearly allies or at least somewhat aligned (with) Russia".

In the view of Sky News analyst Sean Bell, the arrest warrant could complicate peace negotiations aimed at ending the Russo-Ukrainian War. Al Jazeera journalist Ahmed Twaij argued that like Putin, former US President George W. Bush should be held accountable before the ICC for war crimes due to his role in the Iraq War. British journalist George Monbiot wrote in a Guardian op-ed that the ICC targeting Putin was an example of the organization's bias in favour of prosecuting crimes by non-Westerners, writing that "Africans accused of such crimes do not enjoy the political protections afforded to the western leaders who perpetrate even greater atrocities."

== See also ==
- ICC arrest warrants for Israeli leaders
- List of people indicted in the International Criminal Tribunal for Rwanda
- List of people indicted in the International Criminal Tribunal for the former Yugoslavia
- List of people indicted in the International Criminal Court
- Arrest of Rodrigo Duterte
