= Evgeny Finkel =

Political scientist and historian

- Born: Lviv, Ukraine
- Other name: Eugene Finkel
- Education: Hebrew University of Jerusalem (BA); University of Wisconsin-Madison (PhD)
- Occupations: Political scientist, historian

Evgeny Finkel or Eugene Finkel is a political scientist and historian at Johns Hopkins University who studies political violence, genocide, East European and Israeli politics, and Holocaust studies. In April 2022, Finkel claimed that after the initial phase of the 2022 Russian invasion of Ukraine was resisted by Ukrainian armed forces, the aims of the invasion evolved, and the combined evidence of widespread war crimes, including the Bucha massacre, together with genocidal intent, as illustrated by the essay What Russia should do with Ukraine published in RIA Novosti, established that genocide was taking place.

== Childhood and education ==
Evgeny Finkel was born in Lviv. Finkel and his family moved to Israel when he was 13 years old. He holds a Bachelor of Arts in political science and international relations from Hebrew University of Jerusalem and a PhD in political science from University of Wisconsin-Madison.

== Research career ==
As of 2018, Finkel's research fields included political violence, genocide, East European and Israeli politics, and Holocaust studies.

=== Russia–Israel relation in the Syrian civil war ===
In comments on the Syrian civil war in April 2018, Finkel stated that even though Israel was opposed to the government of Bashar al-Assad, which was supported by Russia, Israel and Russia had common interests in opposition to Islamic State (ISIS/ISIL) and al-Qaeda, and in preventing the war from extending beyond the borders of Syria. According to Finkel, the Israeli and Russian militaries coordinated closely in order to prevent direct conflict between their forces and to prevent a major escalation of the war.

== Media statements ==
=== 2022 Russian invasion of Ukraine ===
In early April 2022, following the Bucha massacre of the 2022 Russian invasion of Ukraine, Finkel argued that the initial intent of the invasion was unlikely to have been genocide, but that the "combination of [the] violence, widespread and deliberate, and the rhetoric" showed that the intent and actions had evolved into genocide. Finkel stated that he had often criticised governments for misusing the term "genocide". In the case of the 2022 invasion of Ukraine, he stated that the massacres demonstrated "a campaign intended to destroy Ukrainians as a national group, if not in whole, then certainly 'in part'". He argued that evidence of a switch to genocidal intent was "abundant", and that the 3 April essay, What Russia should do with Ukraine published by RIA Novosti was one of the best examples, similar to earlier statements by Russian president Vladimir Putin, and "outlin[ing] a clear plan to destroy Ukrainians and Ukraine itself". Finkel stated that the publication of the article in a major state controlled news medium was necessarily approved "from above".

Noting that the "legal definition of genocide focuses on actions taken with the intent to destroy a national or an ethnic community as such", Finkel said,

looking at Russian state TV, Russian propaganda, and statements by Russian officials, it was shocking to see them openly advertising genocide to the extent that proving intent in Ukraine's case would be the least of our concerns. As a side note, when you look at the rhetoric of multiple Israeli politicians in the current war against Hamas, you can also see genocidal statements being expressed openly, so maybe it is not just about Russia as such but something indicative of the current time and political environment. Maybe social media also has something to do with it.

Additionally, Finkel said that Western support for Israel enabled Putin to portray the support for Ukraine as "driven not by the protection of international law and human rights but by self-interest."

== Scholarly impact ==
In March 2024, genocide scholar Raz Segal and law scholar Luigi Daniele agreed that Finkel "reasonably concluded" that "the threshold from war crimes to genocide" was almost certainly crossed in Ukraine, citing Finkel's account of a "combination of official statements denying Ukraine and Ukrainians the right to exist, and mounting evidence of deliberate, large-scale targeting of Ukrainian civilians". Additionally, they argued that "[a]pplying the same standard indicated by Finkel" would lead to the conclusion that Israel was already carrying out genocide against Palestinians before the Gaza war in 2023, because "Israeli journalists and top policy makers denied Palestinians' existence, their right to a state, and collective civilian protection well before 7 October 2023".

== Works ==
- Finkel, Evgeny (2017). Ordinary Jews: Choice and Survival during the Holocaust. Princeton University Press. ISBN 978-1-4008-8492-6.
- Finkel, Evgeny; Gehlbach, Scott (2020). Reform and Rebellion in Weak States. Cambridge University Press. ISBN 978-1-108-84749-0.
- Finkel, Evgeny (2024). Intent to Destroy: Russia's Two-Hundred-Year Quest to Dominate Ukraine. Basic Books. ISBN 978-1-541-60467-4.
