= Vladimir Putin speech on invading Ukraine =

2022 televised address by Vladimir Putin

Video of the address by Vladimir Putin (with English captions), which announced the beginning of the Russian invasion of Ukraine. The announcement of the invasion is made at 20:24.

"On conducting a special military operation" (Russian: О проведении специальной военной операции, romanized: O provedenii spetsialʹnoy voyennoy operatsii) was a televised broadcast by Russian president Vladimir Putin on 24 February 2022, announcing the Russian invasion of Ukraine.

It addressed both the citizens of Russia and of Ukraine, the Armed Forces of Russia and Ukraine, and the international community. Putin announced that Russia was launching a "special military operation" to defend the Russian-speaking territories in eastern Ukraine—the Donetsk People's Republic and Luhansk People's Republic—under Article 51 of the United Nations Charter. Russian elements in the separatist regions had been at war with Ukraine since 2014, and Russia had recently become the first state to recognize them as independent. Putin claimed that Ukraine had been committing genocide against Russian speakers in the region; that Ukraine's government were neo-Nazis under Western control; and that NATO was building up military infrastructure in Ukraine, threatening Russia. These allegations were widely rejected as untrue.

Putin said that Russia was acting in self-defense, that its goal was the "demilitarization and denazification" of Ukraine, and claimed that Russia had no plans to occupy Ukrainian land. He threatened severe consequences for any country that intervened. The invasion began immediately after Putin's announcement.

== Address ==
On 24 February 2022, at 5:30 a.m. Moscow Time, state television channels broadcast a new address by Russian president Vladimir Putin. In this speech, he talked about the following points:

=== NATO-backed Ukraine as an "anti-Russia" state ===
In his speech, Putin spoke about the impossibility of reaching an agreement with NATO on equal terms and accused the military alliance of expanding to the east. Putin mentioned the enlargement of NATO often in his address, calling it and the military development of Ukraine "unacceptable". He said:

As NATO expands to the east, with every passing year, the situation for our country is getting worse and more dangerous. Moreover, in recent days the leadership of NATO has been openly talking about the need to speed up, and force the advancement of the alliance's infrastructure to the borders of Russia. In other words, they are doubling down on their position. We can no longer just watch what is happening. It would be absolutely irresponsible on our part.

Putin said Ukraine was becoming an "anti-Russia" state, with it being supplied by other NATO members with "the most modern weapons", saying:

Further expansion of the NATO infrastructure and the beginning of military development in Ukraine's territories are unacceptable for us. The problem, of course, is not NATO itself – it is only an instrument of US foreign policy. The problem is that in the territories adjacent to us – territories that were historically ours, I emphasise – an 'anti-Russia' hostile to us is being created, placed under full external control; [it] is intensively settled by the armed forces of NATO countries and is supplied with the most modern weapons.

=== Announcement of a "special military operation" in Ukraine's Donbas ===
Putin announced the start of a "special military operation" in the Donbas region, citing Article 51 of the UN Charter (on the right to self-defence), the decision of the Federation Council on the use of Russian troops in Ukraine and agreements with the Donetsk People's Republic (DPR) and Luhansk People's Republic (LPR). He said:

We have been left no other option to protect Russia and our people, but for the one that we will be forced to use today. The situation requires us to take decisive and immediate action. The people's republic of Donbas turned to Russia with a request for help... In this regard, in accordance with Article 51 of Part 7 of the UN Charter, with the sanction of the Federation Council of Russia and in pursuance of the treaties of friendship and mutual assistance ratified by the Federal Assembly on 22 February of this year with the Donetsk People's Republic and the Luhansk People's Republic, I have decided to conduct a special military operation.

Days earlier, on 21 February, Russia officially recognised the DPR and the LPR as independent states, which were agreements with the DNR and LNR referred to by Putin. They were ratified by the State Duma and the Federation Council. He said the purpose of the "operation" was to "protect the people" in the predominantly Russian-speaking region of Donbas who, according to Putin, "for eight years now, have been facing humiliation and genocide perpetrated by the Kyiv regime". Putin also stated that Russia sought the "demilitarization and denazification" of Ukraine.

=== Call to the Ukrainian people ===
Putin called on the Ukrainian military to "immediately lay down their arms and go home", saying: "All servicemen of the Ukrainian army who comply with this requirement will be able to freely leave the combat zone and return to their families. All responsibility for possible bloodshed will be entirely on the conscience of the ruling regime on the territory of Ukraine." Addressing the citizens of Ukraine, he linked Russia's actions with self-defense against the threats created for it and "an even greater disaster than the one that is happening today", saying: "No matter how hard it is, I ask you to understand this and call for interaction in order to turn this tragic page and move forward together."

Putin stated there were no plans to occupy Ukrainian territory and that he supported the right of the peoples of Ukraine to self-determination, saying:

Our plans do not include the occupation of Ukrainian territories. We are not going to impose anything on anyone by force. At the same time, we hear that recently in the West there is talk that the documents signed by the Soviet totalitarian regime, securing the outcome of World War II, should no longer be upheld. Well, what is the answer to this? ... The outcome of World War II, as well as the sacrifices made by our people on the altar of victory over Nazism, are sacred.

=== Warning against international intervention ===
At the end of the address, Putin warned other countries against intervening in the conflict, saying:

Whoever tries to interfere with us, and even more so to create threats for our country, for our people, should know that Russia's response will be immediate and will lead you to such consequences that you have never experienced in your history. We are ready for any development of events. All necessary decisions in this regard have been made. I hope that I have been heard.

== Beginning of the invasion ==
Putin's address was aired during an emergency meeting of the UN Security Council on the situation in Ukraine that began on the evening of 23 February. At the meeting itself, Vasily Nebenzya, Russia's representative to the UN, stated: "We are not carrying out aggression against the Ukrainian people, but against the group that seized power in Kyiv."

Within minutes of Putin's announcement, explosions were reported in Kyiv, Kharkiv, Odesa, and the Donbas. At about 5 am. Kyiv time, the Russian Aerospace Forces and Russian Navy launched missile and bomb attacks on Ukrainian military facilities. Simultaneously, the Russian Ground Forces entered the territory of Ukraine from several directions, including from the occupied Crimea and from the territory of Belarus, beginning the Russian invasion of Ukraine.

On 20 July 2022, The New York Times reported that Lavrov announced that Russia would respond to the increased military aid being received by Ukraine from abroad as justifying the expansion of the 'special operations' front to include military objectives in both the Zaporizhzhia and Kherson regions.

== Analysis of Putin's claims ==
=== Claims about NATO ===
Ukraine is not a member of NATO, a collective security alliance, similar in concept to the CSTO that Russia is a member of. Outside its member states, NATO only had a military presence in Kosovo and Iraq, at the request of their governments. NATO and Russia had co-operated until the 2014 Euromaidan, when Russia illegally annexed Crimea. Ukraine had been a non-aligned country when Russia occupied Crimea and invaded the Donbas in 2014. In response, Ukraine's parliament voted to end its non-aligned status and to include the goal of NATO membership in the Constitution. NATO says it is not at war with Russia; its official policy is that it does not seek confrontation, but rather supports Ukraine in "its right to self-defense, as enshrined in the UN Charter".

Between the dissolution of the Soviet Union and the Russian invasion, 14 Eastern European countries were admitted to NATO. Four of them share a border with Russia, and the last time a country bordering Russia joined NATO before the invasion was in 2004. (Note: Poland in 1999 and Estonia, Latvia, and Lithuania in 2004. Norway, a founding member of NATO, also shares a border with Russia.) In 2002, Putin said Ukraine's relationship with NATO was not Russia's concern. Ukraine applied for a NATO Membership Action Plan at the 2008 Bucharest summit. NATO refused, but Secretary-General Jaap de Hoop Scheffer declared that Ukraine will become a member in the future. Since then, Russia has opposed Ukraine joining NATO, with Putin warning it would be deemed a threat. Several analysts and officials had warned against letting eastern European countries join NATO, because of the risk that Russia would see it as a threat.

Shortly before his death in a plane crash, Russian oligarch Yevgeny Prigozhin accused the Russian military leadership of lying about NATO aggression to justify the invasion. Prigozhin was a close confidant of Putin and his Wagner Group played an important role in the invasion. Peter Dickinson of the Atlantic Council suggested the real reason Putin opposes NATO is because it "prevents him from bullying Russia's neighbors".

=== Article 51 of the UN Charter ===
Putin's reference to Article 51 of the UN Charter is regarded by a number of lawyers as incorrect. John B. Bellinger III, member of the Council on Foreign Relations, says Article 51 of the UN Charter allowed one UN member state to give military aid to another member state; but the DPR and LPR were not UN member states and were only recognized as independent by Russia. Swiss researcher of international law Nico Krisch says that Article 51 is the right to self-defense in exceptional cases, mainly when an attack on a country has already begun or is about to begin. For other situations, there is the UN Security Council and other conflict resolution mechanisms; the blurred NATO threat that Putin sees as likely cannot justify this military action. Krisch recalled that in the early 2000s, when the United States tried to introduce the concept of "preventive self-defense" as justification for the use of military force in Iraq, most countries opposed such an interpretation, and Russia was among them. Putin's right to invoke Article 51 was also rejected by the Organization for Security and Co-operation in Europe and UN Secretary-General António Guterres.

=== Allegation of genocide ===
Putin's accusation that Ukraine was committing genocide in the Donbas have been widely rejected as baseless by other countries and international organizations, including the UNESCO Commission on the Prevention of Genocide. Over 300 scholars on genocide issued a statement rejecting Russia's abuse of the term "genocide" to "justify its own violence". Ukraine brought a case before the International Court of Justice (ICJ) to challenge Russia's claim. The ICJ said it had not seen any evidence of genocide committed by Ukraine.

Altogether, about 14,300 people were killed in the Donbas War, both soldiers and civilians. According to the Office of the United Nations High Commissioner for Human Rights (OHCHR), 6,500 were Russian proxy forces, 4,400 were Ukrainian forces, and 3,404 were civilians on both sides of the frontline. The vast majority of civilian deaths were in the first year, and the death rate in the Donbas War was actually falling before the 2022 Russian invasion: in the year before the invasion, there were 25 conflict-related civilian deaths, over half of them from mines and unexploded ordnance.

=== Allegation of neo-Nazism ===
Putin's claim that Ukraine was a neo-Nazi state has been widely rejected. The world's leading scholars of Nazism and the Holocaust (including Jared McBride, Francine Hirsch, Timothy D. Snyder, Omer Bartov, Christoph Diekman, and others) published a statement rejecting Putin's claims, which was signed by hundreds of historians and scholars of the subject. It says:

We strongly reject the Russian government's ... equation of the Ukrainian state with the Nazi regime to justify its unprovoked aggression. This rhetoric is factually wrong, morally repugnant and deeply offensive to the memory of millions of victims of Nazism and those who courageously fought against it.

The authors say that Ukraine "has right-wing extremists and violent xenophobic groups" like any country, but "none of this justifies the Russian aggression and the gross mischaracterization of Ukraine". The Auschwitz-Birkenau State Museum likewise condemned Putin's accusations.

Putin's claims of Nazism against Ukraine are partly an attempt to drum-up support for the war. Russian propaganda has framed it as a continuation of the Soviet Union's "Great Patriotic War" against Nazi Germany, "even as Russia supports extreme-right groups across Europe". The Washington Post commented that "the rhetoric of the fight against fascism resonates deeply in Russia, which suffered huge losses in the fight against Nazi Germany".

Ukraine, like many countries, has a far-right fringe, but analysts say Putin greatly exaggerated far-right influence in Ukraine; it does not have widespread support in the government, military, or electorate. In the last election, far-right parties failed to win a seat in Ukraine's parliament. Ukraine's Azov Brigade, which had far-right origins, was a focus of Kremlin propaganda. However, by the time of the invasion, sources say that the brigade had been depoliticized. Since 2015, Nazi and communist symbols have been banned in Ukraine, and there are examples of Ukraine prosecuting neo-Nazis.

Ukraine's president, Volodymyr Zelenskyy, is Jewish and has relatives who were victims of the Holocaust. He is also a Russian speaker and won the 2019 Ukrainian presidential election by a wide margin.

Ulrich B. Schmid, professor of Russian culture and society at the University of St. Gallen in Switzerland, called Putin's allegation "despicable", and noted that Russia itself has many prominent far-right groups. Some Russian units who took part in the invasion are themselves linked to neo-Nazism, such as the Rusich Group and Wagner Group. Russian far-right groups also played a major role among the Russian proxy forces in Donbas.

=== Threat of nuclear warfare ===
Josep Borrell, the EU representative for foreign affairs and security policy, as well as Brookings Institution senior fellow Michael E. O'Hanlon and Associated Press vice president John Daniszewski, assessed Putin's words about a possible response to intervention in the conflict as a threat to use nuclear weapons.

On 27 February, Putin ordered the Minister of Defense to put the strategic deterrence forces into a special mode of combat duty. The reason for this was what he called the "unfriendly actions" of Western countries in the economic sphere, as well as the "aggressive statements" of their leaders.

== International condemnation ==
NATO Secretary-General Jens Stoltenberg issued a statement condemning "Russia's reckless and unprovoked attack on Ukraine, which puts at risk countless civilian lives. Once again, despite our repeated warnings and tireless efforts to engage in diplomacy, Russia has chosen the path of aggression against a sovereign and independent country."

US president Joe Biden issued a statement saying that Russia had launched "an unprovoked and unjustified attack" on the Ukrainian people.

In the statement, Biden said: "President Putin has chosen a premeditated war that will bring a catastrophic loss of life and human suffering." He said: "Russia alone is responsible for the death and destruction this attack will bring, and the United States and its Allies and partners will respond in a united and decisive way. The world will hold Russia accountable."

As news of the announcement broke, UN Secretary-General António Guterres asked Putin to halt the invasion, telling the Russia leader, "President Putin, stop your troops from attacking Ukraine. Give peace a chance, too many people have already died."

== See also ==
=== Related topics ===
- 2014 pro-Russian unrest in Ukraine
- Accession of Ukraine to the European Union
- Annexation of Crimea by the Russian Federation
- Anti-war protests in Russia (2022–present)
- Derussification in Ukraine
- Geopolitics of Russia
  - All-Russian nation
  - Eurasianism
  - Moscow, third Rome
  - Opposition to the Euromaidan
  - Russian separatist forces in Ukraine
  - Russian world
  - Ruscism
- International recognition of the Donetsk People's Republic and the Luhansk People's Republic
- Krasovsky case
- Media portrayal of the Russo-Ukrainian War
- Russian imperialism
- Russian irredentism
- Russian nationalism
- Ukraine–NATO relations
- War crimes in the Russian invasion of Ukraine
  - Allegations of genocide of Ukrainians in the Russo-Ukrainian War
  - Bucha massacre
  - Child abductions in the Russo-Ukrainian War

=== Related literature ===
- "Address concerning the events in Ukraine", 2022 speech by Vladimir Putin
- The Foundations of Geopolitics: The Geopolitical Future of Russia, 1997 book by Aleksandr Dugin
- "On the Historical Unity of Russians and Ukrainians", 2021 essay by Putin
- "Where have you been for eight years?", a phrase used during the 2022 Russian invasion of Ukraine
- "What Russia Should Do with Ukraine", 2022 article by Timofey Sergeytsev
