= On the Historical Unity of Russians and Ukrainians =

2021 essay by Russian president Vladimir Putin

On the historical unity of Russians and Ukrainians
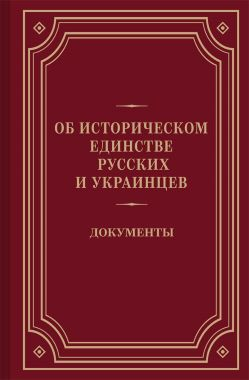
- Cover of first book edition
- Author: Vladimir Putin
- Original title: Об историческом единстве русских и украинцев
- Language: English; Russian; Ukrainian
- Genre: Propaganda; Pseudohistory
- Publisher: Office of the President of Russia
- Publication date: 12 July 2021
- Publication place: Russia

On the Historical Unity of Russians and Ukrainians (Note: Russian: Об историческом единстве русских и украинцев, romanized: Ob istoricheskom yedinstve russkikh i ukraintsev; Ukrainian: Про історичну єдність росіян та українців, romanized: Pro istorychnu yednist' rosiyan ta ukrayintsiv) is an essay by Russian president Vladimir Putin published on the Kremlin.ru website on 12 July 2021.

The essay was published shortly after the end of the first of two buildups of Russian forces preceding the full-scale invasion of Ukraine in February 2022. In the essay, Putin describes his views on Ukraine and Ukrainians.

According to RBK Daily, the essay is included in the list of mandatory works to be studied by the Russian military. In 2021, the essay was also published as a book with no author indicated.

== Contents ==
In the essay, Putin argues that Russians and Ukrainians, along with Belarusians, are one people, belonging to what has historically been known as the triune Russian nation. To support the claim, he describes in length his views on the history of Russia and Ukraine, concluding that Russians and Ukrainians share a common heritage and destiny.

Noting the large number of ethnic Russians in Ukraine, Putin compares "the formation of an ethnically pure Ukrainian state, aggressive towards Russia" to a use of weapons of mass destruction against Russians.

Putin openly questions the legitimacy of Ukraine's contemporary borders, which are based on the Ukrainian SSR's 1954–1991 borders. According to Putin, modern-day Ukraine occupies historically Russian lands, and is an "anti-Russia project" created by external forces since the seventeenth century, and of administrative and political decisions made during the Soviet Union (a BBC article traced the term "anti-Russia project" to some Russian conspiratorial writing of 2011–2013). He also discusses the Russo-Ukrainian War, maintaining that "Kiev simply does not need Donbas".

Putin places blame for the current crisis on foreign plots and anti-Russian conspiracies. According to Putin, the decisions of the Ukrainian government are driven by a Western plot against Russia as well as by "followers of Bandera".

Putin ends the lengthy essay by asserting Russia's role in modern Ukrainian affairs.

According to an April 2023 investigative report by the Russian website Vyorstka, one draft of the essay included a direct threat of military action against Ukraine, although it was removed from the final version.

== Follow-ups ==
A few days later, the Kremlin website published an interview with Putin about the article.

Several months later, Dmitry Medvedev, the deputy chairman of the Security Council of Russia, also published an article on Ukraine in the Russian daily Kommersant. In it, he agrees with Putin's essay, and declares that there will be no negotiations with Ukraine until the Ukrainian government is replaced. The article, endorsed by the Kremlin, was criticized for its denigrating and antisemitic tone.

Vladislav Surkov, the personal adviser (2013–2020) of Putin, also published an article concerning Ukraine and other ex-USSR territories on the website Aktualnye Kommentarii. In the article, he questions the legitimacy of the western border of Russia (including the borders with Ukraine and the Baltic states), claiming that it was born out of the Treaty of Brest-Litovsk, arguing that Russia should abolish the "wicked peace" that keeps it confined by the borders.

In a speech on 21 February 2022, following the deployment of Russian troops in the Donetsk and Luhansk People's Republics, Putin said that "modern Ukraine was wholly and fully created by Bolshevik, communist Russia". Sarah Rainsford wrote in BBC News that Putin's speech was "rewriting Ukraine's history", and that his focus on the country was "obsessive". Vitaly Chervonenko from the BBC noted how carefully Putin kept silent about the independent Ukrainian state formations of 1917–1920 and Kyiv's war with Lenin's Bolshevik government, whose purpose was to include Ukraine in Bolshevik Russia.

Of course, Lenin did not create Ukraine. In 1918, he started a war against an independent Ukrainian state and then replaced it with a puppet state called the Ukrainian Soviet Socialist Republic. What Lenin really created was the Russian Federation, a state that received its constitution in 1918 and became part of the USSR four years later. In 1991, Yeltsin removed this entity created by Lenin from the USSR, thereby contributing to the collapse of the Union. Lenin was the creator of modern Russia, not Ukraine, and should be considered as such.

— Professor of Ukrainian history at Harvard University, Serhii Plokhy.

Plokhiy recalled that Lenin invaded Ukraine and then took away even formal independence from Ukraine by integrating it into the Soviet Union in 1922.

The article "The Advance of Russia and of a New World" by Petr Akopov was briefly published in several Russian state news sites on 26 February 2022, two days after Russian forces openly invaded Ukrainian-controlled territory, but was soon deleted. Its original publication on RIA Novosti at precisely 8:00 a.m. suggests it may have been automatically published by mistake. The article celebrates the "gathering the Russian world, the Russian people together—in its entirety of Great Russians, Belarusians and Little Russians", and Vladimir Putin's historic responsibility for "resolution of the Ukrainian question".

The same state-owned RIA Novosti published another article in April 2022, this time without any backtracking. Titled "What Russia Should Do with Ukraine", the article openly accused the entire Ukrainian nation of being Nazis who must be wiped out and in some cases re-educated.

On 29 March 2022, Rossiyskaya Gazeta, the official government gazette of the Russian government, published an article that claims that European elites support the Ukrainian Nazis because of their bitterness over the loss in the Second World War. The article quotes Ukrainian priest Vasiliy Zenkovskiy, "Ukraine must become a part of Russia, even if Ukrainians are against it".

The article was also almost simultaneously published in German in journal Osteuropa under the title Über die historische Einheit der Russen und der Ukrainer. (Vladimir Putin is fully fluent in written and spoken German).

== Reactions ==
Volodymyr Zelenskyy, the president of Ukraine, criticized the essay on 13 July, comparing Putin's view on the brotherhood between the nations with the story of Cain and Abel. Former president Petro Poroshenko also sharply criticized the essay, describing it as a counterpart of Hitler's Sudetenland speech. Former president of Estonia Toomas Hendrik Ilves similarly likened it to Hitler's 1938 rhetoric justifying the partition of Czechoslovakia. Ukraine's envoy to United Nations Sergiy Kyslytsya commented, "fables about the 'one people' ... have been refuted in Donbas battlefields".

According to the Institute of History of Ukraine, the essay represents the historical views of the Russian Empire. The Ukrainian World Congress compares Putin's view of Ukraine "as a non-nation" to that of Joseph Stalin under whose watch at least five million Ukrainians perished during the Holodomor.

The Carnegie Endowment for International Peace called the essay a "historical, political, and security predicate for invading [Ukraine]". The Stockholm Free World Forum senior fellow Anders Åslund branded the essay as "one step short of a declaration of war." According to Foreign Policy, the essay is a "key guide to the historical stories that shape Putin's and many Russian's attitudes". Historian Timothy Snyder described Putin's ideas as imperialism, while British journalist Edward Lucas described the essay as historical revisionism. Other observers noted that the Russian leadership at the time had a distorted view of modern Ukraine and its history.

In Romania, a part of the essay caused outrage. The fragment in question describes how, in 1918, the Kingdom of Romania had "occupied" (and not united with) the geographical region of Bessarabia, part of which is now in Ukraine. Romanian media outlets such as Adevărul and Digi24 commented on Putin's statements and criticized them. Remarks were also made regarding Northern Bukovina, another former Romanian territory now part of Ukraine. Alexandru Muraru, then a deputy of Romania, also replied to Putin's essay, declaring that Bessarabia was not occupied but "reattached" and "reincorporated" following "democratic processes and historical realities". Muraru also commented on Northern Bukovina.

A report by 35 legal and genocide experts cited Putin's essay as part of "laying the groundwork for incitement to genocide: denying the existence of the Ukrainian group".

In his 2022 Yale lecture, Timothy Snyder argues that Putin's essay is a piece of "bad history".

== See also ==
=== Related topics ===
- 2014 pro-Russian unrest in Ukraine
- Accession of Ukraine to the European Union
- 2014 Russian annexation of Crimea
- Anti-war protests in Russia (2022–present)
- Budapest Memorandum of 1994
- Derussification in Ukraine
- Geopolitics of Russia
  - All-Russian nation
  - Eurasianism
  - Moscow, Third Rome
  - Opposition to the Euromaidan
  - Russian separatist forces in Ukraine
  - Russian world
  - Ruscism
  - Nostalgia for the Soviet Union
- International recognition of the Donetsk People's Republic and the Luhansk People's Republic
- Krasovsky case
- Media portrayal of the Russo-Ukrainian war
- Russian imperialism
- Russian irredentism
- Russian nationalism
- Ukraine–NATO relations
- War crimes in the Russo-Ukrainian war (2022–present)
  - Allegations of genocide of Ukrainians in the Russo-Ukrainian war
  - Bucha massacre
  - Child abductions in the Russo-Ukrainian war

=== Related literature ===
- "Address concerning the events in Ukraine", 2022 speech by Vladimir Putin
- The Foundations of Geopolitics: The Geopolitical Future of Russia, 1997 book by Aleksandr Dugin
- "On conducting a special military operation", 2022 speech by Putin
- "What Russia Should Do with Ukraine", 2022 article by Timofey Sergeytsev
- "Where have you been for eight years?", a phrase used during the 2022 Russian invasion of Ukraine
