= What Russia Should Do with Ukraine =

2022 Russian op-ed inciting genocide in Ukraine

"What Russia Should Do with Ukraine" (Russian: Что Россия должна сделать с Украиной, romanized: Chto Rossiya dolzhna sdelat s Ukrainoy), (Note: Alternatively, rendered in question format, "What Should Russia Do with Ukraine?") is an article written by Timofey Sergeytsev and published by the Russian state-owned news agency RIA Novosti. The article calls for the full destruction of Ukraine as a state, as well as the full destruction of the Ukrainian national identity in accordance with Russia's aim to accomplish the "denazification" of the latter.

It was published on 3 April 2022 in the context of the ongoing Russian invasion of Ukraine, on the same day as the bodies of dozens of civilians were discovered after the retreat of Russian forces from Ukrainian city of Bucha. The article caused international criticism and outrage and has been condemned as evidence of genocidal intent.

== Content ==
The article advocates for "brutal censorship" of the Ukrainian culture and large-scale "de-ukrainization" of Ukrainians on the territories occupied by Russia in the 2022 invasion of Ukraine.

Sergeytsev insists that Ukraine's ethnocentrism is an artificial perversion, that Ukraine's existence is "impossible" as a nation-state, and that the word "Ukraine" itself cannot be allowed to exist. According to the author, Ukraine should be dismantled and replaced with several states under direct control by Russia. He adds that the "ethnic component of self-identification" of Ukraine would also be rejected after its occupation by Russia.

The author claims that "most likely the majority" of Ukrainian civilians are "passive Nazis and Nazi accomplices. They supported the Nazi authorities and pandered to them", thus, they "technically" cannot be punished as war criminals, but can be subjected to "denazification" and are to blame. While Sergeytsev notes that there are no Nazi parties, symbols, racist laws, or other evidence of actual Nazism, he counters that by asserting that "Ukrainian Nazism is unique due to its amorphism and ambiguity", which is, per Timothy Snyder, equivalent to a "special Russian definition of Nazism". The author asserts that Banderites are actually marginal to "Ukro-nazism", and that the real menace is Pro-Europeanism.

Sergeytsev claims that the "Banderite" elite has to be "liquidated", and adds that the remaining Ukrainians must "assimilate the experience" of the war "as a historical lesson and atonement for [their] guilt". After the war, forced labor, imprisonment and the death penalty would be used as punishment. After that, the population would be "integrated" into "Russian civilization". The author describes the planned actions as a "decolonization" of Ukraine.

According to Anton Shekhovtsov, writing in Haaretz, the article is an expanded version of a 2016 article by Russian columnist Alexander Zhuchkovsky, who is linked to Russian Imperial Movement. In that article, Zhuchkovsky called for the dehumanization of Ukrainians, saying "It is natural and right, as we are fighting not against people but against enemies, [...] not against people but against Ukrainians."

== Author ==
The author of the text, Timofey Sergeytsev, advised Victor Pinchuk's projects from 1998 to 2000, including Pinchuk's 1998 parliamentary election campaign in Ukraine, and was a member of the Board of Directors of Interpipe Group.

He was born in 1963 in Chelyabinsk, Soviet Russia. He studied at the Moscow Institute of Physics and Technology in 1980, where he was a student of Georgy Shchedrovitsky.

In 1999, he worked for the presidential campaign of then incumbent Ukrainian president Leonid Kuchma. In September 2004, he was a consultant to Viktor Yanukovych. In 2010, he worked with Arseniy Yatsenyuk. During Russia’s 2012 presidential elections, he worked as a consultant for Russian billionaire Mikhail Prokhorov and his party Right Cause. In 2012, Sergeitsev co-produced the Russian feature film Match which was criticized for Ukrainophobia. In 2014, it was banned on the territory of Ukraine as propaganda.

According to Der Tagesspiegel, Sergeitsev supports the (since 2015) pro-Putin (formerly opposition) political party Civic Platform financed by one of the oligarchs from Putin's inner circle. According to Euractiv, Sergeitsev is "one of the ideologists of modern Russian fascism".

== Reactions ==
=== Russian domestic reaction ===
Dmitry Medvedev, the current deputy chairman of the Security Council of Russia, as well as former president of Russia between 2008 and 2012 and former prime minister of Russia between 2012 and 2020, reiterated the main points of the article a few days after its publication. According to Medvedev, "a passionate segment of Ukrainian society has been praying to the Third Reich", Ukraine is a Nazi state like the Third Reich that must be "denazified" and "eradicated", and the result will be a collapse of Ukraine as a state. Medvedev claims that the collapse is a path towards "open Eurasia from Lisbon to Vladivostok". Medvedev has continued this rhetoric, posting lengthy diatribes against Ukraine aimed at domestic audiences. For example, in his "On Fakes and True History", he claimed that "the very essence of Ukrainianness, fed by anti-Russian venom and lies about its identity, is one big sham".

On 26 April 2022, Putin's national security adviser Nikolai Patrushev said that "the Americans by using their proteges in Kyiv decided to create an antipode of our country, cynically choosing Ukraine for this, trying to divide an essentially single nation" and that "the result of the policy of the West and the Kyiv regime under its control can only be the disintegration of Ukraine into several states".

Russian opposition politician Leonid Gozman, former co-chairman of Right Cause, called Sergeytsev a "scumbag". Andrei Kolesnikov, a political analyst at Carnegie Moscow Center, said that consultants like Sergeytsev can be used to create strategies for authorities but they "don’t have any serious influence on anything".

=== International reactions ===
President of Ukraine Volodymyr Zelenskyy said that the article is proof of the Russian Federation's plans to carry out a genocide of Ukrainian citizens. He noted that in order to denote the genocide of Ukrainians in the article the terms "de-Ukrainisation" and "de-Europeanization" were used. In his opinion, this is a part of the evidence for a future tribunal against Russian war crimes in Ukraine.

According to a representative of Ukraine at Russian-Ukrainian peace negotiations Mykhailo Podoliak, the article is an official call for mass murders of Ukrainians because of their ethnicity, and will be considered as such by international criminal courts. The Minister of Culture and Information Policy of Ukraine Oleksandr Tkachenko commented:

Cynically, the author speaks about Ukrainian Nazism. When we see exactly the opposite: Russia is mass murdering Ukrainians because of their national identity. What should I call it? I will answer straight away: it is genocide of the Ukrainian people by Russia.

The head of the Latvian Ministry of Foreign Affairs Edgars Rinkēvičs called the article "ordinary fascism". Former Canadian ambassador to Ukraine Roman Waschuk said that "It's essentially a rhetorical 'licence to kill' Ukrainians."

==== Legal ====
In Germany in April 2022, Bundestag deputy Thomas Heilmann filed a lawsuit with the Berlin prosecutor against the author of the article. According to Heilmann, the article may be a violation of the Convention on the Prevention and Punishment of Genocide.

In Ukraine in May, the Ukrainian Prosecutor General's Office opened a pre-trial investigation in the case.

==== Scholars and media ====
According to Mika Aaltola, director of the Finnish Institute of International Affairs, the article showed Russian war propaganda "developing in a worrying direction". Latvia-based Russian media Meduza wrote that the article is "essentially a blueprint for the genocide" of Ukrainians. Oxford expert on Russian affairs Samuel Ramani stated that the article "represents mainstream Kremlin thinking". The American historian Timothy Snyder wrote that the text "advocates the elimination of the Ukrainian people as such". He later noted that it uses a special definition of the word "Nazi": "a Nazi is a Ukrainian who refuses to admit being a Russian". In his opinion, the article reveals the genocidal intent of Russia.

Slavoj Žižek wrote: "So, Russia plans to do with Ukraine what Bertolt Brecht describes in his 1953 poem "The Solution": dissolve the people and elect another. By reading Sergeytsev's mad ravings alongside Putin's claim that Lenin invented Ukraine, we can discern the current Russian position. Ukraine has two fathers: Lenin, who invented it, and Hitler, who inspired today's “ukronazis” to actualize Lenin's invention".

== See also ==
=== Related topics ===
- 2014 pro-Russian unrest in Ukraine
- Annexation of Crimea by the Russian Federation
- Anti-war protests in Russia (2022–present)
- Krasovsky case
- Russian imperialism
- Russian nationalism
- War crimes in the Russian invasion of Ukraine
  - Allegations of genocide of Ukrainians in the Russo-Ukrainian War
  - Bucha massacre
  - Child abductions in the Russo-Ukrainian War
- "Where have you been for eight years?", a phrase used during the 2022 Russian invasion of Ukraine

=== Related publications ===
- "Address concerning the events in Ukraine", 2022 speech by Vladimir Putin
- The Foundations of Geopolitics: The Geopolitical Future of Russia, 1997 book by Aleksandr Dugin
- "On conducting a special military operation", 2022 speech by Putin
- "On the Historical Unity of Russians and Ukrainians", 2021 essay by Putin
