= Zakhar Tropin =

Ukrainian lawyer and academic

- Захар Володимирович Тропін
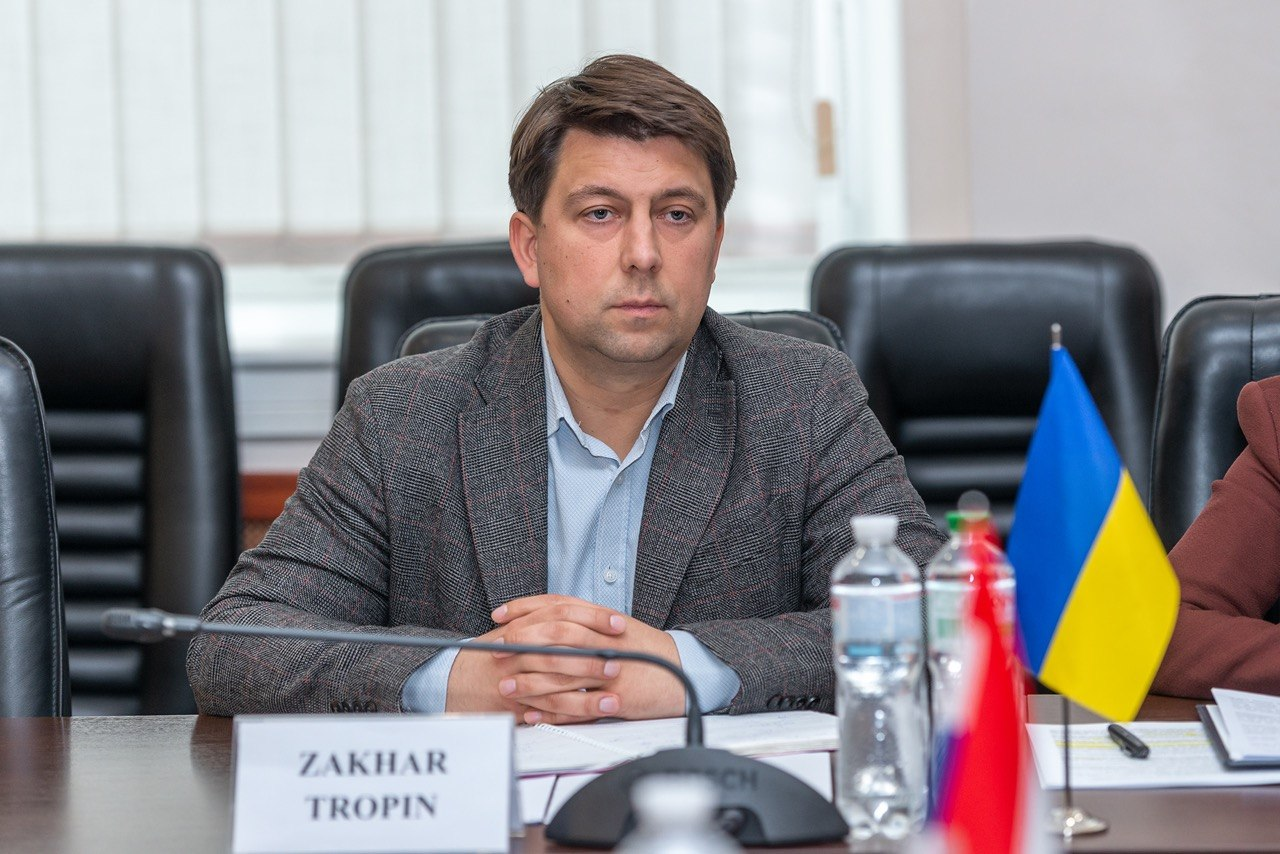
- Born: 27 June 1980 (age 46); Kyiv, Ukrainian SSR, Soviet Union
- Education: Taras Shevchenko National University of Kyiv
- Occupations: Lawyer, academic, lecturer
- Known for: Scholarship on peaceful settlement of international disputes, state responsibility, jurisdictional immunities

Zakhar Volodymyrovych Tropin (Ukrainian: Захар Володимирович Тропін; born 27 June 1980, Kyiv) is a Ukrainian international lawyer and a representative of the Kyiv school of international law. He is a Candidate of Juridical Sciences (2008), docent (2013), and Associate Professor at the Department of International Law of the Institute of International Relations, Taras Shevchenko National University of Kyiv. He is the author of works on international law, jurisdictional immunities of states, peaceful settlement of international disputes, the work of international judicial and arbitral institutions, international criminal law, international humanitarian law, and the international responsibility of states.

== Biography ==
Tropin was born on 27 June 1980 in Kyiv into a family of educators. Both parents worked as lecturers at higher education institutions; his father also worked in public administration.

After graduating from the Sumy Classical Gymnasium with advanced study of English, he enrolled at the Institute of International Relations of Taras Shevchenko National University of Kyiv, completing a bachelor's degree in international relations (international law) in 2004 and a master's degree in international law with honours in 2006.

In 2008 he defended his candidate's dissertation on the topic "Mechanism for the settlement of international disputes under the Energy Charter Treaty".

After completing postgraduate studies, he began his career in international law. He worked at the Ministry of Justice of Ukraine, where he dealt with matters of Ukraine's international cooperation and representation of state interests before international courts and arbitral tribunals.

In parallel, he has been teaching at the Department of International Law of the Institute of International Relations, holding the position of associate professor since 2012; in 2013 he was awarded the academic title of docent of the Department of International Law.

He has participated in expert and competitive activities, including as a candidate in competitive selections for judicial and legal institutions in Ukraine. Since August 2025 he has held various positions in the legal department of Naftogaz of Ukraine.

== Professional activity ==
Since 2006, Tropin has combined teaching, expert work, and legal practice in the field of international law. As Associate Professor at the Department of International Law of the Institute of International Relations, he teaches courses on Public International Law, Peaceful Settlement of International Disputes, International Economic Law, and a Practicum on Settlement of International Disputes.

In legal practice, he cooperated with the law firm "Proxen & Partners", where over the years he held positions of lawyer and partner. He obtained his certificate as a practising attorney in 2010.

In the public sector, he held the position of Director of the Department of International Cooperation and Representation (later renamed the Department of International Law and Representation) of the Ministry of Justice of Ukraine. He represented Ukraine at events related to international law, state responsibility, and international criminal law. In particular, he was involved in Ukraine's ratification of the Rome Statute of the ICC, the establishment of the Special Tribunal for the Crime of Aggression against Ukraine,

and the International Compensation Mechanism.

As an expert he has participated in seminars and trainings on international humanitarian law organised by human rights organisations, including the ZMINA Human Rights Centre, the OSCE, and the Ukrainian Red Cross Society.

He is a member of the Ukrainian Association of International Law and of the Ukrainian National Bar Association, where he served on the Committee on International Law.

== Academic work ==
Tropin's main areas of academic interest are public international law, peaceful settlement of international disputes, state responsibility, the work of international judicial and arbitral institutions, international economic law (including international trade and investment law), jurisdictional immunities, and international criminal justice.

He is the author of more than 80 scholarly works, including articles in Pravo Ukrainy (Law of Ukraine), Pravova Derzhava (Rule-of-Law State), the Ukrainian Journal of International Law, Security and Defence Quarterly, and others.

He is the sole author of the monograph Means of Settlement of International Disputes under the Energy Charter Treaty: State and Problems of Implementation (2012) and a co-author of the textbook Public International Law (2018). He is also a co-author of the collective monographs Legal Framework for the Security of the Azov–Black Sea Region (2022) and Per aspera ad astra (2025).

== Public and expert activity ==
Tropin regularly appears as an expert on international law in Ukrainian and foreign media. His analytical articles have been published in The Kyiv Independent, New Eastern Europe, Atlantic Council UkraineAlert, ZMINA, Yur-Gazeta, VCTR.Media, Ukrinform, and Radio Liberty.

His publications cover the international responsibility of the Russian Federation, the establishment of a special tribunal for the crime of aggression and an international compensation mechanism, the application of international humanitarian law, issues of international criminal law, and the jurisdiction of international courts and arbitral tribunals.

== Selected publications ==
1. Tropin, Z. V. Means of Settlement of International Disputes under the Energy Charter Treaty: State and Problems of Implementation. Kyiv: Feniks, 2012.
2. Tropin, Z. "Lawfare as part of hybrid wars: experience of Ukraine". Security and Defence Quarterly, 2021.
3. Tropin, Z. V. "Institutional Mechanisms for Reviewing the Participation/Limiting the Participation/Excluding the Russian Federation from the United Nations". Pravo Ukrainy, No. 1, 2024.
4. Korynevych, A.; Korotkyi, T.; Tropin, Z. "Ukraine v. Russia (Genocide Convention): prima facie jurisdiction of the ICJ". Ukrainian Journal of International Law, No. 1, 2022.
5. Tropin, Z. V.; Korotkyi, T. R. "Jurisdictional Immunity and Immunity of State Property". Pravova Derzhava, 2023.
6. Tropin, Z. "Special Tribunal for the Crime of Aggression against Ukraine: long way of choosing appropriate modality". In Per aspera ad astra. Kharkiv, 2025.
7. Bohutskyi, P.; Korotkyi, T.; Tropin, Z. Legal Framework for the Security of the Azov–Black Sea Region in the Context of International Conflicts. Kharkiv, 2022.
8. Tropin, Z. "The Kakhovka Dam Explosion as Russia's Scorched Earth Tactic". New Eastern Europe, 2023.
9. Tropin, Z. "Why Washington's approach to punishing Russia won't work". The Kyiv Independent, 2023.
10. Tropin, Z. "ECHR ruling confirms Russian invasion of Ukraine began in 2014". Atlantic Council UkraineAlert, 2023.
