= Otto Luchterhandt =

German legal scientist and professor

- Born: 1 August 1943 (age 83); Cello
- Education: University of Freiburg, University of Bonn, University of Cologne
- Occupations: Professor, Legal Scientist
- Years active: 1975–present

Otto Luchterhandt (born 1 August 1943 in Celle) is a German Legal scientist. From 1991 until his retirement in 2008 he taught as Professor of Public Law and Eastern European Law at the University of Hamburg.

== Biography ==
Otto Luchterhandt was born in Celle of Lower Saxony on 1 August 1943.

=== Education ===
He studied law, political science, Slavic studies and Eastern European history at the public universities of Freiburg and Bonn from 1965 to 1970. He passed his first German state examination in 1970 and his second state examination in 1975. In 1974 he received his doctorate from the University of Cologne with a thesis on the relationship between the Soviet state and the Russian Orthodox Church. From 1975 to 1990 he worked as a research assistant and employee at the Institute for Eastern Law at the University of Cologne. He qualified as a professor in 1986 with a thesis on basic duties as a problem of the German constitution. From 1988 to 1990 Luchterhandt held professorships at the universities in Freiburg, Cologne and Hamburg.

From 1991 until his retirement in 2008, Luchterhandt was Professor of Public Law and Eastern Law at the University of Hamburg and Director of the Department of Eastern Law Research. From 2003 to 2012 he was the President of the Göttingen Working Group.

=== Political activity ===
In September 2019, he was one of around 100 constitutional law professors who addressed the German Bundestag with an open appeal for voting rights: Reduce the size of the Bundestag!.

Luchterhandt considered the actions of both Georgia and Russia in the 2008 Russo-Georgian War to be disproportionate and contrary to the international law. One of his doctoral students is Rati Bregadze, Minister of Justice in Georgia. In the spring of 2024, Luchterhandt called on Bregadze to abandon a widely criticized legislative proposal.

In a written statement, Luchterhandt described the actions of the Russian armed forces in the Mariupol during the invasion of Ukraine in 2022 as a "deliberate genocide".

== Works ==
=== Monographies ===
- Grundpflichten als Verfassungsproblem in Deutschland. Geschichtliche Entwicklung und Grundpflichten unter dem Grundgesetz, Berlin 1988.
- Der verstaatlichte Mensch. Die Grundpflichten des Bürgers in der DDR, Cologne 1985, ISBN 3-452-19791-3.
- UN-Menschenrechtskonventionen, Sowjetrecht, Sowjetwirklichkeit, Baden-Baden 1980, ISBN 3-7890-0587-8.
- Der Sowjetstaat und die Russisch-Orthodoxe Kirche, Köln 1976, ISBN 3-8046-8510-2.

=== Contributions ===
- Verwaltung und Verwaltungsrecht im Erneuerungsprozeß Osteuropas, Berlin 2001, ISBN 3-8305-0243-5.
- Neue Regierungssysteme in Osteuropa und der GUS. Probleme der Ausbildung stabiler Machtinstitutionen, 2. aktualisierte Auflage, Berlin 2002, ISBN 3-8305-0040-8.
