= Genocidal intent =

Concept in international law

Genocidal intent is the specific mental element, or mens rea, required to classify an act as genocide under international law, particularly the 1948 Genocide Convention. To establish genocide, perpetrators must be shown to have had the dolus specialis, or specific intent, to destroy a particular national, ethnic, racial, or religious group, in whole or in part. Unlike broader war crimes or crimes against humanity, genocidal intent necessitates a deliberate aim to eliminate the targeted group rather than merely displace or harm its members.

The concept of genocidal intent is complex and has spurred significant legal debate, primarily due to the challenge of proving an individual’s intent to destroy a group without direct evidence. International criminal tribunals, such as those for Rwanda and the former Yugoslavia, have relied on circumstantial evidence to infer intent, considering factors such as the general context, the scale of atrocities committed, systematic targeting of victims because of group membership, and repetition of destructive or discriminatory acts. Legal standards for genocidal intent have varied, with some rulings demanding dolus directus (direct intent to cause harm) and others allowing for dolus indirectus (foreseeable consequences accepted by the perpetrator). This discrepancy has influenced judicial outcomes, as seen in the acquittal of certain defendants under stringent intent requirements, leading some scholars to advocate for a knowledge-based standard to better facilitate genocide convictions.

The debate surrounding genocidal intent also intersects with state accountability. The rigorous evidentiary standards for genocidal intent remain a point of contention, as critics argue they hinder genocide prevention by setting a high threshold for intervention and prosecution. A more fundamental criticism is that requiring genocidal intent for killings to be criminal privileges the intention of states over the loss suffered by civilian victims, which could hinder efforts to prevent civilian killing where genocidal intent is not present.

== Definition and legal standards ==
For an act to be classified as genocide (under the Genocide Convention), it is essential to demonstrate that the perpetrators had a deliberate and specific aim (dolus specialis) to physically destroy the group based on its real or perceived nationality, ethnicity, race, or religion. Intention to destroy the group's culture or intending to scatter the group does not suffice.

In 2019, Canada's National Inquiry into Missing and Murdered Indigenous Women argued that when it comes to state responsibility for genocide, "a state's specific intent to destroy a protected group can only be proved by the existence of a genocidal policy or manifest pattern of conduct." The MMIWG inquiry used a broader definition of genocide from the Crimes Against Humanity and War Crimes Act which encompasses "an act or omission committed with intent to destroy, in whole or in part, an identifiable group of persons." The inquiry described the traditional legal definition of genocide as "narrow" and based on the Holocaust.

== Judicial interpretations ==
=== International Criminal Tribunals ===
The International Criminal Tribunal for the former Yugoslavia (ICTY), International Criminal Tribunal for Rwanda (ICTR), and International Court of Justice have ruled that, in the absence of a confession, genocidal intent can be proven with circumstantial evidence, especially "the scale of atrocities committed, their general nature, in a region or a country, or furthermore, the fact of deliberately and systematically targeting victims on account of their membership of a particular group, while excluding the members of other groups."

=== Standards of intent ===
It is non-controversial that proving dolus directus would meet the Genocide Convention's intent requirement; the weaker standard of dolus indirectus (indirect intent, meaning that the perpetrator did not desire the harm but foresaw it as a certain result of their actions and committed the act with this knowledge) is less clear.

Some scholars argue that a knowledge standard would make it easier to obtain convictions. Some of the existing international tribunal cases like Akayesu and Jelisić have rejected the knowledge standard.

The acquittal of Jelisić under the more onerous standard was controversial, and one scholar opined that Nazis would have been allowed to go free under the ICTY's ruling. When Radislav Krstić became the first Serb convicted by the ICTY under the purpose standard, the Krstić court explained that its decision did not rule out a knowledge standard under customary international law.

=== Recent developments ===
In 2010, the Khmer Rouge Tribunal referred to the precedent of the ICTR in discussing the role of genocidal intent.

== Debate ==
In the 2004 United Nations Commission of Inquiry into the War in Darfur, Claus Kress argued that the ICTY and ICTR were incorrect in their view of the genocidal intent of individuals. Hans Vest argued for the interlinked roles of an individual's intent and the individual's expectation of contributing to a collective action. Kjell Anderson discussed ways of separating out the roles of collective policies and their interaction with individual intent. Olaf Jenssen disagreed with the lack of sentencing Goran Jelisić for genocidal intent, arguing that legal consistency would imply that the perpetrators of the Holocaust would not have been convicted for genocide.

== Cases ==
- Akayesu: The court rejected the knowledge standard.
- Jelisić: Acquittal under the more onerous standard, controversial for its implications.
- Krstić: First Serb convicted by the ICTY under the purpose standard; did not rule out a knowledge standard under customary international law.

== Sources ==
- A Legal Analysis of Genocide: Supplementary Report of the National Inquiry into Missing and Murdered Indigenous Women and Girls (PDF) (Report). National Inquiry into Missing and Murdered Indigenous Women and Girls. 29 May 2019. Archived from the original (PDF) on 30 March 2024.
- Bachman, Jeffrey S. (2022). The Politics of Genocide: From the Genocide Convention to the Responsibility to Protect. Rutgers University Press. ISBN 978-1-9788-2147-7.
- Blackhawk, Ned; Kiernan, Ben; Madley, Benjamin; Taylor, Rebe, eds. (2023). The Cambridge World History of Genocide. Vol. II: Genocide in the Indigenous, Early Modern and Imperial Worlds, from c.1535 to World War One. Cambridge University Press. doi:10.1017/9781108765480. ISBN 978-1-108-76548-0.
  - Kiernan, Ben; Madley, Benjamin; Taylor, Rebe. "Introduction to Volume II". In Blackhawk et al. (2023), pp. 1–20.
- Ochab, Ewelina U.; Alton, David (2022). State Responses to Crimes of Genocide: What Went Wrong and How to Change It. Springer International Publishing. ISBN 978-3-030-99162-3.
