= HIV/AIDS in Russia =

- Disease: HIV
- Confirmed cases: 1,528,300
- Deaths: 405,477

HIV/AIDS in Russia is described by some researchers as an epidemic. The first cases of human immunodeficiency virus infection were recorded in the USSR between 1985 and 1987. The first known patient, or patient zero, was officially considered to be a military interpreter who worked in Tanzania in the early 1980s and was infected though sexual contact with a local man. After the 1988–1989 Elista HIV outbreak, the disease became known to the general public and the first AIDS centers were established. In 1995–1996, the virus spread among injection drug users (IDUs) and quickly expanded throughout the country. By 2006, HIV had spread beyond the vulnerable IDU group, endangering their heterosexual partners and potentially threatening the broader population.

It is estimated that, in 2017, the Russian Federation had the highest number of HIV-positive people of any country in Europe. In the following five years, the Federal Service for Surveillance on Consumer Rights Protection and Human Wellbeing estimated that the number of new infections ranged from 70,000 to 100,000 annually. By the end of 2021, there were 1.137 million HIV-positive people in the country, accounting for 1.5% of the adult population; 424.9 thousand people died during the entire history of the epidemic. Nevertheless, most experts believe that the real number of HIV-positive people is significantly higher, as many carriers of HIV remain undiagnosed. According to Vadim Pokrovsky, 1.25 million Russians are infected with HIV as of 2025.

== First cases of infection ==
=== First cases ===
According to the Moscow Scientific and Practical Centre for Addiction Medicine, the first cases of human immunodeficiency virus (HIV) infection in the Soviet Union may have occurred as early as the 1970s through unprotected sexual contact with African students. Diagnosis was impossible at the time, as the first HIV screening was not conducted until 1987. Officially, the first foreign victim of AIDS in the USSR died in 1985. A thirty-year-old student of the Higher School of Trade Union Movement had contracted HIV while on a holiday visit to family in South Africa. He was later admitted to Moscow Infectious Diseases Hospital № 2 with pneumonia and died a month later.

In the next two years, 219 infected foreigners were identified. In 1986, the first specialized unit providing medical care for people living with HIV was opened at an infectious diseases hospital in Moscow. Initially, its patients were solely foreigners; after a course of treatment, they were subject to deportation. By 1989, there were 485 HIV cases among foreigners in the country. Half of them were in Moscow, with the rest spread out across Odesa, Kyiv, Minsk, Leningrad (now Saint Petersburg), and other cities in the USSR. In Soviet state media outlets, incidents of HIV infection were explained as attempts to discredit the USSR's relations with friendly African countries. The newspaper Izvestia claimed in 1987 that AIDS had been 'invented by the Pentagon in a laboratory of biological warfare methods'. HIV was presented as a disease solely affecting capitalist society. State media claimed that HIV could not be spread to the USSR, since homosexuality, drug use and prostitution were allegedly not practiced in the country. Although carriers were subject to deportation, the virus began to spread gradually among Soviet citizens.

There are several versions of the spread of the disease within the country. The officially registered patient zero was Vladimir Krasichkov, an engineer and military translator from Zaporizhzhia, who was on assignment in Tanzania in 1981. During his service, he had sexual contact with a local HIV carrier and had sexual intercourse with 25 Soviet conscripts when he returned to Moscow. Five of the conscipts were later diagnosed with the disease. Krasichkov himself repeatedly sought medical attention and he was diagnosed with HIV with AIDS on 26 February 1987, as a result of an enzyme immunoassay. According to some media reports, the Ministry of Health tried to conceal the circumstances of his illness, allegedly taking a non-disclosure pledge from him in exchange for benign treatment. Krasichkov died in the summer of 1991. Evidence of further spread of the virus varies. It is known that one of Krasichkov's five HIV-positive partners transmitted the virus to his wife and their child was born with HIV. He also donated blood to five other patients, including three children.

The first death from acquired immune deficiency syndrome in the country was registered in September 1988. The victim was Olga Gaevskaya, a 30-year-old evening student at the Leningrad branch of the Moscow Institute of Technology. She had contracted HIV between 1979 and 1985, when she had had repeated sexual contacts with foreigners, particularly Africans. She received treatment in the following years, during which she tested negative for HIV in 1988. No HIV antibodies were found due to poor diagnostic methods, such as doctors mixing the blood of three to ten patients into one sample because said HIV testing kits were scarce at the time. A separate sample was taken from each patient only in case of a positive result. Gaevskaya was diagnosed with AIDS post-mortem, as antibodies to HIV were found in her blood. There is also evidence that the first death from AIDS in the USSR was recorded by Professor Andrey Kozlov in Odesa in 1988. His patient was a child who had been infected by his mother. After the incident, more children were tested for AIDS.

Number of HIV-positive people among Soviet citizens, 1985-1989
Territories	1987	1988	1989	Total 1985—1989
USSR citizens	34	85	322	441
RSFSR citizens	22	50	268	340
Residents of other Soviet republics	12	35	54	101

== Kalmyk outbreak ==
The first major outbreak happened in Elista, the capital of the Kalmyk Autonomous Soviet Socialist Republic. The patient zero was a former enlisted sailor who was infected in the Congo by a local prostitute. He later transmitted the virus to his wife, and their child became infected during her pregnancy. Shortly after giving birth, the infant was hospitalized at the district pediatric hospital, where he died before the diagnosis was made. In 1988, the first patient from Elista was identified. She was a female donor who had been infected by her infant while breastfeeding. In December of that year, the Vremya newscast reported an outbreak of HIV infection in a children's clinic in Elista, where an infected infant was treated. A total of 75 children and 4 adult women were infected. A medical board headed by Vadim Pokrovsky was called to investigate in early 1989. The doctors found that the child was infected in the hospital due to negligence of the medical personnel, who used the same syringes several times, changing only the needles:

This was before hospitals began to actively use disposable syringes. This meant that all syringes had to be sterilized, and, in fact, not all of them were sterilized. We did a simple comparison between the number of injections given and the number of syringes sent for disinfection and found that the difference was about 30-40%

— Vadim Pokrovsky

Such practices were common throughout the country. Presumably, local outbreaks of HIV infection could have occurred before, but were not recorded. For example, in Kalmykia, the 'Republican Center for the Prevention and Control of AIDS and Infectious Diseases' was established only a year before the Pokrovsky investigation. Doctors, journalists, and representatives of the RSFSR Ministry of Health also offered unofficial theories of infection: local sheep disease, some blamed recently discovered immunoglobulin. However, later research on the genome of the virus confirmed that it had spread from a single individual and corresponded to subtype G, which has only been recorded in the Congo.

Several patients were transferred from the Elista hospital to large medical centers in Volgograd, Stavropol, Rostov-on-Don, and Shakhty, so the virus began to spread in these regions. By 1989, there were a total of 270 infected people The news about the spread of the HIV virus caused a societal backlash. Pickets were held outside the Elista hospital, local residents began harassing the victims and their families, and they demanded that the infected be placed in isolation wards. USSR citizens began to refuse blood donation and medical procedures on a mass scale, and in some hospitals, doctors allowed patients to bring their own syringes. Under the orders of Yevgeniy Chazov, chief of the Ministry of Health, AIDS centers were established across the country.

Children infected in hospitals in southern Russia, by 1996
Region	Number of infected children	Total number of deaths	Number of AIDS deaths
Rostov Oblast	98	41	40
Kalmykia	74	43	37
Volgograd Oblast	52	29	25
Stavropol Krai	15	7	6
Chechnya	6	4	3
Dagestan	5	4	4
Astrakhan Oblast	2	1	1
Other regions	13	5	4

== Virus spreading ==
=== 1990-2019 ===
The WHO classifies HIV epidemics in three stages. In the first stage, less than 1% of the general population and less than 5% in vulnerable groups are infected. When more than 5% are infected in one vulnerable group, the disease moves to the concentration stage. In the third, generalized stage, HIV infection extends beyond one group, the epidemic spreads to the general population, and the proportion of HIV-infected pregnant women reaches 1%. While in the 1980s there were sporadic outbreaks of infection in the USSR, the 1990s saw a new phase in the spread of HIV, where the disease was most often transmitted through blood by injecting drugs.

According to the WHO, by the 1990s, there were 494 infected people in Russia (307 adults and 187 children). Nevertheless, the actual figures may differ. Before 1990, patients had to provide passport data for HIV testing. Those found to be HIV-positive were required to make a list of their sexual contacts, and the principle of medical confidentiality did not apply to them. For this reason, young people preferred not to be tested for HIV or did it using false documents. Between 1987 and 1995, only 1,096 carriers were identified among the 160 million surveyed people. At the same time, diagnostic laboratories did not provide complete testing: only preliminary tests were performed at blood transfusion stations and AIDS diagnostic laboratories. The results were confirmed at the only AIDS diagnostic laboratory at the Central Research Institute of Epidemiology of the USSR Ministry of Health. The Ministry of Health of the RSFSR admitted tardiness in the deployment of preventive measures. Hospitals did not comply with the anti-epidemic regimen and did not conduct explanatory work among the population satisfactorily. Research institutes of the Ministry of Health of the RSFSR paid little attention to virus research. The work of scientists was not coordinated, there was no republican program of scientific research, no clear system of surveillance and preventive measures.

Researchers call 1996 the beginning of a new phase in the spread of HIV in Russia. It was preceded by an outbreak in the Ukrainian port city of Odesa, where the HIV strain was introduced from Central Africa in 1993. While in 1994 only 3 cases were diagnosed in the city, by 1995 the number had risen to 1021. The virus spread rapidly among injecting drug users (IDUs) in the former Soviet Union. After just one year, their share in the total number of Russian infected was 30.7%. During the first 10 months of 1996, the official number of persons infected with AIDS in Russia increased by 4.5 times; within one year, the total number of those infected almost doubled (from 1,090 to 1,925 carriers). The rapid growth in the number of infected people was attributed to high unemployment, the development of a shadow economy and a low level of living, which led to an increase in the number of drug addicts. HIV prevention measures were mainly aimed at the sexual channel of the virus spread. Special commissions at state AIDS centers distributed medications and determined which infected people to treat. The largest epicenters during this period were major agglomerations, as well as single-industry towns that experienced an economic crisis after the collapse of the Soviet Union.

Since 1999, the virus began to spread more and more frequently among people who engage in unprotected sex (both homosexual and heterosexual). Experts attribute this to the fact that HIV has reached saturation point in IDU communities, as well as to a decrease in the overall number of drug users. In 2003, for example, 17% fewer new IDUs were registered than in 2002. Large segments of the population were at risk, as injecting drug users (estimated by WHO at 1-2% of the population by 2005) were putting their sexual partners at risk. During the first decade of the 21st century, the proportion of this mode of HIV transmission became comparable to that of injecting drug use. Between 2000 and 2005, the share of newly reported cases of infection through non-sterile injecting needles fell from more than 90 percent to 66 percent. Experts noted the critical situation: by 2001, cases of HIV had already been registered in all regions of the country. Nevertheless, in the following years the rate of spread of the virus generally began to decrease, since parenteral drug use with an unsterile needle has a much higher chance of infection than unprotected sexual intercourse. While in 2001 the primary incidence rate was 55 cases per 100,000 people, five years later it was 20-23 cases per 100,000. Part of the reason for this decrease in the number of HIV diagnoses is that fewer tests were conducted in some high risk groups, such as injecting drug users and prisoners. From 2000-2004, there were 51% fewer tests among IDUs and 30% fewer tests among prisoners. This distorted the overall picture of the HIV epidemic in Russia. Starting in the middle of the first decade of the 21st century, the number of infected people resumed growing. By the end of 2006, 0.5% of the Russian population between the ages of 15 and 49 were officially registered as HIV-positive. Between 2006 and 2017, the incidence rate tripled, reaching 60 cases per 100,000 inhabitants.

The exact number of carriers in the country is difficult to determine, since health services have not kept up with the spread of the virus, and vulnerable groups are often reluctant to be tested. In addition, HIV infection can be asymptomatic for 8–10 years. For the most accurate calculation of the infected population, several estimation systems have been developed that give different results. If according to official data, the number of HIV-positive citizens in 2003 was only 235,000, then epidemiologist Vadim Pokrovsky testified about more than 700,000 infected people. The media called his estimates deliberately exaggerated, and the proposed 'soft methods' of HIV prevention – 'softening the brains of the population and preparing the ground for further colonization of the Third World'. Antiviral prophylaxis was given a moral dimension: journalists emphasized marital fidelity and family values. State bodies did not support Methadone maintenance and Harm reduction programs, including syringe distribution to HIV-infected people. Since 2006, the Federal Drug Control Service of Russia have lobbied for a system of HIV prevention based on repressive methods requiring carriers to give up drugs entirely. A misguided belief spread among officials that high moral standards of citizens would help stop the AIDS epidemic, and the federal media silenced the problem. Chief Narcologist of the Ministry of Health Eugene Brun commented that “The medical community is generally skeptical about handing out syringes on the street, because by handing out materials, we draw attention to this area to those citizens who have never even thought about it. It's a kind of 'drug propaganda.' Those non-profit charitable foundations that criticized the country's current HIV legislation, educated the population, and distributed condoms and disposable syringes to at-risk groups were often labeled as foreign agents. Their activities contradicted the state policy in the sphere of drug addiction and AIDS prevention and fell under the principles of post-liberal ideology. For example, in 2016, during the trial over the status of the Saratov-based NGO 'Socium', which received foreign funding, a guest expert described it as 'a participant in a hybrid war waged against Russia.

When in 2008 the number of carriers reached 444,000, Federal Service for Surveillance on Consumer Rights Protection and Human Wellbeing acknowledged the state significance of the problem. A year later, according to estimates by various international and Russian experts, the real number of Russians living with HIV ranged from 800,000 to 1.5 million (1-2% of the country's adult population). In 2010, the Federal AIDS Research Center reported over 516,000 HIV-positive citizens. By that time, since the beginning of the epidemic, more than 60,000 HIV-positive people had died for various reasons. There was an increase in the number of infected pregnant women (from 0.3% in 2003 to 0.62% in 2011), which indicates a concentrated epidemic stage according to the WHO classification. Eight regions of Russia recorded over 1% of HIV-positive pregnant women as early as 2008. In contrast, the proportion of infected adolescents decreased from 24.7% to 1.5% between 2000 and 2012. Presumably, the reasons were prevention programs in the country's educational institutions and an increase in the age at which risky behavior begins to be practiced.

In 2005, of the more than 1.4 million people infected with HIV in Europe and Central Asia, about 61% were Russian citizens. One year later, 90 percent of all HIV-positive people in Eastern Europe and Central Asia lived in Russia and Ukraine. The most affected regions of the Russian Federation were Samara, Irkutsk, Leningrad, Orenburg, Sverdlovsk, Tyumen, Ulyanovsk, Chelyabinsk, Kemerovo and Kaliningrad oblasts, the city of St. Petersburg, and the Khanty-Mansiisk Autonomous District. A large cluster of drug users had formed there, and by the end of 2009 between 0.5% and 1.2% of the population in these regions were officially registered as carriers. HIV predominantly affected the young population of the country: 70.5% were diagnosed before the age of 30. Experts feared that this would soon lead to an increase in the dependency ratio, as well as affect the rate of long-term economic growth. According to various estimates, by 2025-2035 the population loss due to AIDS will reach 20-30 million people. During the next decade, the annual increase in HIV-positive people in Russia was 5-10%. The number of deaths from HIV was increasing by about 20% annually. According to Rospotrebnadzor, by early 2013, 140,000 HIV-infected people had died for various reasons. A year later, the number of carriers in the country exceeded 900 thousand people, 80% of whom were under 30 years old. At the same time, the deputy prime minister of the Russian government Olga Golodets stated that the total number of carriers exceeded one million, with more than 6,000 new infections daily. About 40% of all carriers were female. One in twenty men aged 30–35 years old was a carrier of HIV.

In 2015, the Federal AIDS Center officially registered 1 million HIV-positive people. Of these, approximately 53% of infections were related to drug use, 43% to sexual contact between men and women, and 1.5% to homosexual contact. Despite the relatively high number of surveys (10-19.3% in 2006-2015, epidemiologists assumed that the real number of carriers was 7 times greater. Half of the new HIV cases were attributed to 22 regions. The most critical situation with the spread of HIV was observed in regions where drug trafficking took place. Thus, Rospotrebnadzor considered Irkutsk (1.7% of the population infected with HIV) and Samara (1.6%) Sverdlovsk (1.6%), Kemerovo (1.5%), Orenburg (1.2%), Leningrad (1.2%), Chelyabinsk (1%) problem regions. Tyumen (1%) regions, St. Petersburg (1%). In November 2016, the press service of the Yekaterinburg Health Department reported that every 50th resident of the city is infected with HIV. In 15 regions, more than one percent of pregnant women were infected. In many cases, they found out about their status when they were registered at the maternity clinic.

By 2017, according to WHO data, Russia became the leader in the number of HIV-infected people in Europe (1.16 million people). This year alone, 104 thousand new cases of HIV were registered, of which 53% were detected at the last stage, for 55% the routes of infection were not identified. Approximately 2.8% of the country's most economically active population, men aged 30–39, were HIV-positive. Women under 30 years of age were more frequently infected, as they had more sexual contact with older men. Russian Health Minister Veronika Skvortsova reported different figures: 998,500 identified HIV carriers, 81% of whom did not know their status. An American-Swedish research group in the journal PLOS Medicine pointed out that there are actually more than 2 million infected people in Russia.

By the end of 2021, there were 1.137 million people living with HIV in the country, and 70.5% of them were registered for medical care. According to academic Vadim Pokrovsky, this figure is about 70% of the real number of people living with HIV. The number of regions with high HIV rates (more than 0.5% of the population) increased from 22 to 36. More than half of the country's total population (60.1%) and 82.8% of those infected with HIV resided in these regions. The most acute situation was observed in 22 regions (more than 1% of the population).

Most-affected regions in Russia
Federal subject	Per 100,000	Total cases
Kemerovo Oblast	2,211	58,218
Irkutsk Oblast	2,068	49,118
Sverdlovsk Oblast	1,907	81,807
Samara Oblast	1,818	57,343
Orenburg Oblast	1,588	30,862
Chelyabinsk Oblast	1,410	48,547
Khanty-Mansi A.O.	1,344	22,687
Novosibirsk Oblast	1,337	37,256
Leningrad Oblast	1,329	25,163
Tyumen Oblast	1,266	19,546
Perm Krai	1,263	32,570
Republic of Crimea	1,191	22,650
Krasnoyarsk Krai	1,155	32,972
Kurgan Oblast	1,145	9,373
Altai Krai	1,136	26,089
Ulyanovsk Oblast	1,108	13,501
Tomsk Oblast	1,097	11,745
Saint Petersburg	1,082	58,282

Since the beginning of the 21st century, the portrait of the average HIV-infected person has changed markedly. While in 2001, 87% of carriers were diagnosed at the age of 15-29, in 2019, 84% were first diagnosed at the age of over 30. According to statistics from the AIDS Center, 71% of those infected were economically active adults 30 to 50 years old. One of the reasons cited by epidemiologists was the high cost of condoms and lack of risk awareness. A new trend in the spread of the virus was its spread from Russia and Ukraine to Central Asian countries due to work migration.

=== Current state ===
According to UN estimates, in 2021, Russia ranked among the top five countries in terms of HIV prevalence, accounting for 3.9% of all newly diagnosed cases in the world. In the previous two years, the number of infections diagnosed in the Russian Federation decreased slightly (from 94,000 to 71,000), which was attributed to lower volumes of testing during and immediately after the COVID-19 pandemic. The growth of the HIV epidemic in the country over 30 years has led to the situation that at the beginning of 2022, with 1.137 million Russians were infected out of 144 million total population. Nevertheless, most experts believe that the real number of HIV-positive people is significantly higher, as a noticeable share has not yet been identified. This is reinforced by the ultra-conservative state policy promoted by the Russian Orthodox Church and the authorities since President Putin's return to his third term in 2012. Activists confirm that the 2013-2020 toughening of homosexual propaganda laws actually bans certain health and social services - HIV prevention in the LGBT community is now often equated with 'propaganda.' As a result, by 2021, government discrimination and police harassment of vulnerable populations hampered HIV prevention efforts. UNAIDS acknowledged that the 'gay propaganda law' would undermine the Russian authorities' goal of eradicating AIDS by 2030 and called for its abolition.

In addition to the stigmatization towards people living with HIV, human rights activists and volunteers are concerned about the lack of funding. Despite the increase in the budget for the purchase of HIV drugs, in 2021 only slightly more than 30% of registered patients received them. This is due to the fact that the allocated budget did not cover the price increase: if in 2020 over 505 thousand annual courses were bought, in 2021 just over 391 thousand could be bought. Regional investments did not improve the situation – 72.2% of the 3.7 billion rubles of additional funding went to Moscow, the Moscow Region and St. Petersburg. As a result, therapy coverage declined by 11-15% annually. HIV-positive Russians reported that treatment was in fact only available in large cities, and that Russian AIDS centers recommended conjugal sex as prevention (which is not consistent with WHO recommendations). Foreign funding for WHO prevention measures threatens volunteer organizations with foreign agent status. For instance, the Andrey Rylkov Foundation was a supplier of free clean needles and condoms to drug addicts in Moscow, which in was accused by Russian deputy Vasily Piskaryov in 2020 of promoting drugs in response to the foundation's assistance to drug addicts during the coronavirus lockdown.

The position of HIV-infected people worsened after the Russia invasion of Ukraine and the resulting imposition of international sanctions. In 2021–2022, the Russian Ministry of Health reduced the share of unparalleled expensive foreign drugs for HIV treatment from 67.3% to 55% of the total volume of ARV procurement. In November, the Patient Control organization reported a shortage of Eviplera produced by Johnson & Johnson. Eviplera is one of the most expensive and popular combination drugs. Shortages were reported in 12 regions, of which the shortage was particularly acute in the Tver region, Komi Republic, and Crimea. Of the total number infected, a study by the British charity NAM estimated that in 2022 only 45% were receiving antiretroviral therapy. In February 2023, the media reported that in some corrective labor colony, prisoners began to be denied life-saving therapy. By December 2023, the HIV infection levels had reached 'epidemic proportions' in 19 regions with hot spots in the Kemerovo, Tver, Samara and Tomsk Oblasts, where more than 1.8% of all pregnant woman have been diagnosed with HIV. In Moscow, Crimea, Leningrad Oblast and Chechnya, less than 50% of patients were able to access therapy.

In 2022, the head of Rospotrebnadzor's Research Department for Epidemiology and AIDS Prevention estimated the total number of HIV-infected people to be 1.5 million (of whom 1.1 million were laboratory-confirmed cases). This figure diverges from the estimates of the Ministry of Health (about 850,000), which believes that the situation with HIV in the country has 'stabilized'.

Although officially most Russians with HIV/AIDS are exempt from military service, reports of illegal conscriptions have surfaced since the partial mobilization was announced. At the same time, the Ukrainian authorities confirmed that the Wagner Group was recruiting prisoners with infectious diseases, as some of the Russian prisoners were infected with Hepatitis C and HIV. Nevertheless, there have been multiple offers on the Internet to buy fake HIV certificates that allegedly allow one to avoid being drafted.

== Statistics ==
=== Incidence ===
New HIV cases in Russia per 100,000 (2018) >130 100-129 70-99 50-69 20-49 <20

As the virus spread, the incidence rate grew geometrically. In 1987, it was 4.2 cases per 100,000 people; by the beginning of the 21st century, it was 157 cases. The main hotbeds of the spread were poorer regions, where injection drugs were more common. For example, in 1998 in Irkutsk Oblast alone, 32 people were diagnosed with HIV, and a year later this figure increased almost 100-fold – up to 3157. According to the UNAIDS, the total number of people infected in 2002 was four times higher than the official figures. Between 2007 and 2018, Russia was the world's third fastest-growing country in terms of HIV incidence, after South Africa and Nigeria. In 2013–2015, the average number of those infected increased by about 10% each year. In 2016–2017, the statistical handbook of the Ministry of Health found the average growth of HIV-infected people at 86 thousand nationwide. The incidence of HIV infection was 58.4 per 100 thousand people; the overall increase was about 1%, although significant jumps were observed in some regions. In Moscow, the number of new infections rose from 2,400 to 2,900, an increase of 20%. In the Chukotka Autonomous District, the increase was 151% (from 29 to 73 cases per 50,000 population), in Tyva – 133% (from 9 to 21 people per 310,000 population). But according to the ministry itself, it is incorrect to judge the percentage ratio based on these data, since a small number of carriers originally lived in these regions. By 2018, statistics showed that 10 people were infected with HIV every hour in Russia. In addition, in 2016–2018, the number of small towns with the number of infected people exceeding the national average by 2–4 times (Severouralsk, Kirovgrad, Togliatti, Verkhny Ufaley, Novotroitsk and others) has increased.

Officially, the fact of epidemic is stated when more than 1% of the population is a carrier of the virus (for Russia - about 1.4 million). In November 2022, Rospotrebnadzor estimated the total number of infected people at 1.5 million, by 2030 their number could reach 2 mln. The Ministry of Health, whose methodology is different, called these figures an estimate. According to the Ministry, the total number of HIV-positive people in the country was almost two times less - 850,000.

The Ministry of Health also denied the UNAIDS ranking in which Russia was among the five world leaders in the rate of HIV infection – according to its data, for 2019-2021 the incidence fell by 31.4% (from 58.6 to 40.2 per 100 thousand people). Rospotrebnadzor estimates, on the contrary, correspond to the data of the United Nations Joint Programme on HIV/AIDS - 48.7 per 100 thousand people or, roughly, 71 thousand new cases in 2021. In the WHO European Region, Russia led in the number of newly diagnosed HIV infections — it accounted for 55% of all cases, of which almost a third were diagnosed at a late stage. The most affected regions were the following 22 subjects of the Russian Federation

Russian activists describe the situation as critical. In 2015, co-founder of AIDS.Center Anton Krasovsky described the situation in the country as the largest epidemic in the world. In 2019, Vadim Pokrovsky classified the situation in the most affected regions as a generalized epidemic stage, when the virus spreads beyond vulnerable groups. International experts also ascribe the status of the epidemic to the situation in Russia.

=== Mortality ===
In the early stages of the epidemic, key vulnerable groups were reluctant to be tested for HIV and refused therapy. As a result, health services could not track the spread of the virus promptly, and carriers found out about their diagnosis in the last stages of the disease. Between 2000 and 2007, the increase in the standardized HIV mortality rate was 54% for men and 69% for women. By the end of the period the rate reached 4.3 cases per 100 thousand inhabitants. In 2007 alone the number of deaths exceeded 3.5 thousand people.

The HIV incidence rate increased from 187.3 to 472 cases per 100,000 people between 2007 and 2017. The increase in the number of carriers indicated delayed diagnosis, low treatment coverage, and late initiation of therapy. As a result, the mortality rate from HIV increased 5.5 times during the same period, most of those infected died in the working age (from 20 to 59 years old). In ten years, the share of HIV-positive people in the total number of deaths from infectious and parasitic diseases increased from 11% to 57%. The mortality rate varied greatly across the country, forming clusters of high mortality (more than 21 cases per 100 thousand population): Middle Volga and Ural (Samara, Ulyanovsk, Orenburg, Sverdlovsk, Chelyabinsk, and Tyumen regions); southern Western Siberia (Kemerovo and Novosibirsk regions, Altai Krai); Baikal region (Irkutsk region, Buryatia). The head of the Federal Center for AIDS Prevention and Control Vadim Pokrovsky believes that if such trends persist, by 2031 the mortality rate from HIV infection will exceed the mortality rate from tumors.

During the first two decades of the 21st century, there was a rapid increase in mortality from HIV infection in both men and women. The highest rates were registered in the regions of the Siberian and Ural Federal Districts. The COVID-19 pandemic had a negative impact on mortality statistics among HIV-positive people. They were more severely affected by the new virus, and, presumably, as a result, the number of deaths among them in the first 10 months of 2021 increased by 5.4% compared to 2020. Over the entire period of observation, 424,900 people, or 27.2% of all detected cases, had died of HIV in Russia by the beginning of 2022. Meanwhile, 15% of this number died in the last two years-about 32,000 in 2020 and 34,000 in 2021.

Increase in the cumulative number of registered cases of HIV infection among Russian citizens in 1987-2021

=== Calculation methods and their limitations ===
Government bodies and researchers cite conflicting statistics about the incidence of HIV due to different methods of counting.

- The Ministry of Health counts the number of people who applied for medical care and presented a passport and SNILS. The press service of the Russian Ministry of Health calls its own data 'the only official and most accurate source of information about the situation with HIV infection in the country,' since all other counting systems are of an estimative nature.
- Rospotrebnadzor counts the percentage of HIV-positive results in the total number of blood tests performed. As of 2018, Russia was the only country in the world that practiced polyclinic registration of patients with HIV. A number of experts criticized the current system. According to Academician Vadim Pokrovsky, this practice leads to a difference between the recorded and real numbers.
- The predictive estimation system takes into account data from medical examinations of pregnant women, population health surveys (at the household level) and populations at high risk of HIV infection, data from the registration of detected cases, as well as data from all other types of monitoring. On this basis, scientists determine the estimated number of HIV-positive people and the margin of error of the calculations.

== Vulnerable groups and spread routes ==
Under natural conditions, the immunodeficiency virus is transmitted from person to person horizontally (through sexual intercourse, blood transfusions, use of non-sterile injecting equipment) and vertically (from mother to child during pregnancy, childbirth, or breastfeeding). There have been cases of HIV infection through organ transplants and artificial insemination using contaminated donor materials. As a result, the entire population of the country is potentially at risk of infection. But the main transmission channels are defined by the most vulnerable groups: commercial sex workers (CSWs), injecting drug users (IDUs) and men who have sex with men (MSM). Over time, their ratio in the total number of HIV-positive people has changed.

Horizontal channel of spread

In the early stage of the epidemic in 1996–1999, the virus was most commonly transmitted through injection drug use (78.6% of all known cases). Since the beginning of the new century, their share among newly diagnosed cases has gradually declined: from 95.6% in 2000 to 61.3% in 2007. But this mode of infection remained dominant. By 2009 in 46 regions of Russia the infection rate among IDUs exceeded 5%, in 13 regions it reached 20% (Chechen Republic and Republic of Buryatia, Kaliningrad, Leningrad, Tver, Ryazan, Orlovo, Chelyabinsk, Sverdlovsk, Irkutsk, Ulyanovsk and Chita, and Saint Petersburg. By 2012, IDUs were the most affected group of HIV-vulnerable people, ranging from 6.4% to 58.5% of carriers in different regions. The nature of the HIV epidemic among this population group was distinctly territorial. Critical HIV situations were typically observed in regions where homemade drugs were produced. At the same time, the number of HIV-positive CSWs ranged from 3.8% to 11.6% in different regions, and from 5.2% to 14.8% among MSM.

In the 2000s, transmission through sexual contact began to increase. Already since 2004, in 43 regions of the country there have been more HIV-positive people infected sexually than those who received the virus through injecting drug use. A year later, the sexual route of infection prevailed in half of Russia's regions, and the proportions of men and women who were infected became comparable. While in 1987-2001 the proportion of HIV-positive women was 22%, in 2004-2006 they accounted for 42–44% of new cases. In subsequent years, it was the sexual route of infection that remained the most common among HIV-positive women. At the end of 2009, it accounted for 61.8% of new cases. For men, the parenteral route of infection remained the leading one. During the same period, it accounted for 76.1% of first-time male carriers and 78.0% of all persons with known causes of infection. This indicated the dominance of men in the gender composition of carriers. The trend continued in the following years: in 2017, men prevailed both in the overall structure of carriers — 61.5%, and among first-time HIV-positive patients — 56.3%.

In the second decade of the 21st century, the proportion of registered HIV-positive drug users began to decline. While in 2015 there were 203.6 IDUs with HIV per 100,000 people, a year later there were only 151.3. From 2012 to 2018, the number of people infected through infectious drug use decreased from 56% to 33%. In 2019, more than half of newly diagnosed carriers were infected through heterosexual contact (62.7%), only 33.6% through drug use, and 2.5% — through homosexual contact. Epidemiologists distinguish people who regularly have sex (sex workers, young people, migrant workers and those prone to promiscuity) as an independent vulnerable group. But the widespread public opinion that only people with a large number of sexual partners are at risk of infection is wrong. By 2014, 1.5% of men and women in the sexually active age group (25–35 years) were carriers of HIV, indicating a high chance of infection even with a single partner. Young people (15–29 years old), who for various reasons are often unable to protect themselves from the virus, are particularly at risk. For example, population surveys in 2009 showed that a large proportion of young people engaged in risky sexual behavior, even though most of those surveyed were aware of the real risk of infection. Increasing rates of sexually transmitted infections required the implementation of personal hygiene education programs and the education of young people.

Sex workers are subject to mandatory testing when detained by police. At the same time, Russia has criminalized spreading HIV. As a result, members of this vulnerable group are reluctant to get tested themselves and take HAART. According to surveys, in 2005, 64% of sex workers aged 20–24 tested positive for HIV. After four years, the percentage of CSWs in the total number of HIV-infected people ranged from 4.5% in Moscow to 20% in Irkutsk. Commercial sex workers, like IDUs, are prone to marginalized behavior and crime. As a result, convicts and detainees are also a vulnerable group. A survey conducted in Russian penitentiary institutions in the early 2000s showed that only 10% to 15% of inmates had no sexual contact (voluntary or forcible) during their incarceration. According to the Red Cross, at the beginning of the 21st century, the concentration of HIV-positive people in the general prison population was 26 times higher than in the general population. The number of cases of HIV infection registered in the Russian penitentiary system rose from 7,500 in 1999 to 32,000 in 2005. By the end of 2009, there were 55,964 HIV-positive in Federal Penitentiary Service facilities (about 11% of the total number of carriers in the country). Prisoners' HIV status constitutes no grounds for parole. At the same time, conditions of detention and treatment may not meet the necessary standards. For example, in 2018, a riot broke out in one of the colonies in the Murmansk region, in particular, because of the lack of proper medical treatment. The European Court of Human Rights has repeatedly received lawsuits from relatives of prisoners who died of HIV as a result of lack of treatment. Poor condition of Russian penitentiary institutions in 2020 threatened an epidemic of COVID-19, deaths from which could be disguised as deaths from secondary HIV diseases.

The first identified HIV-positive individuals in the country were men who have sex with men. But the scale of HIV prevalence among Russian MSM is poorly researched. In 1995–1996, the percentage of new infections through homosexual contacts fell drastically from 55% to 7%. But, according to some epidemiologists, MSM put themselves at greater risk, as they relatively often change sexual partners and places of residence, which can lead to an increase in the number of carriers. While in 2000 0.2% of HIV-positive MSM were officially registered, in 2004 they were already 0.5%, and almost 2% in 2016. For the entire period of observation in 2009, 2,289 MSM with HIV were identified. Nonetheless, Academician Vadim Pokrovsky noted a high degree of awareness among MSM, who often use additional protective measures.

=== Vertical transmission channel ===
Vertical transmission of HIV (from mother to child) was common in the early stage of the epidemic. Thanks to the development of antiretroviral therapy, it has been possible to reduce the number of such infections. Without preventive measures, the risk of vertical transmission during childbirth is 25% to 50% (this rate depends on viral load and the health of the mother). If patients receive therapy, the risk is drastically reduced. Between 1987 and 2015, only 6% of children born to HIV-positive mothers were found to have antibodies to the virus. By 2015, the rate had dropped to 2.2%, one of the best levels in the world. This result was achieved by developing a system to prevent perinatal HIV transmission. By 2018, 93% of HIV-infected women in labor were under observation. Of these, about 2/3 already knew they were infected before they became pregnant. Children with HIV infection were 99% covered by outpatient care, and antiretroviral therapy coverage was 91%. Data from 2019 indicated that with timely therapy, the risk could be reduced to 1.2%. Only 165 children out of 13747 born to HIV-positive mothers were infected with the virus in the first year of life. Another 63 children became infected with HIV during breastfeeding. Over the entire surveillance period, 205,675 live children were born to HIV-positive mothers in Russia by the end of 2019, antibodies to the virus were detected for 11,322.

Medical prevention of vertical HIV transmission consists of testing pregnant women and prescribing antiretroviral drugs to the mother and the baby. If a woman has no indication for ongoing ART, she is prescribed treatment from 26–28 weeks of pregnancy, at delivery, and to her baby after birth. Sanitary regulations permit delivery if the mother has a viral load of more than 1,000 copies of HIV RNA per milliliter of plasma. If the viral load is unknown, a cesarean section is practiced (after the 38th week of pregnancy). Mothers are motivated to avoid breastfeeding. Chemical prophylaxis for children of HIV-positive mothers is started from the first hours of life, but no later than three days after birth or from the last feeding of breast milk with mother's milk (subject to its further withdrawal).

In Russia, double HIV testing of all pregnant women applying to antenatal clinics is enshrined by law; HIV testing of spouses and sexual partners of pregnant women has been introduced in regions highly affected by HIV. Despite the mandatory nature of testing, as of 2011 in some regions testing was conducted on a fee basis.

HIV Infection Rate in Russia by Known Factors of Infection, 1987–2018

== HIV prevalence by federal districts ==
HIV prevalence statistics vary from region to region of the country, as they depend on a number of geographic, social and economic factors. The most affected areas are characterized by pronounced social inequality. HIV infection aggravates the economic and social status, affecting the demographics situation, as well as the age and sex structure of the population. In 2006, about 60% of all registered cases of HIV infection belonged to 10 regions: Sverdlovsk Oblast, Moscow Oblast, Samara Oblast, Irkutsk Oblast, Chelyabinsk Oblast, Orenburg Oblast, Leningrad Oblast, Saint Petersburg, Moscow, Khanty-Mansi Autonomous District. In subsequent years, there was an increase in the number of regions where more than 0.5% of the population was infected. In 2014 there were 22 such territories, while in 2018 there were 35. The most affected areas included: Ivanovo Oblast, Irkutsk, Kemerovo region, Kurgan Oblast, Leningrad region, Moscow, Murmansk Oblast, Novosibirsk Oblast, Omsk Oblast, Orenburg, Samara, Sverdlovsk, Tver region, Tomsk region, Tyumen region, Ulyanovsk region and Chelyabinsk region, St. Petersburg, Khanty-Mansi Autonomous Okrug, Republic of Crimea, Perm Oblast, Krasnoyarsk region, and Altai. The highest rates of HIV incidence were noted in Siberian Federal District and Ural Federal District, the lowest — in North Caucasian Federal District.

Dynamics of HIV incidence in federal regions, 2000-2020

=== Central Federal District ===
The epidemiological situation in different regions of the Central Federal District (CFD) varies greatly. Thus, in 2009-2012 the average growth rate of HIV-infected people in the CFD was 32.5%. The maximum rates were observed in Lipetsk (56.1%), Smolensk (53.2%) and Voronezh (50.75%) regions, the minimum — in Tula (23.4%). At the same time, the district was in the top three in terms of the rate of primary disability due to HIV-related diseases. The growth of AIDS patients in the CFD was 86.6%, the increase in the number of deaths of people with HIV was 83.7%. By 2020, the total number of HIV-infected people reached 206.9 thousand, with the region traditionally among the leaders in terms of testing coverage (over 21-29% in 2013-2020).

Moscow was the leader in terms of the number of tests and detected cases in the federal district for 2019-2020 — about 10 thousand HIV-positive people were detected per almost 4 million examined sera. In comparison, in the second leading region — the Moscow region — only 1.7 million tests were conducted with positive results in 3.7 thousand people. The situation in the two subjects was still better than in most regions — for example, in the Kemerovo Region 3.6 thousand cases of HIV were detected per 600 thousand people tested. The relatively good statistics in the central regions are influenced by good regional funding and a higher standard of living. For example, in 2019 the Moscow region ranked second in the country in terms of the number of people receiving antiretroviral therapy. On the other hand, according to Vadim Pokrovsky, head of the Scientific Center for AIDS Prevention and Control at the Central Research Institute of Epidemiology of the Russian Federal Consumer Rights Protection and Human Health Control Service, Moscow's statistics on the incidence of HIV infection is affected by the specifics of data collection, which considers only people with a Moscow residence permit. Taking into account non-Moscow residents, the actual incidence of the virus could be much higher.

=== Northwestern Federal District ===
The Northwestern Federal District as an administrative-territorial unit was formed by presidential decree in May 2000. The first cases of HIV infection on its territory were detected as early as 1987, when the epidemic began. At the beginning of the 21st century there was large-scale drug traffic passing through the Leningrad Region, which contributed to the rapid spread of the virus. In 2005 the incidence was 310.3 cases per 100 thousand examinees, in four years - 367.8. The most affected areas were St. Petersburg, where the index almost reached 1% of the total population, Leningrad Region - 0.7%, Kaliningrad Region - 0.5%, Murmansk Region - 0.45%. By 2015, the NWFD was in fifth place by the total number of carriers after Privolga, Siberian, Ural and Central federal districts. The average detection rate was 303.8 cases per every 100 thousand examinations. The lowest incidence rate was recorded in the regions of the Far North: in Nenets Autonomous District and Arkhangelsk Oblast. The leaders in terms of incidence were St. Petersburg, Leningrad, Kaliningrad and Murmansk regions. At the same time, the highest annual increase in the number of new HIV cases was registered in Komi Republic (80.7%), which is due to the proximity of the Urals Federal District.

By 2015, there were more than 109,000 HIV-positive people registered in the Northwestern Federal District, which accounted for 12% of the total number of carriers in the country. The incidence was 43.5 cases per every 100,000 inhabitants. In the next five years, the rate dropped to 33.7, but the total number of carriers continued to grow. In 2020, there were more than 115,000 people with HIV in the district.

=== Southern Federal District ===
Southern Federal District (SFD) is considered to be a territory with a stable HIV situation. Nonetheless, in 2010, despite a relatively high level of examinations among risk groups, insufficient detection rate was recorded in the district as a whole. In this period, the rate was 133.4 cases per 100,000 inhabitants. However, the high percentage of HIV-positive cases among tuberculosis patients (2172.9 per 100 thousand inhabitants) indirectly pointed to a higher prevalence in the region. This could be explained by the insufficient number of surveys. The Southern Federal District and the North Caucasus Federal District ranked last in terms of the total number of tests per inhabitant (0.156 and 0.094, respectively).

By 2020 the situation remained unchanged: 26.7% of every 100 thousand people in the Southern Federal District were tested against the national average of 27.7%. The total number of HIV-positive people was 83.3 thousand. The most problematic regions were the Russian-occupied Ukrainian Republic of Crimea and Krasnodar Krai, each with over 22,000 HIV-positive people. The most favorable situation in the district was observed in the Republic of Kalmykia, where only 292 carriers were registered.

=== North Caucasian Federal District ===
As of 2018, the North Caucasian Federal District was the region with the most positive figures. During the entire observation period since 1988, about 17 thousand carriers were registered on its territory, more than 5 thousand of them in the most affected Stavropol Krai. The rates were directly affected by the cultural peculiarities of the region. On the one hand, condemnation of premarital sex reduced their number, on the other hand, the taboo nature of the topic reduced the number of tests: in 2020, the percentage of those tested per 100,000 people was the lowest in the country (24.1%).

=== Volga Federal District ===
Since the beginning of the 21st century Volga Federal District is a territory with a high level of HIV infection and morbidity rates exceeding the national average. Population surveys in the first decade testified to poor preventive work in the region. For example, in 2009 only 25.5% of respondents in Tatarstan were aware of the risk of contracting HIV during sexual intercourse. By 2013, more than 65% of the territories of the Volga Federal District were characterized by high HIV prevalence. As of 2020, the Volga Federal District was the leader in the absolute number of registered HIV-positive people (over 244,000). The most affected region was Samara region, where more than 57 thousand carriers of HIV were registered. The Orenburg Oblast, the second highest in the ranking, had almost twice as few (30 thousand). The epidemiological situation in the Volga Federal District was complicated by the prevalence of ARV-resistant strains.

=== Ural Federal District ===
Since the first decade of the 21st century, the Ural Federal District (UrFD) has had a difficult epidemiological situation. While in 1999-2001 in Russia as a whole the incidence of disease increased 2.4-fold (from 20.7 to 50.9 cases per 100,000 inhabitants), in the Urals Federal District it increased 15-fold (from 11.2 to 168.4). The leaders of the district were the Sverdlovsk, Chelyabinsk, and Tyumen regions, where a large number of IDUs lived. Thanks to preventive work among drug users in subsequent years, it was possible to slow down the rate of spread of the virus. In 2005, the incidence rate was 50.4 people per 100 thousand inhabitants; in 2010, the growth resumed and the rate reached 85.7. In 2008-2015, the largest number of tests was conducted in the least affected region - Yamalo-Nenets Autonomous District. The testing rate among IDUs in the Urals Federal District was higher than the national average: 1.38% compared to 0.9% of the total number of screenings. But in general, the district suffered under-detection, which affected the rate of spread of HIV. For example, in Kurgan region the incidence rate increased more than sixfold between 2008 and 2014. Although in 2015-2020 the incidence rate decreased markedly from 135.6 to 78.7 cases per 100 thousand people, but still exceeded the national average by more than one and a half times. By 2020 the total number of people registered with HIV in the Urals Federal District was 185,000, with 43% of them in the most affected Sverdlovsk Region.

=== Siberian Federal District ===
In the initial stage of the HIV epidemic in Russia, the Siberian Federal District (SFD) had a relatively low incidence rate. The first 2 cases were detected in 1989 and were due to Hospital-acquired infections of children. Up until 1996, only sporadic cases were recorded in the county, with the total number of infected reaching 44 people. In 1999 the virus began rapidly spreading among IDUs in Irkutsk Region, where over three thousand new carriers were registered during the year. In 1999, the number of infected people increased 28.8 times. Within four years the virus spread through Republic of Buryatia, Kemerovo region, Altai, and Krasnoyarsk region. The incidence in these regions ranged from 24.2 to 62.6 cases per 100,000 inhabitants. Since the beginning of the 21st century, SFD has been the leader in the number of IDUs, which was reflected in the rate of HIV spread. Already by 2005, the incidence rate in the district exceeded the national rate by 1.9 times. By 2012, the most unfavorable HIV situation was observed in the Irkutsk, Kemerovo, Novosibirsk, Altai, and Krasnoyarsk Krai. Against a backdrop of increasing incidence and a complex mix of carriers with a high percentage of IDUs across the county recombinant strains resistant to ART were spreading. By 2020, the total number of carriers in the SFD reached 237 thousand people, although the incidence dropped to 94.3 cases per 100 thousand population (from 127.5 in 2019). The most affected regions were Kemerovo, Irkutsk, and Novosibirsk regions, the least affected were Republic of Tyva.

Absolute number of first registered HIV cases in the Siberian Federal District, 1989–2012

=== Far Eastern Federal District ===
The HIV epidemic in Eastern Siberia and Far East has been studied less than in other parts of the country. In 2006-2018 in Far Eastern Federal District (FEFD), the average annual increase in the number of HIV-infected people amounted to 8.64%. As of 2010, more than 11 thousand people with HIV were registered in the FEFD, 72.4% of whom lived in Primorsky Krai. Within it, the distribution of carriers was uneven: Terneisky, Olginsky, Chuguevsky, Krasnoarmeisky, Lazovsky, and Anuchinsky districts recorded sporadic morbidity. This was explained by the inaccessibility of the territories, their remoteness from major foci of infection — Ussuriysk (73.94 cases per 100 thousand people), Dalnerechensk (70.11), Artem (55.19), Partizansk (48.37), Nakhodka (48.29).

By 2020, the incidence rate in the Far Eastern Federal District was almost half that of the national average and was approximately 39 cases per every 100,000 inhabitants. The most affected regions were Primorsky Krai, Buryatia, Zabaykalsky Krai, which accounted for about 70% of all HIV-infected people in the region.

== HIV testing practices ==
According to the 1990 regulations, the standard groups for HIV testing were MSM and bisexuals, promiscuous persons, sex workers, recipients of blood products, Armed Forces personnel, citizens who traveled abroad for more than one month, or foreigners who arrived for more than three months. But the federal law on the prevention of the spread of HIV of 1995 made testing mandatory only for donors of any body fluids, tissues and organs; as well as for doctors and researchers whose work involved handling virus particles. In subsequent years, other vulnerable groups were added to the list: people in prison (1996), pregnant women (1997), personnel at Gynecology wards (1999), those entering military higher educational institutions and contract military service (1998), and those receiving Russian citizenship (2003). In addition, in accordance with FSIN regulations, all those entering prisons are tested for HIV.

Voluntary HIV testing is free for anyone. But in most cases the examination is carried out on the recommendation of a doctor, less often — on the initiative of the examinee. The main part of those examined are people aged 15–49 years, the older generation and children — most often with the relevant indications.

In Russia, the standard procedure for diagnosing HIV infection involves ELISA. It allows a large number of tests, but can give false-positive results. To make a definitive diagnosis, positive tests are confirmed using method of immune blotting with HIV antigens modified by Western blot. Since 2007, Polymerase chain reaction has also been used. Combined with data on epidemiological and clinical criteria it allows the diagnosis of HIV infection in persons who are false-positive, false-negative or of uncertain significance in other tests. For children under one year of age born to HIV-infected mothers, the methods used are aimed at detecting HIV-related genetic material (DNA or RNA). They can be taken off the registry only at 18 months of age after several tests, absence of significant hypogammaglobulinemia and clinical manifestations.

Effective therapy requires early testing, so the main WHO programs are aimed at increasing the availability of screening. In the USSR, 9.5 million people were tested for HIV in 1988 alone, 6.5 million a year later. In 1990-2006, 20-24 million people were tested. But as of 2006, representatives of vulnerable groups accounted for only 10% of the total number of people tested. By 2019, the trend remained unchanged: testing coverage in vulnerable groups was only 4.1%. At the same time, they accounted for 21% of new HIV infections. In all, more than 43 million blood samples were tested during the year (27.6 tests for every 100 people in the population). But according to activists, the authorities tried to artificially increase the number of people tested in order to bring the numbers closer to the WHO prescribed norms. For example, a year earlier it was suggested that children of HIV-positive parents be included in the list of mandatory annual examinations.

Scopes and results of HIV testing in Russia, according to the Federal Scientific and Methodological Center for AIDS Prevention and Control, 2001-2020
Year	Tests	HIV seropositive	Number of seropositive per 100,000 tests
2001	23,996,849	89,548	373.2
2002	24,298,575	52,930	217.8
2003	21,900,300	40,021	182.7
2004	21,786,502	37,929	174.1
2005	21,394,983	40,239	188.1
2006	22,024,278	43,915	199.4
2007	24,340,294	49,946	205.2
2008	24,918,166	56,576	227.0
2009	26,368,843	59,503	225.7
2010	25,982,486	59,877	230.5
2011	25,812,467	63,970	247.8
2012	27,286,151	72,782	266.7
2013	28,327,314	81,898	289.1
2014	29,878,681	93,659	313.5
2015	30,750,547	101,556	330.3
2016	32,855,597	104,905	319.3
2017	36,445,059	109,329	300.0
2018	40,485,246	106,172	262.2
2019	43,131,010	99,379	230.3
2020	37,076,569	75,133	202.6

== Antiretroviral therapy in Russia ==
=== Specifics of therapy in Russia ===
Antiretroviral therapy (ART) does not eliminate HIV, but inhibits its reproduction. This allows the carrier to live in an asymptomatic stage, the development of secondary diseases is slowed down. At the same time the therapy serves as a preventive measure and reduces the contagiousness of people with HIV. ART is a continuous combined etiotropic therapy. It is treated and monitored at AIDS centers in all Federal subjects of Russia.

Antiretroviral therapy for HIV and AIDS was first used in 1987 in the USA. It was based on the nucleotide drug Zidovudine. Academician Vadim Pokrovsky reported that the 'patient zero' in the USSR also received this medication. But there was no full-fledged ART system in the country at the time, and not all infected people had their viral load checked. Since the end of 1995, physicians have been using inhibitors, which formed the basis of combined ART. It implies simultaneous use of two nucleoside analogues of reverse transcriptase and one HIV-1 protease. In 1999 academician Alexander Kraevsky invented and registered the first Russian AVRT drug — Fosfazid. It is a substance that is formed by phosphorylation of Azidothymidine in the human organism. Clinical studies showed that 89% of patients tolerated the drug well, which made it possible to increase its dosage in ART systems. In the following decade, other drugs were developed, allowing more than 200 treatment regimens to be composed. International practice is to treat HIV-infected people as soon as antibodies to the virus are detected, when the immune system is not weakened yet. In Russia, medication is prescribed when the level of immune CD4 cells falls to the count of 350. In 2019, Evgeny Vornin, an HIV specialist at the Ministry of Health, reported that officially 90% of HIV carriers with such a score received treatment. But some epidemiologists and activists report that to save money, doctors delayed treatment, persuading patients to refuse it voluntarily. Often no therapy was prescribed until the count reached 200 units, which could lead to the patient's death from AIDS. In some regions, drugs are prescribed only after special training. Such an approach makes it difficult to obtain life-saving medications: not all newly diagnosed HIV carriers are able to pass the training course for their health condition. Also, according to activists, doctors can prescribe the initial regimen of treatment without taking into account the analyses and personal intolerance of patients. Only if the standard courses are not suitable for the patient, healthcare providers conduct special testing.

Treatment interruptions and discontinuation lead to the development of virus resistance. Russia has a complex patient profile, particularly IDUs, who often refuse regular medication. Thus, in 2019 alone, about 36,000 people interrupted their ART course. In addition, the virus is constantly mutating and developing new strains, resistant to all classes of ARV drugs. In 2015-2019, 5.2% of patients who were not previously on therapy were found to be drug resistant to HIV.

Despite side effects and the need to follow a strict treatment plan, ART is the most effective means of keeping HIV-positive people alive. The development of the ART system made it possible to increase the average life expectancy of HIV-positive people in the United States and Europe to 78 years by 2017. In 85% of carriers taking ART, the viral load was undetectable. This result is only possible with regular medication from the early stages of infection. Nevertheless, the results of the studies do not reflect the situation in Russia, although they help eliminate stereotypes and stigmatization of carriers. Vadim Pokrovsky also noted the need for comprehensive measures:

If a person is infected with HIV once, he or she will remain infected for life. [The population of our country is not growing, so the percentage of infected people is increasing. This will continue until new infections are reduced, until there are fewer HIV-infected people who die. The main focus of the Department of Health now is to provide as many HIV-infected people as possible with antiviral drugs. And those who get treatment are less infectious. But the data from HIV/AIDS in Africa show that even though treatment coverage there reaches 90 %, the figure that the Ministry of Health is aiming for here, it still only reduces the number of new cases by 10-30 %. Of course, it is necessary to treat everyone who is HIV-positive, no one disputes that, but we also need to educate people on how not to get infected with HIV.

In 2020, Patients' Control conducted this survey to find out how much money Russian citizens have to spend to receive medical care for HIV infection, including transportation costs, purchase of medications, paid diagnostics, and/or visits to paid specialists. According to the survey results, 12% of HIV-positive Russians buy antiviral therapy at their own expense.

=== State support ===
In 2005, the cost of antiretroviral therapy was more than $7,000 per person per year. Effective and affordable drugs only appeared in Russia a year later, when the government began to sponsor the Global AIDS Fund to join the G7. The international organization participated in the pricing of major manufacturers, which reduced the cost of drugs. After 2007, the situation with the supply of drugs worsened. By 2016, the state negotiated with pharmaceutical companies on its own. In order to reduce the cost, a number of drugs were included in the list of vital drugs. For example, this halved the cost of 'Evipler' from 50 to 25 thousand rubles.

Before 2013, antiretroviral therapy drugs were purchased by the Ministry of Health of the Russian Federation and distributed among the regions. The system did not take into account regional distinctions, different patient populations, and the specifics of the drugs. Later, drugs began to be supplied on the basis of regional tenders, financed from the federal budget. As a result, the cost of a course of treatment differed in the regions, the difference could be as much as 20 times (according to some reports, 76 times). AIDS Centers were unable to procure the necessary amount of drugs, and HIV-positive people were assigned to centers in the regions where they were registered. Thus, in Moscow, doctors illegally denied therapy to people without residence registration. The press service of the Ministry of Health called the reported cases "unverified" and did not comment on the situation. Since January 2014, the requirements for the execution of state orders have been tightened. Regional officials were not introduced to regulations for tender documentation preparation. The timeframe for local auctions was delayed, for example, in Perm they were held only in the summer, when suppliers sold out their stocks. Some regions lacked didanosine, ritonavir, and other drugs.

During this period, the currency crisis and import substitution led to changes in the Russian antiretroviral therapy system. Because of the fall in the national currency, suppliers inflated prices by 20-30%. Doctors switched patients from foreign drugs to Russian less effective analogues. Of the 1,845 contracts, 614 were for generic forms of drugs, and the rest were for branded medications. At the same time, the cost of generics could be much higher than the market price, as officials indicated the cost of original medicines in the initial maximum contract price. As a result, in 2016 the cost of drugs in Russia and India, where companies regulated pricing under the influence of international funds, differed by more than 6 times. There was virtually no competition between suppliers. Thus, in Chechnya the company 'Medtehfarm' won in more than half of the cases due to the lack of competitors, in Ingushetia the same was with 'ArchiMed'. As a solution to the problem, the general director of Rostec Sergey Chemezov suggested officially securing the status of antiretroviral therapy provider to the corporation Natsimbio. Although Nikolai Bespalov, development director of the analytical firm RNC Pharma, emphasized that Natsimbio was unable to supply the required number of the drugs.

The regional director of the UNAIDS Vinay Saldan pointed out that by 2014, therapy coverage in Russia was only about 40%. According to Anton Krasovsky, director of the AIDS.Center, after two years, only about 20% of people with HIV were receiving medication. In January 2017 it was 35%. By comparison, during the same period in Botswana the figure reached 90%, in Angola, South Africa, and Mozambique — 100%. In order to increase coverage and reduce the cost of treatment, the government reintroduced a system of centralized procurement by the Ministry of Health at the expense of the federal budget and subsidies of the subjects. Due to this the average cost of treatment per patient was more than halved — from 169,400 rubles to 84,000 rubles. Treatment coverage of HIV-infected people increased from 39.5% to 50.1% without raising additional funds. The BBC Russian Service reported other figures: almost half of the patients received an annual course of ART at a cost of 11.4-23 thousand rubles, 34% received a course of 63-88.6 thousand rubles, 10% received more than 130 thousand rubles, and for 6.4% the cost of treatment was unknown. Despite a significant reduction in procurement prices, the situation remained problematic in a number of subjects. Of the 24 billion rubles allocated for ARV procurement, most were centralized costs of the Ministry of Health. Regions did not allocate enough money, despite instructions from the authorities. The International Treatment Preparedness Coalition noted that 21 regions did not announce their own tenders. As a result, in 2017 the portal 'Pereboi.ru' registered a record 509 reports of drug shortages in 45 subjects (according to other data, there were 700).

In 2018, Academician Vadim Pokrovsky reported that about half of registered infected people did not receive medication. According to other data, ART coverage was only 25%, with an overall increase in the number of infected. The press secretary of President of the Russian Federation Dmitry Peskov denied problems with the provision of medicines to citizens. Nevertheless, Yulia Vereshchagina, a representative of the 'Patients' Control' movement, testified about the critical situation:

In the regions there is a shortage of a number of ARV drugs, due to which they change treatment regimens without medical indications. There are reports of short-term, monthly dispensations, so patients have to travel every month to pick them up, which is difficult for those who live in remote areas. Some medications are reported to be denied, forcing patients to switch to an incomplete regimen or remain without therapy altogether.

According to the WHO HIV strategy for 2016-2021, to end the epidemic it is necessary to identify at least 90% of all HIV-infected people and provide at least 90% of them with therapy. Despite Russia's commitment to achieve such targets, government programs determined the real number of HIV-positive people to be covered by therapy to be at least 60%. This would almost halve the rate of increase of the disease and prevent up to 40,000 new cases of infection annually. But in practice, in 2019, only 32 regions reached 70% ART coverage. Nationwide, it was 48.5% of the total number of carriers and 68.9% of those on dispensary care. The situation was worsened by the fact that the main work on combating HIV was concentrated in the 10-15 regions with the highest rate of spread of the virus.

In 2019, 19.3 billion rubles were allocated for the purchase of drugs for people with HIV. The cost of an annual course of antiretroviral therapy could reach 200-300 thousand rubles per person. At the same time the use of generics allowed the Ministry of Health to reduce the cost of several treatment options to 12 thousand rubles per year. Within the framework of import substitution programs, 27 antiretroviral drugs were produced in the country. By this time, more than 200 possible combinations of antiretroviral therapy drugs from Russian and foreign manufacturers had been used in Russia. But none of them was universal, which complicated the work of epidemiologists. At the same time, there was a severe shortage of qualified personnel in Russia familiar with the side effects and various combinations of ART with cardiac glycosides, synthetic antidiabetic agents, and other drugs. Vadim Pokrovsky estimated that about five hundred infectious disease specialists needed to be trained for the full operation of AIDS centers. But the federal budget provided funds only for the purchase of drugs.

Despite an increase in funding, the situation with drugs in the regions remained difficult. Errors in calculations in the formation of centralized procurement led to crises across the country. For example, in the summer of 2019, the Ministry of Health set a low price for 'Lamivudine,' and pharmaceutical companies refused to supply it. In particular, HIV-positive inmates in prisons of the Federal Penitentiary Service did not receive the drug. Since March, the Ministry of Health refused to consider their needs in targeted procurement, and the Federal Penitentiary Service had to conduct auctions on its own. But the supplier company 'Natsimbio' did not receive a request for the drug.

In 2020, the government allocated 29 billion rubles for ART procurement. The number of HIV-infected people was constantly increasing, and according to experts, in a year the amount of subsidies for the full-fledged operation of AIDS centers should have been at least 100 billion rubles. In addition, medical institutions did not have enough specialists to work properly. At least 500 infectious disease specialists needed to be trained in 2020.

=== Methadone therapy ===
One of the most effective HIV prevention programs for IDUs is substitution therapy. In many European countries, instead of full treatment for addiction, drug users are offered alternative ways of using drugs under the supervision of medical personnel. HIV-positive IDUs are offered Methadone maintenance to help them more easily give up opiates. Critics of the method insist that the therapy does not fight drug addiction. Thus, the deputy chairman of the State Duma Sergey Zheleznyak believed that methadone therapy cannot be called therapy because it 'does not treat'. Advocates of the method believe that slowing down the spread of the virus is more important than fully curing a potential carrier of drug addiction. Experts named insufficient prevention efforts, the ban on drug therapy for opioid addiction, and the 'law against propaganda of homosexuality' passed in 2013 as the main reasons for the deteriorating situation with HIV in the country. As a result, by 2015, Russia remained the only country in the world where parenteral drug use remained the predominant way of spreading HIV.

=== Developing vaccines in Russia ===
The development of the first Russian HIV vaccines began in 1997 at the Institute of Immunology of Russia, the GosNIICHB, and the Vector scientific center. Scientists developed three candidate vaccines against the virus, which were preclinically tested in Moscow, St. Petersburg, and Novosibirsk. In 2004, the Institute of Immunology began clinical trials of the drug HIVREPOL. It was a conjugate of recombinant Protein, replicating the internal protein and part of the HIV envelope protein, with the immunomodulator polyoxidonium. But in 2005, the development was phased out. A year later, during the G7 summit, the President of the Russian Federation recognized the need to develop the vaccine. In 2008-2010, with the patronage of Vladimir Putin, a trial program was launched again. For example, during this period, the Vector Medical Center was developing the KombiVICHvac vaccine against HIV-1. It combined B- and T-cell immunogens in a single design, which ensured formation of humoral and cellular immune responses. When all three vaccines passed the first phase of clinical trials, government funding stopped again. The teams of scientists broke up. In 2013, a grant from the Ministry of Industry and Trade under the Pharma 2020 program was won by a research team from St. Petersburg, but three years after the clinical trials, the funding was also terminated.

The main problems in vaccine development are the variability of the virus genome, the unique molecular and epidemiological composition of different territories, and the lack of a universal formula that affects several strains. Epidemiologists estimate that an effective drug will be available worldwide by 2028. But foreign drugs will not be effective for Russian HIV-infected people. In order to stop the spread of the virus within the country, it is necessary to develop our own vaccine focused on the country's dominant strain. Despite this, UNAIDS expert Eduard Karamov reported in 2018 that the majority of Russian research programs were terminated. A year later, only the scientists from the St. Petersburg State Research Institute for HIV and the Biomedical Center were still working on the research. They conducted their studies of the DNA-4 vaccine which consisted of four plasmid DNA, encoding proteins. In 2019, the Moscow City Center for AIDS Prevention and Control began testing a therapeutic HIV vaccine, which allegedly would allow a carrier to live for a long time without therapy.

== Molecular epidemiology analysis ==
Molecular epidemiological analysis allows us to monitor the migration and mutation of the virus and predict the development of the epidemic. It is essential for the development of highly active antiretroviral therapy drugs and vaccines, as well as the implementation of competent antiviral prophylaxis. The method is based on the principle of genotyping the virus and allows physicians to classify subtypes of HIV-1 spread in Russia. Expanded molecular-biological monitoring of HIV in Russia is carried out by the Central Research Institute of Epidemiology, the Vector scientific center, the D.I. Ivanovsky Research Institute of Virology.

Molecular genetic characteristics of the HIV virus in Russia have changed as the infection has spread throughout the country and among different risk groups. The epidemiological situation in Russia has been monitored since the first recorded cases in 1987. For almost a decade, only 7 genetic subtypes (A, B, C, D, F, G, H) and 3 recombinant forms (CRF01_AE, CRF02_AG and gagDenvG) have been recorded in the former USSR. They mostly circulated in different vulnerable groups or within different areas of spread. For example, subtype B virus was more often detected in men who have sex with men.

In Russia, the most widespread variant of HIV-1 is HIV-1 subtype A1. In Russian scientific literature it is also called GOI-A or IDU-A (injecting drug users), in foreign literature it is referred to as AFSU (former Soviet Union). One of the first hotbeds of its spread was an outbreak in the port city of Odesa, where in 1993 the strain was brought in from Central Africa countries. While in 1994 only 3 cases of infection were reported in the city, by 1995 the number had increased to 1021. The virus spread rapidly among injecting drug users Ukraine, Russia, and Belarus. At the same time, a small number of foreign carriers of other subtypes were detected in the former Soviet Union, which limited the spread. These two factors determined the homogeneous genetic profile of the virus in the former Soviet Union. By the early 20th century, IDU-A had moved beyond the vulnerable group of drug users and soon spread to their sexual partners and, later, to children with perinatal exposure to HIV. By 2014, about 90% of carriers were infected with it (about 40% were infected through heterosexual sexual contact). In 2015, IDU-A was found in more than 80% of patients in Russia.

The spread of the second largest subtype B (IDU-B) is associated with an independent outbreak of HIV infection among IDUs in Mykolaiv. Since the early 1990s, this subtype has dominated the MSM group. The strain is presented in two main variants: IDU-B and the closely related strain K03455 (HIV-1 reference variant HXB-2). The former is typical for Eastern Europe, the latter for Western Europe.

Only a few outbreaks of viruses of other subtypes have been recorded in Russia during the period of surveillance. For example, a hospital outbreak of HIV infection in the south of the country in 1989 was caused by subtype G. In 1998, during the outbreak in Tashkent its recombinant mutation CRF02_AG was first recorded. In 2006, it was detected during an outbreak in Novosibirsk. Within a decade, it spread to CIS countries, it was also found in Far East and in Moscow region. At the beginning of the 21st century, its recombination with subtype A1 led to the appearance of a new strain CRF63_02A1 in Siberian Federal District. Before 2002, it was detected in only 3.7% of patients; from 2002 to 2009, its proportion increased to 10.63%; by 2015, it reached 34.08%. In the Novosibirsk region, CRF63_02A1 has been the dominant subtype since 2009 (more than 60% of cases). At the same time, the total number of infections in the region has increased sharply, which is probably due to the activity of the new strain and the development of HIV resistance to antiretroviral drugs. For example, in Tomsk before 2013, the epidemic was slow, with doctors recording about 200 new cases per year. When the new strain appeared, the incidence rate increased tenfold. Although experts also attribute the worsening epidemiological situation in the region to the importation of a new cheap intravenous drug from China and an increase in the number of drug addicts. The spread of CRF63_02A1 in Siberia may lead to future expansion of this variant to other regions of the country. While in Tyumen in 2015 the classic situation with the dominance of subtype A for Russia was still preserved, in the more western and eastern regions (Krasnodar and Khabarovsk) the share of CRF63_02A1 noticeably increased. In 2014-2015, in Kemerovo, the CRF63_02A1 subtype again crossed with the subtype A virus, producing a new recombination.

The CRF03_AB strain was first recorded in Russia in 1998 in Kaliningrad (489 infected), repeatedly — in 2006 in Cherepovets and Vologda region (239 infected). Later, it was recorded in other regions, but generally all cases were related to the first outbreak.

In 2008, HIV A1 variant CRF63_02 was first recorded in Novosibirsk, which became dominant among Tomsk patients by 2013. Between 2014 and 2017, its spread shifted to regions of the Asian part of the country, as well as the countries of Central Asia.

In addition to the above mentioned strains, single samples of recombinants of subtype B and Belarusian strain FN995656, isolate AF377954; subtype D; recombinants CRF01_AE, CRF06_cpx and CRF11_cpx were identified in Russia in different years. The emergence of new HIV-1 subtypes and their recombinant forms reflects the development of the epidemic process and population migration. For example, with the overall dominance of HIV-1 subtype A (95.6±0.9%), recombinant variants (AB, AG, CRF06_cpx, CRF01_AE) and subtype C strain were first encountered in Volga Federal District in 2011-2014. This is due to the location of the subject at the intersection of international transport routes connecting Siberia and the Far East, as well as East Asia countries with European part of Russia and states of Europe. CRF01_AE detected in patients from Nizhny Novgorod region and the republic of Chuvashia form a common cluster with strains from Slovenia, Spain, Kazakhstan, Uzbekistan, Irkutsk, and Smolensk.

In Russian port cities, the ratio of HIV-1 variants may differ from the homogeneous situation due to regular migration and large numbers of newcomers. Despite the predominance of the typical form of HIV subtype A1 in Khabarovsk and Murmansk, variants of HIV subtypes B and C as well as the recombinant form CRF02_AG characteristic of Central Asia are common in these regions. The Eastern European variant of subtype B (GOi-B) is reported in Vladivostok, while in Arkhangelsk the subtypes C and D and the recombinant forms of CRF03_AB (1.5%) and CRF02_AG (1.5%) are circulating. Nevertheless, the percentage of non-A subtypes is relatively low, the second most frequent subtype B being detected in only 6% of patients. Since 2000, the strain CRF06_cpx has been relatively frequently registered in St. Petersburg, which is explained by the proximity to Estonia.

== Legal and regulatory framework ==
State policy against HIV was established in the 1980s-1990s. As early as 1987, there was mandatory testing for HIV blood donors and blood products coming into hospitals. Yet not all transfusion stations had the necessary equipment. In August of the same year the decree On measures to prevent infection with the AIDS virus was issued, which had a punitive nature. It stipulated compulsory screening for people in high-risk groups (drug addicts, sex workers, pregnant women, blood donors, and people traveling abroad), deportation of foreign carriers, and criminal prosecution for spreading the virus. At the same time, the government took several measures to prevent new carriers from entering the country. Thus, all those entering for more than three months presented a medical certificate of absence of the virus. Certificates from countries with a low level of health care were not recognized. In 1996, this practice was enshrined in Federal Law of the Russian Federation No. 122. Activists stressed the discriminatory nature of this attitude and advocated for its abolition.

In 1989, the USSR Ministry of Health approved decrees 'On the Creation of Centers for Preventing and Fighting AIDS' and 'On the Organization of AIDS Prevention Services in the USSR. A year later, the law On the Prevention of AIDS was signed. It contained general regulations on the rights of people living with HIV - to free medications, coverage of the cost of travel to AIDS centers for HIV-positive people and their guardians. The law also included general anti-discrimination provisions prohibiting employers from denying employment to a person because of his or her HIV status, and educational and preschool institutions from admitting HIV-positive children and students. However, these norms have often not been implemented in practice.

Federal Law No. 38 of March 30, 1995 'On Measures to Prevent the Spread of the Disease Caused by the Human Immunodeficiency Virus (HIV Infection) in the Russian Federation - is the main document defining state policy. The following instruments were designed to implement it in different years:

- 1987 — State program to prevent the spread of AIDS for 1987-1995;
- 1993 — Federal targeted program to prevent the spread of AIDS in Russia for (until 1995);
- 1996 — Federal Target Program 'Anti-HIV/AIDS (Through 2001);
- 2001 — Federal targeted program 'Prevention and Control of Social Diseases (2002–2006)
- 2007 — Federal Target Program 'Prevention and Control of Social Diseases (until 2011)'.

Preventive measures to control the spread of the virus are regulated by the federal law 'On the Sanitary and Epidemiological Welfare of the Population' (1999) and the government decree 'On Approval of the Regulations on the State Sanitary and Epidemiological Service' (2000). In accordance with an order issued by the Ministry of Health of the Russian Federation on August 16, 1994, ambulatory observation of HIV patients is performed by AIDS centers and specially trained physicians (infectious disease doctors or therapists). In dealing with HIV patients, the principle of 'trusted doctor' is used, when a patient consults one specialist.

In 2001, the Russian Federation committed itself to the Declaration of Commitment on HIV/AIDS, accepted by the United Nations. With the support of the G8 and UNAIDS, the government prepared a national project 'Prevention of HIV-infection, Hepatitis B and C, identification and treatment of HIV-infected people'. Its implementation is carried out by the Government Commission on Prevention, Diagnosis and Treatment of HIV; the interfactional working group of the State Duma on HIV/AIDS prevention and control; the Coordination Council on HIV/AIDS of the Ministry of Health and Social Development of the Russian Federation; the Country Coordinating Committee on Combating HIV/AIDS and Tuberculosis; the Coordinating Council of the Member States of the Commonwealth of Independent States. Non-profit NGOs, such as the 'Open Health Institute' and 'Russian Health Care' foundations, the non-governmental organization 'Association of People Living with HIV', and regional activists are also active contributors to the project.

In order to be part of the G7, in 2006 the Russian authorities were compelled to recognize the problem of HIV at the federal level. The government was obliged to participate in international programs and sponsor the activities of the Global Fund to Fight AIDS. The government adopted the 'Concept of Preventive Education in the Field of HIV/AIDS Prevention in the Educational Environment'. It included developing educational programs, integrating them into school curricula, training teachers and parents, creating peer-to-peer programs, and involving civic organizations and the media. By 2009, the percentage of schools that provided life skills-based HIV education reached 92.4%.

However, the Russian government subsequently abandoned the activities envisioned by the aforementioned concept. Activities aimed at teaching HIV prevention measures in educational institutions were practically reduced to zero. This was largely due to the adoption of the Federal Law 'On Protecting Children from Information Harmful to their Health and Development' No. 436-FZ of December 29, 2010.

Presidential Decree No. 761 of 01.06.2012 'On the National Action Strategy for Children for 2012-2017' provided for 'Increasing the effectiveness of measures aimed at the prevention of HIV infection and viral hepatitis B and C, tuberculosis, and improving the system to counter the spread of these diseases among target groups of schoolchildren, youth and the most vulnerable population groups. Intensification of the activities of health centers for children in the area of examining children, teaching them hygienic skills and motivating them to give up harmful habits. Implementation of hygiene education programs to enable children to make informed choices about healthy lifestyles'.

By the Order of the Government of the Russian Federation dated October 20, 2016. The 'State Strategy to Combat the Spread of HIV Infection in the Russian Federation until 2020 and beyond' was approved by Order No. 2203-p of the Government of the Russian Federation on October 20, 2016. However, this strategy did not provide for any target indicators of coverage of educational institutions with measures to inform students about HIV prevention measures. At the same time, there is information about informational activities on HIV prevention among students that are currently being carried out in some educational institutions.

In 2007, funding for HIV prevention was provided under the Federal Targeted Program 'Prevention and Control of Socially Significant Diseases for 2007-2011'. By that time, the amount of state funding exceeded 21 billion rubles. A year later, the Russian government signed an agreement with all-Russian associations of trade unions and employers. The document emphasized the need to prevent socially significant diseases (including HIV) in the workplace. Presidential Decree № 537 of May 12, 2009 approved the 'National Security Strategy of the Russian Federation until 2020,' which identified HIV as one of the main threats to the health of the nation.

In 2015, only 37.3% of HIV-infected people were under medical supervision. Weak motivation of vulnerable groups and low levels of funding were the main reasons for inadequate coverage of antiretroviral therapy. Although World Health Organization in the Global Health Sector Strategy on HIV for 2016-2021 set the minimum coverage required to stop the spread of the epidemic at 90% with 90% detection rate. To achieve this goal, in October 2016, the Russian government prepared a state response strategy to HIV threat. Its creation involved 21 federal bodies, 85 subjects, non-profit organizations, the Federation of Independent Trade Unions of Russia union and the Russian Union of Industrialists and Entrepreneurs association of employers, the Coordinating Council of the Ministry of Health on HIV/AIDS.

Despite WHO standards, the state strategy aimed to increase antiretroviral therapy coverage to only 60%. The media noted the formal nature of the document due to the lack of specifics.

Disclosure of other people's HIV status is classified as disclosure of private life, which falls under Article 137 of the Russian Criminal Code. Article 122 of the Criminal Code provides for up to eight years in prison for infecting another person with HIV. For example, in 2016, three people were infected due to the negligence of doctors at a city hospital in Yekaterinburg, and they were paid 15 million rubles.

Up until 2019, the Family Code prohibited HIV-positive people from adopting children. Later, an amendment to the law allowed people with HIV and Hepatitis C to adopt children who were already living with them because of family circumstances.

== HIV response guidelines ==
=== State support ===
Epidemiological supervision

Since 1987, a system of epidemiological surveillance of HIV has been functioning in Russia, which includes: systematic collection of personalized data, mass voluntary and compulsory testing, epidemiological investigation of each case of HIV. As part of the regulations adopted in 1989, the Republican Scientific and Methodological Center for AIDS Control was established on the basis of the Moscow Research Institute of Epidemiology, as well as 5 regional centers: in the St. Petersburg Research Institute of Epidemiology named after Louis Pasteur, the Ekaterinburg Research Institute of Viral Infections, the Omsk Research Institute of natural-focal infections, the Khabarovsk Research Institute of Epidemiology and Microbiology, the Scientific and Production Association 'Rostepidcomplex'. They were engaged in coordination of scientific research and organizational and methodological assistance to healthcare institutions. Nevertheless, as of 2019, there was no unified system of epidemiological monitoring of HIV infection. As a result, the number of first-time HIV cases detected by Rospotrebnadzor and the Ministry of Health may differ significantly. The data provided by the agencies in 2018 differed by 33.4% in overall growth rates across the country. In addition, epidemiological indicators depend on the method of statistical reporting. For example, after changing the method of recording the incidence of the disease in 2016 in Moscow, it decreased from 60.5 to 19.5 per 100 thousand people.

HIV spread prevention

Preventive measures to prevent HIV infection include comprehensive measures to reduce risk factors and inform the population. These include HIV antibody testing, ART, drug treatment for IDUs, prohibition of entry and deportation of HIV-positive foreigners, prevention of vertical transmission, sanitary regime in medical institutions, blood donation examinations, public counseling, preventive chemoprophylaxis.

By 2006, there were more than 100 AIDS prevention and control centers, 6 regional centers, and federal scientific-methodological and clinical centers functioning in Russia, as well as about a thousand Laboratory diagnostics laboratories, and more than 250 anonymous testing rooms. By 2017, there were 184 prevention centers and infectious disease hospitals, and more than 3,500 inpatient infectious disease units.

From 1987 to 2011, the government adopted a number of targeted national programs to combat HIV. These include the federal program 'Prevention and Control of Social Diseases'; priority national project 'Health'; project 'Prevention, Diagnosis and Treatment of Tuberculosis and AIDS' and others. By 2008 there were over 400 prevention projects in Russia, of which 75 were targeting high-risk groups. The main areas of focus were: reducing discrimination in society, informing teachers, schoolchildren and young people about risk factors, prevention of vertical HIV transmission, advanced training of healthcare professionals.

The programs of the Ministry of Health and the country's government include HIV-related projects to reduce stigma and discrimination; increased coverage of testing and antiretroviral therapy; advanced training for medical professionals; and educational activities. Festivals, lectures, seminars, round tables, flash mobs, and public events are held annually as part of this direction. For example, the all-Russian 'Stop HIV/AIDS' campaign, the International Conference on HIV/AIDS in Eastern Europe and Central Asia, the round table 'Problems of limiting the rights of people living with HIV', beauty contests among girls with HIV, voluntary testing actions and others. To draw attention to successful practices, the annual contest 'HIV/AIDS: To Know Is To Live' operates. It includes 10 nominations, and the works of the winners are combined into information catalogs. One of the main channels of education is the media. In addition to social advertising, federal channels broadcast television programs and documentaries. For example, a multi-part film about the everyday life of HIV-infected people 'Struggle with Fate', a TV series about women with HIV 'Fire'. Despite increased knowledge about the ways of HIV spread, according to surveys in 2010 41% of respondents considered the problem insufficiently covered. Anton Krasovsky, Director of the AIDS Center Foundation, pointed out the lack of a specific plan of action and the lack of coordination among government bodies.

In the first decade of the 21st century, about 10 million migrants came to Russia every year. To reduce the spread of the virus among them, the authorities launched 41 HIV prevention programs, trained employees of the Federal Migration Service.

Hygienic education of young people is one of the main directions of HIV prevention. It involves outreach teams; offices of trusted doctors were organized at dermatological and venereal diseases dispensaries and AIDS centers; informational animated cartoons and online games were created; training manuals for children were prepared; training campaigns were conducted in military units. The work is carried out by AIDS prevention and control centers, drug and skin and venereal dispensaries, rehabilitation centers, women's counseling and perinatal centers, preventive medicine centers and other. Minors receive services in such organizations free of charge, and make up to 90% of hospital visitors.

While adolescents and young adults accounted for 24.7% of newly diagnosed HIV infections in 2000, this number has been reduced to 2.9% over nine years. Nevertheless, according to the results of surveys in 2009, only 37% of 15-24 year olds could correctly name the channels of transmission. Most experts believe that coverage of HIV prevention and sex education in educational institutions would help change the situation. But contraception education is recognized as amoral by the authorities, which makes a small percentage of schoolchildren aware of the risks and check their HIV status. By 2018, the practice of open lectures about HIV in Higher education institution has also been minimized.

=== Public activism ===
Since the mid-1990s, activists have regularly held open campaigns: 'Safe sex – my choice' (1997), 'A reasonable person is a reasonable choice' (1999), 'This Little Thing Will Protect Both' (2000), 'It's Important to Be Protected' (2001) and others. All of them provided information about the ways HIV spreads and prevention. But the issues of adaptation of carriers of the virus in society were not covered. Although Natalya Gashnikova, head of the laboratory of the Scientific Center of Virology 'Vector,' called socialization of patients an important step in the fight against the epidemic.

By the end of the 20th century, self-help groups for people living with HIV began to form. Activists provided social and psychological assistance to carriers. Thus, one of the first groups was Positive, organized in 1994 by Nikolai Nedzelsky in Moscow. Under his leadership, they launched the country's first HIV hotline, nationwide forums and face-to-face consultations with psychologists, as well as the informational portal AIDS.ru. Later, the Imena Foundation and the INFO-Plus educational center, the first HIV service organizations in the capital, were established on the basis of the group. Soon similar organizations began to appear in all regions of the country: NGOs 'Yasen', 'Steps', 'Golos', 'Candle', 'Front AIDS', 'Delo', 'Keepers of the Rainbow', and 'Community of People Living with HIV/AIDS' foundations. The actions were covered by journalists of BBC, CNN, NBC, which helped draw public attention to the problems of HIV-infected people. As the 21st century began, self-help groups began to appear all over the country. For example, in Cheboksary the first such organization was established in 2004.

In the first decades of the 21st century, the number of non-profit and charitable organizations working with HIV-positive people has grown. These include Red Tulips of Hope, E. VA, Sibalt, the 'Russian Network of People Living with HIV/AIDS', the 'AIDS Front in Russia', the NGO Transatlantic Partners Against AIDS, and others. At the same time, non-profit cooperation communities began to emerge, such as the 'Silver Rose' support group for sex workers and their advocates. National projects to counter HIV involved public organizations: Medicine for You, Open Health Institute, Russian Health Care Foundation, Focus Media, Social Development and Information Center, AIDS-Info Link, and others. The Institute for Family Health Foundation and Sechenov University in Moscow participated in the prevention of vertical transmission.

=== International foundations ===
One of the first international humanitarian programs in Russia was 'Prevention, Diagnosis and Treatment of Tuberculosis and AIDS'. In 2003, the World Bank sponsored its launch, investing over $400 million. The main directions were: education, monitoring and evaluation of the epidemiological situation, advanced training of doctors and epidemiologists, procurement of equipment and consumables.

In 2004, the Global Fund to Fight HIV granted the Open Health Institute in Russia $88.74 million to launch 33 projects. In particular, the Global Unite project ('Globus') started in 10 regions of the country and the project 'Development of a Treatment Strategy for the Russian Population Vulnerable to HIV/AIDS' started in 22 regions. All of them were implemented with assistance from the non-profit foundations 'Open Health Institute', 'FOCUS Media', 'AIDS Infoshare', 'Russian Health Care', 'AIDS Foundation East-West', and 'Center for Social Development and Information'. The Global Fund has repeatedly extended funding and ended its work in Russia only in 2018.

In addition, by 2008, there were several other foundations and initiatives active in Russia:

- UNAIDS Secretariat monitors the implementation of international obligations, provides annual national consultations, technical assistance in strategic planning, etc. Within the framework of cooperation of the organization with the All-Russian Public Association of People Living with HIV and the All-Russian Harm Reduction Network, a non-profit partnership to support public health programs 'ESVERO' has been operating since 2010.
- World Health Organization conducts epidemiological surveillance and operational research, cross-national interagency forums, implementation and monitoring compliance with international protocols.
- UNICEF works with young people and families, development of youth clinics and prevention of vertical transmission of HIV. As of 2009, 117 services for youth health and HIV prevention were functioning in 28 regions; in eight of the most problematic regions programs for the integration of children with HIV into the general education system were conducted.
- United Nations Population Fund (UNFPA) evaluated the stigmatization of HIV-positive people, supported national programs. As part of the collaboration, the all-Russian 'Y-PEER' network was established to promote healthy lifestyles among adolescents on the basis of the peer-to-peer principle.
- UNESCO is engaged in HIV prevention among young people, projects to reduce discrimination, work with local media.
- United Nations Office on Drugs and Crime (UNODC) is conducting medico-social support to IDUs, provides treatment and preventive care.
- International Labour Organization (ILO) runs information campaigns in labor collectives, organized together with the Ministry of Health, Federation of Independent Trade Unions of Russia, Union of Industrialists and Entrepreneurs.
- United Nations Development Program (UNDP) supports the nongovernmental sector.
- United Nations High Commissioner for Refugees (UNHCR) distributes brochures, booklets and posters in native languages for refugees.
- U.S. Agency for International Development (USAID) is involved in the prevention and treatment of HIV infection in drug treatment facilities.

Since 2012, the Russian government has been pursuing a policy aimed at reducing foreign interference in the life of the country. UNAIDS, the main source of funding for HIV programs, has curtailed its activities in the country. Russian non-profit organizations funded by foreign foundations began to be recognized as 'foreign agents'. At the same time, NGO leaders complained about difficulties in obtaining government grants.

== Public and media attitudes ==
In the world, HIV infection was first described in 1981. In the early stages of the epidemic, the problem was covered by scientists from Western countries. And in Soviet people there was a misconception that HIV posed a danger only to the inhabitants of African and capitalist countries. It was categorized as a product of genetic engineering or military development. The mass media and mass audiences believed that HIV spread exclusively among drug addicts, homosexuals, and people with promiscuous sexual relations. In 1986, Minister of Health of the RSFSR Trubilin, Nikolai Trubilin stated:

In America AIDS has been raging since 1981, it's a Western disease. We have no base for the spread of this infection, as there is no drug addiction and prostitution in Russia.

For several years after the first infections in the USSR, the epidemic was not publicized. The first HIV infections were seen as a result of the immorality of carriers. The silencing of the problem led to the rapid spread of the virus. In all, by the time of the Dissolution of the Soviet Union there were more than 500 cases reported. Journalists covered the problem in a threatening light, provoking social intolerance and social stigmatization of carriers. For example, after the opening of an AIDS center in 1991 on the basis of an infectious disease hospital in Ust-Izhora, Leningrad Oblast, municipal deputies, the media, and local residents protested and demanded that the infected be moved to isolation. According to the recollections of Evgeny Voroshin, M. D., the local authorities deliberately misinformed the public about ways of HIV transmission, they claimed it could be transmitted through handshakes and through the air. Local residents sent their protest demanding the elimination of the medical center to President Boris Yeltsin, but by decision of the Ministry of Health the center continued its work.

Numerous public opinion studies at the end of the 20th and beginning of the 21st century demonstrated a fear and fatalism about carriers that became known as 'speedophobia'. Society attributed the infection exclusively to members of marginal groups, calling it the 'plague of the twentieth century'. The general public was unfamiliar with the ways in which the virus spread. Carriers of HIV were often forced to eat from personal utensils, wash common areas with chlorine after use, as their relatives mistakenly feared to get HIV in their homes through fomites. Sociologists noted both people's confidence in exaggerating the problem and their belief in a speedy resolution. The general public considered only people who had casual sex and drug addicts to be vulnerable. Most people did not consider it necessary to protect themselves if they had one or a small number of sexual partners. It was not until the mid-1990s that the public began to openly discuss sex education.

The strategy against the spread of HIV includes not only screening and antiretroviral therapy. A significant part of measures is aimed at the prevention of discrimination, social adaptation and support of HIV-positive citizens, education about the ways of infection, legal regulation, legal support, development of the institution of adoption and guardianship of children with HIV. Despite the measures taken, research by the National Research University Higher School of Economics 2017 shows: most Russians continued to associate HIV with marginal behavior, making it difficult to combat the epidemic. Schools refused to give lectures to teenagers about barrier contraceptives during sexual intercourse, though experts considered educating young people a necessary measure to prevent the spread of infection.

In 2016, Chief Sanitary Inspector of Russia Gennady Onishchenko called the immunodeficiency virus 'a humanity test of our society'. But citizens with HIV continued to regularly face discrimination. The problem of attitudes toward HIV-positive people among medical personnel was acute. Under Russian law, carriers have the right to medical care and to remain anonymous. They often encountered refusals, neglect and insults in medical institutions. Staff members lacked qualifications, for instance, nurses refused to take tests or measure blood pressure for fear of getting infected. According to the Positive Wave Foundation, about 20% of St. Petersburg dental clinics refused patients with HIV as early as the appointment time. Perm activists testified that doctors were the last to admit HIV-positive patients, often disclosing their status in the hallways.

HIV denialism in Russia

The practice of refusing antiretroviral therapy is common among HIV-infected people. Often people do not realize the danger of the virus or do not believe in the effectiveness of treatment. Such carriers are referred to as AIDS dissidents, as they pose a danger to themselves and others. In 2018, a bill was drafted to prohibit the dissemination of calls to abandon ART and the promotion of HIV denialism. But individual activists continued provocations, disrupting the work of the testing crews, or donating blood, aware of their status.

In addition, cases have been known in which young infected people wanted to stop taking their medication as a form of suicide, provoked by problems with their peers and family.

== See also ==
- Health in Russia

== Sources ==
- Dmitriev, R. V. (2009). "Transformation of the Socio-Ecological Situation of HIV Infection in the North Caucasian Federal District under the Impact of External Migration". South of Russia: Ecology, Development (3): 131–137.
- Zagdyn, Z. M. (2019). "System of Registration of Cases of HIV Infection in the Russian Federation". Modern Problems of Health Care and Medical Statistics (in Russian).
- Bogachev, V. V. (2014). "Molecular and epidemiological features of the spread of HIV infection in Novosibirsk Region in 2008-2012. Author's abstract" (PDF). State Research Center for Virology and Biotechnology "Vector". Koltsovo: 22.
- Peksheva, O. U.; Zaytseva, N. N. (2014). "Modern Molecular Genetic Methods in the Epidemiological Surveillance of HIV Infection". MediAl: 122–134.
- Vorobyova, N. N.; Ivanova, Elvira (2013). "Epidemiology and infectious diseases". Epidemiology and Infectious Diseases (4): 46–49.
- Neshumaev, D. A.; Kazennova, E. V.; Rukavitzin, D. V. (2014). "Molecular Epidemiological Analysis of the HIV Epidemic in Blagoveshchensk and Khabarovsk (Russian Far East)". Virology Issues. 59 (4): 31–36.
- Bazykina, E. A.; Turkutiukov, V. B.; Trotzenko, O. E. (2019). "Epidemiological surveillance in the Far Eastern Federal District for HIV infection, including co-infection with Hepatitis B and C". Epidemiology and Vaccine Prophylaxis (in Russian): 14–24. doi:10.31631/2073-3046-2019-18-4-14-24. S2CID 242823826.
- Kolomeets, A. N. (2016). "Epidemiological and molecular genetic features of HIV in infected persons in the Siberian Federal District". Medical Almanac: 85–88. doi:10.21145/2499-9954-2016-3-85-88 (inactive 19 January 2026).
- Borovsky, I. V.; Tumentzev, A. T.; Kalacheva, G. A. (2014). "Evolution of the HIV epidemic in the Siberian Federal District". Siberian Medical Journal (Irkutsk). 124 (1): 91–94.
- Radzikhovskaya, M. V.; Moskvicheva, M. G. (2016). "Comparative analysis of the dynamics and direction of the epidemiological process of HIV infection in the Chelyabinsk Oblast, the Urals Federal District and the Russian Federation". Ural Medical Magazine: 135–141.
- Parfenova, O. V.; Peksheva, O. U.; Zaytseva, N. N. (2013). "Mutations which influence the resistance of HIV to antiretroviral therapy in Privolzhsky federal district in 2008-2012". Medical Almanac: 79–82.
- Elchaninova, T. A. (2014). "Results of epidemiological surveillance of HIV infection in Primorsky Krai". Health. Medical Ecology. Science (in Russian): 137–141.
- Petrov, S. P.; Savenko, V. I. (2012). "Comparative Evaluation of Screening Surveys for HIV in Stavropol Krai". Главный Врач Юга России: 11–12.
- Belyakov, N. A.; Lioznov, D. A. (2015). "Trends in the HIV Epidemic in the Northwest of the Russian Federation". Medical Academic Journal: 59–69.
- Utugova, V. N.; Svetlichnaya, T. G.; Nefedov, A. V. (2014). "Evolution of the HIV epidemic in the Arkhangelsk Region in 1992-2011". Human Ecology: 50–56. doi:10.17816/humeco17259.
- Ogurtsova, S. V.; Smolskaya, T. T. (2011). "HIV in the Northwestern Federal District of the Russian Federation in 2009". Infections and Immune System. 1 (4): 311–318.
- Dremova, N. B.; Alekseev, I. V. (2013). "A Monitoring Research of the HIV/AIDS Epidemic on the Basis of Situational Analysis". Pharmacoeconomics. Modern Pharmacoeconomics and Pharmacoepidemiology. 6 (3): 23–26.
- Grishina, L. P.; Zapariy, N. S. (2011). "Specifics of the formation of primary disability in the adult population due to diseases caused by HIV in the federal districts of the Russian Federation, 2007-2009 dynamics". Russia's National Priorities: 190–193.
- The HIV/AIDS Threat: Assessing the Awareness and Readiness of Employers (Associations and Business Leaders) to Address the Threat (PDF). Geneva: International Labour Organization. 2007. p. 237. ISBN 978-92-2-420088-5.
- Naumenko, V. V. (2015). "Description of the epidemic process and leading risk factors of HIV infection in a large metropolitan area". Epidemiology and Infectious Diseases: 15–18. doi:10.17816/EID40870.
- Abashina, V. L.; Khomichuk, T. F.; Grebenkova, L. K. (2010). "Epidemiological aspects of the spread of HIV infection". Health. Medical Ecology. Science. 41–42 (1–2): 114–116.
- Moskaleychik, F. F.; Laga, V. Y. (2015). "Rapid spread of the HiV-1 circular recombinant 0RF02-AG in Russia and neighboring countries". Fundamental Medicine. 60 (6): 14–19.
- Lapovok, I. A. (2017). "Molecular epidemiological analysis of HIV-1 variants circulating in Russia in 1987—2015". Terapevticheskii Arkhiv. 89 (11): 44–49. doi:10.17116/terarkh2017891144-49. PMID 29260745.
- Onishenko, G. G. (2010). "National Report of the Russian Federation on the Implementation of the Declaration of Commitment on HIV/AIDS, adopted during the 26th Special Session of the UN General Assembly, June 2001" (PDF). Federal Service for Supervision of Consumer Rights Protection and Human Welfare: 80. Archived from the original (PDF) on 2021-07-25.
- Beyrer, C.; Wirtz, A. L.; O’Hara, G.; Léon, N.; Kazatchkine, M. (2017). "The expanding epidemic of HIV-1 in the Russian Federation". PLOS Medicine. 14 (11) e1002462. doi:10.1371/journal.pmed.1002462. PMC 5705067. PMID 29182631.
- Taisheva, L. A. (2009). "Hygienic evaluation of behavioral risk of HIV infection in youth". Kazan Medical Journal. 90 (3).
- Kazennova, E. V. (2013). "HIV-1 Genetic Variants in the Asian Part of Russia: a Study (2005-2010)". Virology Issues. 58 (4): 28–35. PMID 24354062.
- Kazennova E. V.; Laga V. Yu.; Gromov K. B.; Sankov M. N.; Popova E. S.; Igumnova E. G.; Oparina E. N.; Sorokina T .A.; Bobkova M. R. (2017). "Molecular epidemiological analysis of HIV infection in the northern port cities of Russia". Issues of Virology. 62 (4): 154–161.
- Zaytseva, N. N.; Parfenova, O. V.; Efimov, E. I. (2013). "Analysis of the prevalence of HIV resistant strains to antiretroviral drug in Privolzhsky Federal District". Virology Issues. 58 (6): 39–41.
- Zaytseva, N. N. (2016). "Modern Molecular Genetic Technologies in the Supervision over HIV-1 Subtypes Circulation". Modern Technologies in Medicine. 8 (1): 121–127.
- UNAIDS (2006). Development of the AIDS epidemic (PDF). Geneva: WHO. p. 86.
- Shabunova, A. (2010). Population Health in Russia: Status and Dynamics. Moscow: ISEDT RAS. p. 579. ISBN 9785932991619.
- UNAIDS (2005). In the HIV/AIDS High Risk Zone: Young People in Eastern Europe and Central Asia (PDF) (Report). The United Nations Joint United Nations Programme on HIV/AIDS (UNAIDS). pp. 1–12.
- Seredkina, E.; Khasanova, R. (2019). "Mortality Rate From Socially Significant Diseases in 2007–2017". RANEPA: 1–30. SSRN 3341383.
- Shaldina, M. V.; Pirogova, I. A. (2017). "The antiretroviral therapy as the main method of treatment of HIV infection". Bulletin of the Council of Young Scientists and Specialists of the Chelyabinsk Region (in Russian). 4 (19).
- Pronina, S. I. (2014). Children and HIV. Prevention of Vertical Mother-to-Child Transmission of HIV (Information and Resource Book) (PDF). Regional Public Organization for the Protection of Children's Rights "Right of the Child.
- UNAIDS (2002). Report on the global HIV/AIDS epidemic (PDF). Geneva: Joint United Nations Programme on HIV/AIDS. p. 237. ISBN 92-9173-193-5.
