= Konstantin Dobrynin =

Russian politician (born 1976)

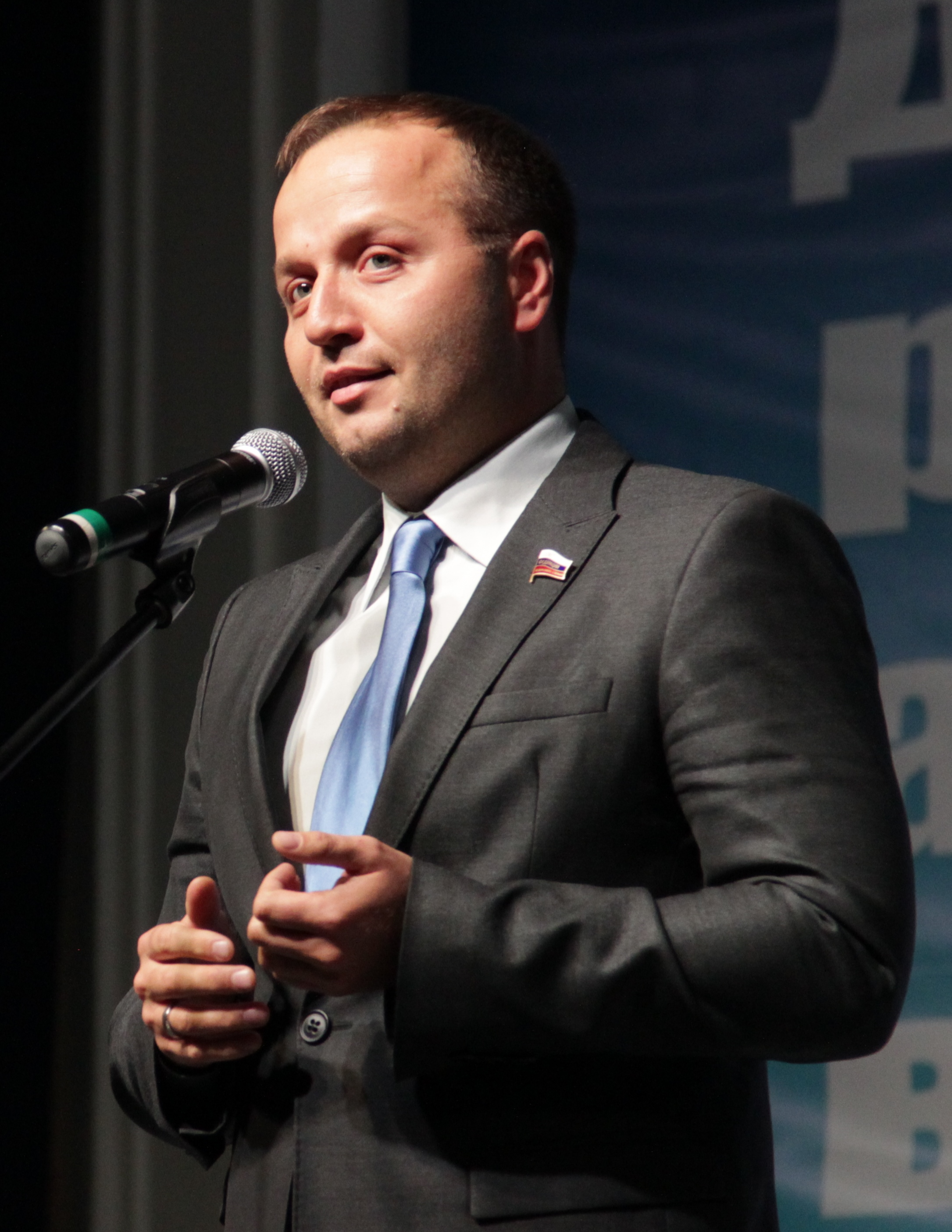

State Secretary of the Russian Federal Bar Association
- In office 3 October 2015 – 3 March 2022
- Preceded by: Nikolay Pitirimovich Lvov
- Succeeded by: Viktor Nikolayevich Pavlenko

Member of the Federation Council from the Arkhangelsk Oblast
- In office 4 March 2012 – 25 September 2015

Personal details
- Born: 23 November 1976 (age 49) Leningrad, Russian SFSR, Soviet Union
- Education: Saint Petersburg State University
- Profession: Attorney, politician

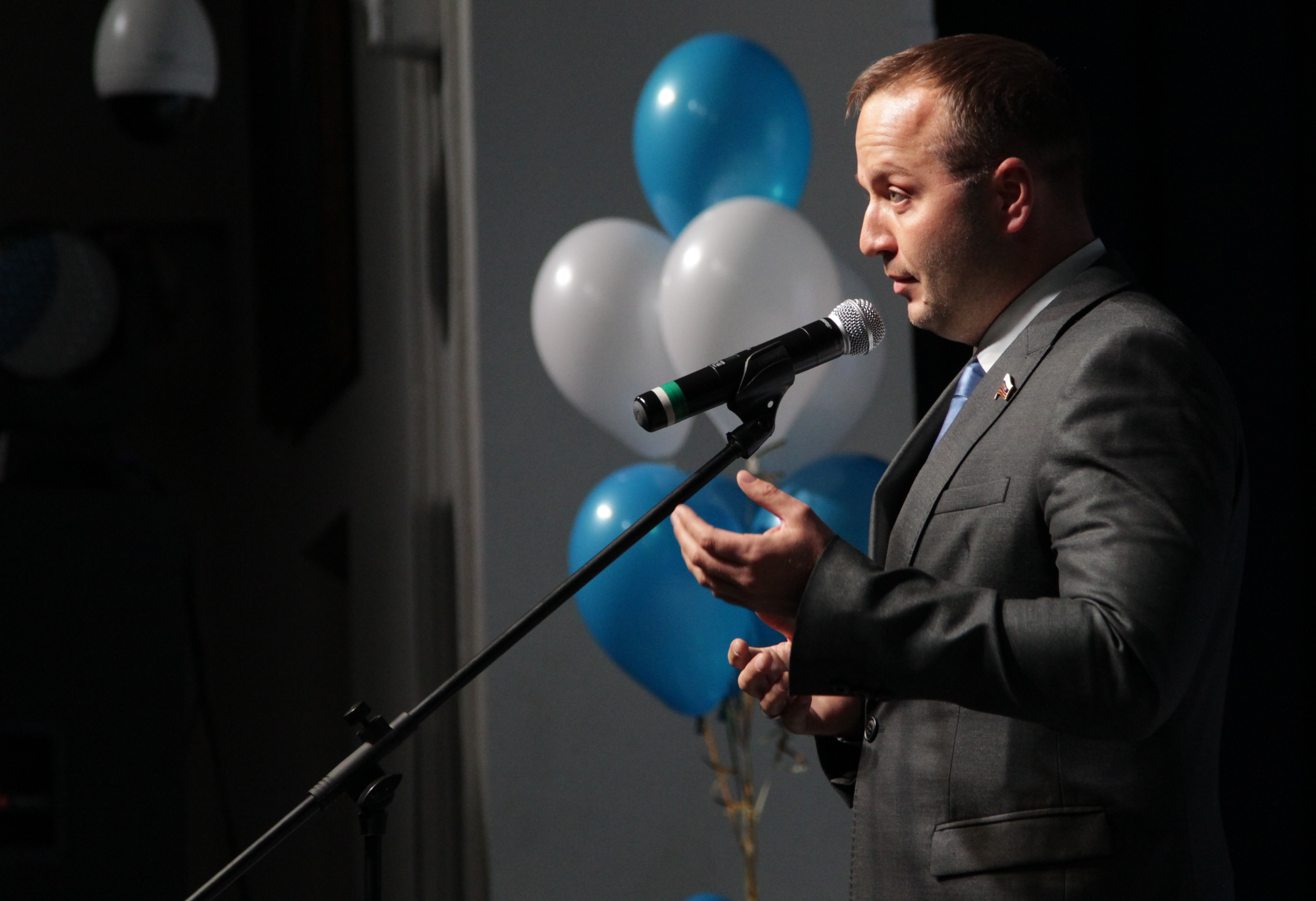
Konstantin Dobrynin

Konstantin Eduardovich Dobrynin (Russian: Константин Эдуардович Добрынин, born November 23, 1976, in Leningrad, RSFSR, USSR) is a Russian attorney, politician, and public figure.

He was the State Secretary of the Russian Federal Bar Association from 2015 to 2022 and a member of the RFBA board from 2020.

From 2012 to 2015, he served as a member of the Federation Council from the Arkhangelsk Oblast. He was a deputy chair of the Federation Council Committee on Constitutional Legislation and State Building.

== Early years ==
Konstantin Dobrynin was born on November 23, 1976. He graduated from the Law Department of the Saint Petersburg State University in 1998.

== Career ==
From 2001 to 2004, he worked as the deputy director and acting head of the legal department at the CJSC Ilim Pulp Enterprise. In 2011, Dobrynin became director of development for the JSC Ilim Group. He participated in the dispute between the Basic Element and the Ilim Pulp Enterprise. He worked in the pulp and paper industry for an extensive period.

In February 2012, Dobrynin won the municipal election in the Yemsovskoye Rural Settlement of the Arkhangelsk Oblast.

In March 2012, he became the Federation Council senator and represented the interests of the Arkhangelsk Oblast government in the Federation Council as a deputy chair of the Federation Council Committee on Constitutional Legislation and State Building.

In August 2013, Dobrynin requested that the Attorney General of the Russian Federation investigate the activities of the groups affiliated with the Neo-Nazi Maxim Martsinkevich. The groups filmed bullying of LGBT teens, disseminated the videos on the Internet and called for violence against the LGBT community. The Attorney General was asked to investigate whether these actions violated the Criminal Code of the Russian Federation, specifically Article 133 of the Criminal Code directed against forcing individuals to commit sexual acts. Senator Dobrynin expressed his dismay at the lack of reaction on part of law enforcement agencies and stated the opinion that the groups were tied to Nazi and nationalist ideologies.

Dobrynin became known for publicly criticizing plans for tougher legal norms, in particular, the Roskomnadzor's ban on publishing the causes for suicides of terminally ill people, the law on the right to be forgotten on the Internet, the Dima Yakovlev Law, as well as Irina Yarovaya's bill to prohibit the criticism of the Allies in World War II. In late June 2015, Dobrynin supported the possibility of recognizing same-sex marriages in Russia and the need to decrease the level of social aggression toward sexual minorities.

In addition, he called for the resignation of the State Duma members who attract publicity through sensational and irrational laws. He also proposed that the head of the Investigative Committee of the Russian Federation Alexander Bastrykin probe into the mental state of Vitaly Milonov, a member of St. Petersburg municipal legislature.

Dobrynin made numerous appeals for improving Russia's relations with the United States and Western European countries and publicly called for restarting international relations and easing international tensions. Specifically, he opposed Russia's withdrawal from the U.S.-run FLEX student exchange program, appealing to President Dmitry Medvedev. The program was created in 1992 by former Senator Bill Bradley as a way to achieve mutual understanding between the two cultures long separated from each other by the Iron Curtain. Nevertheless, Russia ultimately withdrew from the program.

Along with Senators Andrey Klishas and Vadim Tyulpanov, Dobrynin authored a number of bills to reform criminal procedure and eliminate procedural absurdities. For instance, his initiative led to the passage of the federal law that entitled the detained individuals to make one call within three hours of being brought to a law enforcement facility. Some journalists referred to this law as a Russian counterpart to the U.S. Miranda warning.

He was also one of the authors of the legislation that allowed motorists to use automobile video recordings as evidence at administrative hearings. The law received strong support from automobile owners. Initially, the legislation was proposed by the LDPR Duma members headed by Yaroslav Nilov but received no support from the government. Following the involvement of the respective Federation Council committee and experts from the Federal Bar Association, the bill was amended, approved by the Government and the Presidential Administration and passed into law.

Dobrynin sharply criticized the Culture Minister Vladimir Medinsky after the minister lashed out at the State Archive head Sergey Mironenko who called the heroic act of Panfilov's 28 Guardsmen a myth. At a meeting with archive workers, Medinsky said that the State Archive managers should be doing their job rather than making their own assessments of archived documents. Thereafter, Dobrynin publicly remarked that Medinsky might want to consider changing careers.

On August 14, 2015, Dobrynin and Senator Vadim Tyulpanov prepared and submitted the bill on amending the Federal Law on Basic Guarantees of Child's Rights in the Russian Federation, also known as the "baby-box law".

The bill proposed that the subjects of the Russian Federation make their own decisions based on local culture and traditions on whether to create sites to anonymously abandon newborn babies on their territory. The requirements for such sites and their use were to be set by the Russian Health Ministry. Dobrynin stated that "baby boxes are necessary; they are just one of the legal mechanisms that guarantee the right to life and reduce neonaticide, while the final decision on the need for baby boxes have to be made only by regions on the basis of their characteristics, rather than by the likes of Mizulina and Astakhov." But the bill received no support at the time. After Dobrynin left the parliament, Senator Tyulpanov and the State Duma member Oksana Pushkina introduced two more versions of the bill amended with Dobrynin's participation in his new role as the State Secretary of the Russian Federal Bar Association. However, none of the bills have been passed into law to date.

In September 2015, Dobrynin introduced a bill to counteract the rehabilitation of Stalinism (bill on de-Stalinization). In it, he proposed that publications justifying Stalin's political purges be deemed extremist. In addition, he proposed prohibiting "memorializing individuals implicated in the crimes of Stalin's totalitarian regime when naming geographic sites, streets, roads, and metro stations". At the same time, he composed and sent an official statement to Russian President Vladimir Putin, detailing a program of essential steps toward de-Stalinization of Russia. After Dobrynin left the parliament, the bill was declined by the State Duma legal department due to lack of financial and economic foundation.

In August 2015, the governor of Arkhangelsk Oblast stated that Dobrynin was not included in the prospective senators' list, while Dobrynin himself expressed a wish to change jobs to focus on social and political activism and law.

=== Later work ===
On 5 October 2022 Dobrynin, deputy president of the Federal Chamber of Attorneys, resigned from the Chamber's board. Vadim Klyuvgant, vice president of the Federal Chamber of Attorneys, and colleague of Dobrynin resigned his post as well the same day. They cited impossibility to continue to fulfill their duties. Media speculated that the real reason was their disagreement with the Russia's annexation of the Ukrainian territories.

Dobrynin is a senior partner in the Pen & Paper law firm. He also owns a real estate business.

From December 2016 to December 2017, he defended the Russian film director Alexei Uchitel in a conflict with the State Duma member Natalia Poklonskaya. Poklonskaya attempted to block the release of Matilda, the film Uchitel directed, as blasphemous. In the course of the conflict, Poklonskaya submitted 43 parliamentary inquiries to the Attorney General's Office, including some asking the prosecutors to commence a criminal case against Alexei Uchitel. She also declared Dobrynin an outlaw. All the inquiries generated negative responses. The events revealed a phenomenon of "Orthodox terrorism" for the first time ever in Russia. The film distribution was thwarted by the threats of arson and vandalism against movie theaters and other private property. The threats came from the leader of an unregistered organization The Christian State – Holy Rus Alexander Kalinin and were later carried out in Yekaterinburg, Saint Petersburg, and Moscow. Two cars were set on fire near Dobrynin's office in Moscow. As a result, five criminal cases were commenced against the individuals preventing the release of the film, including Kalinin himself, who was arrested and subsequently convicted. Natalia Poklonskaya had been trying to commence a criminal case against Dobrynin, alleging in her applications to the investigative agencies that since September 4, 2017, the film director Alexei Uchitel and his representative Konstantin Dobrynin had been accusing a State Duma member of committing crimes, creating a terrorist organization, and covering up its activities. Her applications to commence a criminal case were denied.

In 2016-2019 Dobrynin was a member of the board of trustees at the AIDS.Center Foundation founded by Anton Krasovsky in July 2016. The foundation seeks to help HIV-positive individual and inform the public about the issues of HIV and AIDS. In 2017, Dobrynin proposed that the government eliminate Article 122 "Criminal transmission of HIV" from the Penal Code, insofar as it "increases stigmatization of HIV-infected people".

As the State Secretary of the Russian Federal Bar Association, Dobrynin sharply criticized the bill introduced to the State Duma in April 2018 in response to U.S. sanctions against Russia. The bill sought to "minimize threats to the interests and security of the Russian Federation, rights and freedom of its citizens, coming from the United States of America and/or other foreign states." Dobrynin publicly urged the Russian lawmakers "to soberly assess the risks for the country from such, however general, initiative that is certainly harmful for the country" before passing the bill into law in three readings. The bill proposed prohibiting or limiting "performance of certain jobs (services), including consulting, auditing and legal services, on the territory of the Russian Federation to provide for state and municipal needs, as well as the need for certain legal entities." After extensive criticism from the experts, the bill was not passed.

Dobrynin was the first Russian lawyer to publicly support Ukrainian sailors who were detained – in his view, illegally – during an incident in the Kerch Strait. He appealed to the Russian authorities for the release of the sailors numerous times.

During the 2018 presidential election, Dobrynin was the head counsel for the presidential candidate Ksenia Sobchak and, along with Pen & Paper law firm, was responsible for the full array of campaign legal issues.

During the summer 2019 radiation accident at the Arkhangelsk Oblast military range, he accused the authorities of concealing information and called for transparency, warning that concealing information from the public may result in criminal prosecution.

Dobrynin was one of the authors of the anti-war message by the members of Board of the Russian Federal Bar Association published on February 27, soon after the start of the Russian invasion of Ukraine. The text was published on the Association's web site and contained a call for an immediate cessation of military activities. Soon the message was deleted from the web site, and one of the signers had his signature removed. At the same time, other board members published a message in support of the operation conducted by the Russian Federation in Ukraine, which was also deleted from the web site. The Federal Bar Association did not comment on the removal of these materials. The copies are available in the Internet archive.

On March 3, 2022 Dobrynin resigned the position of the State Secretary of the Federal Bar Association, which he also announced on his Facebook page. He explained that he is unable to perform his functions under the current circumstances.

Dobrynin is a lawyer for the first Soviet President Mikhail Gorbachev and provides legal services to the Gorbachev Foundation. After numerous appearances of fake statements attributed to Gorbachev on the internet and fake Gorbachev Foundation web sites, Dobrynin issued a warning that these actions are unacceptable in March 2022.

Dobrynin reminded that "those deliberately spreading false information, including those doing so under someone's name or under cover of other individuals are liable for their actions and can face criminal prosecution." Dobrynin's statement was published on the Foundation's web site and extensively covered by the media.

He is a regular writer and columnist for The Washington Post, The Wall Street Journal, and The Washington Times.

Since 2019, Dobrynin has been a member of the Board of Trustees of the European University at Saint Petersburg.

Since 2019, he has been permanently residing in the Great Britain.

Since 2020, he has been a member of the Board of Trustees of the Institute of Law and Public Policy.

Since 2020, he has been a member of the Board of the Russian Federal Bar Association.

=== Filmmaking ===
In 2019, Dobrynin came up with an original idea and produced a short film entitled The Painting. An acclaimed Russian film director and clip maker, Sergey Kalvarskiy, co-authored the project.

The Painting tells the story of Ivan, a young Russian painter. He receives a state commission to create an artwork on a biblical theme for the “Preserving Values” exhibition. Ivan chooses an unorthodox interpretation for his work, which incurs the wrath of the conservative Russian parliament member Tatiana Nagibina. She launches a crusade against the painting and its author.

The film is largely based on the true story of the Russian film director Alexei Uchitel. In his film Matilda, he depicted an affair between czar Nicholas II and ballerina Matilda Kshesinskaya. In 2016 – 2017, ultraconservative Russian Orthodox Christians led by the State Duma member Natalia Poklonskaya started a public campaign against Uchitel. Uchitel had to retain Dobrynin and the attorneys from the Pen & Paper law firm to represent him and defend his rights, including the right to creative expression. As a result, Matilda was screened in Russian movie theaters.

The Painting won some prizes at international movie festivals. In September 2019, it was recognized as best comedy at the Festigious international independent film festival. Kalvarskiy was named the best short film director.
