= Pavel Lobkov =

Russian journalist (born 1967)

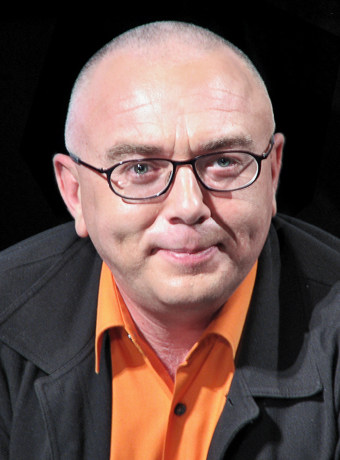
- Born: Pavel Albertovich Lobkov; 21 September 1967 (age 58); Sestroretsk, Leningrad, Russian SFSR, Soviet Union
- Education: Saint Petersburg State University
- Occupation: Journalist
- Years active: 1990–present

Pavel Albertovich Lobkov (Russian: Павел Альбертович Лобков; born 21 September 1967) is a Russian journalist. He was one of the main presenters and commentators on the television channel TV Rain (2012–2021). Previously, he was the host of the program Progress with Pavel Lobkov on Petersburg – Channel 5 (2007–2008), NTV (1993–2006; 2008–2011), and the program correspondent Itogi (1993–2001).

== Biography ==
Lobkov was born in the city of Sestroretsk (Sestroretsk District of Leningrad; now in the Kurortny District of St. Petersburg). In 1988, he graduated from the biological faculty of the Leningrad State University with a degree in botany. He studied at the graduate school of the Botanical Institute of Komarov Academy of Sciences of the USSR. Internship in Holland, but he did not defend the thesis.

Since 1990, Lobkov worked as a correspondent for the information service of the TRK Petersburg, including the Fifth Wheel program. Since October 1993 – Director of the representation of NTV in St. Petersburg. From 1995 to 2004, he was a correspondent for the NTV information service. He did subjects for the information programs Segodnya, Itogi, Namedni, and Country and World.

From 1995 to 1997, together with Yevgeny Kiselyov and Leonid Parfyonov, he led the program Hero of the Day. Laureate of TEFI-1998 as the best reporter.

Since August 2006 the author of a number of documentary projects at Petersburg – Channel 5. He was also the chief editor of the Directorate of Documentary Broadcasting of the Channel 5 and directed the information and analytical program Week in a Large Country.

In 2008, Lobkov returned to NTV, where he was dismissed on 16 January 2012, before the end of the contract.

Since February 2012, Lobkov works on the TV Rain channel. In February 2013 he recorded a video message for the project Be Stronger, directed against homophobia. He was the host of the program We Ride at Home on Rain, paired with Sasha Filipenko. Now he is one of the leading final news and the weekly program The Burden of News.

== Personal life ==
Pavel Lobkov was never married and has no children. On 1 December 2015, on the air of TV Rain, Lobkov announced that he is HIV-positive since 2003. He is a member of the Board of Trustees of the AIDS.Center Foundation.

In 2019, he came out as gay.

In December 2023, Lobkov said he was beaten at Patriarch Ponds in Moscow, in what he suggested was a homophobic attack, but he did not give further details.

== Filmography ==
=== Documentary ===
- 1999: The Mausoleum
- 2001: USSR: The Last Days
- 2008: Tulip, Rose, Orchid
- 2009: Genes Against Us
- 2009: The Dictatorship of the Brain
- 2009: Infected: Enemy Within Us
- 2010: Tablet from Old Age
- 2010: The Formula of Love
- 2010: Life for Food
- 2010: The Power of Sleep
- 2010: Life Without Pain
- 2011: The Gene of Power
- 2011: The Strange Sex
- 2011: The Great Deception of the Vision
- 2011: The Empire of Feelings

=== Feature films ===
- 2011: Amazon (cameo appearance)
