= Krasovsky case =

Scandal caused by a Russian propagandist

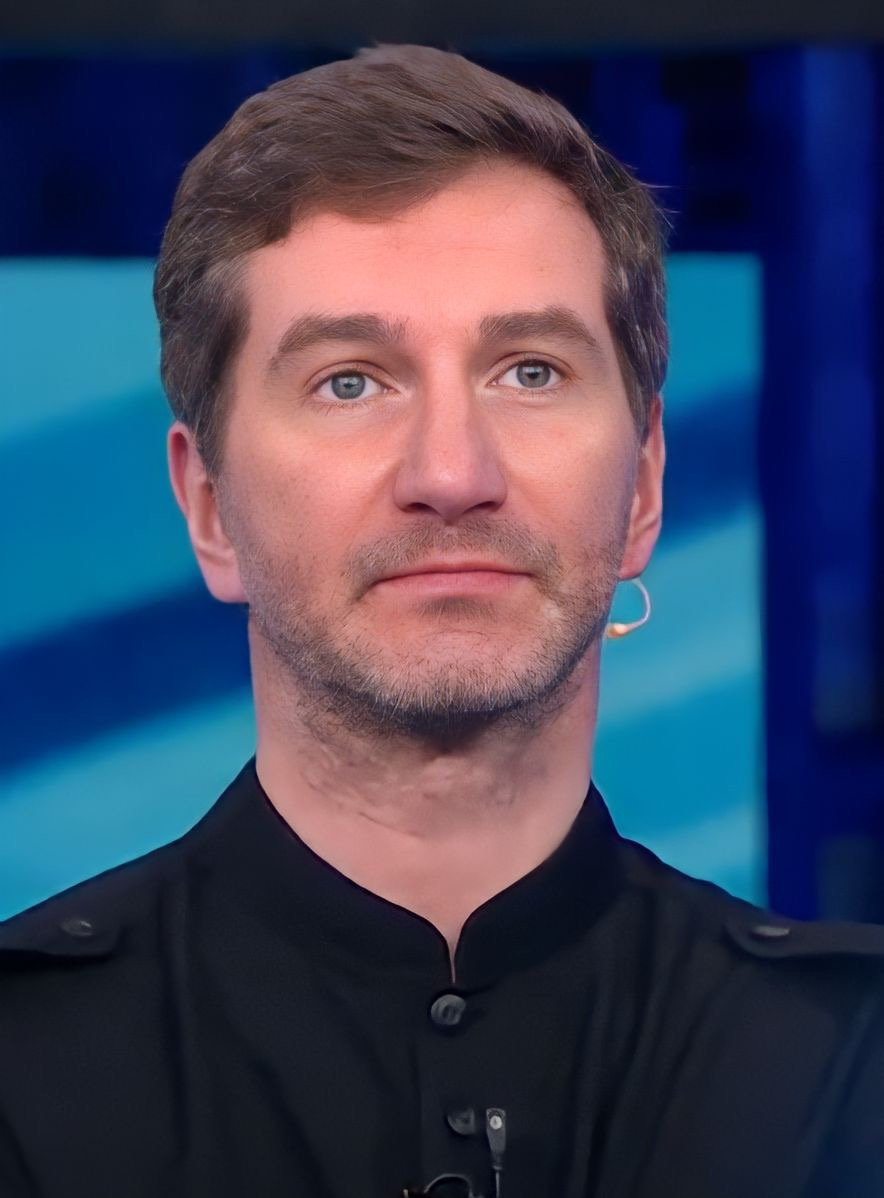
Anton Krasovsky in 2022

The Krasovsky case is a political scandal which was caused by a statements made by Russian propagandist Anton Krasovsky on October 20, 2022 who said that Ukrainian children who hate Russia should be drowned and burned. The scandal caused a wide public outcry both in Russia and Ukraine. The comments were made in the context of the ongoing Russian invasion of Ukraine.

== Background ==
Russian journalist Anton Krasovsky was previously known for his radical statements. In April 2021, Krasovsky announced his readiness to drown supporters of the Saint Petersburg opposition to the authorities in the Moyka.

== Krasovsky statements ==
The incident occurred during Krasovsky's "Antonyms" program on RT on 20 October, the guest of which was the science fiction writer Sergei Lukyanenko. During the conversation, Lukyanenko told how in 1980, as a child, he traveled to Ukraine, where the children said that "Ukraine is occupied by Muscovites." The writer emphasized that "these were absolutely Russian, Russian-speaking boys." Krasovsky replied:

And it was necessary to drown such children directly in the Tisza [River], right there, where the "ducklings swim". It's right to drown these children. Stoke! Right in the Tisza. This is not your method, since you are intelligent people and science fiction writers. But this was our method. The child says to you “we are occupied by Muscovites” - and immediately you throw it directly into the river's violent, turbulent currents.

— Anton Krasovsky

Lukyanenko replied that in Russia “traditionally they used rods” for punishment, to which Krasovsky said that children could also be burned: “Each hut there is called Smerekov’s hut. And right into this Smerekov’s hut to hammer and burn.”

After the release of the program, Krasovsky wrote on the Telegram channel that he had “a wonderful broadcast with Sergei Lukyanenko,” but then deleted this message.

== Reaction ==
On 23 October, Ukraine labeled the Russian state broadcaster RT as a genocide instigator following Krasovsky's statements. Ukrainian Foreign Minister Dmytro Kuleba said after Krasovsky's remarks that the RT channel should be banned worldwide.

After attention to the release with Krasovsky and Lukyanenko, the RT channel removed the recording of the broadcast. Excerpts from the program are still available online.

On 23 October, RT editor-in-chief Margarita Simonyan described Krasovsky's statement as "wild and disgusting" and suspended his work on RT, though on 26 October she suggested forgiving him, as Orthodox Christianity requires.

On the same day, Krasovsky apologized:

Look, I'm really embarrassed that I somehow didn't see that edge. About the children. Well, it happens like this: you're sitting on the air, you're going wild. And you can't stop. I apologize to everyone who was freaked out by that. I apologize to Margarita (Simonyan), to everyone for whom it seemed wild, unthinkable and irresistible. I hope you'll forgive me.

— Anton Krasovsky

Krasovsky's comments were heavily criticized by Russian media, journalists and bloggers, including the Moskovskij Komsomolets newspaper, journalist Maxim Kononenko and by Lukyanenko himself.

== Possible criminal case for extremism ==
The head of the Investigative Committee of Russia Alexander Bastrykin instructed to check the statements of Anton Krasovsky for extremism. According to the ICR, “on the social network, one of the users” asked Bastrykin to check “a number of harsh statements” by the director of RT broadcasting.

== See also ==
- What Russia Should Do with Ukraine
- Anti-Ukrainian sentiment
