= Anton Krasovsky =

Russian television personality

- Антон Красовский
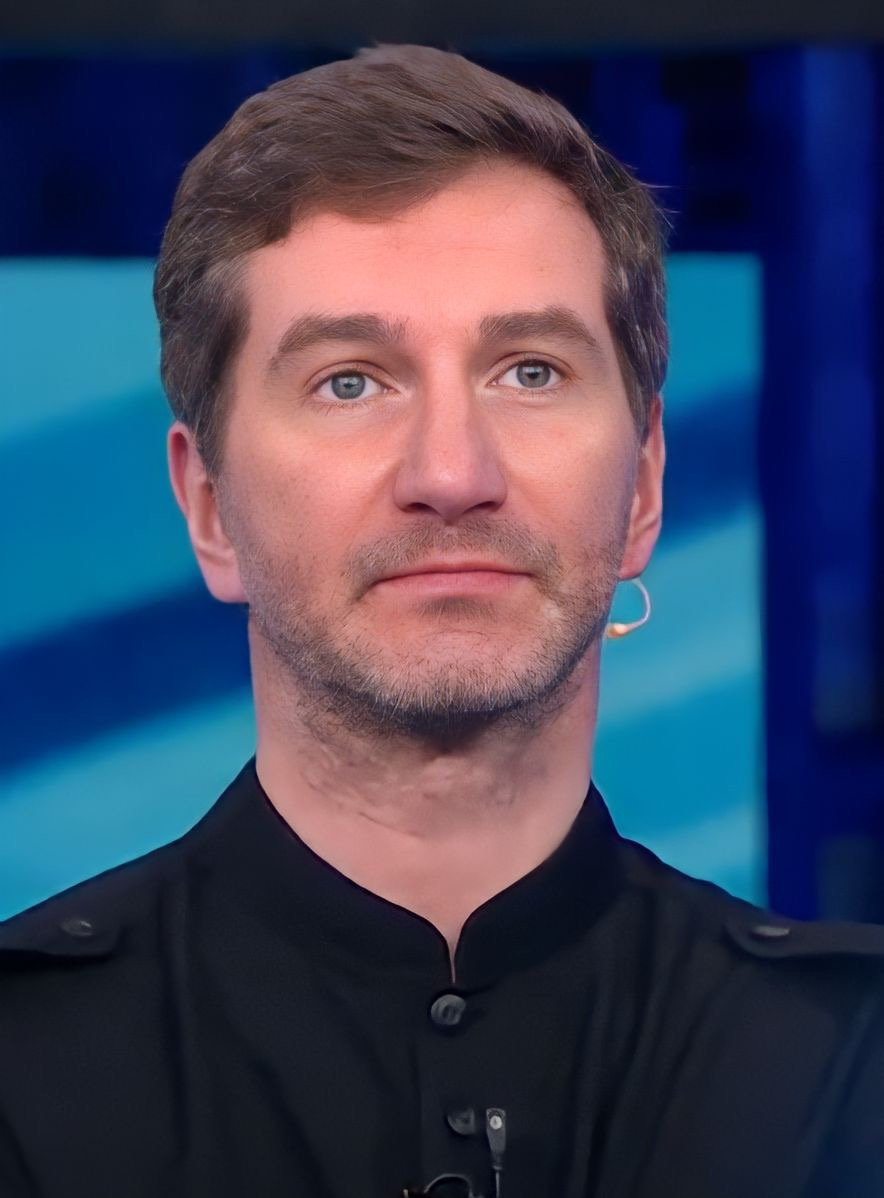
- Krasovsky in 2022
- Born: Anton Vyacheslavovich Kuznetsov-Krasovsky; 18 July 1975 (age 51); Podolsk, Russian SFSR, Soviet Union
- Citizenship: Russia; USA
- Education: Maxim Gorky Literature Institute
- Occupations: Journalist; Television presenter; Campaign manager
- Years active: 1996–present

Voice of Anton Krasovsky
From the live of Echo of Moscow
21 September 2013

Anton Vyacheslavovich Krasovsky (Kuznetsov-Krasovsky) (Russian: Антон Вячеславович Красовский (Кузнецов-Красовский); born 18 July 1975) is a Russian television presenter, journalist and activist. He was a presenter and director of Russian-language broadcasting on the Russian state-controlled broadcaster RT from 2020 until his suspension in October 2022, after comments he made caused a backlash. Previously, he came to prominence for his defense of gay rights in Russia, including his criticism of the Russian gay propaganda law.

== Life and career ==
Krasovsky was born on 18 July 1975 in Podolsk. From 1986 to 1989, he lived in the Ukrainian town of Kuznetsovsk (now Varash), where his father worked at the Rivne Nuclear Power Plant. After graduating from school, he studied at the Maxim Gorky Literature Institute. In 2011 Krasovsky participated in the presidential campaign of Mikhail Prokhorov. He also worked as a journalist and editor at the pro-Kremlin NTV channel. He previously worked at Kommersant, Yandex, Nezavisimaya Gazeta and Vogue.

Krasovsky later began work at another pro-Kremlin channel, Kontr TV, started by himself and Sergey Minaev in December 2012. On 25 January 2013, during a discussion of a proposed national ban on "homosexual propaganda", Krasovsky revealed his homosexuality, stating on-air, "I'm gay and I'm as much a human-being as President Putin, as Premier Medvedev, as members of the State Duma." (Russian: Я гей и такой же человек, как президент Путин, как премьер Медведев, как депутаты Государственной думы.) His statement was not made available online or was deleted soon afterwards, and on 28 January Krasovsky resigned from the channel and denounced the working environment there. According to other sources, he was fired the same day. His face was soon censored from the show website and removed from the TV show's archives.

Krasovsky stated that he came out because he had had enough of feeling like a hypocrite. He later referred to the channel's entire output as "propaganda." In May, following the murder of Vlad Tornovy reportedly because he was thought to be gay, Krasovsky published an article in The Guardian denouncing homophobia in Russia. He wrote:

How did it come about that today in Russia a good gay person is a dead gay person? How did there come to be a law in the Duma that forbids justifying homosexuality? Until now, the only thing you were forbidden to justify in my country was terrorism.... So as far as the deputies are concerned I am not a human being in the same sense that they are; I am to be classed as scum, like a terrorist. As far as the deputies are concerned I am scum by the fact of my birth, and it was criminal negligence not to have made a note of that in my birth certificate. What seemed like a bad dream only a couple of years ago has now become reality. And it is terrifying to imagine what could happen tomorrow.

Krasovsky spoke out in August 2013 against the boycott of the 2014 Winter Olympics in Russia that some gay rights activists proposed. He said: "If you want to boycott Olympic games in Russia, you're trying to boycott 7 million gay people in Russia. You want to boycott me." He is interviewed about his experiences in the 2014 documentary film Campaign of Hate: Russia and Gay Propaganda.

In July 2016, Krasovsky and the head of the outpatient department of the Moscow Regional AIDS Center Elena Orlova-Morozova established The Foundation in support of people who live with HIV — AIDS.Center.

In October 2017, he supported the nomination of Ksenia Sobchak as a candidate in the presidential election, and soon became a member of her campaign staff. On 1 March 2018, he left the staff following a conflict with Sobchak.

Since 2021 Krasovsky has presented a program on Russia Today called The Antonyms.

In October 2022, Krasovsky, who is openly gay, supported the approval of a law banning "LGBT propaganda" in Russia. Previously, in 2013, Krasovsky spoke out against such laws and urged gay people to fight for their rights.

=== 2022 Russian invasion of Ukraine ===
Krasovsky was a prominent supporter and pro-war commentator during the 2022 Russian invasion of Ukraine. Prior to the invasion, amid a rise in bellicose rhetoric in Russian state media, Krasovsky referred to Ukrainians as "animals", described Ukraine as "our Russian land", and warned that Russia would invade if Ukraine was close to joining NATO.

After the Vinnytsia missile strikes in July 2022, which killed 23 people, including 3 children, Krasovsky said that "Vinnytsia is not enough", and voiced his hope for a "final solution. A real, military one".

In August 2022, he said that "there should not be any Ukrainians at all" and therefore, that the Ukrainian language should be banned.

On 10 October 2022, in the aftermath of missile strikes across Ukraine which caused 14 deaths, Krasovsky shared a video of him dancing on a balcony in a cap with the letter Z, stating: "To say that I am happy is to say nothing at all. I'm just dancing on the balcony in Russian Army pajamas." In another post on Telegram, Krasovsky stated that the attack was "not enough".

==== Suspension from RT ====
In late October 2022, during a broadcast, Krasovsky said that Ukrainian children who had in the past criticised the Soviet Union as occupiers of Ukraine should have been thrown into river to make them drown there or been burned alive in their cottages. When Krasovsky said Ukraine "should not exist at all", his interviewee, novelist Sergei Lukyanenko, objected as this would mean incorporating many people who did not wish to live under Russian rule, to which Krasovsky said Russia should "shoot" these people. The comments sparked outrage both outside and inside Russia, and Ukrainian foreign minister Dmytro Kuleba called on countries to ban RT for what he described as incitement of genocide. RT's editor-in-chief, Margarita Simonyan, said that she had suspended Krasovsky over the "disgusting" comments.

That same day, Krasovsky apologized:

Look, I'm really embarrassed that I somehow didn't see that edge. About the children. Well, it happens like this: you're sitting on the air, you're going wild. And you can't stop. I apologize to everyone who was freaked out by that. I apologize to Margarita (Simonyan), to everyone for whom it seemed wild, unthinkable and irresistible. I hope you'll forgive me.

On the evening of the same day, Krasovsky recorded a four-minute video apology stating that "every baby's tear is my pain, my worst nightmare".

== Personal life ==
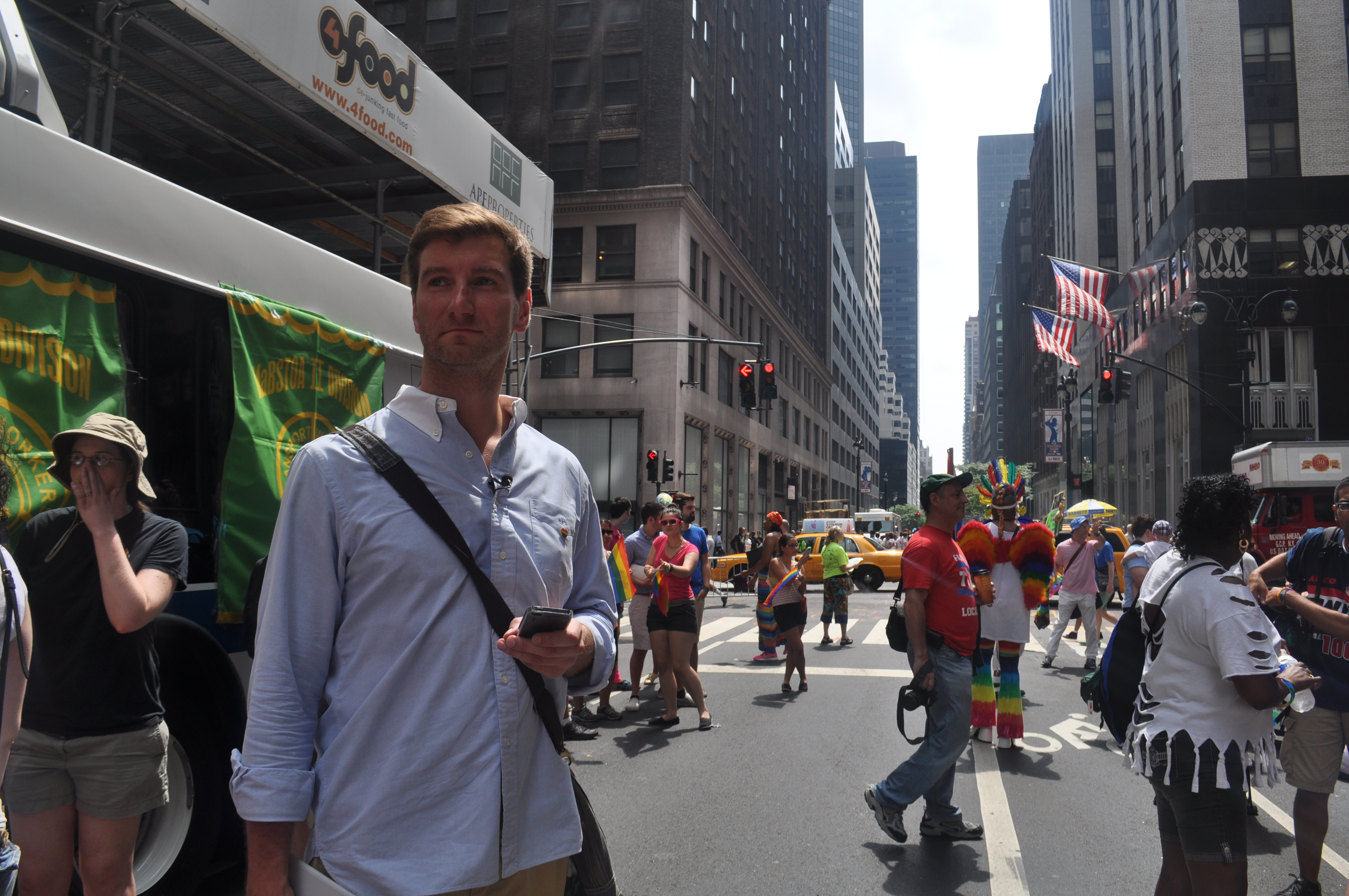
Krasovsky attending a pride parade in New York City, July 2013

On 25 January 2013 he came out as a gay man.

In December 2017, Krasovsky revealed that he has been HIV positive since 2011.

=== Sanctions ===
In late February, following the start of the 2022 Russian invasion of Ukraine, Krasovsky was sanctioned by the European Union; the government of the United Kingdom did the same as a result of the invasion.
