= Murder of Vladislav Tornovoy =

2013 homophobic murder in Russia

The murder of Vladislav Tornovoy happened in Krasnoarmeisky district of Volgograd in the night from 9 May to 10 May 2013 after celebration of Day of Victory. Three young men were torturing the young man and, at last, they killed him by smashing his head with a twenty-kilogram stone. All three perpetrators of the event – Alexey Burkov, Anton Smolin and Pavel Semikin – were arrested. According to recognition of one of them, the murder took part based on hatred to homosexuals. The closed trial of the accused started in December 2013.

== Murder ==
The body of 23-year-old Vladislav Tornovoy was found at around 7 am on 10 May 2013, with extensive injuries, including to his genitals, in the yard of a building on Rossiiskaya Street in the Krasnoarmeisky district of Volgograd. His head had been extensively damaged, and he had a beer bottle inserted into his anus. The killers also attempted, unsuccessfully, to burn the body. It was determined by the forensics investigators that he died at around 1 a.m.

After the victim was identified, his social circle was investigated leading to several potential suspects. These included: a 22-year-old friend of the victim, that went to the same school; and a 27-year-old acquaintance, who had been previously convicted for theft. Another young man was identified as an eyewitness to the slaying. Of the two suspects, only one of admitted to the crime.

The three identified people who either participated or witnessed the slaying were Vladislav Tornovoy's closest friends, and had visited his house on many separate occasions. Of the three men, one had a previous jail sentence, and another had been placed on probation for separate crimes. The investigation showed that each of the detained men had committed homophobic crimes before.

== Investigation and trial ==
=== Investigator’s comments ===
According to investigator Badma Gilyandikov's version, the reason for the murder was personal dislike. A senior investigator of District Investigative Division SC in the region, Andrey Gapchenko said, that the motive for committing the crime was discovery of the homosexuality of the killed man. However, Gapchenko pointed that this information had not been checked and it would never be checked. During an interview with RIA Novosti Gapchenko said, that according to words of one suspect, Tornovoy came out to his friends while drinking alcohol, and as a joke other guys wanted to undress him to send him home without clothes, but the joke went too far. At the same time Gapchenko said that the investigation considered other reasons for the murder, but they could not be disclosed due to the ongoing investigation.

=== Trial ===
The trial started in December 2013 and it took place behind closed doors in the Volgograd Regional Court. The press secretary of the Volgograd Regional Court, Vladimir Shevchenko, said that the court session is closed because of "discussion of private life of the victim". The court session decided to send the three suspects to the Serbsky Center in Moscow for psychiatric examinations. Sessions will continue after examinations proceed. The Tornovoy family ignored the court session, and lawyers refused to comment.
