= Emtricitabine/rilpivirine/tenofovir =

Combination drug for HIV

Combination of
- Emtricitabine: Nucleoside analog reverse-transcriptase inhibitor
- Rilpivirine: Non-nucleoside reverse transcriptase inhibitor
- Tenofovir disoproxil: Nucleotide analog reverse-transcriptase inhibitor

Clinical data
- Trade names: Complera, Eviplera
- AHFS/Drugs.com: Multum Consumer Information
- MedlinePlus: a616021
- License data: US DailyMed: Emtricitabine, rilpivirine hydrochloride, tenofovir disoproxil
- Pregnancy category: AU: B3
- Routes of administration: By mouth
- ATC code: J05AR08 (WHO)

Legal status
- Legal status: AU: S4 (Prescription only); US: ℞-only; EU: Rx-only; In general: ℞ (Prescription only)

Identifiers
- CAS Number: 1436864-99-1
- ChemSpider: none
- KEGG: D10571

Emtricitabine/rilpivirine/tenofovir (FTC/RPV/TDF), sold under the brand name Complera among others, is a fixed-dose combination of antiretroviral drugs for the treatment of HIV/AIDS. The drug was co-developed by Gilead Sciences and Johnson & Johnson's Tibotec division and was approved by the US Food and Drug Administration (FDA) in August 2011, and by the European Medicines Agency in November 2011, for patients who have not previously been treated for HIV. It is available as a once-a-day single tablet.

In the European Union it is marketed as Eviplera and in the US as Complera.

== Medical uses ==
Emtricitabine/rilpivirine/tenofovir is indicated for treatment of HIV-1 in adults naïve to HIV-1 medications (where the virus has not developed resistance to these anti-HIV medications) and who have no more than 100,000 copies per mL of HIV-1 RNA in their blood (“viral load”).

== Side effects ==
Common

- Diarrhea
- Nausea
- Vomiting
- Insomnia
- Abnormal dreams
- Dizziness
- Headache
- Rash
- Weakness
- Decreased appetite

Serious

- Lactic acidosis (excess lactic acid in blood) is a rare and potentially fatal side effect. It is characterized by the following symptoms: deep and rapid breathing, tiredness or weakness, nausea, vomiting, abnormal muscle pain, dizziness or drowsiness
- Serious liver problems, such as hepatomegaly (enlarged liver) and steatosis (fatty liver). Presentation typically includes: skin or the white part of the eyes turning yellow (jaundice), dark “tea-colored” urine, light-colored bowel movements, loss of appetite, nausea, stomach pain
- Worsening of hepatitis B (HBV) infection. Patients also diagnosed with HBV who stop taking Emtricitabine/rilpivirine/tenofovir may suddenly exacerbate their hepatitis.
- New or worsening kidney problems, including kidney failure
- Onset of depressive disorders or mood changes
- Changes in bone such as osteonecrosis (breakdown and death of bone)
- Increases or redistribution of body fat
- Immune system changes (e.g. Immune Reconstitution Syndrome)

== Interactions ==
Contraindications

Use of emtricitabine/rilpivirine/tenofovir with the following medicines is contraindicated, as they lead to reduced blood levels of rilpivirine and in turn reduce the effectiveness of emtricitabine/rilpivirine/tenofovir:

- carbamazepine, oxcarbazepine, phenobarbital, phenytoin
- rifampicin, rifapentine
- omeprazole, esomeprazole, lansoprazole, pantoprazole, rabeprazole
- systemic dexamethasone (more than a single dose)
- St John's wort
