= AIDS.Center =

Russian non-profit organization

- Formation: July 2016; 9 years ago
- Founder: Anton Krasovsky, Elena Orlova-Morozova
- Type: nonprofit organization
- Headquarters: Moscow, Russia
- Website: spid.center

The AIDS.Center Foundation (Russian: Фонд «СПИД.Центр», full name: the Foundation in support of people who live with HIV "AIDS.Center Foundation") is a non-profit organization established by a Russian journalist and TV presenter Anton Krasovsky and the head of the outpatient and outpatient department of the Moscow Regional AIDS Center Elena Orlova-Morozova to help people living with HIV and to fight discrimination.

== History ==
In 2014, the journalist Anton Krasovsky took part in the launch of the Moscow regional center campaign for prevention and control of AIDS and infectious diseases New Generation Without HIV, in which people were urged to get tested for HIV. TV presenters Andrey Malakhov and Oksana Pushkina, actresses Elizaveta Boyarskaya, Daria Melnikova, Polina Kutepova, Yuliya Snigir, Alisa Khazanova, actors Artur Smolyaninov, Anatoly Bely, and singer Dmitry Bikbaev took part in the campaign.

In February 2015, the site spid.center was launched. Initially, it was to draw attention to the problems of the patients of the Moscow region AIDS Center, but later it became an independent awareness raising project on the HIV problem, aimed for a wide audience.

The public educational campaign Don’t be afraid, we are with you, aiming to support people living with HIV, was launched in November 2015. It was promoted by the family of the singer and former member of the group Chay Vdvoyom Stanislav Kostyushkin. It was followed by the Do not be afraid project, which was launched on March 1, 2016, by AIDS.Center and the TV channel Dozhd.

The Foundation in support of people who live with HIV AIDS.Center Foundation was established in July 2016 by Anton Krasovsky and the head of the outpatient department of the Moscow Regional AIDS Center Elena Orlova-Morozova. The Foundation's mission is to help HIV-positive people and inform the public about HIV and AIDS. In September of the same year, AIDS.Center won the award "Made in Russia – 2016" of Snob project in the nomination Social Project.

The collaboration between AIDS.Center and TV channel Dozhd continued in September 2016 in the My HIV-Story project – a series of videos in which HIV-positive people talked about the experience of accepting their diagnosis. On December 1, 2016, the Moscow Regional AIDS Center launched an advertising campaign Do not be afraid to talk and to live, telling about the lives of people with HIV status. Videos for TV were created with the support of AIDS.Center.

The fund opened an office in ArtPlay space on Nizhnyaya Syromyatnicheskaya Street, 11, in February 2017. The office is also used as a public space and a venue for lectures, seminars on legal issues, discussion meetings, support groups and various events. For example, in 2017, a photo exhibition the Brave and a week of fast testing for HIV, coincided with the World AIDS Day, celebrated on December 1.

In December 2017, Anton Krasovsky, in an interview with Zag, told that he has lived with HIV since 2011.

== Board of directors ==
The Board of Directors of the Foundation includes four people:

- Anton Krasovsky, Head of the foundation directors board;
- Elena Orlova-Morozova, medical director of the foundation, Head of the outpatient department of the Moscow Regional AIDS Center;
- Sergey Abdurakhmanov, Director of the foundation;
- Anton Eremin, Director of regional development, Infectious diseases physician at Moscow Regional AIDS Center.

== Board of trustees ==
The Board of Trustees of the Foundation includes six people:

- Alexander Pronin, Chief Physician of the Moscow region AIDS Center, Candidate of Medical Sciences;
- Oksana Pushkina, journalist, deputy of the 7th State Duma, deputy chairman of the committee on family, women and children;
- Konstantin Dobrynin, State Secretary of the Federal Chamber of Lawyers, Senior Partner of the Pen&Paper law firm;
- Pavel Lobkov, journalist, presenter of the programs on the Dozhd TV channel, Candidate of Biological Sciences;
- Grigory Kaminsky, Doctor of Medical Sciences;
- Evgenia Zhukova, Head of the Epidemiology Department at Moscow Regional AIDS Center.
