= Disinformation in the Russo-Ukrainian war =

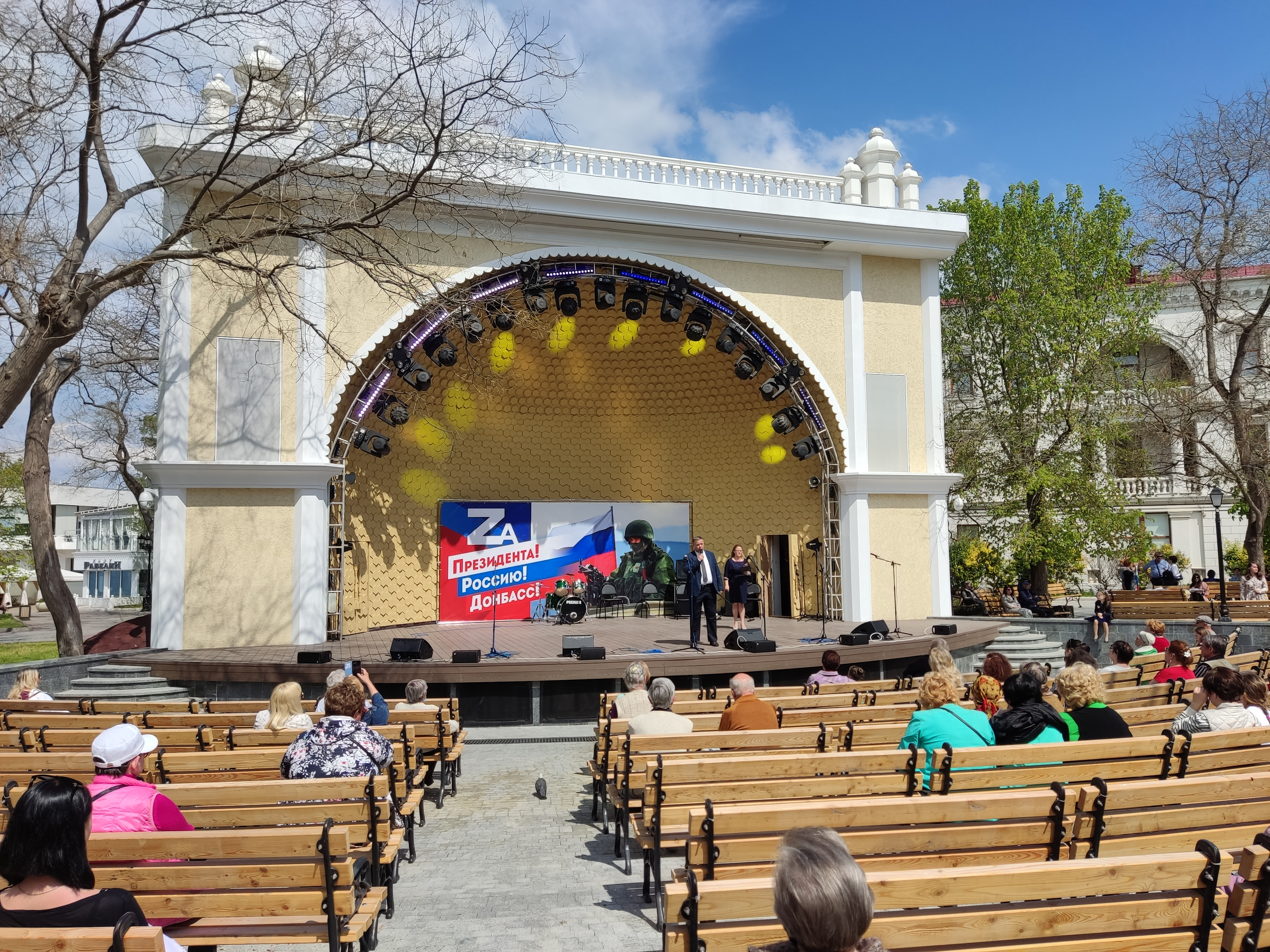
A Russian propaganda rally in Sevastopol (Russian-occupied Crimea, Ukraine) in April 2022, portraying the Russian invasion of Ukraine as a defence of the Donbas. The slogan reads: "For the President! For Russia! For Donbas!"

As part of the Russian invasion of Ukraine, the Russian state and state-controlled media have spread disinformation in their information war against Ukraine. This disinformation has also been spread and promoted by so-called Russian web brigades, using fake profiles on social media. The Ukrainian state and media have used propaganda and deception as well, although their efforts have been more limited than the Russian disinformation campaign.

Russian propaganda and fake news stories have attacked Ukraine's nationhood and accused it of being a neo-Nazi state, of committing genocide against Russian speakers, of developing nuclear and biological weapons, and of being influenced by Satanism. Russian propaganda falsely accuses NATO of controlling Ukraine and of threatening and provoking Russia. These claims have been widely rejected as untrue and crafted to justify the invasion and even to justify genocidal acts against Ukrainians. The Russian state has denied carrying out war crimes in Ukraine; Russian media and internet activists give false alibis for Russian forces, or falsely blame attacks on Ukrainian forces instead. Some of the disinformation seeks to undermine international support for Ukraine and to provoke hostility against Ukrainian refugees.

Russian disinformation has been pervasive and successful in Russia itself, due to censorship of war news and state control of most media. In the Western world, the far-right and far-left have been most accepting of Russian narratives, and Russia has collaborated with both far-right and far-left groups to spread disinformation. Ukraine's government said that Russian disinformation had influenced some in the US Trump administration. Because of its disinformation campaign and attempts to stoke division and unrest, Russian media has been restricted and its reputation has been tarnished in many European and developed countries. Russia has been more successful spreading disinformation in the Global South, particularly in the Sahel region of Africa, where Russia uses private military companies to support local regimes (see Wagner Group activities in Africa).

== Russian themes ==
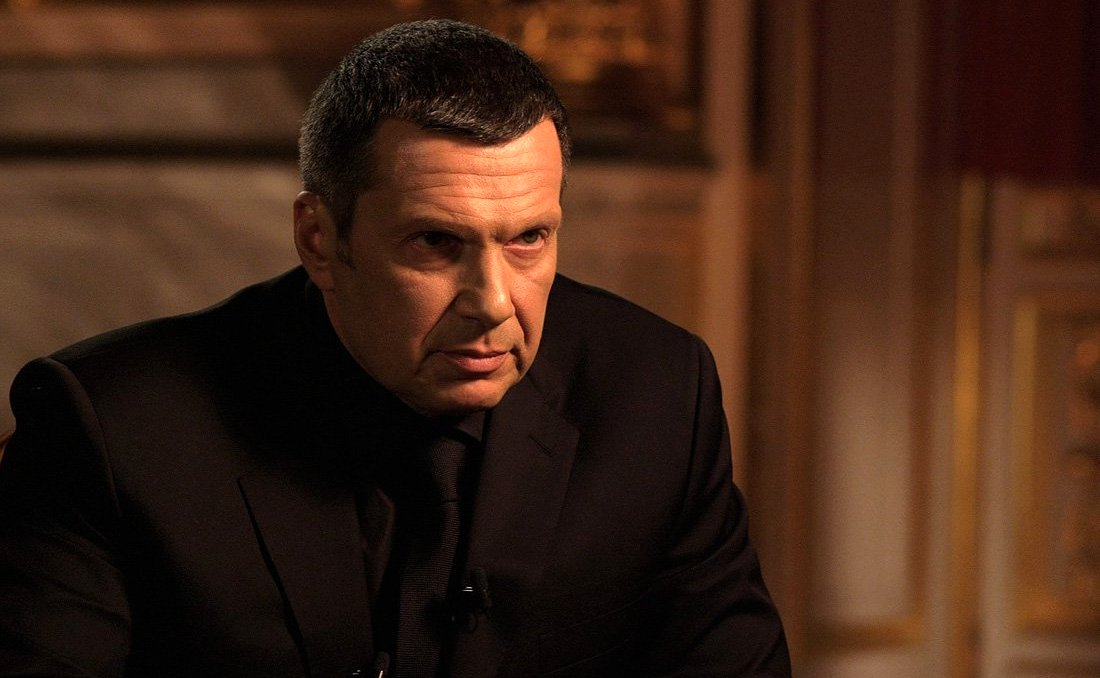
Russian presenter Vladimir Solovyov has broadcast disinformation and propaganda supporting the invasion of Ukraine.

Disinformation (a lie or exaggeration meant to sway opinion) has been spread by the Russian state, state-controlled media, propagandists, and Russian web brigades using fake profiles on social media. The aim is to justify Russia's war against Ukraine, and undermine those who oppose it. Russia seeks to sow disunity among Western countries who back Ukraine; to undermine support for Ukraine among the public; to convince them that sanctions are not working; and to cover-up or create plausible deniability for Russian war crimes. Russia tailors its propaganda to its target audience, appealing to far-right, far-left, and anti-Western sentiments.

The following are common themes in Russian propaganda and disinformation, as well as some of the common rebuttals.

=== Denying Ukrainian nationhood and statehood ===
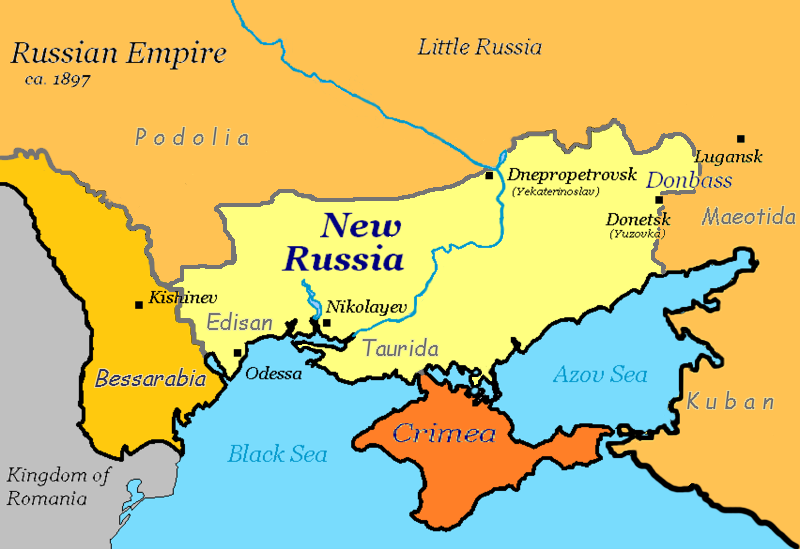
Vladimir Putin denied the legitimacy of the Ukrainian state and revived Russian imperialist ideas such as Novorossiya (New Russia).

Russian propaganda has attacked Ukrainian nationhood and national identity, portraying Ukrainians as "Little Russians" or "part of an all-Russian nation". This has been a theme in Russian imperialist and nationalist rhetoric since the seventeenth century. Russian president Vladimir Putin has long questioned the Ukrainian people's identity and the country's legitimacy. In his 2021 essay "On the Historical Unity of Russians and Ukrainians", Putin called Russians and Ukrainians "one people" and claimed there is "no historical basis" for the "idea of Ukrainian people as a nation separate from the Russians". Since then, Russia's official and media narrative is that Ukraine has always been Russian. In announcing the invasion, Putin repeatedly denied Ukraine's right to exist, claiming that it was created by the Russian Bolsheviks and that it never had "real statehood". In June 2025, Putin declared that "all of Ukraine is ours" because he considers Russians and Ukrainians to be "one people".

Björn Alexander Düben, professor of international affairs, writes that "Putin's historical claims do not hold up to serious academic scrutiny" and that he is "embracing a neo-imperialist account that exalts Russia's centuries-long repressive rule over Ukraine, while simultaneously presenting Russia as a victim of 'US imperialism'".

Dmitry Medvedev, deputy chairman of the Security Council of Russia and former Russian president, has called Ukraine part of Russia. He wrote that "Ukraine is NOT a country, but artificially collected territories" and that Ukrainian "is NOT a language" but a "mongrel dialect" of Russian. He has said that Ukraine should not exist in any form and that Russia will continue to wage war against any independent Ukrainian state.

Such denial of nationhood is said to be part of a campaign of incitement to genocide by Russian authorities. United Nations special rapporteurs have condemned the Russian occupation authorities for attempting "to erase local [Ukrainian] culture, history, and language" and to forcibly replace them with Russian language and culture.

After the 2014 Revolution of Dignity, Russian rhetoric portrayed Ukrainian governments as illegitimate, calling them the "Kyiv regime" or "junta". Putin said they were "led by a band of drug addicts and neo-Nazis", and claimed Ukraine is "under external control" by the West or the United States.

The official governmental website of Ukraine says that Ukrainians consider themselves an independent nation. A poll conducted in April 2022 by "Rating" found that the vast majority (91%) of Ukrainians (excluding the Russian-occupied territories) do not support the thesis that "Russians and Ukrainians are one people".

Russia has falsely asserted several times that foreign corporations, banks and investment funds—like BlackRock or Vanguard—control a large portion of Ukrainian soil and forbid the burial of Ukrainian bodies on that land. However, under Ukrainian law, foreign market agents like corporations and individuals are not allowed to own Ukrainian agricultural land.

=== Allegations of Nazism ===
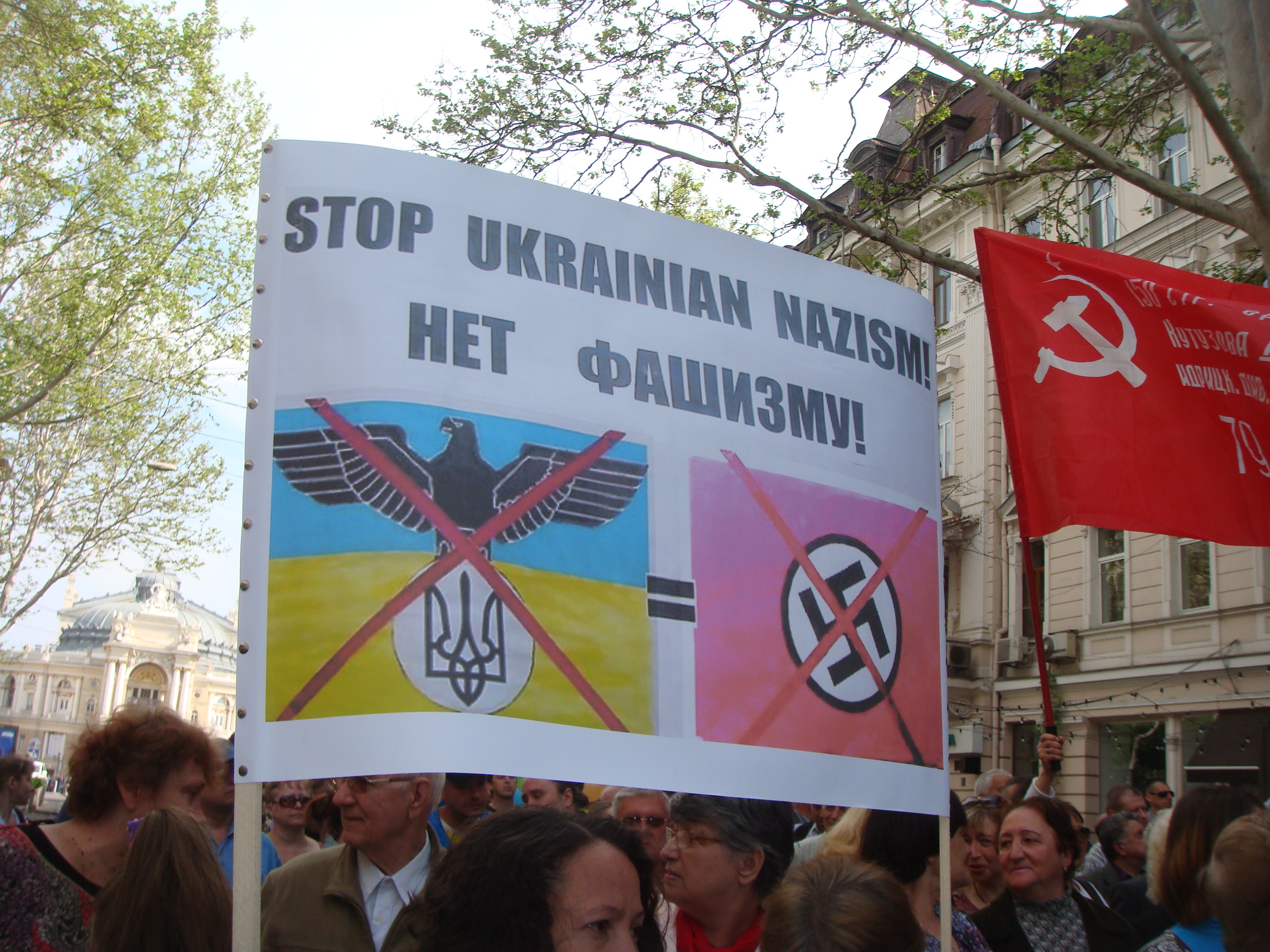
Pro-Russian activists with a sign likening the Ukrainian government to the Nazis, and waving a Victory Banner

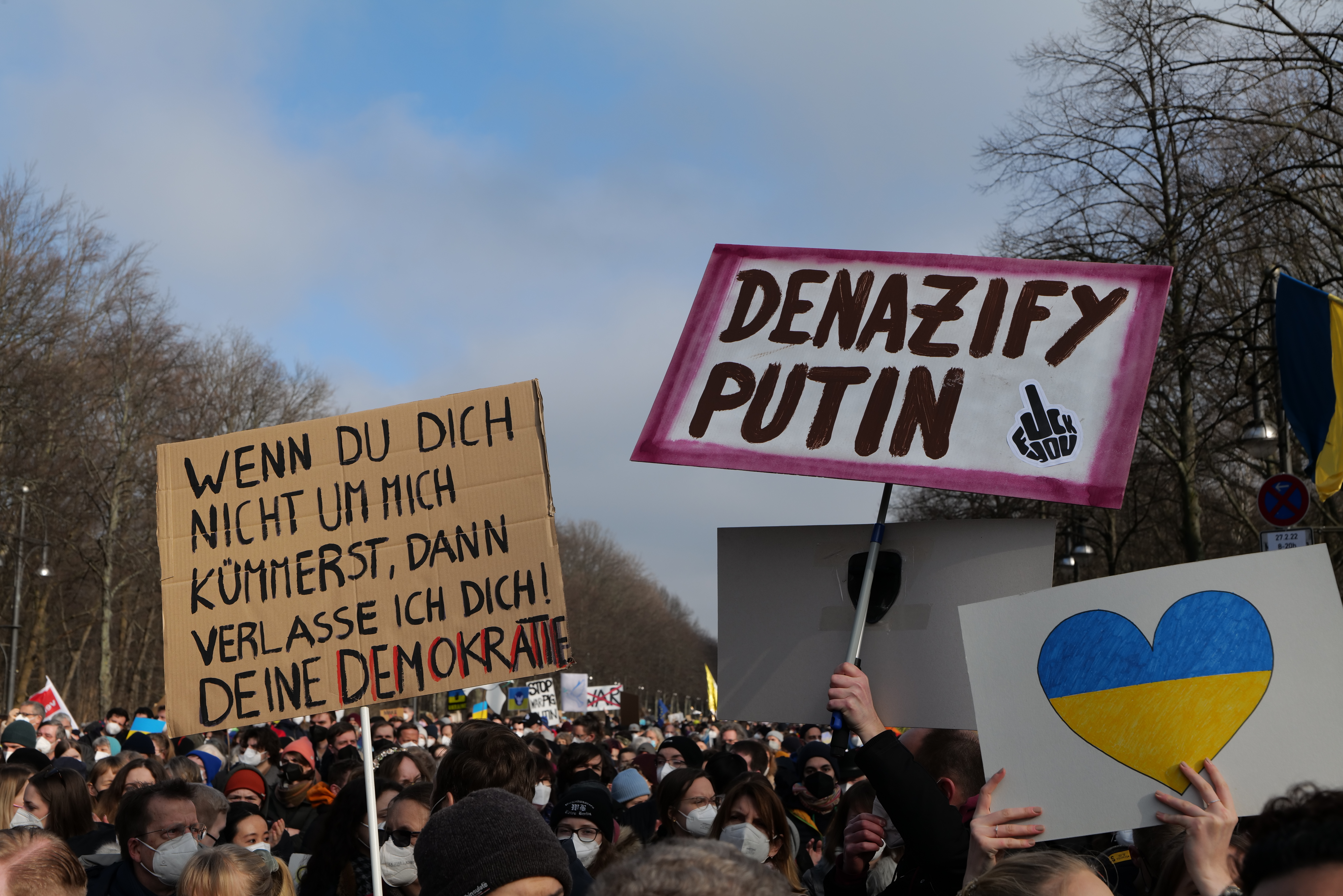
A sign saying "Denazify Putin" at a Ukraine solidarity protest

Putin falsely claimed that the Ukrainian government were neo-Nazis and announced that one of his goals was the "de-Nazification of Ukraine". Putin's claims were repeated by Russian foreign minister Sergey Lavrov in a speech to the UN Human Rights Council; many diplomats walked out in protest. These claims were repeated in Russian media to justify the war. In April 2022, Russian state-owned news agency RIA Novosti published an article by Timofey Sergeytsev, "What Russia should do with Ukraine", where he argued that Ukraine and Ukrainian national identity must be wiped out, because he claimed most Ukrainians are at least "passive Nazis". By May, references to de-Nazifying Ukraine in Russian media began to wane, reportedly because it had not gained traction with the Russian public.

These allegations of Nazism are widely rejected as untrue and part of a Russian disinformation campaign to justify the invasion, with many pointing out that Ukrainian president Volodymyr Zelenskyy is Jewish and had relatives who were victims of the Holocaust. Some of the world's leading historians of Nazism and the Holocaust put out a statement rejecting Putin's claims, which was signed by hundreds of other historians and scholars of the subject. It says:

"We strongly reject the Russian government's ... equation of the Ukrainian state with the Nazi regime to justify its unprovoked aggression. This rhetoric is factually wrong, morally repugnant and deeply offensive to the memory of millions of victims of Nazism and those who courageously fought against it."

The authors say that Ukraine "has right-wing extremists and violent xenophobic groups" like any country, but "none of this justifies the Russian aggression and the gross mischaracterization of Ukraine". The Auschwitz-Birkenau State Museum denounced Putin's claims, saying "once again, innocent people are being killed purely because of insane pseudo-imperial megalomania". The US Holocaust Memorial Museum and Yad Vashem condemned Putin's abuse of Holocaust history. Ukrainian Jews likewise rejected claims of Ukraine being a neo-Nazi state.

Kremlin claims of Nazism against Ukraine are partly an attempt to drum-up support for the war among its citizens. Russian propaganda has framed it as a continuation of the Soviet Union's "Great Patriotic War" against Nazi Germany, even though Russia supports far-right groups across Europe. In the words of Miriam Berger for The Washington Post, "the rhetoric of the 'fight against fascism' resonates deeply in Russia, which suffered huge losses in the fight against Nazi Germany". Some Soviet imagery was used as part of this propaganda drive, and Ukrainian flags were replaced with Victory Banners in some occupied towns.

Experts on disinformation say that Russia's portrayal of Ukrainians as Nazis helps them justify Russian war crimes; Russia's UN representative justified the Hroza missile attack in this way. Historian Timothy Snyder said the Russian regime calls Ukrainians "Nazis" to justify genocidal acts against them. He said pro-war Russians use "Nazi" to mean "a Ukrainian who refuses to be Russian". Russian neo-fascist Aleksandr Dugin proposed to simply "identify Ukrainian Nazism with Russophobia". Dugin argued that Russia should be the only country allowed to define Ukrainian Nazism and Russophobia, in the same way that Jews have what he calls a "monopoly" on the definition of antisemitism.

Article 16 of the Constitution of Ukraine states: "To ensure ecological safety and to maintain the ecological balance on the territory of Ukraine, to overcome the consequences of the Chernobyl catastrophe - a catastrophe of global scale, and to preserve the gene pool of the Ukrainian people, is the duty of the State". A number of pro-Russian online accounts have used this sentence to claim it proved Ukrainians are "fascists" and "Nazis". In reality, this article of the Constitution only affirms the protection for people who faced adverse health and ecological impacts of the Chernobyl nuclear disaster. Article 24 of the Constitution states that "There shall be no privileges or restrictions based on race, colour of skin, political, religious and other beliefs, sex, ethnic and social origin, property status, place of residence, linguistic or other characteristics". Ukraine has publicly condemned "all forms of Nazism, neo-Nazism, racism, racial discrimination, xenophobia, and related intolerance."

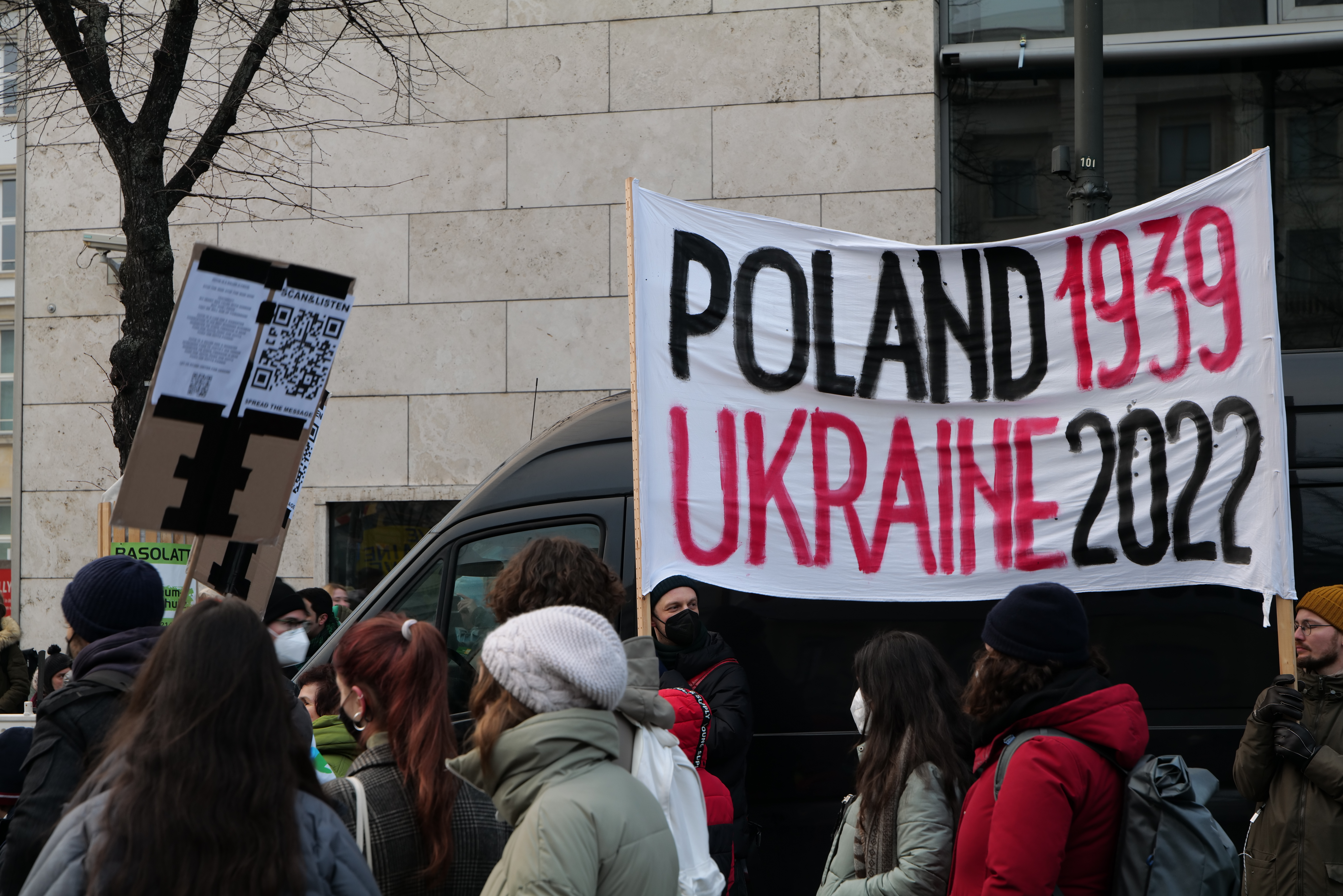
A banner likening Russia's invasion of Ukraine to the Nazi and Soviet Invasion of Poland

Ukrainian officials respond that Russia's own actions in Ukraine are like those of Nazi Germany, and some commentators, including Snyder, have likened Putin's Russia to a fascist state (see Ruscism). Many Russian units who took part in the invasion are linked to neo-Nazism themselves, including the Rusich Group and Kremlin-sponsored Wagner Group. Other openly neo-Nazi groups have been involved in recruiting, training and fighting on the Russian side, such as the Russian Imperial Legion, AAST and Atomwaffen Division Russland. Russian far-right groups also played a major role among the Russian proxy forces in Donbas.

Like many countries, Ukraine has a far-right fringe, such as Right Sector and Svoboda. Analysts generally agree that the Russian government greatly exaggerates far-right influence in Ukraine, as there is no widespread support for far-right ideology in the government, military, or electorate. In the 2019 Ukrainian parliamentary election, a coalition of far-right parties including Right Sector received only 2% of votes and did not win any seats. Ukraine's Azov Brigade began as a far-right volunteer militia. It was a focus of Kremlin propaganda, which falsely claimed they were "anti-Russian neo-Nazis persecuting ethnic Russians". Azov has been mentioned on Russian TV more often than Putin's ruling United Russia party. By the time of the invasion, the brigade had been largely de-politicized. A 2022 Counter Extremism Project report concluded that the Azov Brigade can no longer be defined as neo-Nazi.

=== Donbas genocide allegation ===
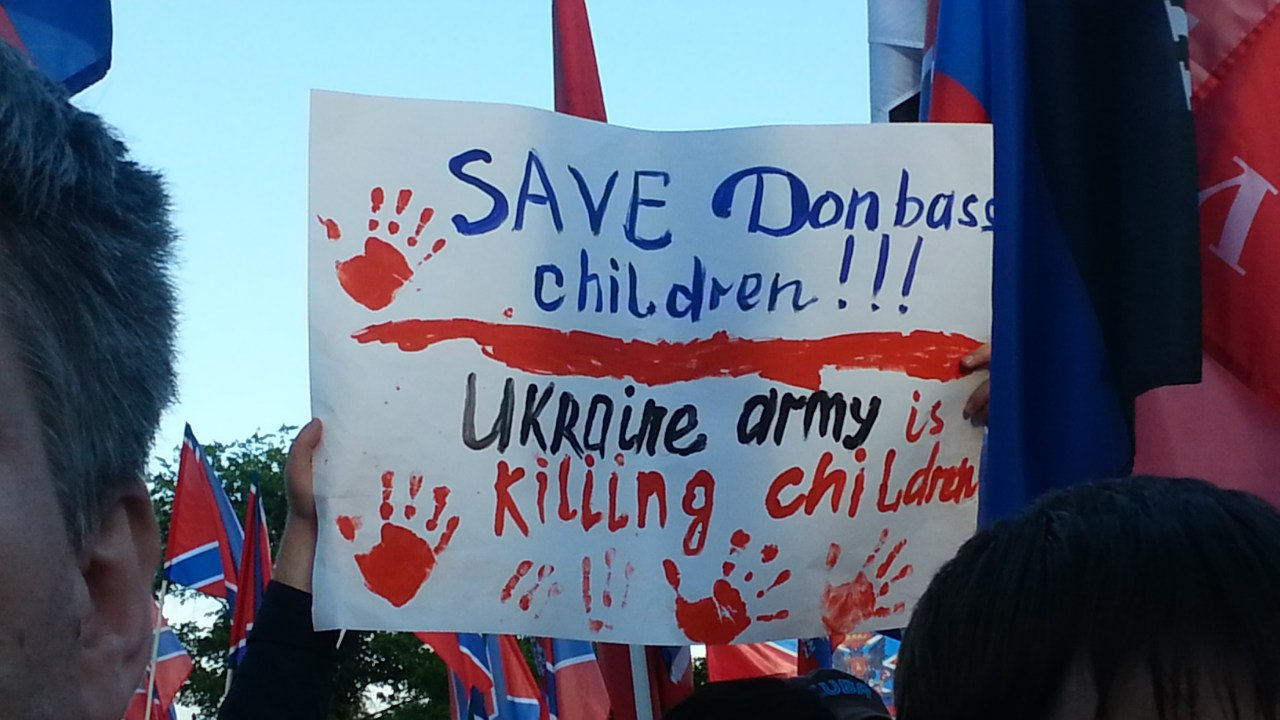
A rally in support of Novorossiya in Moscow on 11 June 2014

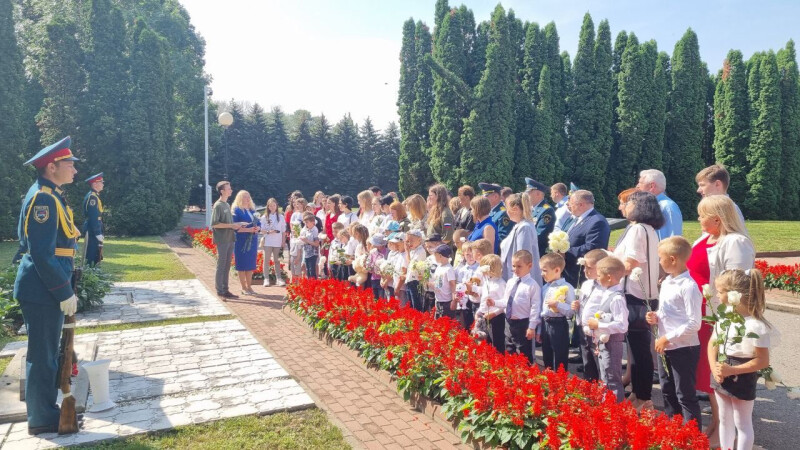
Russian children at a memorial to children allegedly killed by Ukrainian forces in Donbas, a state-sponsored event in Kursk in July 2023

In his announcement of the invasion, Putin baselessly claimed that Ukraine was carrying out genocide against Russian Ukrainians in the Donbas region. He said the purpose of Russia's "military operation" was to "protect the people" of the Russian-controlled breakaway republics of Donetsk and Luhansk. Putin claimed they had been facing "genocide perpetrated by the Kyiv regime" for eight years. There is no evidence for Putin's claims of genocide, and they have been widely rejected as a pretext for invasion. The European Commission called the allegations "Russian disinformation". Over 300 scholars on genocide issued a statement rejecting Russia's abuse of the term "genocide" to "justify its own violence". Ukraine brought a case before the International Court of Justice (ICJ) to challenge Russia's claim. The ICJ said it had not seen any evidence of genocide by Ukraine.

A claim by pro-Kremlin commentators is that "Ukraine killed 14,000 ethnic Russian civilians" in the Donbas. However, this is the total number of people killed by all sides in the Donbas War as a whole. According to the Office of the United Nations High Commissioner for Human Rights, about 14,300 people were killed in the Donbas War, both soldiers and civilians. Of these, 6,500 were Russian proxy forces, 4,400 were Ukrainian forces, and 3,404 were civilians on both sides of the frontline. The vast majority of civilian deaths were in the first year, and the death rate in the Donbas War was actually falling before the 2022 Russian invasion: in 2019 there were 27 conflict-related civilian deaths, in 2020 there were 26 deaths, and in 2021 there were 25 deaths, over half of them from mines and unexploded ordnance.

By comparison, after Russia's full-scale invasion, 4,163 civilians were killed in March 2022, meaning that more civilians died in that one month alone than in the entire eight years of the Donbas War. Since the invasion, Russian state-controlled media and pro-Kremlin Telegram channels falsely accused Ukrainian troops of attacking civilian targets in Mariupol and bombing Ukrainian cities. According to Russian website Bumaga, an anonymous former employee of Yevgeny Prigozhin's media company "Patriot" said that most of their reports about "victims of Ukrainian Armed Forces" in Donbas were staged.

A snippet of a speech by former Ukrainian president Petro Poroshenko was taken out of context to support claims that Ukraine was abusing civilians in the Donbas. Poroshenko appeared to claim that he will force children in the Donbas to sleep in cellars and that he will prevent Donbas residents from accessing public services. In his full speech, Poroshenko does not claim that Ukraine will mistreat Donbas residents, but rather that the occupation of Donbas by pro-Russian separatists is causing suffering for local residents. Therefore, by comparing their appalling living conditions with those of Ukrainian citizens, he argues that Ukraine could win the war in Donbas simply due to popular discontent on the other side.

=== Allegations of NATO provocation ===
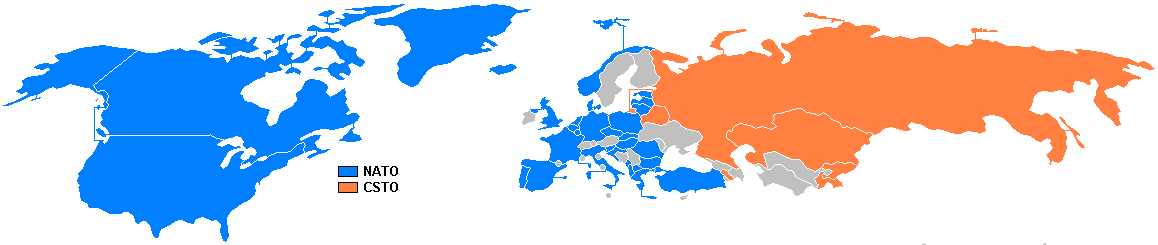
Map of NATO (blue) and the CSTO (orange) at the start of the full-scale invasion in 2022

Russian propaganda often claims that NATO and its "eastward expansion" provoked the invasion and that Russia had to invade Ukraine in self-defense. In his two speeches just before the invasion, Putin said that Ukraine joining NATO would be a threat, and warned that NATO might use Ukraine to launch a surprise attack on Russia. He falsely claimed that NATO forces and military infrastructure were being built up in Ukraine, that the NATO "war machine" was moving toward Russia's borders, and that the Ukrainian military was under NATO control. Russian state media falsely claimed that thousands of NATO soldiers had been killed in the invasion.

NATO is a collective security alliance, similar to the Russian-led CSTO. The Russian Federation has bordered NATO since the 1990s. In 1999, Russia signed the Charter for European Security, affirming the right of each state to choose its security arrangements and to join alliances if they wish. Ukraine is not a member of NATO. When Russia occupied Crimea and invaded the Donbas in 2014, Ukraine was officially a neutral country and was not seeking NATO membership. In December 2014, Ukraine's parliament voted to end this neutral status in response to Russia's aggression, and Ukraine only applied to join NATO in response to the 2022 invasion. Steven Pifer thus argues that Russia's own aggressive actions have done the most to push Ukraine towards NATO. When Russia invaded in 2022, Ukraine was a long way from membership. Members of the alliance have been wary of letting Ukraine join, partly due to Putin's warnings.

Putin claimed that NATO broke a promise not to let any Eastern European countries join. This unwritten promise was allegedly made by American and German diplomats to Soviet leader Mikhail Gorbachev in 1990, but the diplomats and NATO denied ever making any formal proposal. Such a promise was never included in any treaty, and the Soviet Union ceased to exist in 1991. From then until the Russian invasion, 14 Eastern European countries willingly joined NATO. Political scientist Filip Kostelka says many of these countries sought NATO membership "to protect themselves from the Russian threat. They did not need to be pushed". The last time a country bordering Russia had joined NATO prior to the invasion was in 2004.

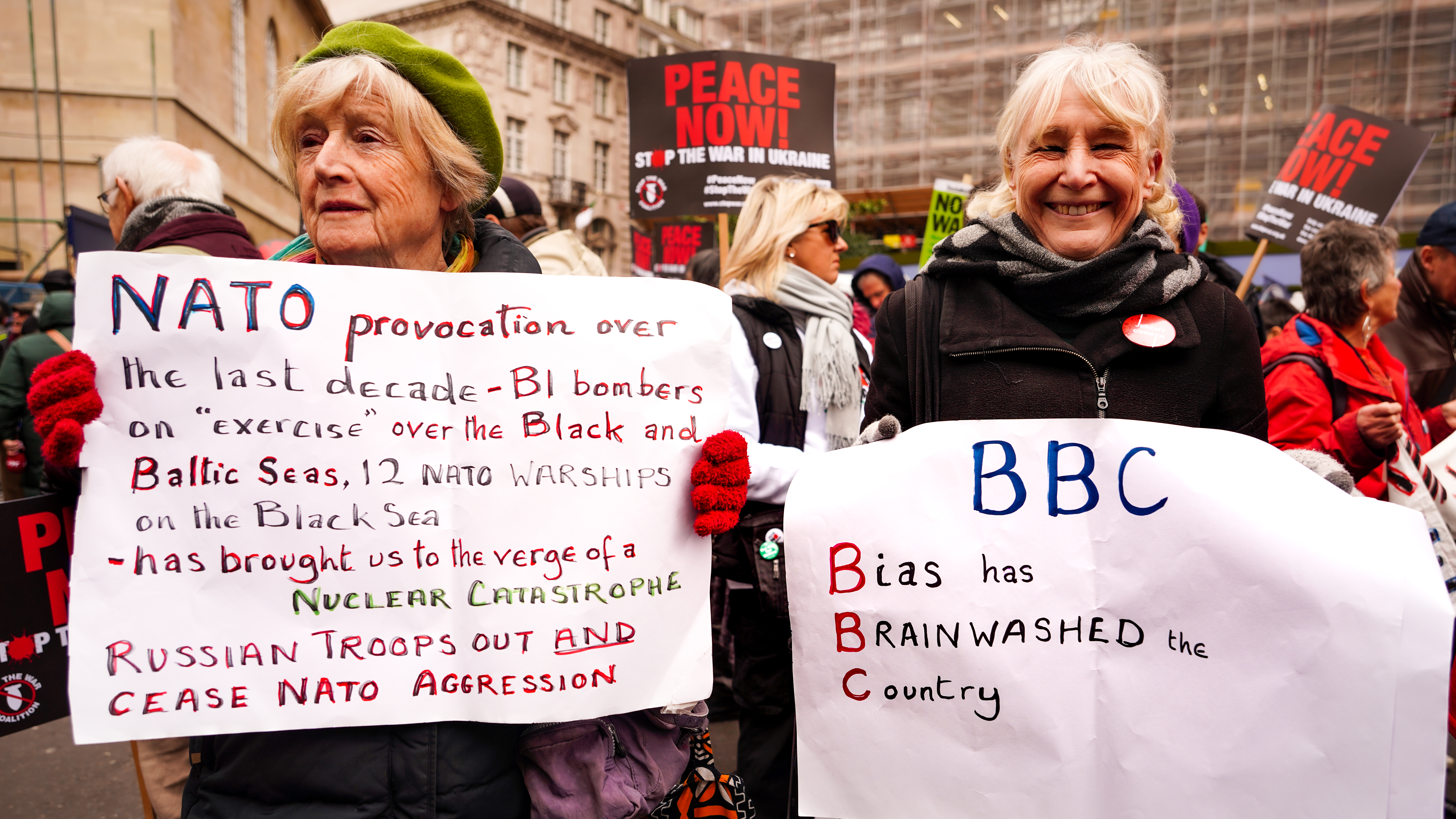
Protesters in London accusing NATO of provocation and aggression against Russia (2023)

Peter Dickinson of the Atlantic Council suggested the real reason Putin opposes NATO is not because he believes it is a threat, but because it "prevents him from bullying Russia's neighbors". Tom Casier writes that Russia's annexation of southeastern Ukraine reveals that the real motive for the invasion is to create a "Greater Russia".

Shortly before his death in a plane crash, Russian oligarch Yevgeny Prigozhin accused the Russian military leadership of lying about NATO aggression to justify the invasion. Prigozhin was a close ally of Putin and his Wagner Group played an important role in the invasion.

An article published by the Institute for the Study of War concluded:

Putin didn't invade Ukraine in 2022 because he feared NATO. He invaded because he believed that NATO was weak, that his efforts to regain control of Ukraine by other means had failed, and that installing a pro-Russian government in Kyiv would be safe and easy. His aim was not to defend Russia against some non-existent threat but rather to expand Russia's power, eradicate Ukraine's statehood, and destroy NATO, goals he still pursues.

=== NATO proxy war allegation ===
The Russian government has accused NATO of waging a "proxy war" against Russia, because its members have sent military aid to Ukraine after the beginning of the invasion. Russian state media falsely claimed that some Ukrainian military units fighting the invasion were under NATO command. NATO says it is not at war with Russia, but supports Ukraine's "right to self-defense, as enshrined in the UN Charter". Lawrence Freedman wrote that calling Ukraine a NATO "proxy" wrongly implied that "Ukrainians are only fighting because NATO put them up to it, rather than because of the more obvious reason that they have been subjected to a vicious invasion". He said that any weakening of Russia caused by the war would result from "Moscow's folly ...not NATO's intent". Geraint Hughes said that calling Ukraine NATO's "proxy" insults and belittles Ukrainians, denies their autonomy and implies they do not really have the will to defend their country.

Countering claims of NATO waging a proxy war, it is pointed out that NATO states have actually been slow in sending weaponry to Ukraine, especially advanced weapons, and they prevented Ukraine from firing those weapons into Russia. NATO refused to enforce a no-fly zone over Ukraine, and the US told Ukraine to stop attacking refineries and early-warning radars in Russia.

=== Alleged assassination and sabotage attempts ===
On 18 February 2022, the Luhansk People's Republic showed a video purportedly showing removal of a car full of explosives prepared to blow up a train full of women and children evacuating to Russia. The video's metadata showed that it had been recorded on 12 June 2019.

The breakaway Donetsk People's Republic also released a video on 18 February 2022 that claimed to show Poles trying to blow up a chlorine tank. The video was further distributed by Russian media. The video's metadata showed that it was created on 8 February 2022, and included different pieces of audio or video, including a 2010 YouTube video from a military firing range in Finland. Ukrainian intelligence attributed responsibility for the video to the Russian intelligence service GRU.

According to Bellingcat, a supposed bombing of a "separatist police chief" by a "Ukrainian spy", broadcast on Russian state television, showed visual evidence of the bombing of an old "green army vehicle". The old car's registration plate was that of the separatist police chief, but the same licence plate was also seen on a different, new SUV.

On 22 February 2022, the Russian people's militias in Ukraine accused Ukraine of a "terrorist attack" that killed three civilians in a car on the Donetsk-Gorlovka highway. France 24 described the incident as a false flag attempt with corpses likely coming from a morgue to set up the scene.

=== Ukrainian biological and radiological weapons ===
==== Biological weapons labs ====
In March 2022, Russia alleged that Ukraine was developing biological weapons in a network of labs linked to the US. The Ministry of Foreign Affairs of the People's Republic of China and Chinese state media amplified Russian claims. QAnon promoters also echo disinformation. BBC Reality Check found no evidence supporting the claims. The United Nations and the Bulletin of the Atomic Scientists also refuted this. Russian biologists in and outside of Russia have debunked the claims, calling the allegations "transparently false".

According to researcher Adam Rawnsley, the Kremlin has a history of discrediting ordinary biology labs in former Soviet republics, and previously spread conspiracy theories about Georgia and Kazakhstan similar to those deployed against Ukraine.

==== Birds as bio-weapons ====
Prior to March 2022, the Russian Ministry of Defence made unsubstantiated accusations that the United States was manufacturing bio-weapons in Ukraine. In March the Ministry followed up with another conspiracy theory: the US was training birds to spread disease in Ukraine among Russian citizens, according to Major General Igor Konashenkov, spokesman for the Ministry of Russian state-controlled media. He mentioned specific details, including a strain of influenza with 50% mortality, and Newcastle disease. Media reports included maps, documents, and photos of birds with American military insignia, and claimed that infected birds had been captured alive in eastern Ukraine.

A U.S. State Department spokesman laughed these claims off and called them "outright lies", "total nonsense", "absurd", "laughable" and "propaganda". CIA Director William Burns told the U.S.Senate that Russia made these claims to prepare the terrain for a biological or chemical attack against Ukraine, which they would then blame on the United States and Ukraine.

==== Combat mosquitoes ====
On 28 October 2022 Vasily Nebenzya, Permanent Representative of Russia to the United Nations, accused Ukraine of using drones with "combat mosquitoes" which spread "dangerous viruses".

==== Ukrainian plans to use a dirty bomb ====
In March 2022, Russian state-controlled news agencies claimed, without evidence, that Ukraine was developing a plutonium-based dirty bomb nuclear weapon at the Chernobyl Nuclear Power Plant.

In a series of calls to foreign defence officials made in October 2022, Russian Minister of Defence Sergei Shoigu similarly claimed that Ukraine was preparing a "provocation" involving the use of a dirty bomb. The Institute for the Study of War suggested a desire to slow or suspend foreign aid to Ukraine as a possible motive for the allegations. The foreign ministries of France, the United Kingdom and the United States rejected "Russia's transparently false allegations". In a briefing, the Russian Ministry of Defence used photos of the Beloyarsk Nuclear Power Station, the Novosibirsk Chemical Concentrates Plant, the aftermath of the September 11 attacks, and a photo from a 2010 presentation by the Slovenian Radioactive Waste Management Agency as "evidence" for its claims.

=== Denial of Russian war crimes ===
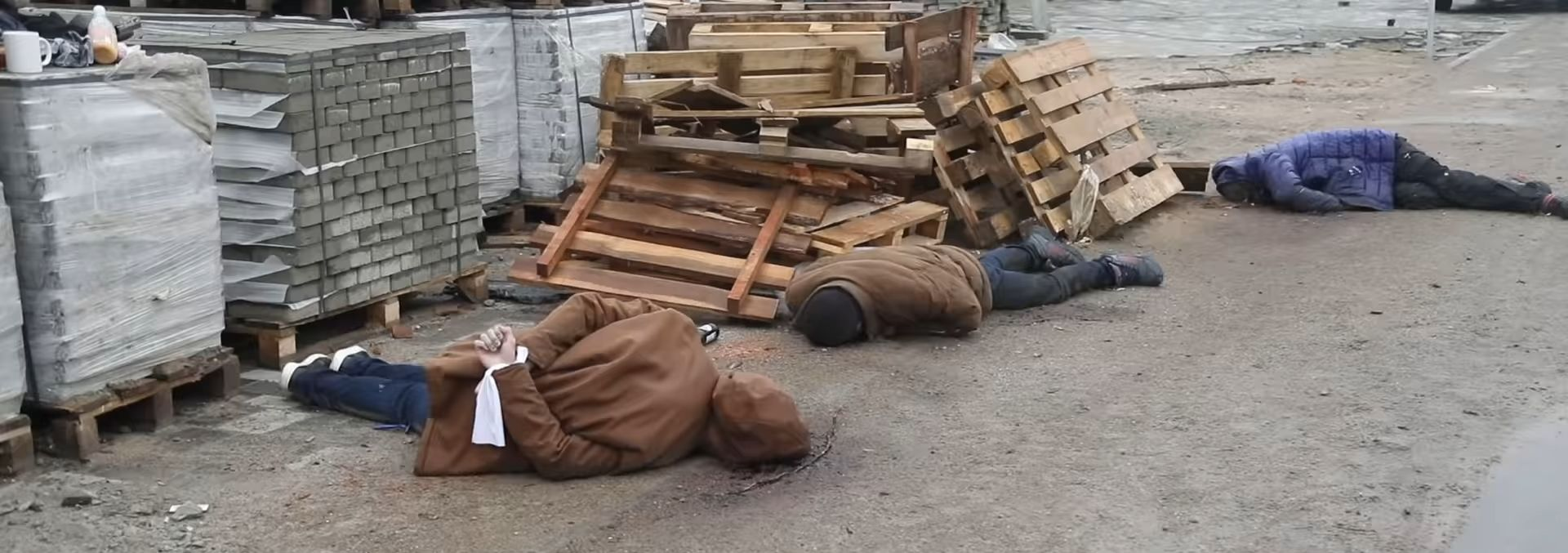
Victims of the Bucha massacre, which Russian propaganda claims was faked

During the Russian invasion of Ukraine, numerous war crimes and crimes against humanity were recorded and extensively documented, including attacks on civilians and energy-related infrastructure, wilful killings, unlawful confinement, torture, rape, and unlawful deportations of children. Russian officials denied the war crimes perpetrated by Russian forces. Russian foreign minister Sergey Lavrov called the Bucha massacre a "fake attack" against Russia, claiming it was staged. He said that Russian forces had left Bucha on 30 March while evidence of killings had emerged, according to him, four days later.

In March 2022, Facebook removed official Russian posts claiming that the Mariupol hospital airstrike was a hoax, for breaking their rules against denying violent events. FakeReporter, an Israeli watchdog group, found that the posts were still present on several Russian ministry social media accounts.

On 4 April at the United Nations, Russian representative Vasily Nebenzya said that the bodies in the videos were not there when Russian forces withdrew from Bucha. This was contradicted by satellite images showing that the bodies were there as early as 19 March; the position of the corpses in the satellite images matches the smartphone photos taken in early April.

The Russian Defence Ministry's Telegram channel said Russian forces did not target civilians during the battle. According to them, a massacre could not have been covered up by the Russian military, and the mass grave in the city was filled with victims of Ukrainian airstrikes. The Ministry said it had analyzed a video purporting to show the bodies of dead civilians in Bucha, and the corpses were moving. The BBC's Moscow office investigated this claim and concluded there was no evidence the video had been staged. Russia also released a video that, according to the Kremlin, showed a corpse supposedly moving, although this was quickly deemed false after investigations by fact-checking websites determined that it was a corpse reflected in the rearview mirror of a car. Adrien Bocquet, a French journalist who applied for Russian citizenship and was given awards by the Kremlin, blamed Ukrainian forces for the massacre. Many of his assertions were proven false by fact-checkers, who showed that he had even photoshopped pictures to support his representation of events, that he had changed his story several times, and that the dates of his trip did not match his narrative.

Another attempt to depict the massacre as fake aired on the Russian state television channel Russia-24, using a video that the channel claimed showed Ukrainians arranging mannequins in order to "stage" the Bucha massacre. The footage was quickly identified as coming from a television set filmed in Saint Petersburg. Workers for the television show confirmed that the video was from a Russian television show. Similarly, a video showing Ukrainian soldiers pulling dead bodies with cables in Bucha was widely shared by pro-Russian social media, supposedly to prove that the scene was staged. The provenance of the video is the Associated Press; its report explains that the use of cables was due to concern of the dead bodies being possibly booby-trapped. Videos showing Ukrainian forces searching for explosives under the corpses, falsely claiming they were placing the bodies to fake the massacre, were also shared in social media. Russian officials also blamed Ukrainian forces for the Mariupol theatre airstrike, though independent sources confirmed that Russia was responsible.

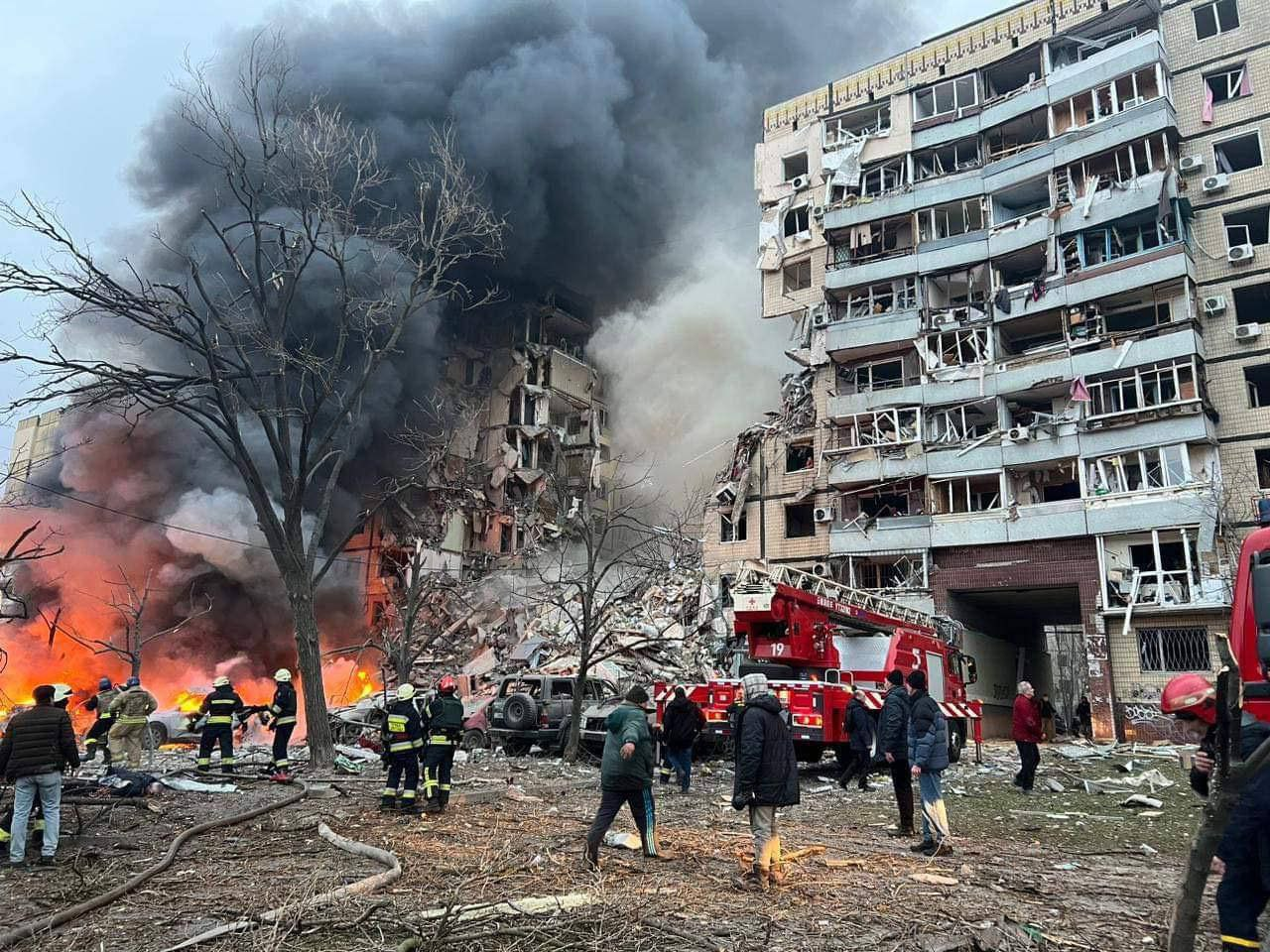
Residential building in Dnipro after Russian missile strike on 14 January 2023. Dmitry Peskov claimed that the residential building probably collapsed due to a Ukrainian air defense counterattack.

In November 2022, Putin's spokesman Dmitry Peskov denied that the Russian military was attacking civilian infrastructure in Ukraine. According to Peskov, the Russian army only attacked targets directly or indirectly connected to military potential. In January 2023, the Russian Ministry of Defence confirmed their responsibility for the Dnipro residential building airstrike, which killed over 40 civilians. But Peskov said that Russian forces never attack residential buildings and the residential building probably collapsed because of a Ukrainian air defence counterattack.

In December 2022, Russian opposition politician Ilya Yashin was sentenced to eight-and-a-half years in prison for his statements about the killings in Bucha on charges of "spreading false information" about the armed forces. Yashin was tried over a YouTube video released in April 2022 in which he discussed the discovery of murdered Ukrainian civilians in the suburban town of Bucha, near Kyiv. In February 2023, Russian journalist Maria Ponomarenko was sentenced to six years in prison for publishing information about the Mariupol theatre airstrike.

=== Alleged ban on Russian language and Orthodox Christianity ===
The law of Ukraine "On Protecting the functioning of the Ukrainian language as the State language" approved on 25 April 2019, gives priority to the Ukrainian language in more than 30 spheres of public life: in particular in public administration, media, education, science, culture, advertising, services. However, it does not regulate private communication nor ban the use of Russian language in the country, contrary to what some online claims created by Russia have asserted. Russian remains a widely used language in Ukraine in pop culture and in informal and business communication.

On 20 August 2024, the Verkhovna Rada of Ukraine banned the Russian Orthodox Church in Ukraine by adopting the Law of Ukraine "On the Protection of the Constitutional Order in the Field of Activities of Religious Organizations". Ukrainian religious organizations affiliated with the Russian Orthodox Church will be banned 9 months from the moment the State Service of Ukraine for Ethnopolicy and Freedom of Conscience issues the order, if this religious organization does not sever relations with the Russian Orthodox Church in accordance with Orthodox canon law. This prohibition did not extend to Eastern Orthodoxy in general, nor did encourage to set fire to Orthodox churches, contrary to what some online claims asserted.

=== Other Russian claims ===
==== Start of the war ====
Many people outside Ukraine, including politicians and commentators, regard 24 February 2022 as the start of Russia's war with Ukraine. According to political scientist Andreas Umland and co-authors, this approach diminishes the significance of the 2014 Russian annexation of Crimea and its military operation in the Donbas. This line of argument helps Russian propaganda present a justification for its aggression. Umland regards 20 February 2014 as the start of the Russia-Ukraine war. On that day, a column of Russian armored vehicles departed Sevastopol's Cossack Bay, and the same date is engraved on the Russian Crimea campaign medal. Most researchers, however, prefer 27 February 2014, when Russian forces occupied the Crimean parliament.

Shortly before the beginning of the full-scale invasion in 2022, the Russian government denied that such an invasion would take place.

On 7 September 2022, at the Eastern Economic Forum, Putin claimed that Russia did not "start" any military operations, but was only trying to end those that started in 2014, after a "coup d'état in Ukraine". Conversely, Russia's annexation of Crimea in February 2014 is regarded as the start of the Russo-Ukrainian war.

Before Russia began its full-scale invasion of Ukraine in 2022, the intensity of the hostilities in the Donbas had been steadily declining since the signing of the Minsk agreements in February 2015.

==== Ukrainian Satanism and black magic ====
In May 2022, Russian state media claimed that Ukraine was using black magic to fend off the Russian military. RIA Novosti said that evidence of black magic had been found in an eastern Ukrainian village; according to their report, Ukrainian soldiers had allegedly consecrated their weapons "with blood magick" at a location with a "satanic seal".

Dmitry Medvedev, deputy chairman of Russia's Security Council and also a former Russian president and prime minister, described the invasion as a sacred war against Satan. Vladimir Solovyov, a presenter on state-owned channel Russia-1, also called the invasion a "holy war" against "Satanists" and said Russia is up against fifty countries "united by Satanism".

Assistant secretary of Russia's Security Council Aleksey Pavlov called for the "de-Satanisation" of Ukraine in October 2022, claiming that the country had turned into a "totalitarian hypersect". In an article for the Russian state-owned Argumenty i Fakty newspaper, he identified the Chabad-Lubavitch Hasidic Jewish movement as one of the "hundreds of neo-pagan cults" operating in Ukraine. Russia's chief rabbi, Berel Lazar, wrote a letter to Russian authorities, asking them to condemn Pavlov's comments, which he described as "a new variety of old blood libels". About 70% of Ukrainians are religious, and half of those attend religious services.

==== False flag fakes ====
In March 2022, videos were discovered purporting to show Ukrainian-produced disinformation about missile strikes inside Ukraine which were then "debunked" as some other event outside Ukraine. However, this may be the first case of a disinformation false-flag operation, as the original, supposedly "Ukraine-produced" disinformation was never disseminated by anyone, and was in fact preventive disinformation created specifically to be debunked and cause confusion and mitigate the impact on the Russian public of real footage of Russian strikes within Ukraine that may get past Russian-controlled media. According to Patrick Warren, head of Clemson's Media Forensics Hub, "It's like Russians actually pretending to be Ukrainians spreading disinformation. ... The reason that it's so effective is because you don't actually have to convince someone that it's true. It's sufficient to make people uncertain as to what they should trust."

The Olenivka prison massacre, described by most independent experts as a Russian-orchestrated sabotage, has been reported by Russian media as a missile attack by Ukraine. While the exact cause of the incident has still not been conclusively confirmed, most experts conclude the Russian version highly improbable.

==== False claims about President Zelenskyy ====
The Russian state media agency TASS claimed that Ukrainian president Volodymyr Zelenskyy fled Kyiv following the invasion and also that he had surrendered. Zelenskyy used social media to post statements, videos and photos to counter the Russian disinformation.

Russian state-owned television channel Russia-1 spread false claims that Zelenskyy fled Ukraine following the 10 October 2022 missile strikes.

On social media, it has been falsely claimed through digitally altered videos or footage cuts that president Zelenskyy (and sometimes other European leaders) are addicted to narcotics like cocaine.

==== Boris Johnson preventing peace ====
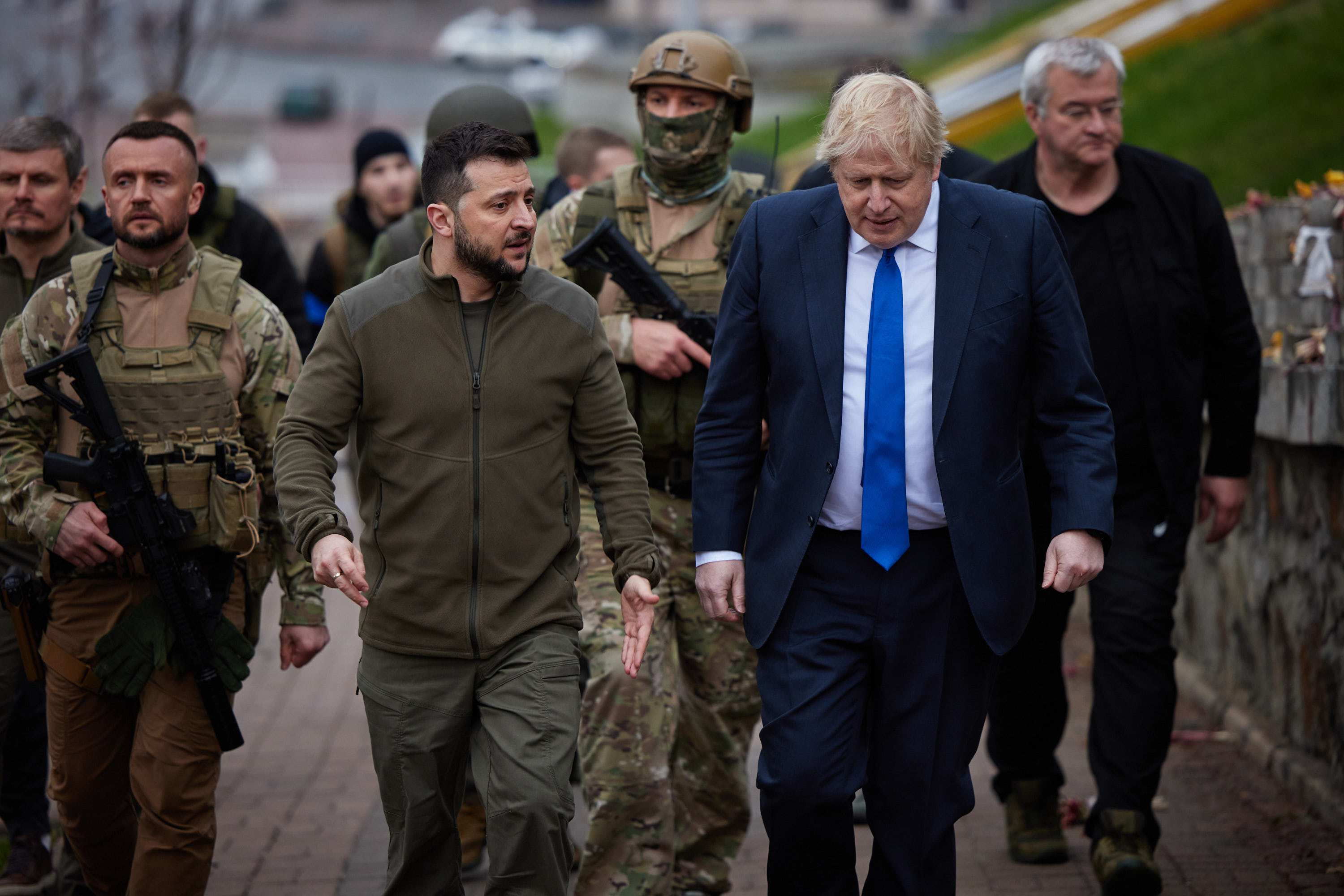
Boris Johnson and Volodymyr Zelenskyy in Kyiv, 9 April 2022

A Russian claim is that British prime minister Boris Johnson was to blame for the failure of the Istanbul peace negotiations in March-April 2022, by pressuring Ukrainian diplomats not to sign a peace agreement. The claim is based on a May 2022 article in Ukrainska Pravda. According to the article, Johnson arrived in Kyiv on 9 April and told the Ukrainians that Putin "should be pressured, not negotiated with" and that the UK was not willing to sign an agreement with Russia.

This claim that Johnson scuppered a peace agreement was denied by Ukrainian president Zelenskyy and by Ukrainian negotiator Davyd Arakhamia. They clarified that no agreement was about to be signed, and that the negotiations had already failed due to disagreement on key issues, before Johnson even arrived in Kyiv. Furthermore, negotiations continued after Johnson's visit. On 16 April 2022, Zelenskyy tried to break the deadlock by proposing two separate treaties: an agreement on security guarantees "from those who are prepared to give such security guarantees", and a bilateral agreement between Ukraine and Russia.

In an article for Foreign Affairs, political scientists Samuel Charap and Sergey Radchenko studied several of the draft agreements, interviewed participants in the talks, and reviewed statements by Ukrainian and Russian officials. They concluded that negotiations failed because of several things: the failure to focus on reaching a ceasefire first of all; disagreement between Russia and Ukraine over key issues (outlined here); the unwillingness of Ukraine's Western partners to give absolute security guarantees; the uncovering of Russian atrocities against civilians such as the Bucha massacre in early April; and Ukraine's confidence in a military solution after Russia's retreat from the north. Some on the Ukrainian side did not believe Russia was negotiating in good faith, and did not trust Russia to uphold an agreement.

Simon Shuster, a journalist who wrote a biography of Zelenskyy, said:

Ukraine was left to rely on Russia's word. After Bucha, that seemed like a bad idea. Plus Ukraine had just achieved a big military victory, and Zelenskyy wanted to keep that momentum going on the battlefield. Boris encouraged him. But he was one relatively minor factor among many.

Kremlin envoy Kirill Dmitriev later claimed that "Boris Johnson sabotaged the ready-to-be-signed Russia-Ukraine peace deal after he received a £1 million donation from a military drone manufacturer". This claim was repeated by Russian state media. However, this donation was made in November 2022, when Johnson was no longer prime minister.

==== Anti-refugee sentiments ====
Russian disinformation has also attempted to promote anti-refugee sentiments in Poland and other countries with an influx of mostly Ukrainian refugees from the war. Social media accounts with ties to Russia have promoted stories of refugees committing crimes or being unfairly privileged, or about locals discriminating against refugees (in particular, against black and non-Ukrainian refugees). Such disinformation is intended to weaken international support for Ukraine.

==== Crucified bodies ====
Hoaxes about crucified civilians and soldiers by the Ukrainian military were deliberately spread by the Kremlin. One story claimed that Ukrainian soldiers crucified a three-year-old boy at "Lenin Square" in Sloviansk. Investigative journalists from the Russian news outlets Novaya Gazeta and TV Rain, who visited Sloviansk, did not find any evidence to support the allegations. They also noted the absence of audio or video footage of the incident, which was unusual since actions of the Ukrainian army in the city were otherwise well documented at the time. BBC News pointed out that there is no "Lenin Square" in Sloviansk, although there is an "October Revolution Square". Some Russian journalists condemned the fabrication of the story.

A video showing a group of people claiming to be members of the Azov Brigade setting a crucified body of a supposed separatist soldier on fire also spread on social media. Representatives of the brigade themselves deny any connection to the video, arguing that the uniforms of the people shown in the video differ from those of Azov Brigade fighters, since the shoulder insignia is much larger than it should be, and the weapon appears to be pneumatic. They also point out that the person nailed to the cross does not scream while lifting the cross, that the persons are speaking broken Ukrainian and the video stops shortly after the cross is set on fire, so it is unknown whether the person died. It is noteworthy that the video presents the people in military uniform as fighters of the Azov Brigade. However, by 2014 Azov had been reorganized and expanded into a regiment within the National Guard, making it unlikely that members of the unit would be unaware of the change. Another video of two people being hanged was received with skepticism, since the video footage shows one of the person's abdomen moving forward while the weight of the body is not concentrated on the neck, suggesting the actors wear special equipment that is used while climbing cliffs. They also draw attention to the fact that the persons involved in the "hanging" ensure that the bodies do not rotate and their backs do not appear during the video.

==== "Grandmother with red flag" ====
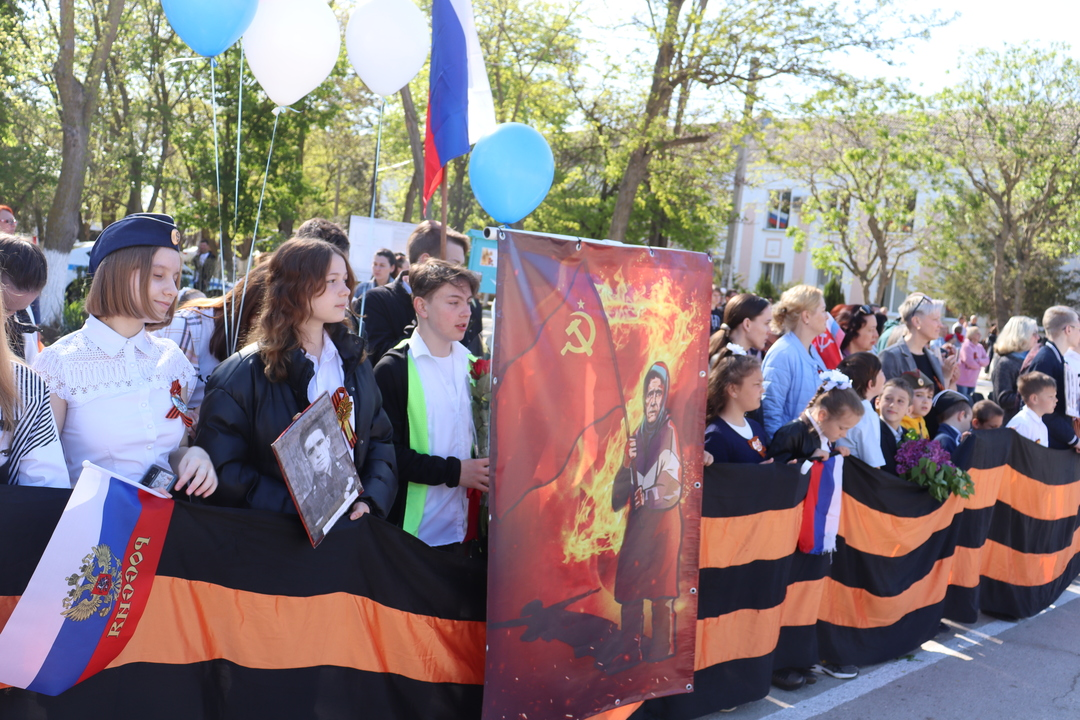
Propaganda poster of grandmother with red flag, Saky, Crimea, 9 May 2022

A video showing an elderly woman holding the Soviet national flag to greet the Ukrainian military has been widely spread in Runet since March 2022. The grandmother with a red flag was turned into an iconic image by Russian propaganda. Allegedly, it represents the desire of "ordinary Ukrainians" to reunite with their "Russian brothers".

Anna Ivanivna, the subject of the "grandmother with red flag" video, explained that she mistook the Ukrainian military for Russian invaders and she wanted to "placate" them with a Soviet flag so they would not destroy the village. She now regrets it and feels like a "traitor". Her house near Kharkiv was destroyed by the Russian army, and she and her husband have been evacuated. She cursed the Russian army which she deemed was responsible for shelling her house. The Ukrainian military appealed to the public to not chastise Anna Ivanivna, who was a victim herself.

==== "French mercenaries" killed in Kharkiv ====
On 16 January 2024, Russia carried out a missile strike on a multi-storey building in Kharkiv, claiming it had killed a dozen "French mercenaries". Local authorities said that 17 civilians were injured and that there was no military target in the building. Russian media even published a list of 13 French men ostensibly killed in the attack. French network Radio France Internationale (RFI) contacted two people on the list, Alexis Drion and Béranger Minaud, volunteers of the International Legion of Ukraine who were both in France during this attack on Kharkiv, and made an interview with them, confirming they never died and that the story is Russian propaganda. RFI assumes this was tied to the French announcement of a delivery of 40 SCALP missiles to the Ukrainian Army.

==== Russian claims about Ukrainian civilians ====
- "Russian soldiers will be welcomed as heroes by civilians for liberating them in Ukraine"
  - Ukrainians confront Russian tanks with bare hands
  - Ukrainians jubilant as Ukraine retakes Kherson
- "No strikes are being made on civilian infrastructure" - In February 2022 Russian foreign minister Sergei Lavrov "Russian armed forces do not attack civilian objects on the territory of Ukraine" - June 2023 Russian foreign minister Sergei Lavrov
  - Russia's full-scale aggression has caused $137.8 billion damage to Ukraine's infrastructure in a year.
- "Civilians are not being targeted"
  - The United Nations estimated that as of 24 July, the war had killed or injured more than 12,000 civilians
  - Civilians are tortured and killed
  - Civilians suffer wilful killings, attacks, unlawful confinement, torture, rape and sexual violence, as well as forcible transfer and deportation of children - Chair of the Independent International Commission of Inquiry on Ukraine, to the General Assembly
  - At least 10,000 killed civilians confirmed by the UN since the beginning of the full-scale Russian invasion - November 2023
- The Kremlin claimed "they do not intend to impose anything by force."
  - Civilians who refuse Russian passports denied medical facilities
  - Civilians without passports threatened with deportation
- "Ukrainian citizens can decide on their future" - President Putin 12 June 2021

==== Claims of Wikipedia publishing false information ====
Amongst Russia's attempts to control the free press and present their own views are attacks on Wikipedia, which has been on a government registry of prohibited websites for over 10 years.

In May 2022, the Wikimedia Foundation was fined 5 million rubles for articles about the Russian invasion of Ukraine. Russia claimed to have uncovered 16.6 million messages spreading "fakes" about the invasion on platforms including Wikipedia. The Wikimedia Foundation appealed the ruling in June, stating the "information at issue is fact-based and verified by volunteers who continuously edit and improve articles on the site; its removal would therefore constitute a violation of people's rights to free expression and access to knowledge."

In November 2022, a Russian court fined the Wikimedia Foundation 2 million rubles for not deleting "false" information in seven articles about the "special military operation", including the Bucha massacre and the Mariupol theatre airstrike.

In February 2023, a Russian court imposed a fine of 2 million rubles on the Wikimedia Foundation for failing to remove "misinformation" about the Russian military. In April 2023, another fine of 800,000 rubles was imposed on the Wikimedia Foundation for not removing materials about Russian rock band Psiheya, with another fine of 2 million rubles being imposed in relation to other articles such as the Russian language version of Russian occupation of Zaporizhzhia Oblast.

==== Support for Hamas ====
On 8 October 2023, a day after the 7 October attacks, a video supposedly of Hamas thanking Ukraine for supplying them with weapons was shared by an X account linked to the Wagner Group. It was viewed over 300,000 times and shared by American far-right accounts. The next day, former Russian president Dmitry Medvedev tweeted, "Well, NATO buddies, you've really got it, haven't you? The weapons handed to the Nazi regime in Ukraine are now being actively used against Israel." On 10 October, another video was released falsely claiming to be made by the BBC and purported to quote the investigative journalism website Bellingcat to confirm the sale of weapons between Ukraine and Hamas. Both the BBC and Bellingcat confirmed that the video was a fake and the claim was false.

==== Organ harvesting and pedophilia ====
In April 2022, Canada's Communications Security Establishment said there was a coordinated effort by Russia to promote false reports about Ukraine harvesting organs from dead soldiers, women and children.

In May 2023, RT aired a documentary titled Tanks for Kidneys, which promotes false claims that Ukraine has been selling organs since 2014, including from children in orphanages and Ukrainian soldiers.

In 2025, false news reports gained traction online and fuelled conspiracy theories that Russian airstrikes in Ukraine usually target pedophile and child trafficking schemes.

==== Involvement in the Crocus City Hall attack ====
In March 2024, four Tajik ISIS–K gunmen launched an attack on a concert hall in Krasnogorsk, Russia, with rifles and incendiaries, killing 145. Ukrainian officials described Russian claims that the perpetrators of the Crocus City Hall attack tried to escape to Ukraine as "very doubtful and primitive" disinformation, recalling that the border is heavily guarded by soldiers and drones, mined in many areas, and constantly shelled from both sides. Latvia-based Russian news outlet Meduza has reported that pro-government and state-funded media in Russia have been instructed by the Russian government to highlight possible "traces" of Ukrainian involvement in the attack.

On the evening of the attack, Russian television channel NTV broadcast a doctored video using audio deepfaking, purporting to show Oleksiy Danilov, the Secretary of the National Security and Defense Council of Ukraine, confirming Ukrainian involvement in the attack, supposedly saying, "It's fun in Moscow today, I think it's very fun. I would like to believe that we will arrange such fun for them more often." The deepfake was created by patching together previous news streams of the Ukrainian 1+1 channel.

In late March 2024, more than 50% of Russians believed that Ukraine was responsible for the terrorist attack, while 27% said Islamic State was responsible and 6% blamed the so-called "collective West", according to a survey conducted by OpenMinds. The Islamic State was blamed most often by young people aged 18–30 who opposed the war in Ukraine. Russia's Investigative Committee investigation completed in 2025 indicated no Ukrainian involvement, contrary to the previous public statements from the authorities.

==== Attack on Putin's residence ====
In December 2025, Putin made a claim to US president Donald Trump that Ukraine had attacked Putin's personal residence, no evidence was found for the alleged attack, and the CIA assessed Ukraine were not targeting a residence used by Putin.

==== Olympics disinformation campaign ====
In February 2026, BBC Verify said that a major Russian disinformation operation was using the 2026 Winter Olympics to paint Ukrainian fans and athletes in a bad light using fake news stories, with the goal of undermining Western support for Ukraine.

==== False reports of military success ====
In October 2025, TVP World said Russian state media, including TASS, published statements by the Russian Defense Ministry falsely claiming Russian troops had "successfully landed" on Karantynnyi Island in Kherson, "taken control of key facilities" and "repelled all counterattacks by the Armed Forces of Ukraine." The reports were later deleted, and the Southern Ukraine Defense said on social media that Russian state media were spreading fabricated claims about capturing Kherson. According to the Institute for the Study of War, Russia deliberately uses false reports as part of cognitive warfare.

Meduza said in May 2026 that a compilation of pro-Kremlin pundit Boris Rozhin repeatedly stating the village of Mala Tokmachka being ″nearly cleared″ had become the most popular military meme in 2026, becoming a symbol of the lies of Russian military officials and bloggers. The village's name has also come to be associated with the gap between Russia's military ambitions and its actual capabilities.

In November 2026, the Financial Times reported that Putin's determination to achieve battlefield results had likely led the Russian military command to exaggerate their successes by using AI-generated videos depicting captures of territory which do not exist in reality. Analysts from the Institute for the Study of War identified at least 35 videos between June and August 2026 as being possibly AI-generated, with 10 of them determined to be with a ″high degree of certainty″.

==== Russian use of AI for propaganda ====
Fake videos made with generative AI were created as part of a propaganda war against Ukraine and shared in social media. These included depictions of children in the Armed Forces of Ukraine, fake ads targeting children encouraging them to denounce critics of the Ukrainian government, or fictitious statements by Ukrainian president Volodymyr Zelenskyy using deepfake technology about the country's surrender, among others. AI-generated images depicting drafted Ukrainian soldiers weeping and in peril, as well as false claims of Jewish Ukrainians purportedly not being elligible for conscription spread on social media too.

A number of fabricated CNN headlines and stories went viral on social media, including of a faked image of CNN reporting that Steven Seagal had been seen alongside the Russian military, false tweets claiming that a CNN journalist had been killed in Ukraine, a CNN lower third that was digitally altered to include a claim that Putin had issued a statement warning India not to interfere in the conflict, and another that was altered to claim that Putin planned to delay the 2022 Russian invasion of Ukraine until "Biden delivers weapons to Ukraine for Russia to capture", as well as a fabricated CNN tweet supposedly reporting on a figure referred to as "the Kharkiv Kid finder" alongside an image that actually portrayed the YouTuber Vaush, who lives in the US and was not in Kharkiv at the time.

Other Western stations, including the BBC, DW and Euronews, have seen similar fakes distributed.

==== Claims of "mass exodus" from Kyiv ====
In August and September 2026, many social media accounts spread disinformation that Kyiv residents were fleeing the capital en masse, accompanied by videos and photographs of crowds and traffic. These images and videos were from immediately after the 2022 invasion, from outside Ukraine, or showed normal traffic jams and rush-hour traffic in Kyiv.

== Ukrainian themes ==
=== Ghost of Kyiv ===
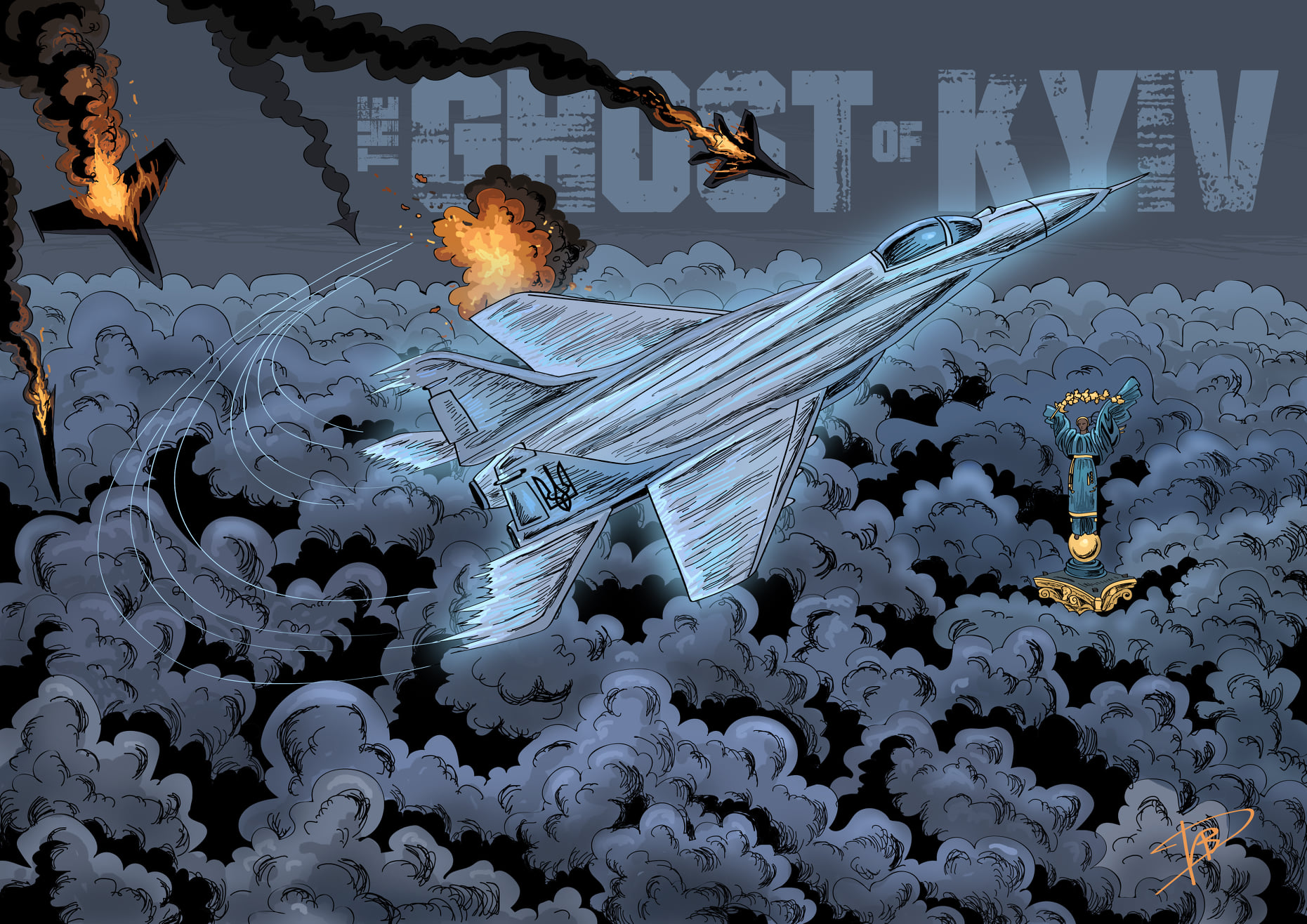
Ghost of Kyiv, painting by Ukrainian illustrator Andrii Dankovych

On the second day of the 2022 Russian invasion of Ukraine, videos and picture went viral on social media, with claims that a Ukrainian pilot nicknamed the "Ghost of Kyiv" had shot down 6 Russian fighter jets in the first 30 hours of the war. There is no credible evidence that he existed. A video of the alleged pilot was shared on Facebook and the official Twitter account of the Ukrainian Ministry of Defence, was later found to be from the video game Digital Combat Simulator World. An altered photo was also shared by the former president of Ukraine, Petro Poroshenko. On 30 April 2022, Ukrainian Air Force asked the "Ukrainian community not to neglect the basic rules of information hygiene" and to "check the sources of information, before spreading it", stating that the Ghost of Kyiv "embodies the collective spirit of the highly qualified pilots of the Tactical Aviation Brigade who are successfully defending Kyiv and the region".

The Ukrainian Air Force later admitted that the Ghost of Kyiv was a fabrication. Despite this, The Times and several other outlets published stories without evidence asserting that the pilot was real and had died.

=== Snake Island ===
In the first days of the invasion, Ukrainian officials and media outlets reported that the Ukrainian border guards stationed on Snake Island had been killed after refusing to surrender to a Russian warship. AFP Fact Check reported that Anton Gerashchenko, an adviser to the Ukrainian Ministry of Internal Affairs, said that 13 border guards had been killed, and that President Volodymyr Zelenskyy later praised them as having died heroically. On 28 February 2022, however, the Ukrainian navy said that the troops were in fact alive and had been captured by Russian forces.

AFP wrote that many posts claiming that the defenders had died continued to circulate even after the Ukrainian navy's correction. The article quoted communications scholar Arnaud Mercier as saying that the episode illustrated both the fog of war and the desire for propaganda on both sides, and that Ukrainian authorities had overinterpreted the available information rather than waiting for confirmation. RMIT ABC Fact Check also cited the Snake Island story as an example of wartime misreporting, noting that Ukraine had initially said it would posthumously honour the 13 guards before an official later said there was reason to believe that the soldiers were alive.

=== Ukrainian psychological operations ===
In the summer of 2022, a number of Ukrainian officials spread misleading information about the impending Ukrainian counteroffensive in the south of the country in the Kherson Oblast in order to regain control of Kherson. Ukrainian special forces have said that the highly publicized Ukrainian counteroffensive in the Kherson Oblast was a military disinformation campaign aimed at distracting Russian forces from the real offensive that was being prepared in the Kharkiv Oblast. Taras Berezovets, a spokesman for the Ukrainian special forces brigade, said: "[It] was a big special disinformation operation. ... [Russia] thought it would be in the south and moved their equipment. Then, instead of the south, the offensive happened where they least expected, and this caused them to panic and flee".

In September 2024, Novaya Gazeta Europe published an analysis of suspected Ukrainian bot activity on VKontakte. Using data from the Botnadzor project and machine-learning classification, the outlet said it had identified 2,369 suspected Ukrainian bot accounts that posted about 290,000 comments in around 1,500 VK communities between October 2022 and August 2024, compared with almost 13 million comments posted by pro-Kremlin bots during the same period. According to the investigation, these accounts usually imitated ordinary Russians and promoted narratives aimed at increasing distrust of the Russian authorities and military, including messages about insecurity inside Russia, the consequences of the war for border regions, mobilisation and the 2024 Russian presidential election. The outlet also noted that Russian propagandists often attribute such campaigns to Ukrainian TsIPSO, although direct attribution is usually difficult.

=== Claims about the 2022 missile explosion in Poland ===
On 15 November 2022, after an explosion killed two people in the Polish village of Przewodów, Zelenskyy said, without producing evidence, that Russian missiles had struck Poland, a NATO member state, and called it a "significant escalation" of the war. Reuters reported at the time that the cause of the explosion remained unclear, that Russia denied striking Polish territory, and that the Pentagon and the U.S. State Department said they could not confirm that Russian missiles had landed in Poland.

In September 2023, Reuters reported that Polish experts had confirmed that the missile which killed the two people had been fired by Ukraine, citing the Polish newspaper Rzeczpospolita. Reuters also reported that Warsaw and NATO had said at the time that they believed the missile was a Ukrainian stray, while Ukraine denied that one of its missiles had landed in Poland.

=== Rumors about Russian mobilisation ===
Alexander Titov from Queen's University Belfast notes that the rumours about new Russian mobilisation are "partly a misinformation campaign launched by Kyiv to sow dissent in Russia" and that the "spreading rumours of imminent mobilisation in Russian is clearly part of Ukraine's psychological warfare, but the more they do it without anything happening, the less credible it becomes".

On 22 September 2022, the "conscript base" of the 2022 Russian mobilisation from the hacker group Anonymous began to spread in Ukrainian Telegram channels. As it was claimed, the distributed file allegedly contained the passport data of more than 305 thousand Russians subject to mobilisation "first of all". It was also noted that Anonymous hackers obtained the data by hacking the website of the Russian defence ministry, but the group itself did not report this leak. The ministry did not comment on the alleged leak, but reposted "War on Fakes", a Telegram channel. The report says that the published database "is compiled from several open databases and has nothing to do with the Ministry of Defense." Ruslan Leviev, the founder of Conflict Intelligence Team, and Andrei Zakharov, a correspondent of the BBC News Russian, are of the opinion that the "conscript base" is a fake.

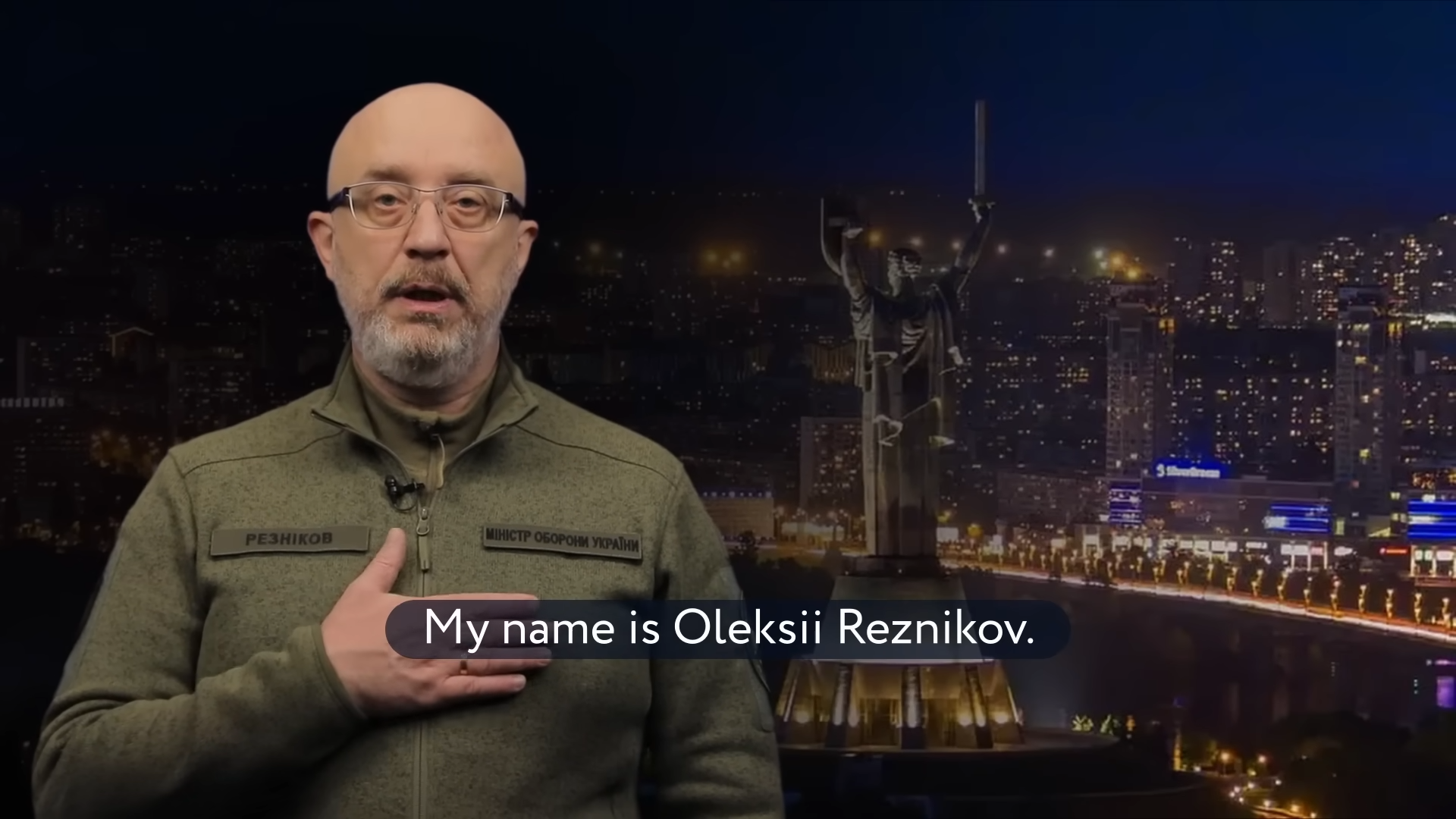
On 30 December 2022, Oleksii Reznikov announced a second wave of Russian mobilization, which was supposed to begin on 5 January 2023

In December 2022, Ukrainian Defense Minister Oleksii Reznikov and head of military intelligence Kyrylo Budanov claimed that a new wave of mobilisation would begin on 5 January 2023, but this did not happen. Then in January of the same year, Ukrainian officials continued to claim that 500,000 people would be mobilized that same month.

On 9 January 2023, information spread on social networks that the Federal Security Service sent all border services an order to restrict the departure of Russian citizens subject to conscription for military service. On 11 January, this statement was published, among other things, by the Main Directorate of Intelligence of the Ministry of Defense of Ukraine. Press Secretary of the Russian President, Dmitry Peskov, called that as "information sabotage". The head of the human rights group Agora, Pavel Chikov, called the "orders" a fake, because "the orders were executed inappropriately, although they are similar to the original ones". Factcheck.kg noted that, according to the Russian GOST for official documents, the date must be indicated in a "verbal-digital way" and that when writing an order it is also necessary to refer to the law. Paragraph 12 contains an extra character, which is also unacceptable. Also the document is not certified by the seal or signature of the relevant officials or organizations and, thus, is a fake.

On 5 September 2023, a document allegedly signed by Sergei Shoigu on a new wave of Russian mobilization appeared in the Ukrainian media and Telegram channels (including UNIAN). Regional and federal representatives of the Russian authorities called the "order" a fake. Russian independent media SOTA concluded that it was a fake and provided a number of arguments to support this opinion; for example, in Russian legislation there are not "representatives of military commissariats", but military commissars. A few days later, on 11 September, the General Staff of the Ukrainian Armed Forces published an unsubstantiated statement that Russia could soon launch a major mobilization campaign of 400,000 to 700,000 people.

== Other disinformation ==
The media focused much less on how other countries' propaganda during Russia's invasion of Ukraine worked to promote certain narratives.

=== Russosphere and Xenia Fedorova ===
Russosphere is a French-language social network that promotes pro-Russian propaganda in Africa. It was created in 2021, but fully launched in February 2022, prior to the invasion of Ukraine. It amassed over 65,000 followers on social media platforms such as Facebook, YouTube and Twitter, as well as Telegram and VK. The network's posts typically accuse France of modern-day "colonialism", describe the Ukrainian Army as "Nazis" and "Satanists", and praise the Wagner Group, a Russian private military company. In early 2023, the BBC and Logically reported that Russosphere was created by Luc Michel, a Belgian far-right activist.

In July 2026, the French interior ministry ordered Russian journalist Xenia Fedorova to leave the country after disinformation experts warned about her spreading of Kremlin-aligned talking points about Ukraine and the west. Libération cited the deportation order as accusing her of "acting as a conduit for disinformation campaigns orchestrated by the Russian authorities″.

=== Fakes involving celebrities ===
In March 2022, Visegrád 24 posted an unsourced tweet falsely claiming that Leonardo DiCaprio had donated $10 million to Ukraine. The false story was picked up by news outlets around the world, such as India's Hindustan Times, the U.K.'s The Independent and the Daily Mail, and American conservative websites The Daily Caller and the Washington Examiner, before being retracted.

In December 2023, Microsoft revealed that messages recorded by US actors on the website Cameo have been repurposed to spread misinformation about Ukrainian president Volodymyr Zelenskyy being a drug addict on social media and Russian state media. Wired reported that images of Western celebrities edited to contain pro-Russian and anti-Ukrainian quotes were spread on Facebook, with the operation being linked to Doppelganger, a Russian disinformation campaign.

== Censorship ==
=== In Russia ===
On 4 March 2022, Putin signed into law a bill introducing prison sentences of up to 15 years for those who publish "knowingly false information" about the Russian military and its operations, with the Russian government deciding what is the truth, leading to some media outlets in Russia to stop reporting on Ukraine or shutting their media outlet. Although the 1993 Russian Constitution has an article expressly prohibiting censorship, the Russian censorship apparatus Roskomnadzor ordered the country's media to only use information from Russian state sources or face fines and blocks, and accused a number of independent media outlets of spreading "unreliable socially significant untrue information" about the shelling of Ukrainian cities by the Russian army and civilian deaths.

Roskomnadzor launched an investigation against the Novaya Gazeta, Echo of Moscow, inoSMI, MediaZona, New Times, TV Rain, and other independent Russian media outlets for publishing "inaccurate information about the shelling of Ukrainian cities and civilian casualties in Ukraine as a result of the actions of the Russian Army". On 1 March 2022, the Russian government blocked access to TV Rain, as well as Echo of Moscow, in response to their coverage of the invasion of Ukraine by Russian forces. The channel closed, with its general director announcing they would be "temporarily halting its operations", on 3 March 2022; its frequencies were later reassigned to the Russian state propaganda outlet Sputnik Radio. Novaya Gazeta ceased publications on 28 March 2022 and its publishing license was revoked on 5 September, but it was quickly revived in Latvia as Novaya Gazeta Europe. The websites of Radio Free Europe/Radio Liberty, The Moscow Times, Radio France Internationale, The New Times and BBC News Russian were blocked.

As of December 2022, more than 4,000 people were prosecuted under "fake news" laws in connection with the war in Ukraine. Hugh Williamson, Europe and Central Asia director at Human Rights Watch, said that "These new laws are part of Russia's ruthless effort to suppress all dissent and make sure the [Russian] population does not have access to any information that contradicts the Kremlin's narrative about the invasion of Ukraine."

Due to Russian fake news laws, Russian authorities blocked Facebook and Twitter, while TikTok in Russia banned new uploads. However a study by Tracking Exposed found out that TikTok had blocked all non-Russian content, but has continued to host old videos uploaded by Russia-based accounts and permitted Russian state media to continue posting, described as establishing a "splinternet" within a global social media platform. TikTok's vague censorship has permitted pro-Kremlin news but blocked foreign accounts and critics of the war, as a result "Russians are left with a frozen TikTok, dominated by pro-war content".

=== In China ===
The BBC reported that coverage of the war was heavily censored on social media in China. Many stories and accounts supporting one or the other side were removed. A Taiwanese research group accused Chinese media of "regularly quoting disinformation and conspiracy theories from Russian sources".

In March 2022, China Global Television Network (CGTN) paid for digital ads on Facebook targeting users with newscasts featuring pro-Kremlin talking points after Meta Platforms banned Russian state media advertisements. The same month, CGTN repeated unsubstantiated Russian claims of biological weapons labs in Ukraine. China Daily blamed the United States as the driving force for the Russian invasion. A leaked internal directive from The Beijing News ordered its employees not to publish news reports that were "negative about Russia". An analysis found that nearly half of Weibo's social media posts used Russia sources which were pro-Putin or described Ukraine in negative terms, while another third of posts were anti-West and blamed NATO, while very few posts described the war in neutral terms. Several history professors have penned an open letter that strongly opposed China's support for "Russia's war against Ukraine" but their post was quickly deleted by censors, while a celebrity who criticized Russia over the invasion had her account suspended.

== Impact of Russian disinformation ==
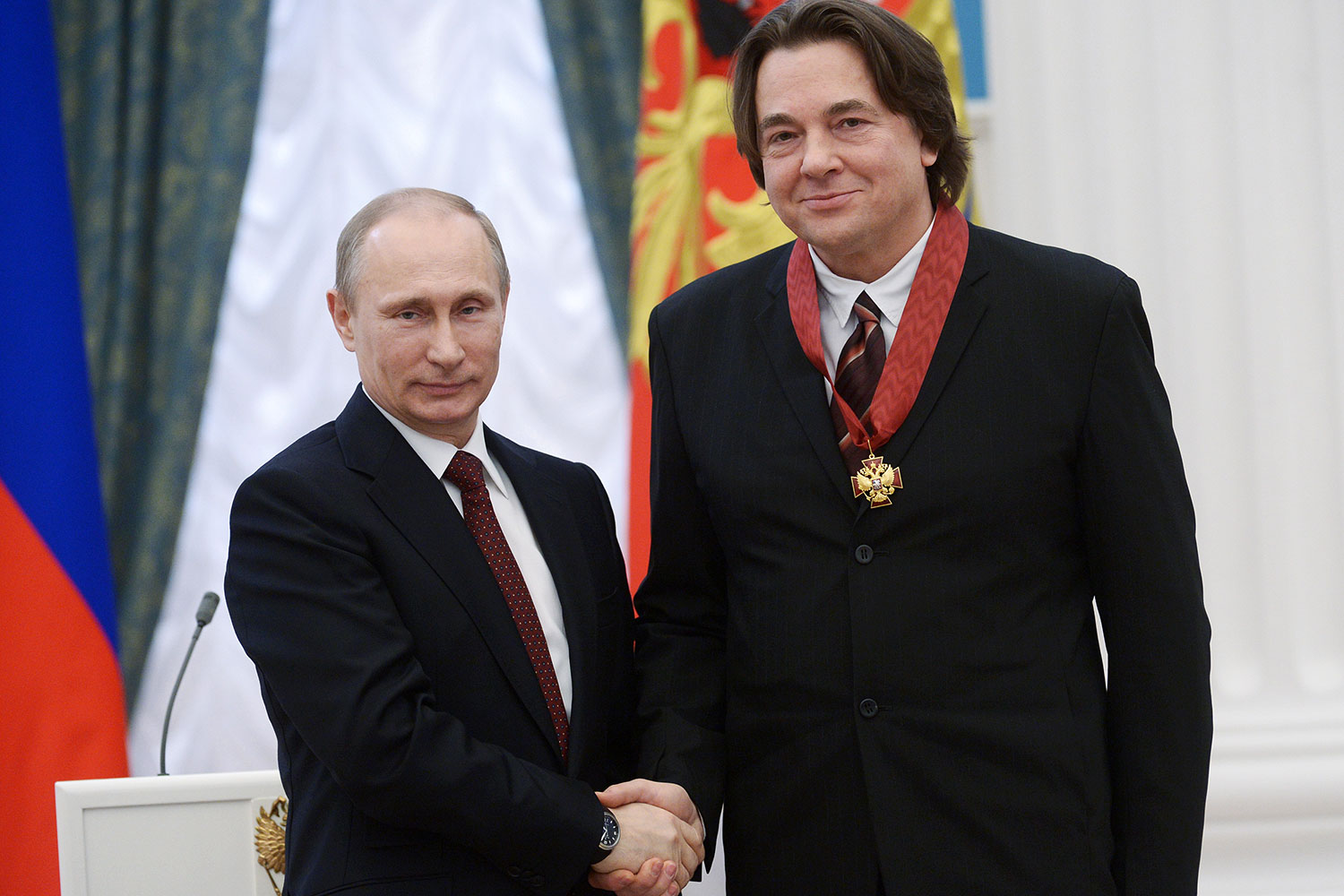
Putin and Konstantin Ernst, chief of Russia's main state-controlled TV station Channel One

=== Impact in Russia ===
In February 2022, Eliot Higgins of Bellingcat judged that the quality of Russian misinformation videos had weakened, but remained especially effective for the older generation of Russians. Some observers noted what they described as a "generational struggle" among Russians over perception of the war, with younger Russians often opposed to the war and older Russians more likely to accept the narrative presented by state-controlled mass media in Russia. Kataryna Wolczuk, an associate fellow of Chatham House's Russia and Eurasia programme, said that "[Older] Russians are inclined to think in line with the official 'narrative' that Russia is defending Russian speakers in Ukraine, so it's about offering protection rather than aggression." About two-thirds of Russians use television as their primary source of daily news. According to the cyber threat intelligence company Miburo, about 85% of Russians get most of their news from Russian state-controlled media.

Many Ukrainians say that their relatives and friends in Russia trust what the state-controlled media tells them and refuse to believe that there is a war in Ukraine and that the Russian army is shelling Ukrainian cities.

Some Western commentators have claimed that the main reason many Russians have supported Putin and the "special military operation" in Ukraine has to do with the propaganda and disinformation. At the end of March, a poll conducted in Russia by the Levada Center concluded the following: When asked why they think the military operation is taking place, respondents said it was to protect and defend civilians, ethnic Russians or Russian speakers in Ukraine (43%), to prevent an attack on Russia (25%), to get rid of nationalists and "denazify" Ukraine (21%), and to incorporate Ukraine and/or the Donbas region into Russia (3%)."

A series of four online polls by Alexei Navalny's Anti-Corruption Foundation found that between 25 February and 3 March, the share of respondents in Moscow who considered Russia an "aggressor" increased from 29% to 53%, while the share of those who considered Russia a "peacemaker" fell by half from 25% to 12%. On 5 April 2022, Alexei Navalny said the "monstrosity of lies" in the Russian state media "is unimaginable. And, unfortunately, so is its persuasiveness for those who have no access to alternative information." He tweeted that "warmongers" among Russian state media personalities "should be treated as war criminals. From the editors-in-chief to the talk show hosts to the news editors, [they] should be sanctioned now and tried someday."

On 3 April 2024, Russia's Defense Ministry announced that "around 16,000 citizens" had signed military contracts in the last 10 days to fight as contract soldiers in the Russo-Ukrainian War, with most of them saying they were motivated to "avenge those killed" in the Crocus City Hall attack.

=== Impact in the West ===
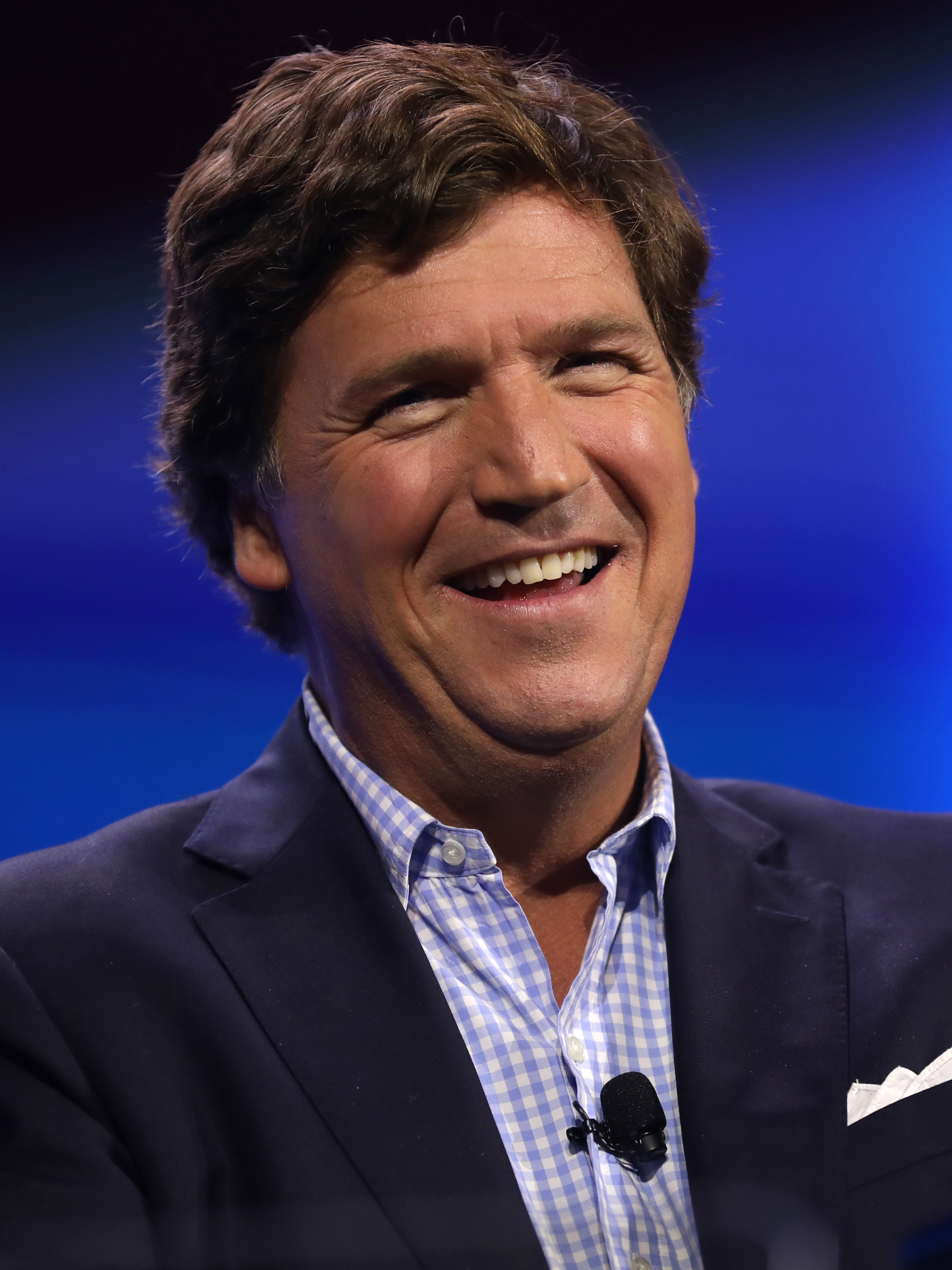
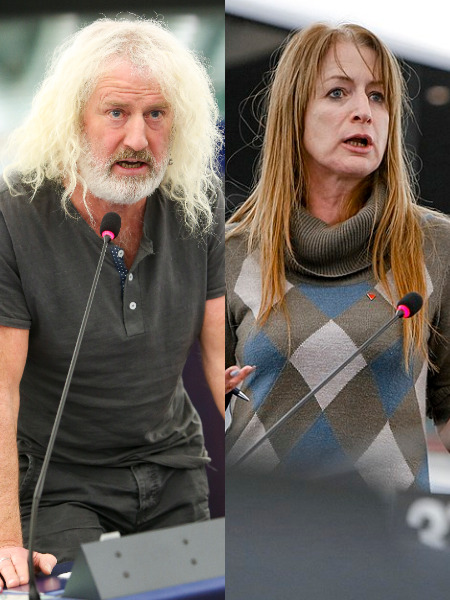
Far-right commentator Tucker Carlson, and far-left politicians Mick Wallace and Clare Daly, have been accused of promoting Russian disinformation.

In the Western world, the far-right and far-left have been most accepting of Russian narratives, and Russia has collaborated with both far-right and far-left groups to spread its disinformation. In doing so, Russia seeks to undermine Western support for Ukraine and to stoke division and unrest in those countries. To the far-right, Russia presents itself as fighting against globalism and liberalism, while to the far-left it presents itself as fighting against NATO "imperialism" and Ukrainian Nazis. This far-right and far-left alignment has been said to support the horseshoe theory.

Kremlin-funded media and online commentators target Western audiences with disinformation to undermine their countries' support for Ukraine. They try to foster a negative image of Ukraine and Ukrainians. They exaggerate Russia's military strength and successes, while portraying Ukrainian resistance as doomed and not worth supporting. Russian propaganda paints Western governments as "warmongers" for supporting Ukraine, and warns that their continued support will spark a nuclear war against NATO countries. Russian disinformation also claims that sanctions "have no effect on the Russian economy and instead backfire on Western countries". In Europe, Russia has carried out "multichannel, full-spectrum disinformation campaigns" with tailored messages for each country.

In 2025, Ukrainian president Zelenskyy said that Russian disinformation was influencing some in the new US administration, including president Trump and his envoy Steve Witkoff. Later that year, Witkoff drafted a peace plan with Russian envoy Kirill Dmitriev, which was condemned as favoring Russia.

Because of its disinformation and attempts to stoke unrest, the reputation of Russian media has been tarnished in many Western countries. In the wake of the 2022 Russian invasion, the EU and Canada banned Russian state-controlled media outlets RT and Sputnik.

In 2022, Facebook uncovered a Russian disinformation campaign using fake accounts, and attempts to hack the accounts of high-profile Ukrainians. There are reports of Russian government staff searching for "organic content" posted by genuine users in support of the Kremlin, while making sure that these do not run afoul of platform guidelines, then amplifying these posts. Researchers have found that Russia's Internet Research Agency has operated numerous troll farms who spam critics of the Kremlin with pro-Putin and pro-war comments.

In 2024, Russian documents were obtained and filed in court by the FBI, which outline a Russian operation to manipulate influential people in Europe and to target people on social media with posts, comments and fake news. The goal being to sow division within those countries, undermine support for Ukraine, and discredit Ukraine's allies using psychological warfare. The documents identified Germany as particularly vulnerable to Russian influence.

=== Impact in the "Global South" ===
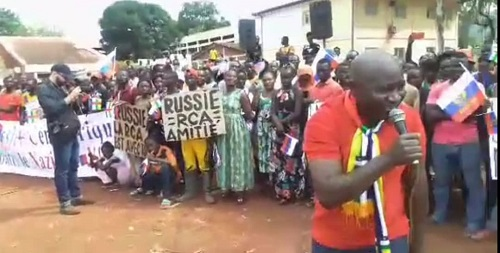
A pro-Russian demonstration in Bangui, Central African Republic, where Russian private military companies have been spreading disinformation about the war

Russia has been more successful spreading disinformation about the war in the Global South, particularly in the Sahel region of Africa, where Russia uses private military companies to support local regimes (see Wagner Group activities in Africa).

In China, India, Indonesia, Malaysia, Africa, the Arab world, and Latin America, social media users trended towards showing sympathy for Russian narratives. A study performed by Airlangga University revealed that 71% of Indonesian netizens supported the invasion. This support was due to affection for Putin's strongman leadership, as well as anti-US and anti-Western political alignments. Additionally, many Indonesians supported Russia due to positive reports of Ramzan Kadyrov and claims of the Azov Regiment covering their bullets with pork lard to be used against Muslim Chechen troops in the invasion.

== Countering Russian disinformation ==
Logo of NAFO

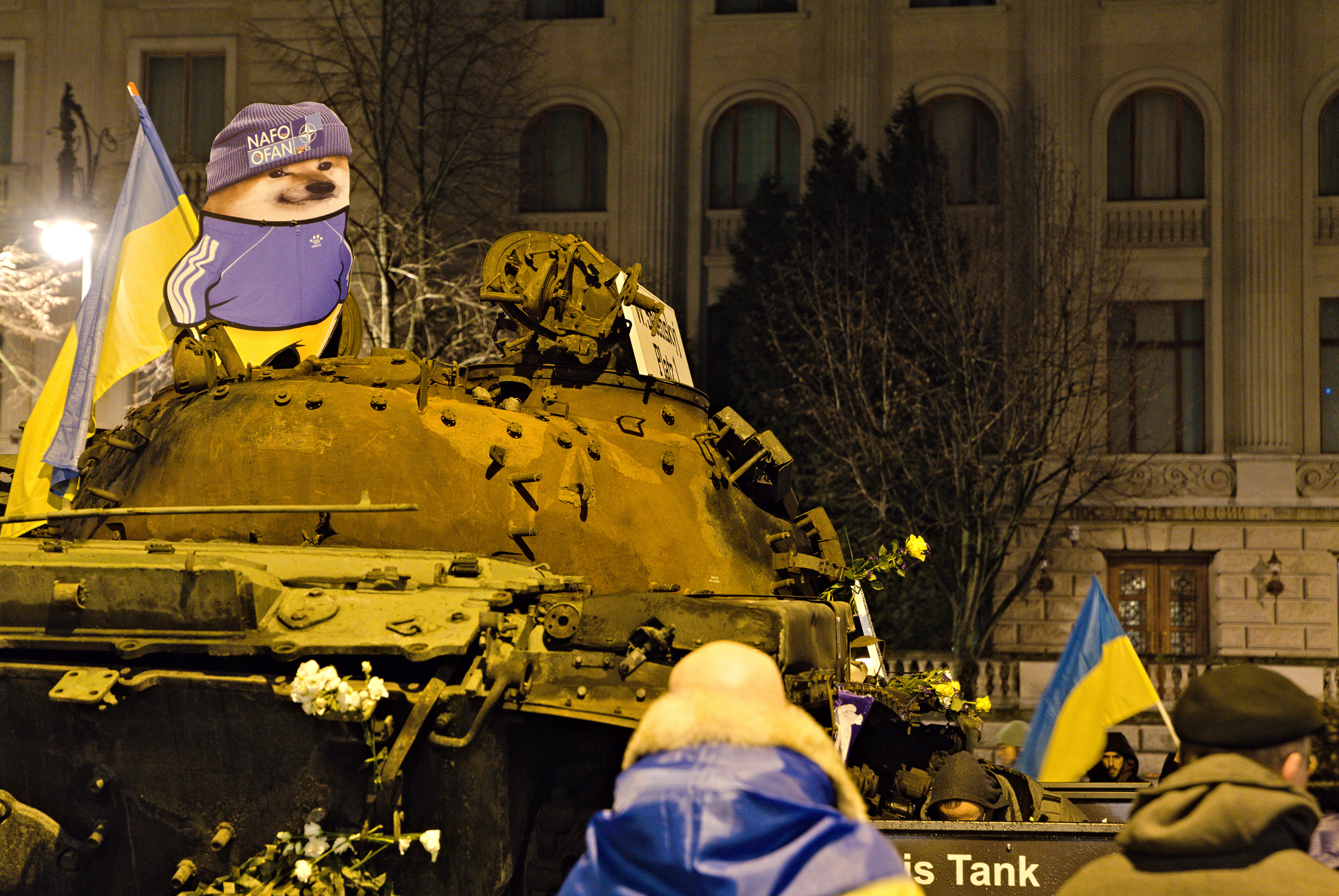
A NAFO mascot on a destroyed Russian tank displayed in front of the Russian embassy in Berlin

The United States Department of State and the European External Action Service of the European Union (EU) published guides aiming to respond to Russian disinformation. Twitter paused all ad campaigns in Ukraine and Russia in an attempt to curb misinformation spread by ads. European Commission president Ursula von der Leyen announced an EU-wide ban of Russian state-sponsored RT and Sputnik news channels on 27 February, after Poland and Estonia had done so days before.

Reddit, an American social news aggregation, content rating, and discussion website, quarantined subreddits r/Russia, the national subreddit of Russia, and r/GenZedong, a self-described "Dengist" subreddit in March 2022, after both the subreddits were spreading Russian disinformation. In the case of r/Russia, the site's administrators removed one of its moderators for spreading disinformation. Sister sub of r/Russia, r/RussiaPolitics was also quarantined for similar reasons. When the subreddits are quarantined, they do not show up in searches, recommendations and user feeds, and anyone who tries to access the quarantined subreddits would be shown a warning regarding the content, which they must acknowledge in order to access it.

In May 2022, a group calling themselves NAFO was created with the object of posting irreverent comments about the war and memes promoting Ukraine or mocking the Russian war effort and strategy using a "cartoon dog" based on the Shiba Inu. NAFO was seen by The Washington Post as having a significant impact on Russian troll farms. On 28 August 2022, the official Twitter account of the Ministry of Defence of Ukraine tweeted its appreciation of NAFO, with an image of missiles being fired and a "Fella" dressed in a combat uniform, hands on face, in a posture of appreciation.

== See also ==
- African Stream
- Cyberwarfare by Russia
- Information warfare – Battlespace use and management of information and communication technology
- Nuclear threats during the Russian invasion of Ukraine
- Panfilov's Twenty-Eight Guardsmen – WW2 example of Soviet disinformation
- Russian web brigades – Russian state-sponsored Internet commentators
- Social media in the Russo-Ukrainian War – The avenue by which much disinformation has spread
- Vulkan files leak – Leaks implicating the Russian company NTC Vulkan in acts of cybercrime
- Information war during the Russo-Georgian War
- Misinformation in the Gaza war
