= Social media in the Russo-Ukrainian war =

Social media has played a prominent role during the Russo-Ukrainian War, and especially the full-scale Russian invasion of Ukraine. It has made the war one of the most "meticulously documented" in recent history.

== Outreach by Ukraine ==
Ukrainian president Volodymyr Zelenskyy has personally used a "unique, media-friendly dynamic style" in how he communicates with the public on social media during the full-scale invasion. On 25 February 2022, shortly after the beginning of the full-scale Russian invasion, as the battle of Kyiv began with Russian forces approaching the city and false rumors spread of Zelenskyy fleeing the city, Zelenskyy posted a "defiant" video of himself with other top government leaders on the streets of Kyiv, saying "We are all here. We're in here. We are in Kyiv. We defend Ukraine." Throughout the war, Zelenskyy has continually posted low-production-value "selfie videos" on social media giving updates and speeches as an everyman, furthering his perceived authenticity and boosting Ukrainian morale.

In July 2022, Ukraine launched United24 Media (separate from the United24 fundraising platform), a cross-platform, mostly English-language outlet "to promote Ukrainian culture and debunk Russian propaganda". Valentyn Paniuta, head of the organization, described Ukraine's public outreach as a "question of [Ukrainian] survival, noting that since support for Ukraine came from Western democracies, Ukraine needed to "appeal to ordinary people" from those countries and "make them feel some kind of empathy for the Ukrainian people".

Paniuta noted that "Ukraine faced a situation where there was powerful Russian propaganda in different countries, but we didn't have any international media. We had to create it immediately, and our only weapon was viral content on social media." Marketing expert Srulik Einhorn, writing in the Jerusalem Post, called the social media campaign conducted by Ukraine during the full-scale invasion "one of the most brilliant campaigns orchestrated by countries in recent decades".

Ukrainian soldier Roman Trokhymets has gained a significant social media following after sharing his experiences in the war online, one of his videos, ″Thoughts and experiences under fire at the front″ gaining over 1.2 million views.

== Military impact ==
In the leadup to Russia's full-scale invasion of Ukraine, footage of Russian military vehicles posted to the video-sharing platform TikTok helped corroborate widespread Western claims of an impending invasion. During the invasion itself, open-source intelligence (OSINT) derived from social media footage has continued to play a large role in the conflict. The Economist wrote that this poses a "nightmare" for militaries trying to preserve operational security.

On the Ukrainian side, civilians have been able to report information about Russian troop movements through Telegram bots that channel the data back to Ukrainian military authorities. The Security Service of Ukraine have said that at least once, a tip-off had allowed them to successfully strike Russian vehicles during the Battle of Kyiv in 2022.

== Disinformation and propaganda ==
=== Russian information war against Ukraine ===
Russia has used online disinformation and propaganda to justify its war aims on social media for years, even before its 2014 annexation of Crimea and the beginning of the Russo-Ukrainian War. According to a report by NATO's Cooperative Cyber Defence Centre of Excellence, during the early stages of the war, pro-Russian social media accounts "systemically cultivated fear, anxiety, and hate" among ethnically Russian and other minority populations of Ukraine by distributing and manipulating images of supposed atrocities by Ukrainian forces. For example, during the 2014 Odesa clashes in the wider 2014 pro-Russian unrest in Ukraine, there was a viral post originally posted to Facebook - now widely considered to be a hoax - by a supposed "Igor Rosovskiy" claiming to have witnessed Ukrainian nationalists beating up other residents of the city and burning them alive, and making antisemitic threats towards Rosovskiy, an alleged emergency physician, when he tried to help the victims. Analysts later discovered that Rosovskiy's profile picture "was actually that of a dentist from the North Caucasus", leading them to conclude the story was fake. In another prominent example, the fake crucified boy story, a piece of atrocity propaganda about Ukrainian forces supposedly publicly crucifying a three-year-old boy in the eastern Ukrainian city of Sloviansk, was originally spread on Russian state TV, but spread widely on social media afterward.

In May 2014, evidence emerged about the creation of the Internet Research Agency (IRA), which hired Russians to post 100 posts a day in support of the Russian information war against Ukraine. The founder of the organization was Russian oligarch Yevgeny Prigozhin, better known as the leader of the government-affiliated paramilitary Wagner Group. It was eventually announced in July 2023 that the IRA would be dissolved, as part of larger reprisals against Prigozhin in the wake of his largely unsuccessful Wagner Group rebellion.

=== Misinformation ===
Social media has also been the source of largely spontaneous myths about the war, such as the mythical Ghost of Kyiv, a supposed Ukrainian MiG-29 Fulcrum flying ace credited with shooting down six Russian planes over Kyiv during the Kyiv offensive on 24 February 2022.

=== Countermeasures ===
Logo of NAFO

Since the beginning of the Russo-Ukrainian War in 2014, Ukraine has repeatedly urged social media corporations to do more work in countering Russian disinformation. Since the escalation in 2022, the companies have increased their efforts in this area, but some reports have indicated that these steps fell short.

The pro-Ukrainian meme group and loose social media movement NAFO ("North Atlantic Fella Organization", a play on NATO) uses online memes mocking Russian forces and propaganda to further their stated goal of countering Russian disinformation.

== Censorship ==
Since the beginning of the full-scale invasion of Ukraine, social media has been subject to increased restriction and censorship in Russia. The Russian government fully blocked Facebook on 4 March 2022, then Instagram on 11 March, after Meta, the parent company of both websites, introduced an exception to its violent speech policy to allow calls for violence against Russian soldiers in Ukraine. Russians have been investigated and sometimes sent to prison for criticizing Kremlin policies in social media posts, enabled by Russian 2022 war censorship laws.

== Telegram ==
In particular, the messaging service Telegram has played a highly important role in the information space of the war since 2022, used by both sides for messaging and information. Telegram has been popular in Russia for a long time, and was used by Volodymyr Zelenskyy's campaign in the 2019 Ukrainian presidential election. Telegram has been controversial in the past due to its lack of moderation in oversight, and this has also allowed it to be used a lot by Russian government as well as Russian opposition sources who "[found] themselves cut off from most mainstream social media."

As a result, it has become the center of new information about the war. Aric Toler, a journalist for the open-source intelligence investigation organization Bellingcat, told The Atlantic that "Almost every bit of information about the war on Twitter, [Instagram, Facebook, and others] is downstream of Telegram." Yevgeny Prigozhin, leader of the Wagner Group, used Telegram extensively to organize his June 2023 rebellion against the Russian Ministry of Defense. Telegram also played an "essential" role in helping Ukrainian refugees escape the country and get aid.

== See also ==
- Media portrayal of the Russo-Ukrainian war
- Media coverage of the Syrian civil war
- Wikipedia and the Russo-Ukrainian war

== Bibliography ==
- Lange-Ionatamishvili, Elina; Svetoka, Sanda (2015). "Strategic Communications and Social Media in the Russia Ukraine Conflict" (PDF). In Geers, Kenneth (ed.). Cyber War in Perspective: Russian Aggression against Ukraine. Tallinn: Cooperative Cyber Defence Centre of Excellence.
