= Adrien Bocquet =

Former French serviceman and Russian propagandist

- Born: Lille, France
- Military career
- Allegiance: France
- Branch: French Air Force
- Service years: 2009—2010, 2012—2013
- Known for: Spreading pro-Russian disinformation during the Russo-Ukrainian war

Adrien Bocquet is a former French military serviceman and pro-Kremlin propagandist living in Moscow. He gained notoriety in 2022 for spreading disinformation during Russia's invasion of Ukraine regarding the Bucha massacre.

== Biography ==
Adrien Bocquet was born in Lille, where he lived for 13 years. He is a former member of the French Air Force; he was injured during his training as a commando rifleman and did not complete the program, though he has misrepresented his service record. In 2010, he was injured during a military exercise, resulting in paraplegia. In 2021, he underwent surgery to have neurostimulators implanted, which enabled him to walk again. He was subsequently received by Sophie Cluzel, the Secretary of State for Persons with Disabilities. Drawing on his own experience, he wrote an autobiographical book in which he recounts how he "miraculously" learned to walk again—thanks to a revolutionary scientific technique—following a severe accident that had left him paraplegic. He promoted the book on television in May 2022.

In April 2022, shortly after the start of the Russian invasion of Ukraine, he traveled to the country, stating his purpose was to provide "humanitarian aid." Upon his return, he gave interviews—initially on André Bercoff's show on Sud Radio, then across various far-right outlets and numerous other media platforms. He alleged that he had witnessed atrocities and war crimes committed by Ukrainian soldiers, specifically members of the Azov Brigade. His accounts were widely circulated internationally and even cited by the Russian Foreign Minister. Upon verification, however, his claims were proven to be false. Russia granted him Russian citizenship, which was presented to him personally by Vladimir Putin.

He stated that he was the target of an attempted murder by the Ukrainian secret services in September 2022, allegedly due to his work as an "independent military ballistics expert" for the Russian government.

In December 2023, following the election of Miss France 2024, Bocquet was accused of body-shaming the winner, Ève Gilles, stating in reference to Gilles that "a woman should have curves."

Bocquet has continued to travel to the occupied regions of the Donbas and founded his own self-proclaimed "independent" media outlet, for which he serves as a war correspondent. While stating he specializes in the Russo-Ukrainian War, he has also stated that he has been active "in Iraq, Mali, Niger, Kazakhstan, and Armenia." He has also worked for Afrique Média—a Russian propaganda outlet operating in Africa,—and has stated he was employed by a news agency recently established in Serbia.

In March 2026, Bocquet was sanctioned by the European Union for his involvement in disinformation and pro-Russian propaganda activities.

== Disinformation activities ==
Bocquet recounts various scenes—all in the vicinity of Bucha—which he claims to have witnessed firsthand. He asserts that members of the Azov Battalion, whom he claims to have been with, "systematically shot Russian prisoners of war in the legs" before executing Russian officers. He further alleges that one of these individuals prevented medics from providing aid to wounded Russians on the side of a road, subsequently finishing them off. Bocquet also claims that an American television network misrepresented Ukrainian mortar fire as Russian bombardment. In media appearances, he describes himself as an eyewitness who saw, filmed, and photographed these acts of abuse, yet did not provide any footage or images of them. The images he did provide confirmed that he travelled to Ukraine, but only to the Lviv region, near the Polish border—and the dates did not align with his accounts. Throughout various interviews, Bocquet contradicted himself and retracted several of his earlier claims. He also produced a photomontage intended to create the impression that he had visited Kyiv during his brief stay in Ukraine.

Although these falsehoods have been refuted by various sources and investigations, they have nonetheless been co-opted by Kremlin propaganda to accuse Ukrainian forces of war crimes and to argue that Russia's invasion of Ukraine was beneficial. Meanwhile, Bocquet has disappeared from mainstream French media. He was subsequently invited onto Russian state news channels and traveled to Russia in July 2022, where media outlets claimed that he was being persecuted in France. He has appeared on the program Vremya, where he has echoed Kremlin propaganda by invoking the "denazification" of Ukraine—he has also appeared on Sputnik.

Bocquet, alongside other pro-Kremlin propagandists, participates in the "International Public Tribunal for Ukraine"—a Russian body whose stated objective is to "collect data and prove the commission of war crimes by the Kyiv regime," but is described by disinformation experts as actually serving as a propaganda exercise aimed at "diverting attention from the abundant evidence of war crimes committed by Russian forces"—and takes part in disinformation operations in support of the Kremlin.

According to Maxime Audinet, a researcher specializing in Russian influence, French individuals such as Bocquet "serve to launder Russian propaganda", further writing: "A French citizen defending positions that could be described as pro-Kremlin may be perceived as more credible than a propagandist from a Russian state-owned media outlet".

== See also ==
- Disinformation in the Russo-Ukrainian war
