= War on Fakes =

Russian fake news website

- Website type: Fake news website
- Available in: Russian (Telegram channels); English, French, German, Spanish, Chinese, Arabic (site)
- Founded: 23 February 2022
- Owner: Timofey Vasiliev
- Website: waronfakes.com
- Users: 766,000 (January 2023)

War on Fakes is a Russian fake news website and associated Telegram channels which claim to fact-check news about the Russian invasion of Ukraine. It has been identified as a purveyor of Russian propaganda and disinformation about the invasion.

War on Fakes has been flagged as problematic by the International Fact-Checking Network (IFCN), as all of the content required to demonstrate transparency in their operations was missing and did not disclose their funding sources and their owners were not listed or findable.

== History ==
According to the Atlantic Council's Digital Forensic Research (DFR) Lab, the War on Fakes website's original Russian version and Telegram channel were registered on 23 February 2022, the day before the invasion of Ukraine. The English website was registered on 1 March. As of 9 March, the Telegram channel had over 625,000 subscribers and was one of the most viewed Telegram channels in Russia, with over 30 million views.

A March 2023 investigation by Logically, a British disinformation analysis organisation, found that Timofey Vasiliev, a former Russian journalist, is behind War on Fakes. Vasiliev previously worked as a "citizen journalist" for various pro-Kremlin news organisations. Its English website was seized by the United States Department of Justice. Since then, only Russian-language version of the website войнасфейками.рф is still operating.

== Disinformation ==
A review of the website's purported fact checks by PolitiFact in August 2022 found that they were pieces of disinformation that relied on well-known techniques used in Russian propaganda to confuse readers trying to learn about the war in Ukraine. In February 2023, Roman Osadchuk of the Atlantic Council's DFR Lab said that War on Fakes had "become a powerhouse of spreading false debunks", adding, "It works primarily because fact-checking usually serves for readers as an 'authoritative' source to seek 'objective information.'" War on Fakes has been promoted by the Russian government on its social media accounts, and by Russian state media outlet RT.
