= African Stream =

African media outlet

- Website type: News
- Available in: English
- Headquarters: Nairobi, {{{location_country}}}
- Country of origin: Kenya
- Website: africanstream.media

African Stream is a Nairobi-based online media outlet that presents itself as a "Pan-African digital media platform covering affairs concerning Africans at home and in the diaspora", though it is accused of being a front for Russian disinformation operations.

== Background ==
African Stream has been active on the social media platforms TikTok, Reddit, YouTube, Meta, and X (formerly Twitter). YouTube and Meta banned African Stream in September 2024, in addition to the Russian state media outlet RT, following allegations from the United States State Department that African Stream is secretly managed by RT as part of a broader covert Russian government influence operation. A June 2024 report from Onyx Impact, a nonprofit organization that seeks to combat disinformation in the U.S., had previously identified African Stream as one of several foreign actors attempting to influence U.S. political discourse. African Stream denies such allegations and claims to be an independent outlet that presents its content from an authentic African perspective.

Researchers at the Stanford Internet Observatory note that African Stream shares characteristics with past covert Russian social media influence operations, such as frequently reposting content from other sources, promoting narratives about Africa and the U.S. that align with previous Russian influence operations, and outsourcing its operations to an individual with regional expertise–identified in this case as Ahmed Kaballo, a Sudanese-British journalist with ties to the Iranian state-owned media network Press TV. Kaballo describes the goal of the platform as bringing African news with an anti-imperialist perspective to a global audience. In a 2023 interview with CNBC Africa, Kaballo described the goal of the outlet as providing "cutting-edge African-centered content" to both Africans and a global audience through social media channels. The Stanford Internet Observatory describes African Stream as often promoting "pro-Russian and anti-American/Western narratives with only very weak connections to Africa".

In June, 2025, the outlet announced it would shut down as of July 1, citing the deplatforming of its social media accounts from Meta, Google, and TikTok that made its financial survival impossible.
