= Roman Trokhymets =

Ukrainian soldier (born 1993)

- Born: 1993 (age 32–33)
- Military career
- Allegiance: Ukrainian Armed Forces
- Service years: 2022–present
- Rank: Sergeant
- Conflicts: Russo-Ukrainian War; War in Donbas; Russian invasion of Ukraine; Kyiv offensive; Battle of Bakhmut

Roman Trokhymets (born 1993) is a Ukrainian soldier and media personality. In 2014, when pro-Russian separatists attacked Donbas, Trokhymets volunteered to fight in the Azov Regiment. Working as a real estate agent in 2022, he joined the Ukrainian Armed Forces after the full scale Russian invasion of Ukraine.

While fighting in the war, he started to share his experiences on social media, gaining tens of thousands of followers across different platforms, with one of his videos ″Thoughts and experiences under fire at the front″ gaining over 1.2 million views. In 2023, the following he gained from his social media activity had the newspaper Blick dub him the ″social media star among Ukrainian fighters″.

In the Armed Forces, Trokhymets is a sniper with the rank of sergeant.

== Personal life ==
Trokhymets was present during the Russian 2023 Kramatorsk restaurant missile strike, which killed 13 civilians seated around him. At the time he was on medical leave and visiting the restaurant with his sister and a friend. Following the attack, Trokhymets has received trauma related mental health treatment.
