= Great Game =

19th-century Anglo-Russian confrontation

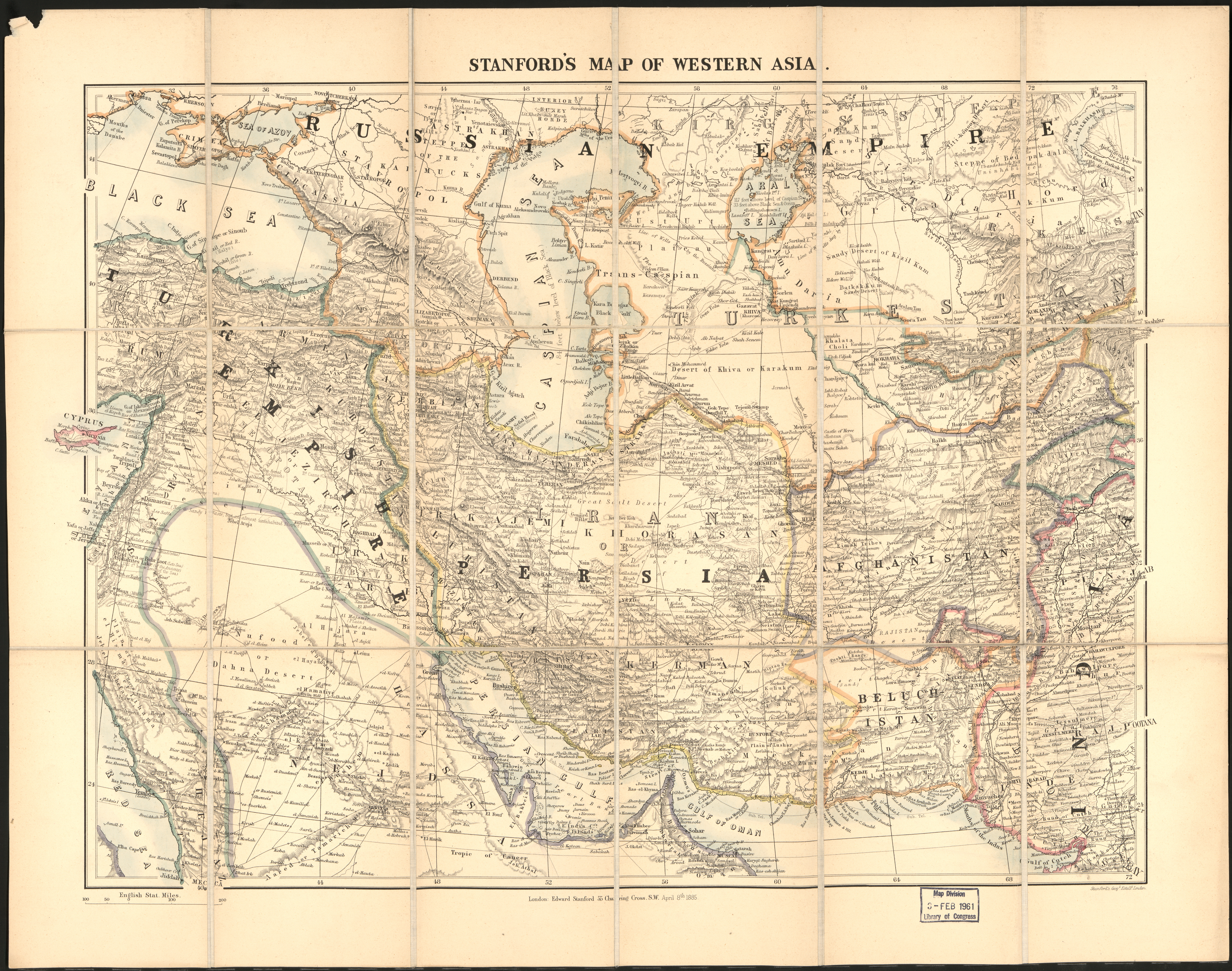
1885 British map of Western Asia during the Great Game, with the Russian and Ottoman Empires, Qajar Iran, the southern fringes of Russian Turkestan, Afghanistan and western India

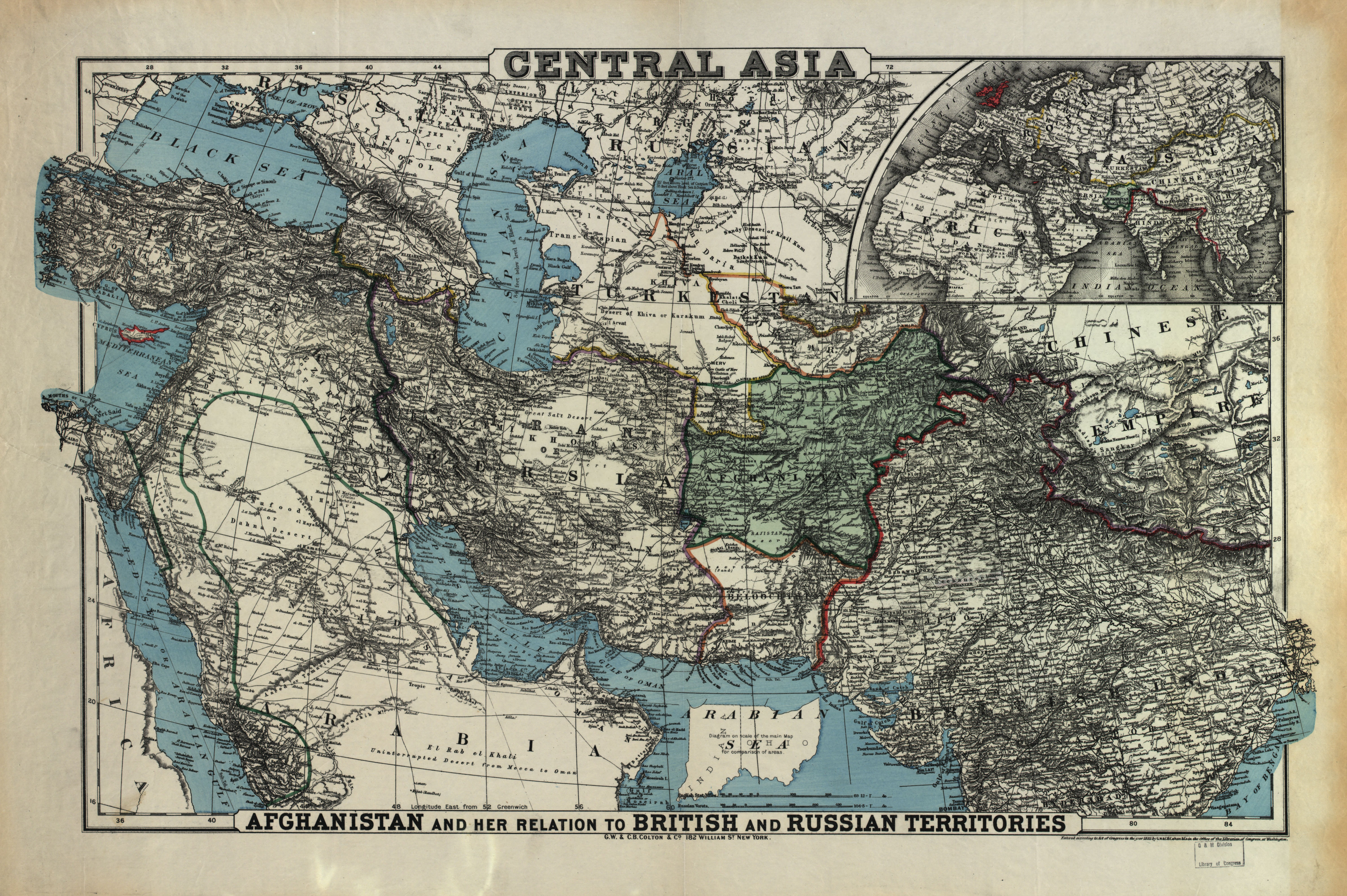
"Afghanistan and her relation to British and Russian territories", 1885 American map of Central Asia, Afghanistan, and British and Russian territories

The Great Game (Russian: Большая игра, romanized: Bolshaya igra) was a rivalry between the 19th-century British and Russian empires over influence in Central Asia, primarily in Afghanistan, Persia, and Tibet. The two colonial empires used military interventions and diplomatic negotiations to acquire and redefine territories in Central and South Asia. Russia conquered Turkestan, and Britain expanded and set the borders of British India. By the early 20th century, a line of independent states, tribes, and monarchies from the shore of the Caspian Sea to the Eastern Himalayas were made into protectorates and territories of the two empires.

Though the Great Game was marked by distrust, diplomatic intrigue, and regional wars, it never erupted into a full-scale war directly between Russian and British colonial forces. However, the two nations battled in the Crimean War from 1853 to 1856, which affected the Great Game. The Russian and British Empires also cooperated numerous times during the Great Game, including many treaties and the Afghan Boundary Commission.

Britain feared Russia's southward expansion would threaten India, while Russia feared the expansion of British interests into Central Asia. As a result, Britain made it a high priority to protect all approaches to India, while Russia continued its military conquest of Central Asia. Aware of the importance of India to the British, Russian efforts in the region often had the aim of extorting concessions from them in Europe, but after 1901, they had no serious intention of directly attacking India. Russian war plans for India that were proposed but never materialised included the Duhamel and Khrulev plans of the Crimean War (1853–1856).

Russia and Britain's 19th-century rivalry in Asia began with the planned Indian March of Paul and Russian invasions of Iran in 1804–1813 and 1826–1828, shuffling Persia into a competition between colonial powers. According to one major view, the Great Game started on 12 January 1830, when Lord Ellenborough, the president of the Board of Control for India, tasked Lord Bentinck, the governor-general, with establishing a trade route to the Emirate of Bukhara. Britain aimed to create a protectorate in Afghanistan, and support the Ottoman Empire, Persia, Khiva, and Bukhara as buffer states against Russian expansion. This would protect India and key British sea trade routes by blocking Russia from gaining a port on the Persian Gulf or the Indian Ocean. As Russian and British spheres of influence expanded and competed, Russia proposed Afghanistan as the neutral zone.

Traditionally, the Great Game came to a close between 1895 and 1907. In September 1895, London and Saint Petersburg signed the Pamir Boundary Commission protocols, when the border between Afghanistan and the Russian Empire was defined using diplomatic methods. In August 1907, the Anglo-Russian Convention created an alliance between Britain and Russia, and formally delineated control in Afghanistan, Persia, and Tibet.

== Name ==
The phrase "the Great Game" was used well before the 19th century and was associated with games of risk, such as cards and dice. The French equivalent le grand jeu dates back to at least 1585 and is associated with meanings of risk, chance and deception.

The term Great Game was coined in 1840 by a British intelligence officer Captain Arthur Conolly (1807–1842). Rudyard Kipling's 1901 novel Kim popularized the term, increasing its association with great power rivalry. It became even more popular after the 1979 advent of the Soviet–Afghan War.

In the historical sense, the term dates from the mid-19th century. Captain Conolly had been appointed as a political officer. A similar term, the "Tournament of Shadows" (Russian: Война теней, romanized: Voyna teney) was reportedly used by Russian diplomat Karl Nesselrode. In July 1840, in correspondence to Major Henry Rawlinson who had been recently appointed as the new political agent in Kandahar, Conolly wrote, "You've a great game, a noble game, before you." Conolly believed that Rawlinson's new post gave him the opportunity to advance humanitarianism in Afghanistan, and summed up his hopes:

If the British Government would only play the grand game – help Russia cordially to all that she has a right to expect – shake hands with Persia – get her all possible amends from Oosbegs – force the Bukhara Amir to be just to us, the Afghans, and other Oosbeg states, and his own kingdom – but why go on; you know my, at any rate in one sense, enlarged views. The expediency, nay the necessity of them will be seen, and we shall play the noble part that the first Christian nation of the world ought to fill.

It was introduced into the mainstream by the British novelist Rudyard Kipling in his novel Kim (1901). It was first used academically by Professor H.W.C. Davis in a presentation titled The Great Game in Asia (1800–1844) on 10 November 1926. The use of the term "The Great Game" to describe Anglo-Russian rivalry in Central Asia became common only after the Second World War.

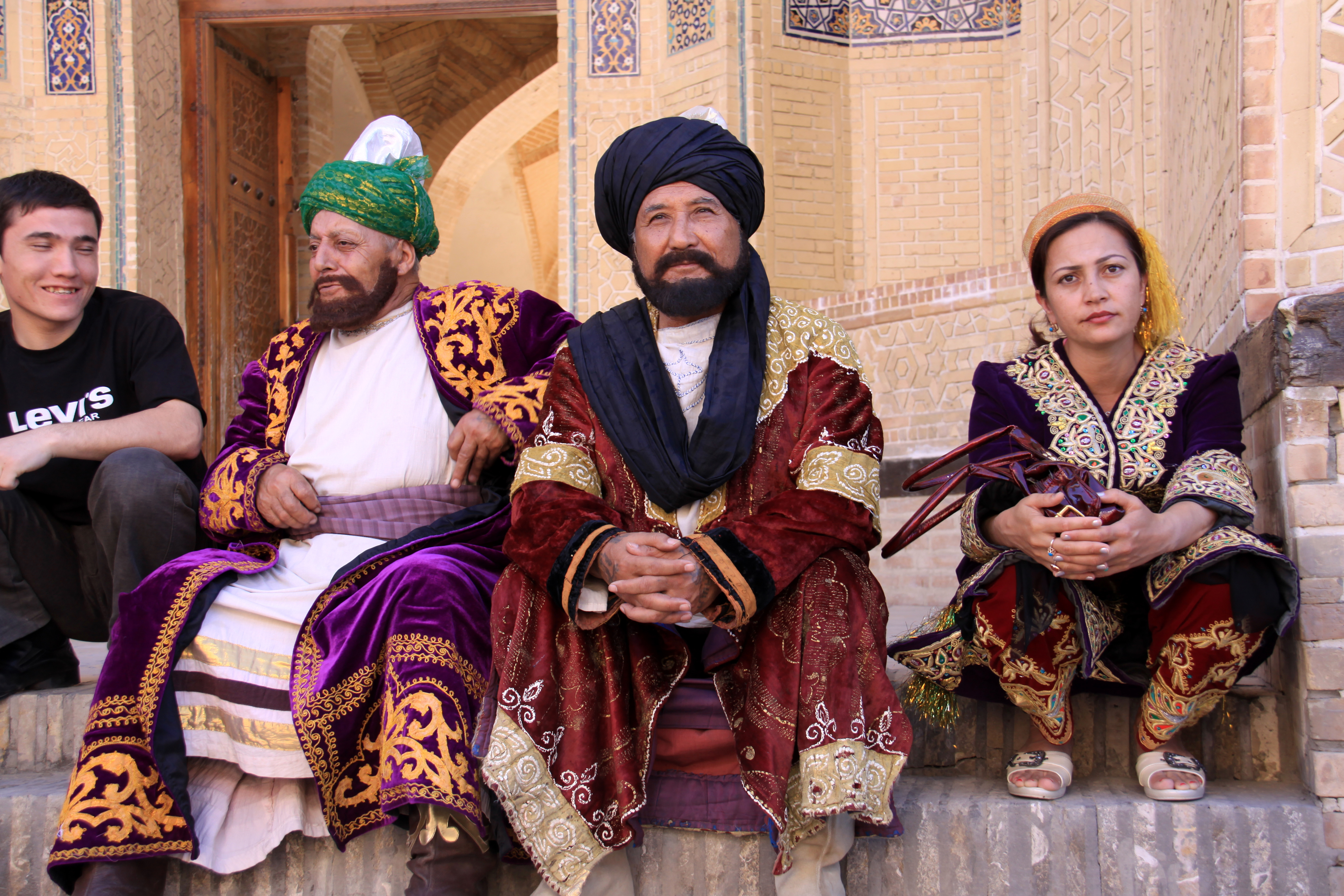
Silk and spice festival in modern-day Bukhara, Uzbekistan

== First signs of possible India invasion ==
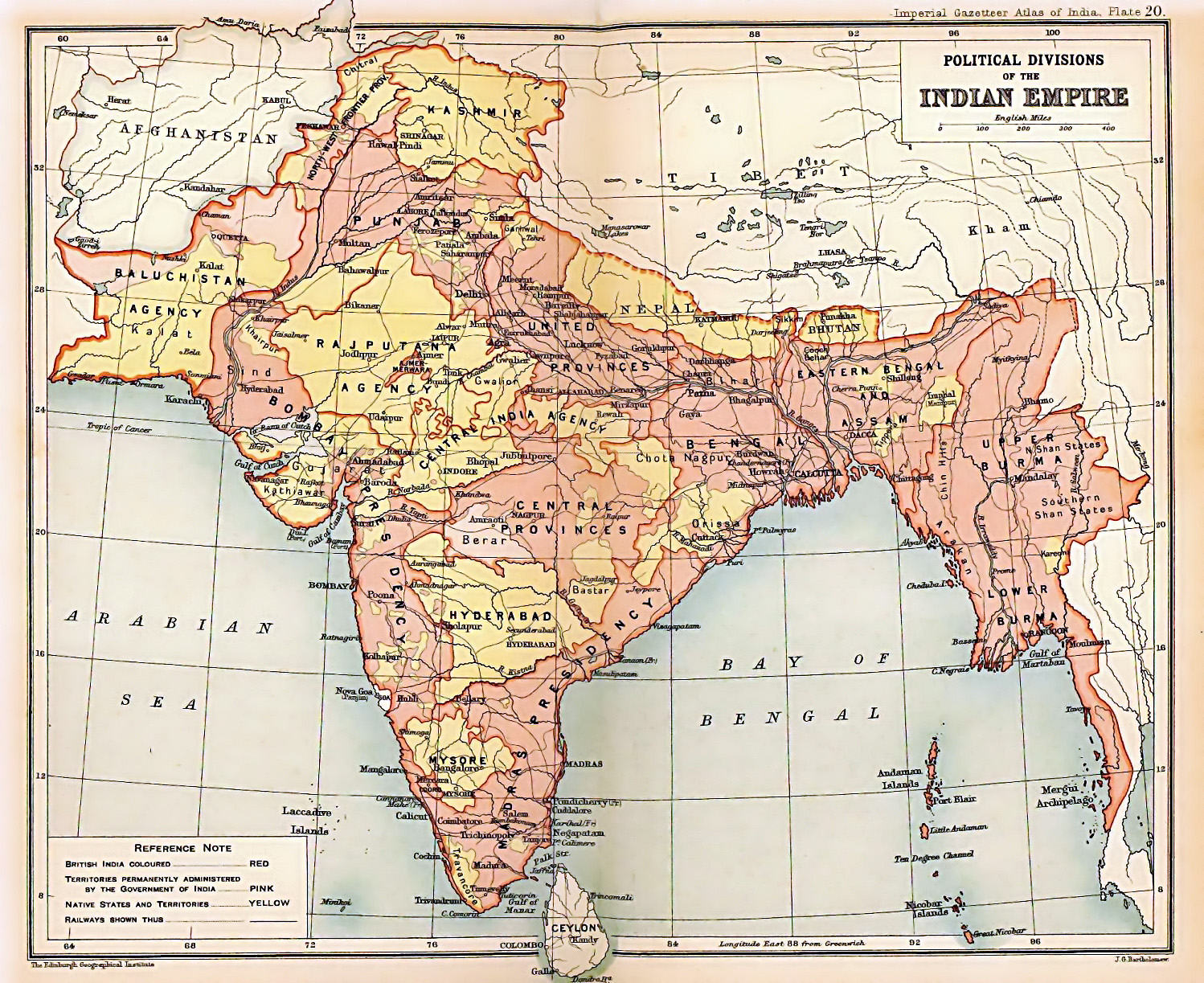
1909 map of the British Indian Empire, showing British India in two shades of pink and the princely states in yellow

At the start of the 19th century, the Indian subcontinent was ruled in part by independent princely states and in part by the company rule of the British East India Company. During the 19th century, a political and diplomatic confrontation developed between Britain and Russia over Afghanistan which would become known as The Great Game. Russia's foreign policy was driven by the perspective that Britain would develop and control commercial and military inroads into Central Asia, and Britain's foreign policy was based on expectations of Russia adding the "jewel in the crown", India, to the vast empire that Russia was building in Asia. This resulted in an atmosphere of distrust and the constant threat of war between the two empires. If Russia were to gain control of the Emirate of Afghanistan, it might then be used as a staging post for a Russian invasion of India, was the British line of thinking.

Napoleon had proposed a joint Franco-Russian invasion of India to Tsar Paul I of Russia. Expecting a future action by the British against Russia and her allies in Europe, Paul decided in 1801 to make the first move towards where he believed the British Empire was weakest (Indian March of Paul). He wrote to the Ataman of the Don Cossacks Troops, Cavalry General Vasily Petrovich Orlov, directing him to march to Orenburg, conquer the Central Asian khanates, and from there invade India. Paul was assassinated in the same year, and the invasion was terminated.

Historian Peter Hopkirk wrote that Tsar Paul had not been able to obtain a detailed map of India until the Cossacks' departure from Orenburg. He quotes the Tsar as instructing Orlov: "My maps only go as far as Khiva and the River Oxus. Beyond these points it is your affair to gain information about the possessions of the English, and the condition of the native population subject to their rule". The British public learned about the incident years later, but it firmly imprinted on the popular consciousness, contributing to feelings of mutual suspicion and distrust associated with the Great Game. Hugh Seton-Watson observed that "the grotesque plan had no military significance, but at least showed its author's state of mind". Hopkirk remarked that "no serious thought or study has been given to this wild adventure".

Napoleon tried to persuade Paul's son, Tsar Alexander I of Russia, to invade India; however Alexander resisted. In 1807, Napoleon dispatched General Claude Matthieu, Count Gardane on a French military mission to Persia, with the intention of persuading Russia to invade India. In response, Britain sent its own diplomatic missions in 1808, with military advisers, to Persia and Afghanistan under the capable Mountstuart Elphinstone, averting the possible French and Russian threat to India. However, Britain was left with concerns about being able to defend its colony on the subcontinent. At the time, Russia also went to war with Qajar Iran and invaded the Persian Caucasus from 1804 to 1813, adding to Britain's fears, while Russia was distracted mainly by the Napoleonic Wars.

In 1810, British Lieutenant Henry Pottinger and Captain Charles Christie undertook an expedition from Nushki (Balochistan) to Isfahan (Central Persia) disguised as Muslims. The expedition was funded by the East India Company and was to map and research the regions of "Beloochistan" (Balochistan) and Persia because of concerns about India being invaded by French forces from that direction. After the disastrous French invasion of Russia in 1812 and the collapse of the French army, the threat of a French invasion through Persia was removed.

The shah of Iran, Fath-Ali Shah Qajar would become part of diplomatic intrigues about India. He first received limited British support in 1801 that was canceled after Russia's invasion of Persia in 1804. Fath-Ali then lent a promise to Napoleon in 1807 to theoretically invade British India in exchange for French military assistance (Gardane's mission) which fell through despite the Treaty of Finckenstein in 1807. When France allied with Russia at Tilsit in 1807, as Russia was still invading Iran, Fath-Ali Shah turned toward British diplomacy and alliance in 1809. The shah was also able to use a rivalry between the East India Company and the British Foreign Office, to garner more British aid. In the 1809 preliminary Treaty of Tehran, Persia agreed to stop any European or foreign army passing to India, while the British agreed to send a mission to train sixteen thousand Persian soldiers and, if Qajar Persia was invaded by a European state, pay a £100,000 subsidy to Persia, while attempting to mediate if at peace with Persia's enemy. Nevertheless, Russia would end up defeating Iran a few years later, with Britain mediating the treaty.

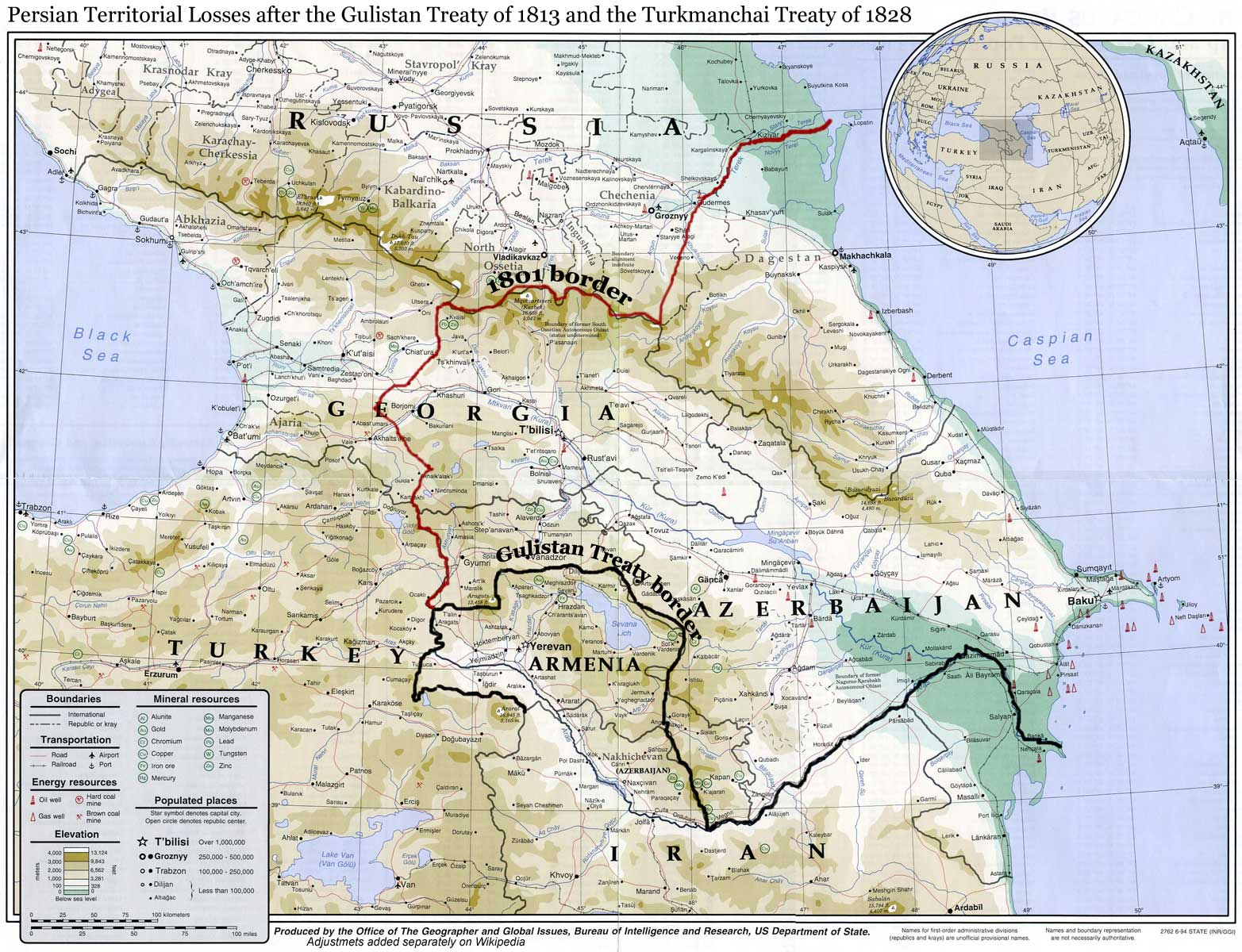
Map of Qajar Iran losses to Russian Empire in 1813 and 1828

The Russo-Persian Wars began to coalesce into a point of tension between the British and Russian empires, particularly following the Treaty of Gulistan in 1813, which gave the Russian Empire the theoretical right to intervene in Persia at any time, a humiliation of Persia. Fath-Ali Shah sought to counterbalance Russia by increasing the ties between the Qajars and Britain; the British offered military and financial assistance to the shah, supporting Iran as a buffer between Russia and India. The Russian invasion of Iran in 1826–1828 led to a Russian victory, weakening Qajar Iran which retained only minimal influence and power. This fully placed Persia into another colonial contest between Russia and Britain.

== Beginnings ==
=== Britain's perspective ===
Map of the Indus River basin today. Britain's intended strategy was to use its steam power and the river as a trade route into Central Asia.

The Great Game is said to have begun on 12 January 1830 when Lord Ellenborough, the president of the Board of Control for India tasked Lord William Bentinck, the Governor-General of India, to establish a new trade route to Bukhara.

Following the Treaty of Turkmenchay (1828) and the Treaty of Adrianople (1829), Britain expected that Persia and the Ottoman Empire (Turkey) would be forced to become protectorates of Russia. This would change Britain's perception of the world, and its response was The Great Game. Britain had no intention of getting involved in the Middle East, but it did envision a series of buffer states between the British and Russian Empires that included Turkey, Persia, plus the Khanate of Khiva and the Khanate of Bukhara that would grow from future trade. Behind these buffer states would be their protected states stretching from the Persian Gulf to India and up into the Emirate of Afghanistan, with British sea-power protecting trade sea-lanes. Access to Afghanistan was to be through developing trade routes along the Indus and Sutlej rivers using steam-powered boats, and therefore access through the Sind and Punjab regions would be required. Persia would have to give up its claim on Herat in Afghanistan. Afghanistan would need to be transformed from a group of warring principalities into one state ruled by an ally whose foreign relations would be conducted on his behalf by the Governor-General and the Foreign Office. The Great Game meant closer ties between Britain and the states along her northwest frontier.

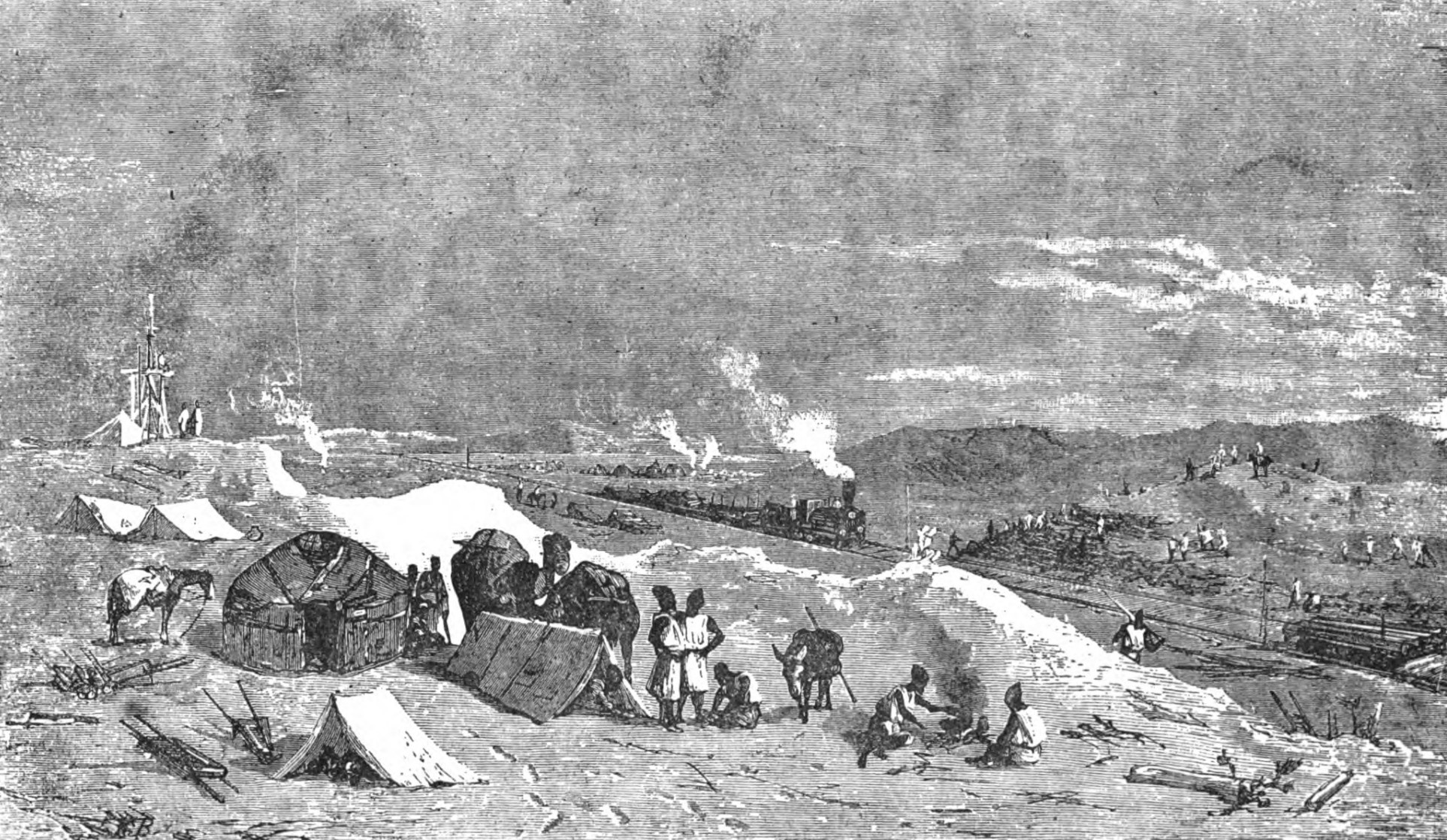
Russians constructing the Trans-Caspian Railway, from the Black Sea across Merv to Herat and India, drawing by Charles Thomas Marvin (1854–1890)

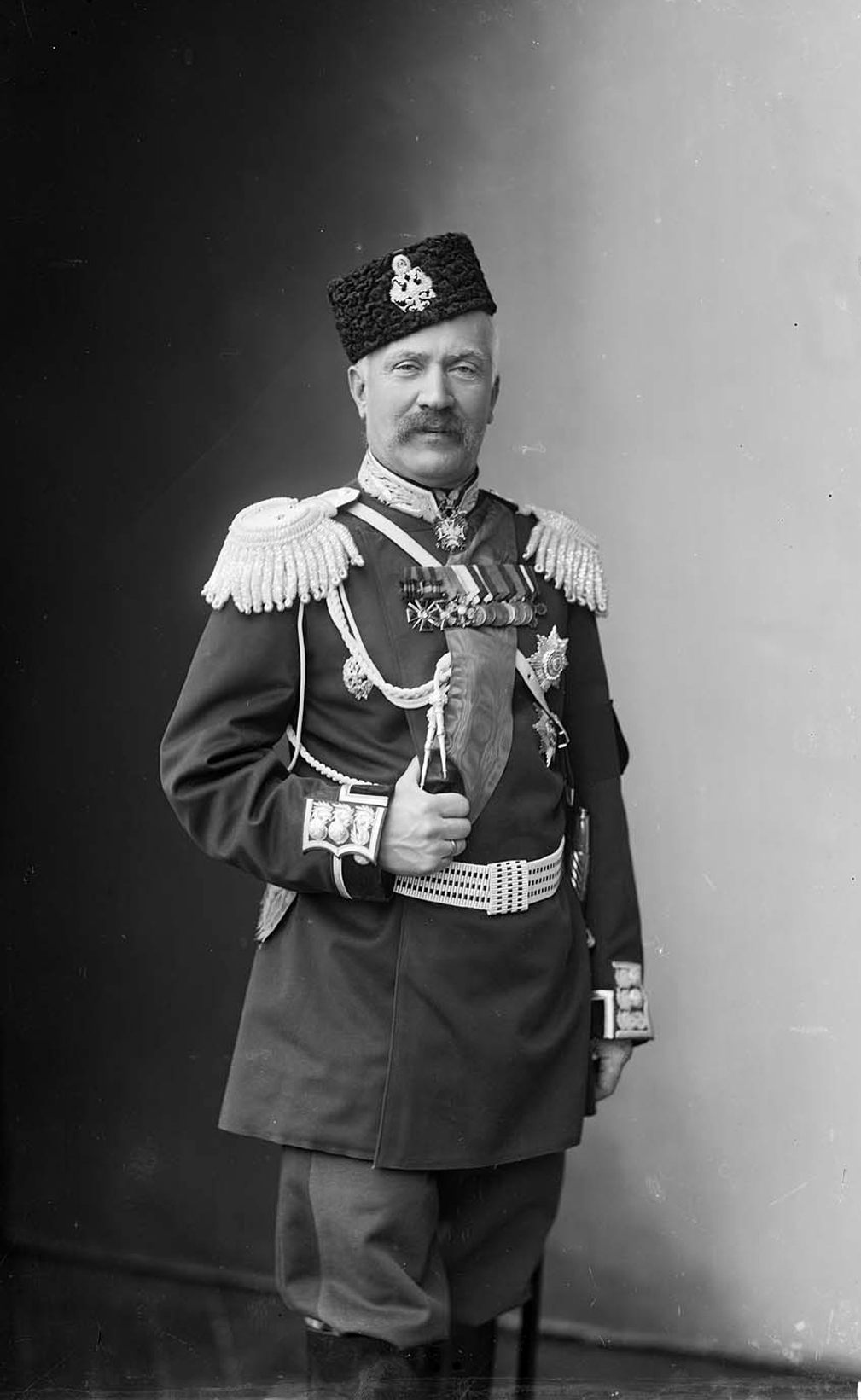
General Mikhaïl Annenkov in Paris, 1891, supervisor of Russo-Indian railway operation

Britain believed that it was the world's first free society and the most industrially advanced country, and therefore that it had a duty to use its iron, steam power, and cotton goods to take over Central Asia and develop it. British goods were to be followed by British values and the respect for private property. With pay for work and security in place, nomads would settle and become tribal herdsman surrounding oasis cities. These were to develop into modern states with agreed borders, as in the European model. Therefore, lines needed to be agreed and drawn on maps. Morgan says that two proud and expanding empires approached each other, without any agreed frontier, from opposite directions over a "backward, uncivilized and undeveloped region."

Here we are, just as we were, snarling at each other, hating each other, but neither wishing for war. – Lord Palmerston (1835)

American historian David Fromkin argues that by the mid-19th century the British had developed at least nine reasons to expect a major war with Russia unless Russian expansion in Asia could be stopped:

1. Expansion would upset the balance of power by making Russia too powerful.
2. Sooner or later Russia will invade India.
3. Russian success would encourage anti-colonial elements in India to revolt.
4. It would undermine the old Islamic regimes of Central Asia leading to a frantic war among the powers for shares of the spoils.
5. It would add power and prestige to the Russian regime that was the great enemy of political freedom.
6. The British people hated and feared Russia and demanded a pushing back.
7. It could disrupt the established British trade with Asia.
8. It would strengthen protectionism and thereby undermine the free trading ideal that Britain was committed to.
9. When Russia reached the Indian Ocean it could threaten the naval communications that held the British Empire together.
10. By the late 19th century London added the argument that Russian success against the Ottoman Empire would seriously embarrass Britain's reputation for diplomatic prowess.
11. And finally petroleum deposits in Central Asia were discovered in the early 20th century. This oil was essential to the modernization of the Royal Navy, and to build Britain's economy.

In the early 1880s, Russia failed to float a 9 million roubles loan on the European markets for its strategic geopolitical enterprises, driving severe budget cuts by the Minister of Finance. For the construction of the Russo-Indian railway however, an operation supervised by renowned engineer General Mikhail Annenkov, funding had been freely furnished.

The Tsar also entered into agreements about delivery of munition for its fortresses at an estimated value of one million sterling, with German steel magnate Alfred Krupp, being the arms manufacturer for the German Empire.

=== Russia's perspective ===
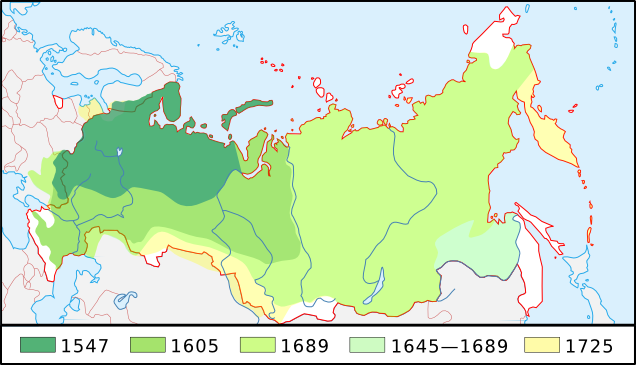
Russian expansion 1547–1725

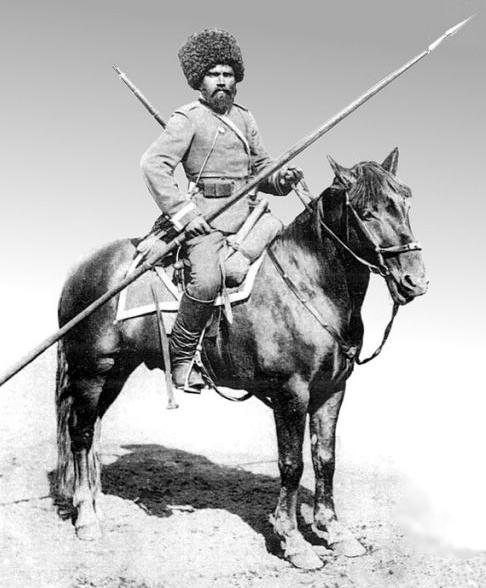
Siberian Cossack c. 1890s

In 1557, Bukhara and Khiva sent ambassadors to Ivan IV seeking permission to trade in Russia. Russia had an interest in establishing a trade route from Moscow to India. From then until the mid-19th century, Russian ambassadors to the region spent much of their time trying to free Russians who had been taken as slaves by the khanates. Russia would later expand across Siberia to the Far East, where it reached the Pacific port that would become known as Vladivostok by 1859. This eastward expansion was of no concern to the British Foreign Office because this area did not lie across any British trade routes or destinations, and therefore was of no interest to Britain.

Beginning in the 1820s, Russian troops would begin to advance southward from Siberia in search of secure boundaries and reliable neighbors. This advance would not cease until Russia's frontiers and her sphere of influence were firm in the Central Asia, and this would include Bukhara and Khiva. Between 1824 and 1854, Russia occupied the entire Kazakh Khanate (modern-day Kazakhstan). This raised Russo-Khivan tensions in addition to Khiva's legal discrimination of Russian merchants who were just beginning to penetrate Central Asia, and the ongoing issue of Russian slaves. Russia launched an attack in 1839–1840 but it failed to reach Khiva because of the tough terrain and weather. However, the khan of Khiva feared a further Russian assault and released a number of Russian slaves.

During the 1840s and 1850s, Russia's aims in Central Asia were for Bukhara and Khiva to refrain from hostile actions against Russia, cease possession of Russian slaves and the granting of asylum to Kazakhs fleeing from Russian justice. Khiva must cease her attacks on caravans along the Syr Darya. Russian merchants must be allowed to trade on the same terms as native merchants in Bukhara and Khiva. The khanates must guarantee the safety of the persons and property of Russian merchants, levy no excessive duties, permit unhampered transit of goods and caravans across Central Asia into neighboring states and allow Russian commercial agents to reside in Bukhara and Khiva, and free navigation on the Amu Darya river for Russian ships. None of these aims was realised. Russia's borders remained insecure and in addition there was growing British influence in the region.

In 1869, when British diplomat Clarendon proposed the Amu Darya river as the basis for a neutral zone between British and Russian spheres of influence, Alexander Gorchakov proposed Afghanistan as the neutral zone. Russia feared the influence that a Muslim power with British support might have on the other khanates in the region.

The Russian Empire sought to expand its access to strategic coastlines such as the Black Sea, Persian Gulf, and the Pacific. Russian war plans against British India were developed during the Crimean War, presented to the Tsar in 1854 and 1855. These were the Duhamel plan and Khrulev plan. According to historian Evgeny Sergeev, the Great Game represented a great power competition that did not initiate only with Russia's defeat in the Crimean War in 1856, but was already well underway and was only intensified thereafter. Expansion into Central Asia was closely connected with ambitions in India. Historian Alexandre Andreyev argued that the rapid advance of the Russian Empire in Central Asia, while mainly serving to extend the southern frontier, was aimed to keep British eyes off of the January uprising in Poland. Andreyev states that, as late as 1909, strategists of the Russian Empire sought to use Afghanistan to "threaten India... to exert influence on Britain", quoting Andrei Snesarev. According to diplomatic historian Barbara Jelavich, it was logistically not possible for the Russian Empire to invade India and was not seriously considered, however the Tsars understood that making invasion plans threatening the "jewel" of Britain's empire was a way to extract more favorable outcomes in Europe.

Similarly to the British Empire, the Russian Empire saw themselves as a "civilizing power" expanding a purely humanitarian mission among the Turcomans into what they perceived a "semi-barbarous" region, reflecting the ideology of the time.

== Early explorations and accounts ==
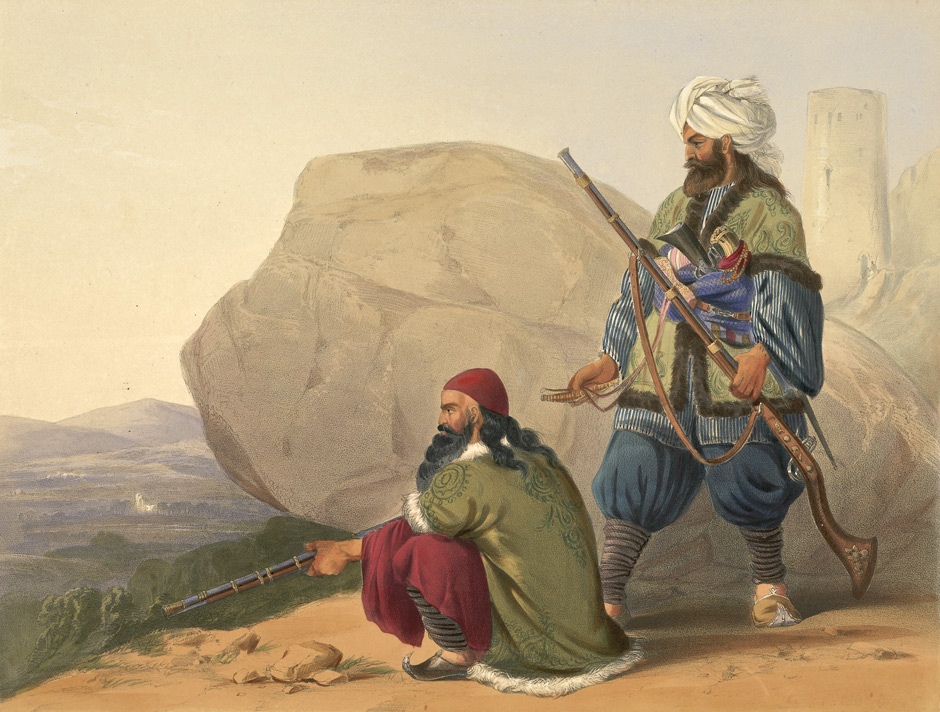
Afghan foot soldiers in British regiment called the Rangers, lithograph taken by James Rattray (1841)

=== East India Company ===
In 1782, George Forster, a civil servant of the East India Company, undertook a journey that began in Calcutta, Bengal and passed through Kashmir, Afghanistan, Herat, Khorassan, Mazanderan, crossed the Caspian Sea by ship, and then travelled to Baku, Astrakhan, Moscow, St Petersburg and then by ship to London. Forster's detailed description of the journey was published in 1798.

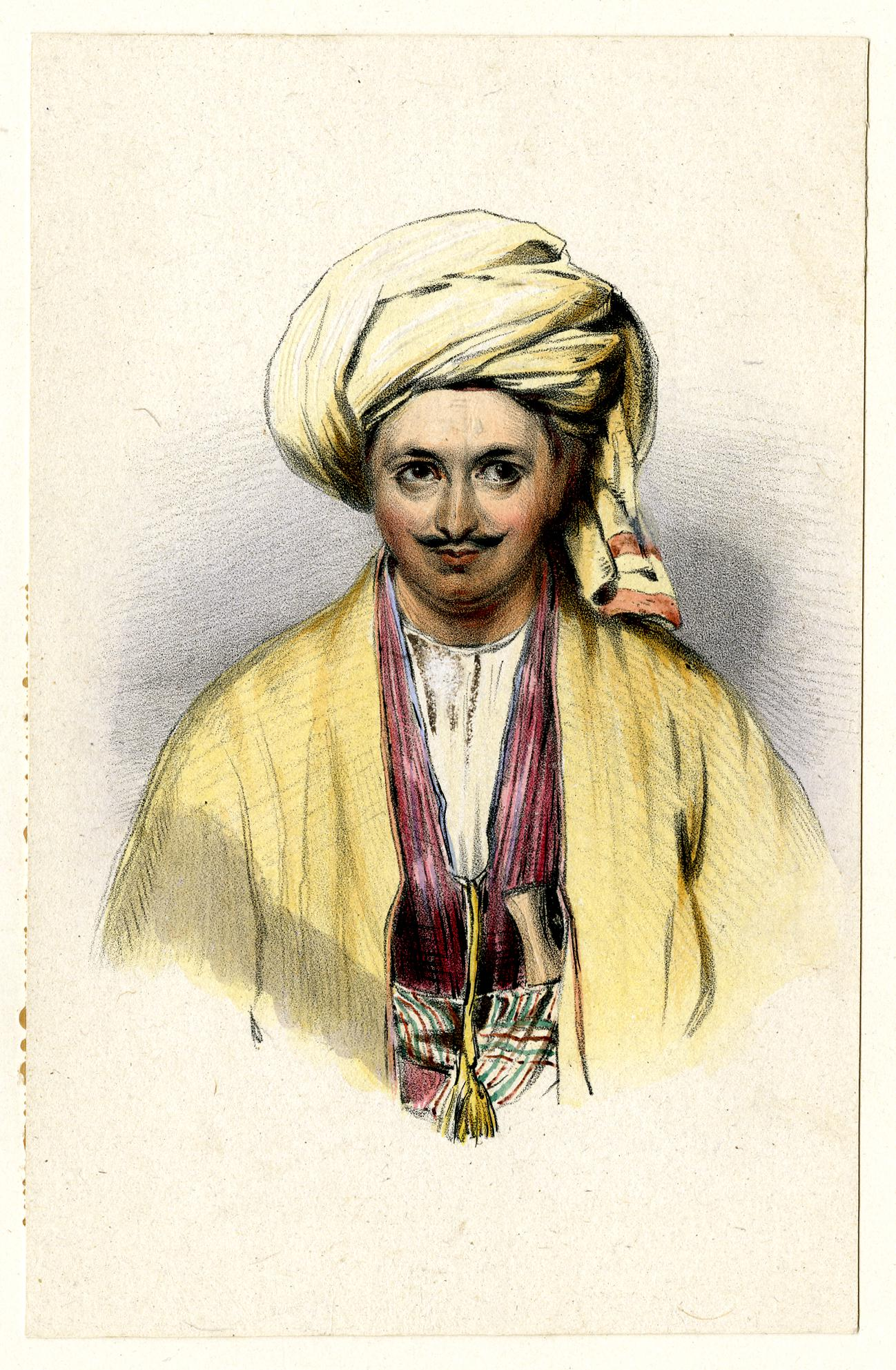
British military officer associated with the Great Game, Alexander Burnes (1805–1841)

William Moorcroft was an explorer, doctor, veterinary surgeon, and Superintendent of the East India Company's horse stud. He had an interest in expanding trade in Central Asia, where he thought the Russian traders were already active. In 1820, Moorcroft, George Trebeck and George Guthrie left India for Bukhara to buy Turkoman horses and reached Bukhara in 1825. However, all three died of fever on the return journey. His travels were published in 1841. Charles Masson, formerly of the East India Company, resided in Baluchistan, Afghanistan and the Punjab between 1826 and 1838 and published his travels. In September 1829, Lieutenant Arthur Conolly of the East India Company travelled from St. Petersburg, Russia to the Caspian desert, to Kir (northern Iran), was detained in Astrabad (northern Iran) as a Russian spy, then travelled with a caravan of pilgrims to Meshed, marched with the Afghan army from there to Herat, then traveled to Kandahar, to Quetta, then across the Thar Desert to the British frontier in January 1831. He published his travels in 1834. However, after 1830, Britain's commercial and diplomatic interest to the north-west would eventually become formidable. In 1831, Captain Alexander Burnes and Colonel Henry Pottinger's surveys of the Indus river would prepare the way for a future assault on the Sind to clear a path towards Central Asia. Burnes embarked on a dangerous 12-month journey beginning in 1831 into Afghanistan and through the Hindu Kush to Bukhara, returning in 1832. Burnes, a Christian travelling through a Muslim country was one of the first to study Afghanistan for British Intelligence and upon his return, he published his book, Travels To Bukhara, which became an overnight success in 1834. Between 1832 and 1834, Britain attempted to negotiate trade agreements with Ranjit Singh, ruler of the Sikh Empire, and the Amirs of Sindh. However, these attempts were unsuccessful.

==== Afghanistan and Central Asia ====
In 1835, Lord Auckland was appointed Governor-General, and replaced Bentinck who had pursued a non-intervention policy. The India Board instructed Auckland:

to watch more closely than has hitherto been attempted the progress of events in Afghanistan, and to counteract the progress of Russian influence...The mode of dealing with this very important question, whether by dispatching a confidential agent to Dost Mohammed of Kabul merely to watch the progress of events, or to enter into relations with this Chief, either of a political or merely in the first instance of a commercial character, we confide in your discretion as well as the adoption of any other measures that may appear to you desirable to counteract Russian influence in that quarter, should you be satisfied...that the time has arrived at which it would be right for you to interfere decidedly in the affairs of Afghanistan. Such an interference would doubtless be requisite, either to prevent the extension of Persian dominion in that quarter or to raise a timely barrier against the impending encroachments of Russian influence.

In that year, Lieutenant John Wood of the Indian Navy commanded the first steamboat to paddle up the Indus River and surveyed the river as he went. In 1838, he led an expedition that found one of the River Oxus' sources in Central Asia. He published his travels in 1872. In 1837, the Russian envoy Captain Jan Vitkevitch visited Kabul, and the British believed that it was to facilitate some form of diplomatic or military presence in Afghanistan. While in Kabul, he dined with the British envoy, Captain Alexander Burnes, who reported negatively on Russia's intentions. Russia feared British inroads on their commerce in Central Asia, as well as the influence that a Muslim power with British support might have on the other khanates. In 1837, Russian troops occupied the island of Ashuradeh in the Gorgan Bay of the southern Caspian Sea. However, from 1837 to 1857 the Russian Empire lent their support to the Shah.

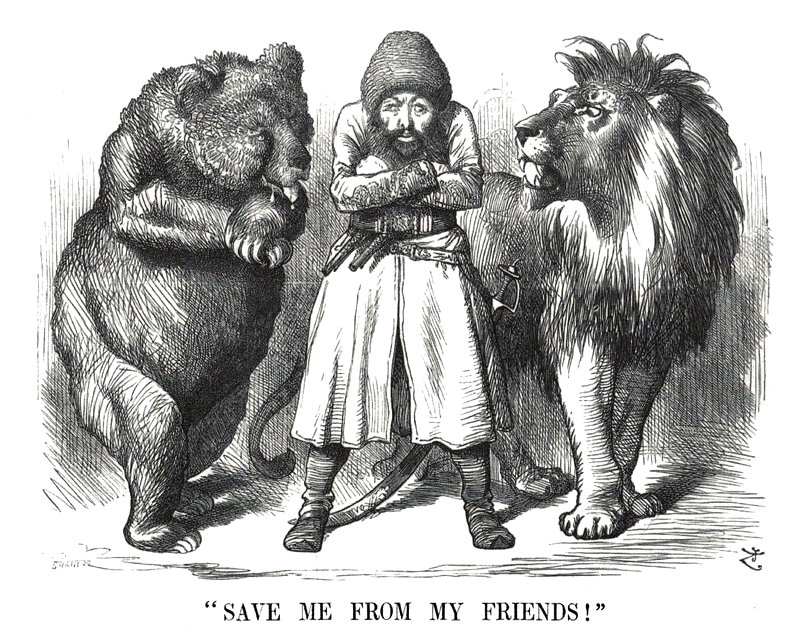
Political cartoon depicting the Afghan Emir Sher Ali with his "friends" the Russian Bear and British Lion (1878)

In 1838, Colonel Charles Stoddart of the East India Company arrived in the Emirate of Bukhara to arrange an alliance with Nasrullah Khan. Nasrullah Khan had Stoddart imprisoned in a vermin-infested dungeon because he had not bowed nor brought gifts. In 1841, Captain Arthur Conolly arrived to try to secure Stoddart's release. He was also imprisoned and on 17 June 1842 both men were beheaded. On hearing of the execution of the two British officers, Emperor Nicholas I of Russia would no longer receive Bukhara's gifts or emissaries, and its ambassador was turned back at Orenburg with a message that the Emperor would no longer have anything to do with the Emir of Bukhara. After its two representatives were executed in Bukhara, Britain actively discouraged officers from traveling in Turkestan.

During 1838, there were rumors in London of a coming Russian move towards Khiva. Additionally, Persia intended to annex Herat to make up for territory it had lost in the Russo-Persian War (1826–1828), however the allegiance of Herat to Afghanistan was crucial to the British strategy. The Siege of Herat began in November 1837, when the new Shah of Persia, Mohammed Mirza, arrived before Herat. His intention was to take Herat then move on to Kandahar. With him was the Russian Envoy Count Simonich, seconded Russian officers and a regiment of Russian deserters under the Polish general Berowski. Eldred Pottinger, an officer of the Bengal Artillery, who had earlier entered Herat in disguise, stiffened the defences and despite the presence of Russian advisers the siege lasted eight months. Britain threatened to take military action and Persia withdrew in September.

In October 1838, Auckland issued the Simla Manifesto, a piece of propaganda designed to blacken the reputation of Dost Mohammad Khan (Emir of Afghanistan) and which claimed that Dost Mohammad:

openly threatened...to call in every foreign aid that he could command...we could never hope that the tranquility of our neighborhood could be secured...the Governor-General confidently hopes that the Shah will speedily be replaced on his throne...the independence and integrity of Afghanistan restored, the British army will be withdrawn.

== First Anglo-Afghan War ==
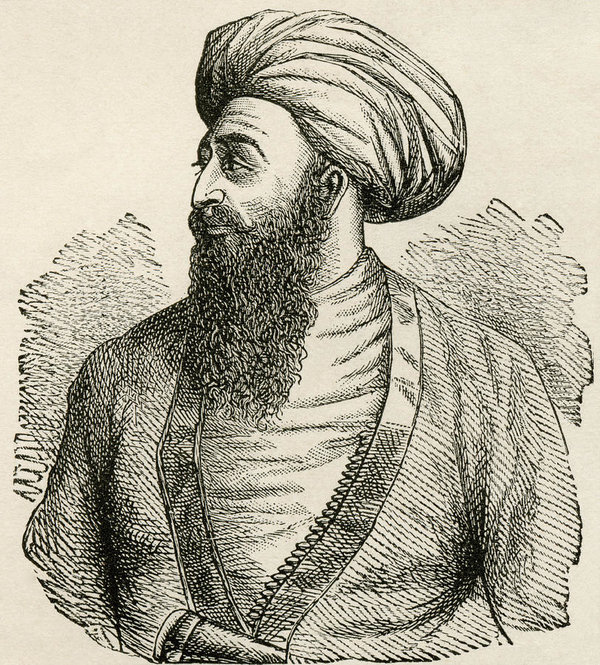
Dost Mohammad Khan, 1793 to 1863. Emir of Afghanistan. From The World's Inhabitants by G.T. Bettany published 1888.

British influence was to be extended into Afghanistan and it was to become a buffer state. The intention to invade was clear, and when a copy of the Manifesto reached London there was no objection.

In 1838, the British marched into Afghanistan and deposed Dost Mohammad Khan. After a period of resistance, Dost Mohammad surrendered despite his victories. The British sent him into exile in India and replaced him with the previous ruler, Shah Shuja Durrani, who shared their more progressive vision for the people of the region. Shah Shuja ul-Mulk had ascended the throne in 1803 and had signed a mutual defence agreement with the British in 1809 against a possible Franco-Russian invasion of India via Afghanistan. In the same year he was deposed and imprisoned by his half-brother, Mahmud Shah Durrani. There were a number of Amirs of Afghanistan until Dost Mohammad Khan gained power in 1826. Shah Shuja was not popular with the Afghans and tensions grew, leading to the killing of the British envoy, Captain Alexander Burnes, in 1841. By January 1842, the Afghans were in full revolt. With a weakening of military discipline, the British decided to withdraw from Kabul. The Kabul garrison of 4,500 troops and 12,000 camp followers left Kabul for Jalalabad that was 80 miles and 5 days march away. They were attacked by 30,000 Afghans. Six British officers escaped on horseback but only one, the wounded Dr William Brydon riding on a wounded horse, made it to Jalalabad. Over one hundred of the British and 2,000 sepoys and camp followers were taken hostage and the rest killed. So perished the "Army of the Indus". In April, a punitive expedition was dispatched and recaptured Kabul and freed the captives in September. The new Governor-General, Lord Ellenborough, decided to withdraw all British garrisons from Afghanistan and Dost Mohammad Khan was freed in India to return to the throne. Dost Mohammad is reported to have said:

I have been struck by the magnitude of your resources, your ships, your arsenals, but what I cannot understand is why the rulers of so vast and flourishing an empire should have gone across the Indus to deprive me of my poor and barren country.

=== Khiva (1839) ===
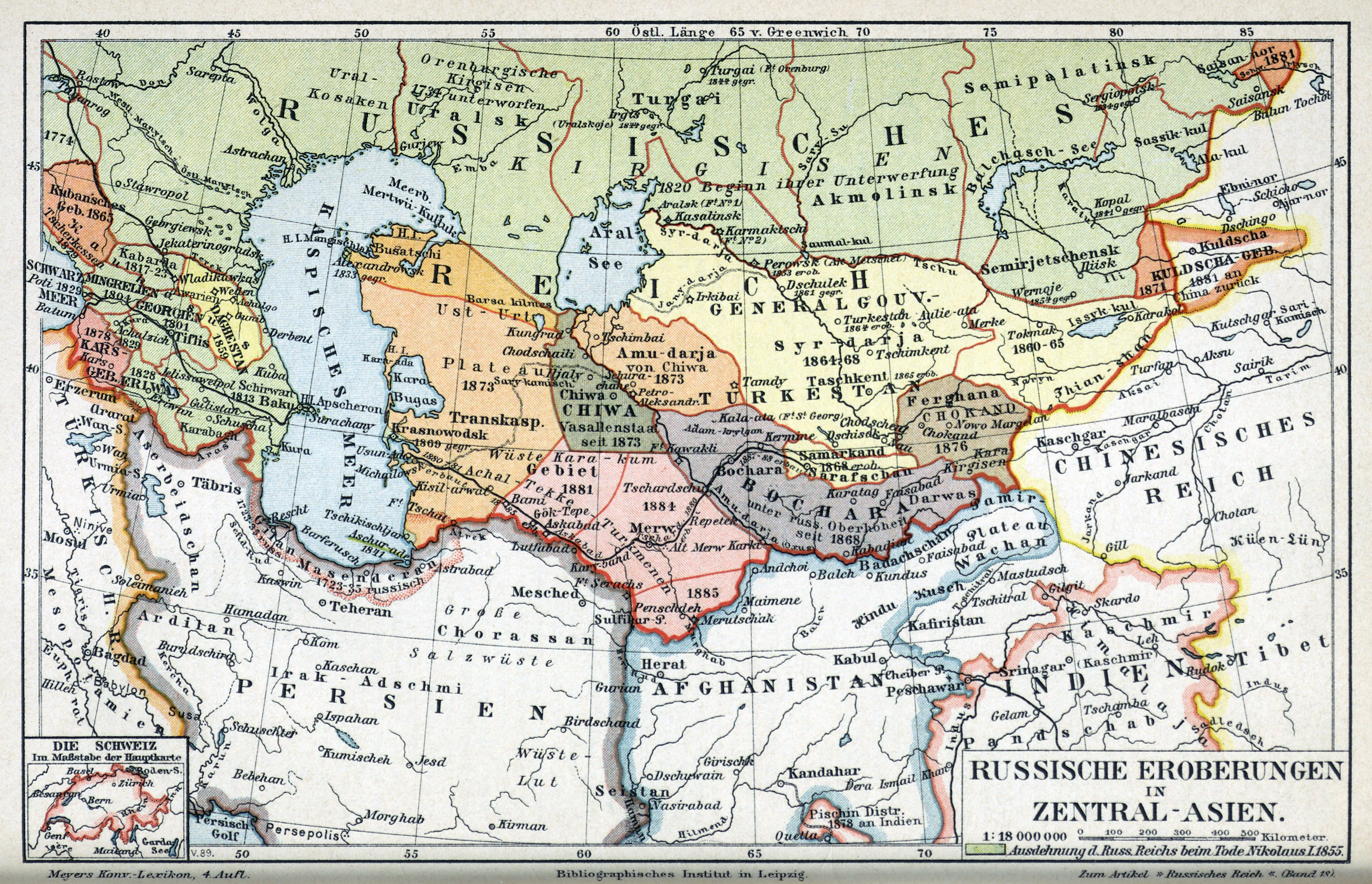
Russian Empire acquisitions by year in Central Asia up to 1885

In 1839, acting Captain James Abbott of the Bengal Artillery undertook a mission to the Khanate of Khiva in an attempt to negotiate the release of Russian slaves that would deny the Russians a pretext for invading Khiva. If war had already broken out, Abbot was instructed to attempt to negotiate a settlement. The attempted Russian assault on Khiva may have been in response to Britain's "forward policy" on Afghanistan, however it failed to reach Khiva due to the severe winter conditions. Of the 5,000 men who had left Orenburg, only 4,000 returned. Abbott was hampered by a lack of understanding of Khivan language and culture, and the attempt to release Russian slaves was unsuccessful. He did agree with the Khivan ruler, Allah Quli Khan, to establishing a British agent to Khiva and to mediate between Khiva and Russia. Abbott set off from Khiva in 1840 towards Russia to commence negotiations, which he did on his own initiative and it was not authorised by his superiors. His caravan was attacked by Khazakhs and he was wounded in the hand and taken hostage, however he and his party were released because they feared retribution. He reached Saint Petersburg but the attempt at mediation failed. His bravery was recognized through promotion to full Captain. In the same year, Lieutenant Richmond Shakespear of the Bengal Artillery was successful in negotiating the release of 416 Russian captives, whom he escorted into Russia. He was knighted for this undertaking.

== Anglo-Sikh Wars ==
In 1843, Britain annexed the Sind. The First Anglo-Sikh War was fought between the Sikh Empire and the East India Company in 1845–1846, resulting in the partial subjugation of the Sikh kingdom. The Second Anglo-Sikh War was fought in 1848–1849, resulting in subjugation of the remainder of the Sikh Empire, and the annexation of the Punjab Province and what subsequently became the North-West Frontier Province.

== Anglo-Persian War ==
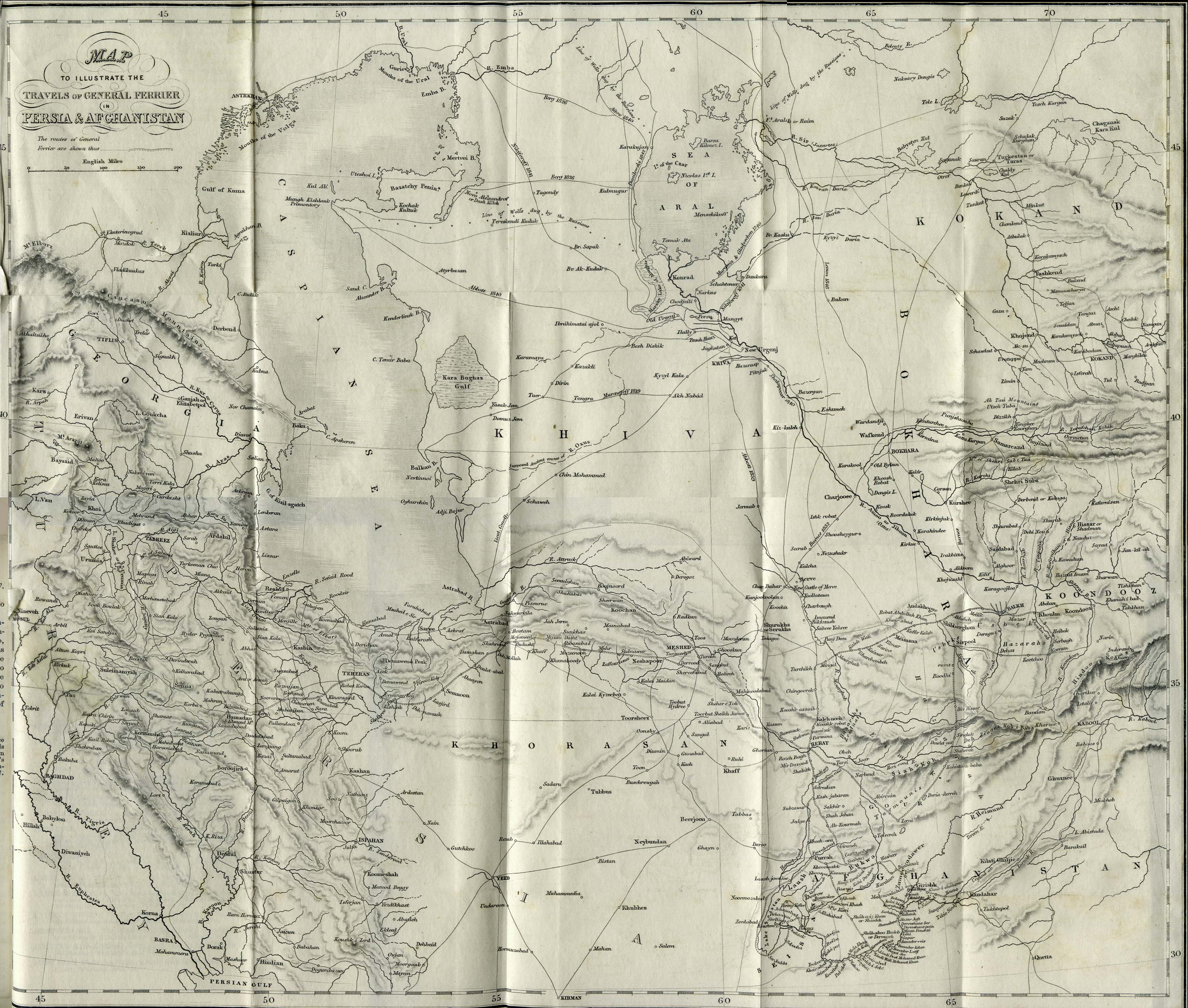
Map of northern Persia and northern Afghanistan in 1857 showing Khiva, Bukhara, and Kokand that form modern Turkmenistan and Uzbekistan

In 1856, Persia commenced an assault on Herat and the British Home Government declared war on Persia. The Anglo-Persian War was conducted under Major General Sir James Outram until 1857, when Persia and Britain both withdrew and Persia signed a treaty renouncing its claim on Herat.

== Further expansion ==
=== Under the British Crown ===
Following the Indian Rebellion of 1857, the East India Company's remaining powers were transferred to the British Crown in the person of Queen Victoria (who in 1876 was proclaimed Empress of India). As a state, the British Raj functioned as the guardian of a system of connected markets maintained by military power, business legislation and monetary management. The Government of India Act 1858 saw the India Office of the British government assume the administration of British India through a Viceroy appointed by the Crown.

In 1863 Sultan Ahmad Khan of Herat, who was placed into power by Persia and issued coinage on behalf of the Shah, attacked the disputed town of Farrah. Farrah had been under Dost Mohammad Khan's control since 1856, and he responded by sending his army to defeat Herat and reunited it with Afghanistan.

=== Under Alexander II of Russia ===
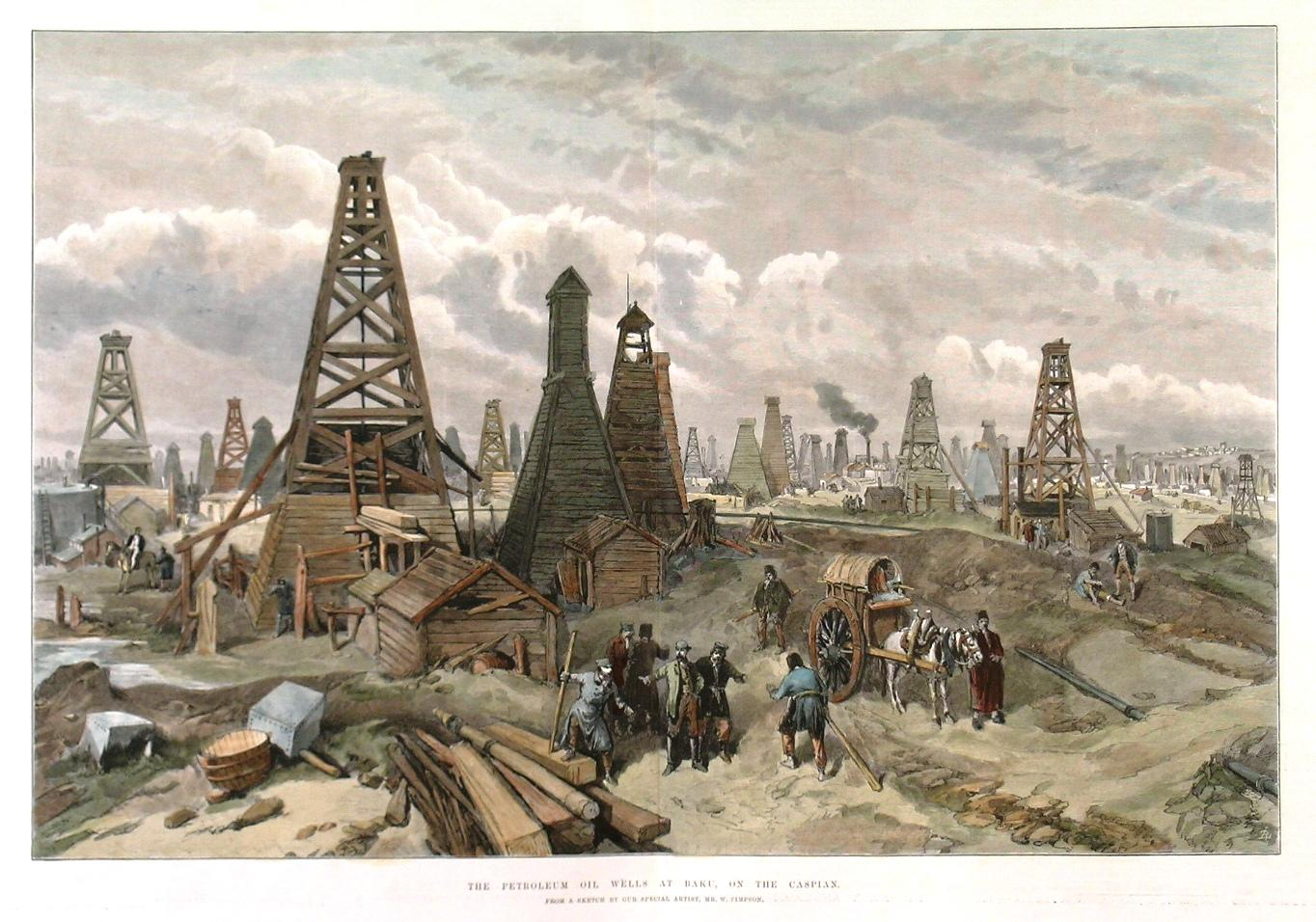
Oil Wells by the Caspian Sea, 1886

The Crimean War (during which Russian plans for invasion in British India, such as Duhamel plan and Khrulev plan, were proposed)_had ended in 1856 with Russia's defeat by an alliance of Britain, France, and the Ottoman Empire. The new and wary Alexander II of Russia waited some years so as not to antagonize the British, then Russia expanded into Central Asia in two campaigns. In 1864, a circular was sent to the consular officers abroad by Gorchakov, the Russian Chancellor, patiently explaining the reasons for expansion centering on the doctrines of necessity, power and spread of civilisation. Gorchakov went to great lengths to explain that Russia's intentions were meant not to antagonize the British but to bring civilised behavior and protect the traditional trade routes through the region. The first campaign started from Orenburg and proceeded in the direction of Kabul in Afghanistan. Russia occupied Chimkent in 1864, Tashkent in 1865, Khokhand and Bukhara in 1866, and Samarkand in 1868. Russia's influence now extended to outlying regions of Afghan Turkestan. The second campaign started from the Caspian Sea and was in the direction of Herat, near the Persian frontier. Khiva was occupied in 1873. Russian forces also seized Krasnovodsk (now in Turkmenistan) in 1869. Notable Russian generals included Konstantin Kaufman, Mikhail Skobelev, and Mikhail Chernyayev.

From 1869 to 1872, Mir Mahmud Shar was able to gain control of the Khanate of Badakhshan with the help of Afghanistan's new ruler, Amir Sher Ali Khan, and by 1873 Afghanistan governed Badakhshan.

== Tibet and Inner Asia ==
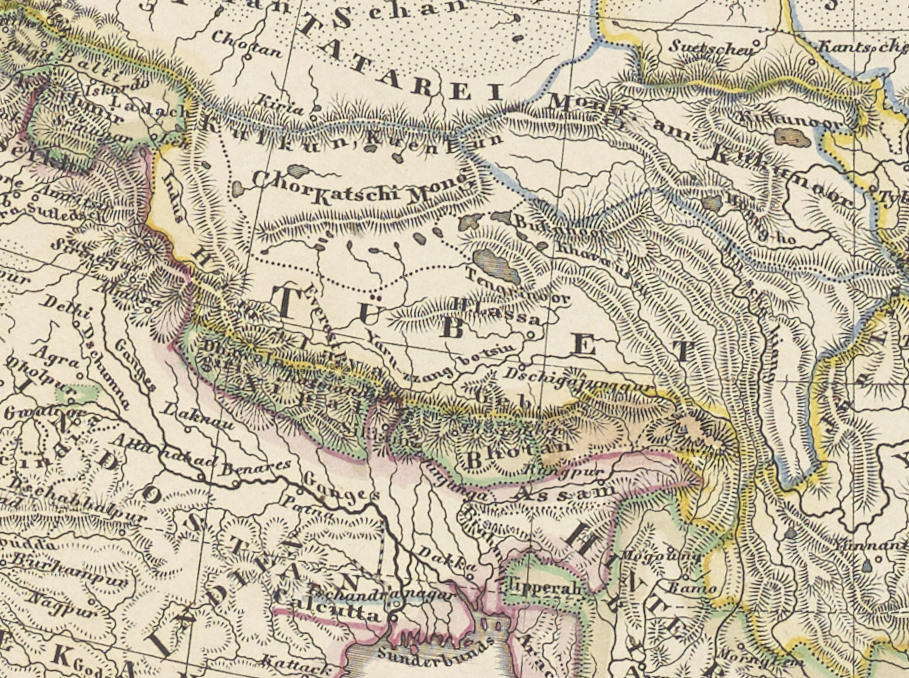
Tibet before 1859

British-Russian competition also existed in Tibet and "Inner Asia". Strategists of the Russian Empire sought to create a springboard to surround the Qing dynasty in Inner Asia as well as a second front against British India from the northeast direction.

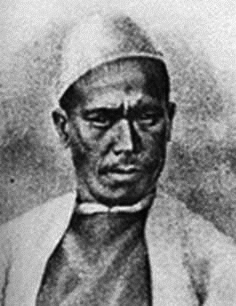
Nain Singh Rawat (1830–1882), a surveyor employed by the British to explore the Himalayas

Britain had been exploring territories north of India by recruiting "Pundits", native Indian explorers, among them Nain Singh, who reached Lhasa, Tibet, in 1866. He and his cousin Kishen Singh continued to travel around Tibet and surrounding regions for many years. The publications of the Royal Geographical Society in 1869 made the arrival of British Pundits at Lhasa known in Russia. The Russian explorer Nikolay Przhevalsky felt there was a British threat to Russian ambitions in Inner Asia, and set out on a series of 1870s expeditions. Although he failed to reach Tibet's capital at Lhasa, he travelled extensively in Tibet, Qinghai, and Xinjiang. Przhevalsky's expeditions became famous and increased interest in European expansion into Asia among the Russian press, aristocracy and academia. In the 1880s, Przhevalsky advocated for the "forcible annexation of western China, Mongolia, and Tibet, and their colonization by Cossacks", although the plan received some pushback from Tsar Alexander III who favoured influence rather than an invasion.

Historian Alexandre Andreev argues that Tibet was a major territorial focus of the Russian Empire and Soviet Union, and was connected to the Great Game. Andreyev mentions that in 1893, Tsar Alexander III financed an adventurist project by a Tibetan medicine practitioner, Piotr Aleksandrovich Badmaev, which aimed to annex Mongolia, Tibet, and China to the Russian Empire. Although not very successful, various agents were sent out to conduct espionage in Tibet in regards to British influence, investigate trade and attempted to foment rebellion in Mongolia against the Qing dynasty. In the late 19th century, Britain strategically supported the Qing Dynasty's protectorates against the Russian Empire. According to Andreyev, "in the days of the Great Game, Mongolia was an object of imperialist encroachment by Russia, as Tibet was for the British.""

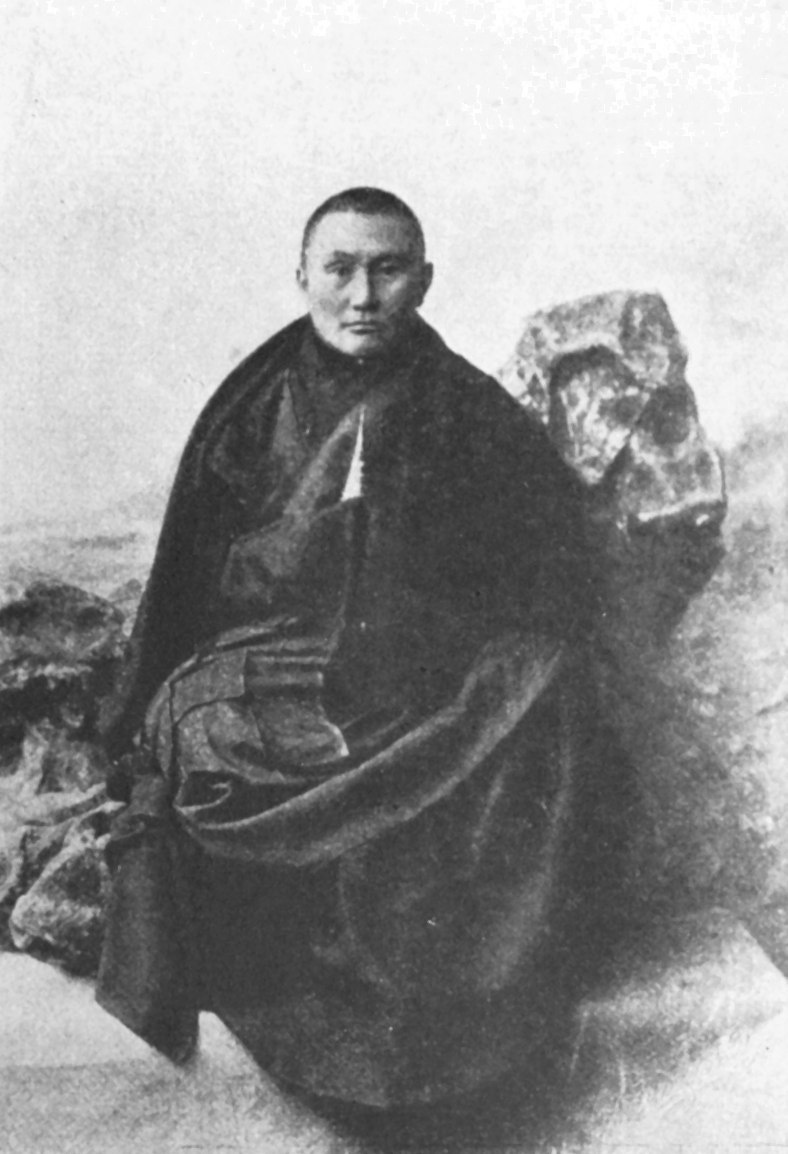
Agvan Dorzhiev (1853–1938) acted as a diplomatic link between the Russian Empire and the 13th Dalai Lama.

Britain feared increased Russian influence in Tibet, due to contacts between the Russia-born Buryat Agvan Dorzhiev and the 13th Dalai Lama. Agvan Dorzhiev claimed that Russia was a powerful Buddhist country that would ally with Tibet against China or Britain. In response, Britain sought to increase its own influence in Tibet as a buffer for British India. British forces, led by Sir Francis Younghusband, invaded the country with the Curzon expedition in 1904 and made a treaty with the Tibetans, the 1904 Lhasa Convention.

According to Robert Irwin, who considers a smaller, espionage-focused interpretation of the Great Game, Tibet was indeed connected to the Great Game, but "the truth is that, in the period concerned, British ruling circles didn't own so much as a sweetshop in Tibet." Specifically, he notes that the commercial trade that followed the Younghusband expedition was negligible compared to the cost of the expedition.

Pradip Phanjoubam states that the Anglo-Russian rivalry in Tibet ultimately had implications for Northeast India as well, culminating in the Simla Convention. Phanjoubam argues that Britain overreacted to Russian interest in Tibet, if perhaps understandably due to the presence of Dorzhiev. A constantly shifting British policy on China from pro- to anti-Qing protectorates by Britain, as well as the shift from opposition to Russia to the 1907 Convention, led the Qing Dynasty to decide on a forward policy in the Himalayas. If it were not for the Xinhai Revolution, India would have been more threatened than it was. Nonetheless, "On the chessboard of the Great Game in far off places as Mongolia, Afghanistan and Persia was thus determined the fate of British Tibet policy, and therefore, the shadow of the Great Game too came to fall on the future of India's Northeast."

In its Meiji period, the Empire of Japan would observe the Great Game and participate indirectly through diplomacy and espionage. For example, Japan hosted Abdurreshid Ibrahim, a pan-Muslim opponent of Russian and British expansion. Japanese interest in the region as well as enmity with Russia led to the Anglo-Japanese Alliance and an attempted Ottoman-Japanese alliance. Nishi Tokujirō made some of Japan's first official diplomatic interactions in Central Asia and observed Russian colonial policy during the early Meiji period, while during the end of the period, Colonel Fukushima Yasumasa managed Japan's Central Asia policy during its contest with Russia. Later, the Russo-Japanese War also changed and weakened Russian designs in Xinjiang. According to researcher Jin Noda, Japanese intelligence activities occurred "against a backdrop of acute Russian and British interest in the geopolitical fate of Xinjiang, Tibet, and Russian Turkestan".

Carl Gustaf Emil Mannerheim also acted as a tsarist agent during the Great Game, leading an expedition through Tibet, Xinjiang, and Gansu on the way to Beijing. The Russian General Staff wanted on-the-ground intelligence about reforms and activities by the Qing dynasty, as well as the military feasibility of invading Western China: a possible move in their struggle with Britain for control of inner Asia. In a report to the Russian General Staff, Mannerheim also argued in favor of a Russian invasion of Xinjiang. Disguised as an ethnographic collector, Mannerheim joined the French archeologist Paul Pelliot's expedition at Samarkand in modern Uzbekistan. They started from the terminus of the Trans-Caspian Railway in Andijan in July 1906, but Mannerheim quarreled with Pelliot, so he made the greater part of the expedition on his own. Mannerheim met the 13th Dalai Lama of Tibet and acted as an envoy of Russia.

== Persia ==
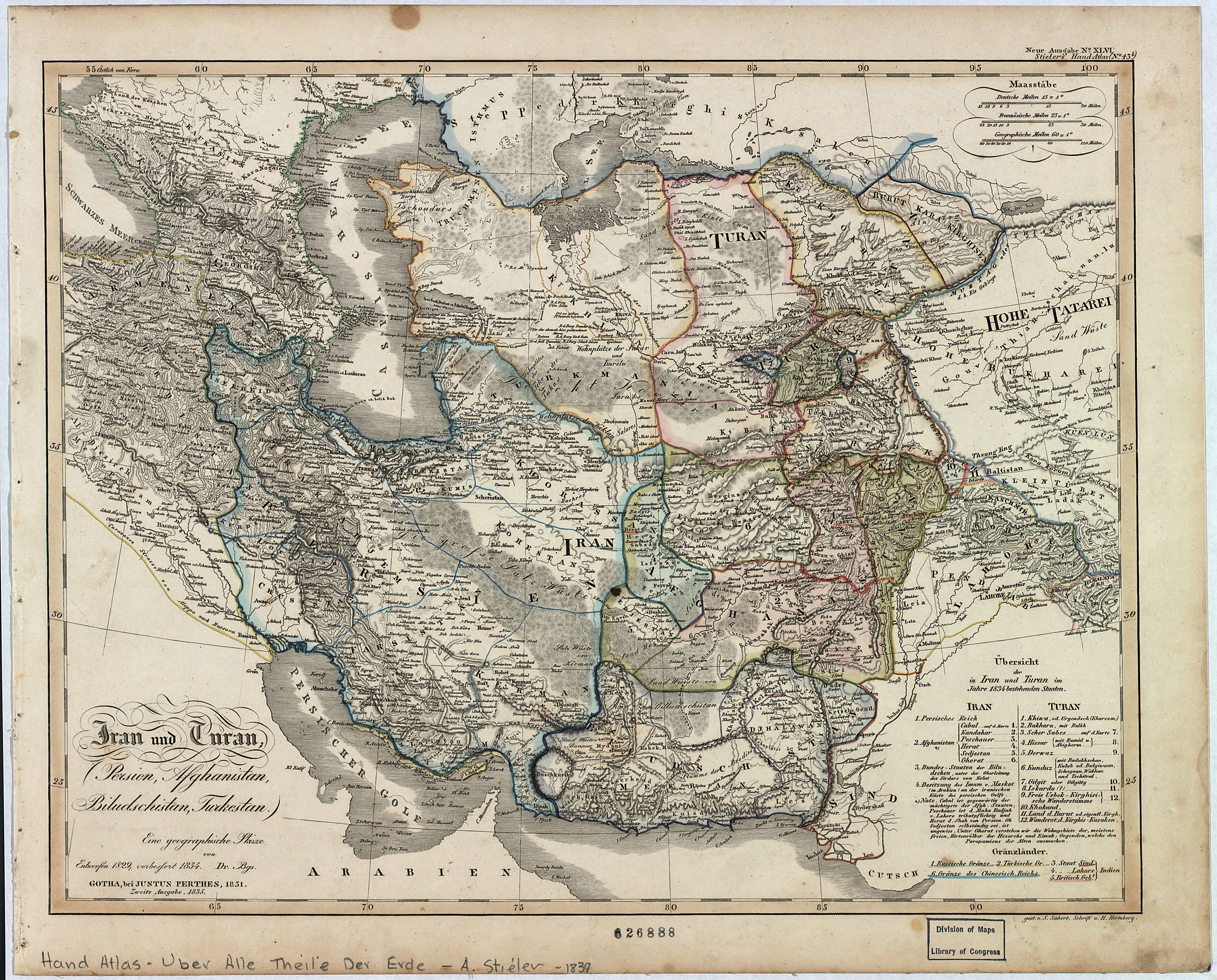
Iran and Turkestan in 1835

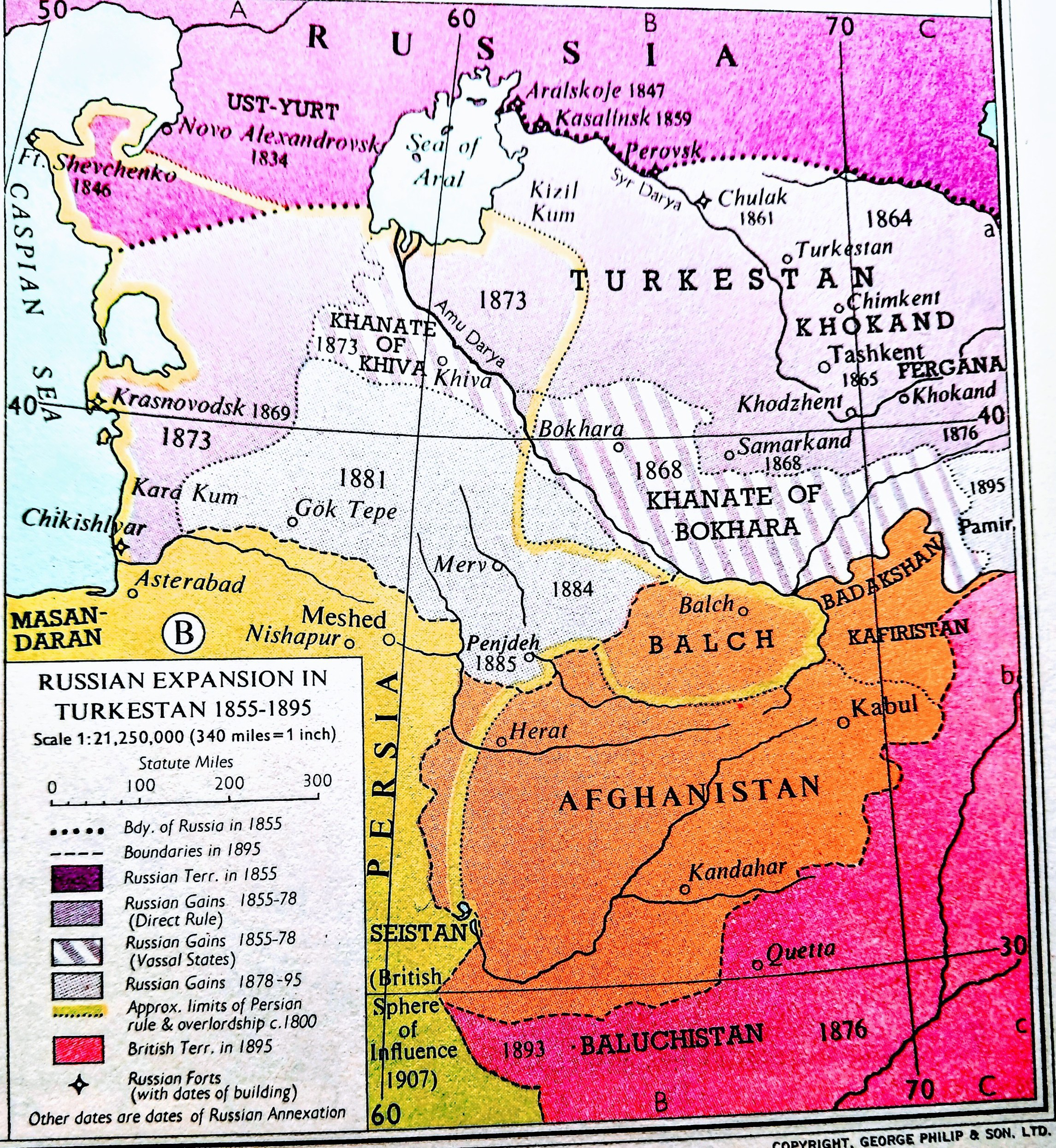
Persian rule & overlordship c.1800 in Central Asia/Russian expansion in Central Asia in 1834-1895

Various authors connect British-Russian competition in Iran to the Great Game as well. This competition continued until the Anglo-Russian Entente in 1907 after which the British and Russian Empires largely moved together in their overtures for imperial influence in the region until the Bolshevik Revolution.

The Great Game in Iran took the form of military conquests, diplomatic intrigues, and the competition of trade goods. Russian colonists arrived in northern Iran, settling the region around Astarabad. Although Britain had a reputation for industrialization and international trade boosted by its colony of India, Russian authors saw the Russian Empire as competing directly with Britain for trade in Iran and other bordering markets. Russian travelogues written between the 1870s and the turn of the 1900s seem to imply that Russian commerce had become dominant in the northern and western portions of Iran that would be officially delineated to Russia by Britain in 1907. Russia had also acquired concessions such as a monopoly on the lucrative caviar in the southern Caspian Sea, which lasted until after the First World War.

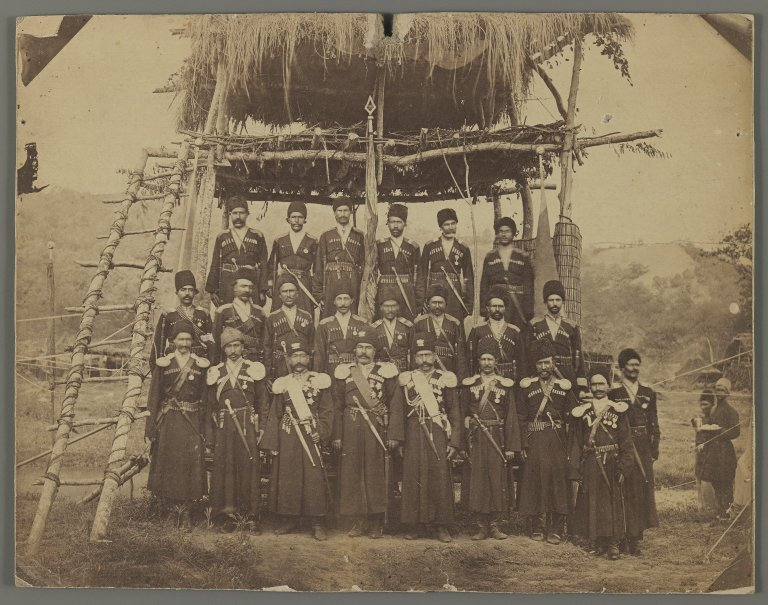
Persian Cossacks, some time after 1876

After the 1828 Treaty of Turkmanchay, Russia received territorial domination in Iran. With the Romanovs shifting to a policy of 'informal support' for the weakened Qajar dynasty—continuing to place pressure with advances in the largely nomadic Turkestan, a crucial frontier territory of the Qajars – this Russian domination of Persia continued for nearly a century. The Persian monarchy became more of a symbolic concept in which Russian diplomats were themselves powerbrokers in Iran and the monarchy was dependent on British and Russian loans for funds. In 1879, the establishment of the Cossack Brigade by Russian officers gave the Russian Empire influence over the modernization of the Qajar army. This influence was especially pronounced because the Persian monarchy's legitimacy was predicated on an image of military prowess, first Turkic and then European-influenced. By the 1890s, Russian tutors, doctors and officers were prominent at the Shah's court, influencing policy personally. Russia and Britain had competing investments in the industrialisation of Iran including roads and telegraph lines, as a way to profit and extend their influence. However, until 1907 the Great Game rivalry was so pronounced that mutual British and Russian demands to the Shah to exclude the other, blocked all railroad construction at the end of the 19th century. In 1907 the British and Russian Empires came to a mutual agreement, which provided a zone of influence in southeastern Iran to Britain and northern Iran to Russia.

Tsar Nicholas II would be a staunch supporter of the Mohammad Ali Shah Qajar against the revolutionaries, in a large-scale intervention that involved both regular Russian troops and the Persian Cossacks. Failing to fully suppress the Persian Constitutional Revolution or keep Muhammad Ali Shah in power, the constitutional reforms were put in place against Russia's wishes, though the Cossack Brigade remained a major factor. An Iranian former Cossack, Reza Shah, would establish the Pahlavi dynasty.

== Second Anglo-Afghan War ==
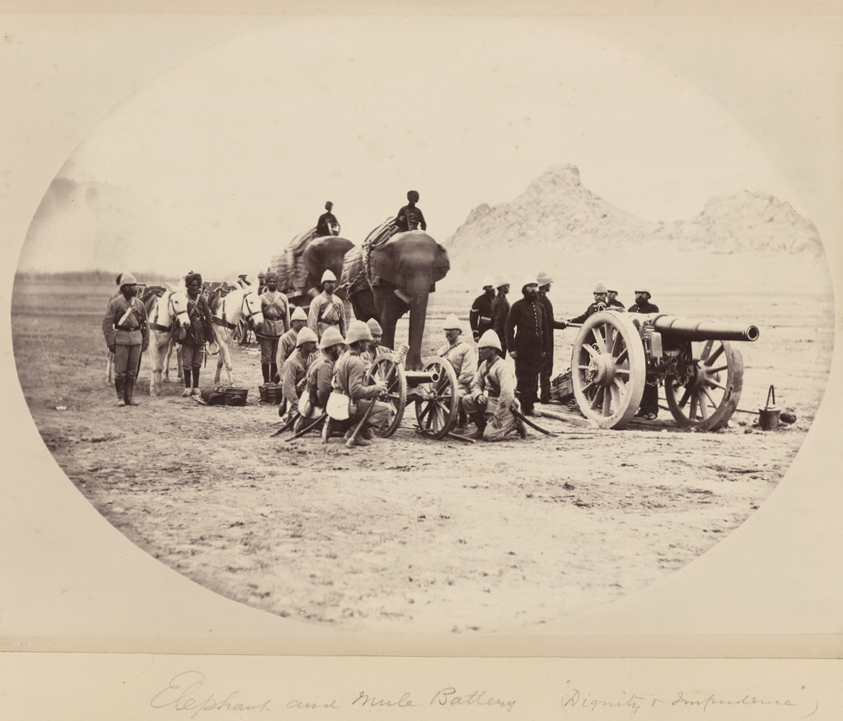
Elephant and Mule Battery, Second Anglo-Afghan War

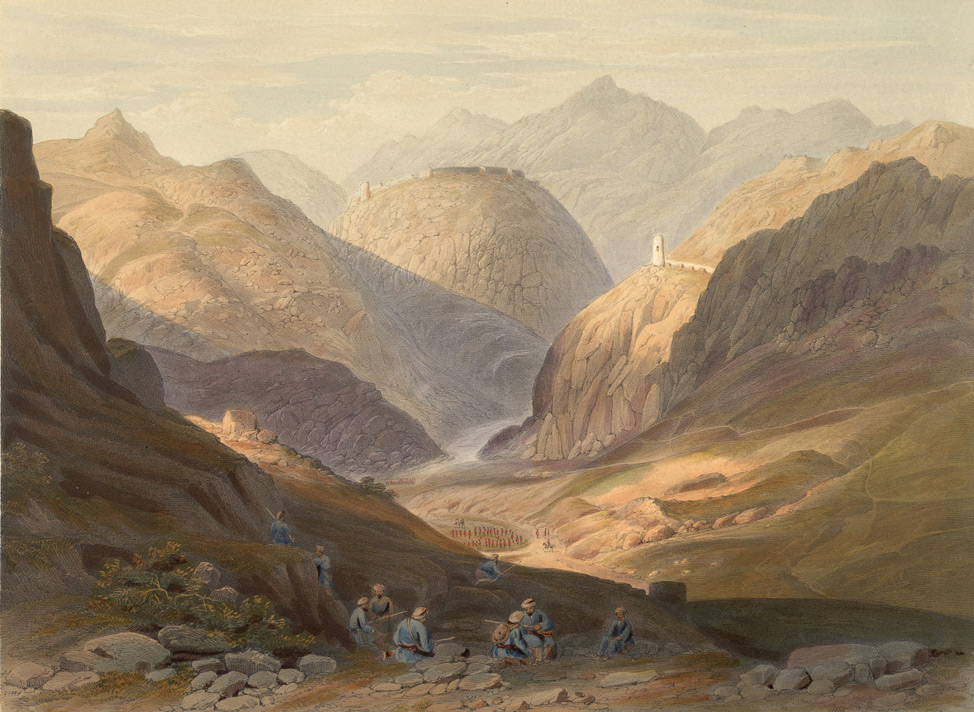
Khyber Pass with Ali Masjid fort – lithograph by James Rattray (1848)

In 1878, Russia sent troops on an uninvited diplomatic mission to Kabul. Sher Ali Khan, the Amir of Afghanistan, tried unsuccessfully to keep them from entering Afghanistan, the Russians arrived in Kabul on 22 July 1878. As a reaction, on 14 August the British demanded that Sher Ali also accept a British mission. The Amir not only refused to receive a British mission under Neville Bowles Chamberlain but also threatened to stop it if it attempted to enter his country. Lord Lytton, the Viceroy of British India, ordered an envoy to set out on a diplomatic mission for Kabul in September 1878. The mission was turned back as it approached the eastern entrance of the Khyber Pass, triggering the Second Anglo–Afghan War. In November 1878, 40,000 men led by the British Raj, invaded Afghanistan from British India. Warfare had been settled for a while through diplomatic negotiations in 1879, in 1880 however the fighting was reignited after a British envoy on a mission to Kabul was massacred.

== Diplomacy ==
=== Agreement Between Great Britain and Russia 1873 ===
On 21 January 1873, Great Britain and Russia signed an agreement that stipulated that the eastern Badakhshan area as well as the Wakhan Corridor to Lake Sariqol were Afghan territory, the northern Afghan boundary was the Amu Darya (Oxus River) as far west as Khwaja Salar (near Khamyab), and a joint Russian-British commission would define the boundary from the Amu Darya to the Persian border on the Hari (Harirud) River. However, no boundary west of the Amu Darya was defined until 1885. The agreement was regarded as having defined the British and Russian spheres of influence in Afghanistan and Central Asia, gave the two sides the legitimacy to advance within their designated zones, created cordial relations between the two rival European powers, and raised the new problem of defining what were the frontiers of Afghanistan, Russia and China in the upper Oxus region in the Pamir mountains. The agreement was negotiated by Russian diplomat Prince Alexander Gorchakov, the lands of Badakhshan and Wakhan were accepted by Russia as part of Afghanistan, Russia accepted all of Britain's proposals on Afghanistan's northern borders and expected that Britain would keep Afghanistan from committing any aggression. However, this set in motion Russia's annexation of the Khanate of Khiva in the same year. Badakhshan would later be divided between Afghanistan and Russian-controlled Bukhara by the Pamir Boundary Commission in 1895.

=== Treaty of Gandamak (1879) ===
After the British Siege of Kabul, warfare was settled diplomatically by the Treaty of Gandamak of 1879. The British sent an envoy and mission to Kabul, but on 3 September this mission was massacred and the conflict was reignited. The second phase ended in September 1880 when the British defeated Ayub Khan outside Kandahar. A new Emir, Abdul Rahman Khan who was known to be a Russian ally and an opponent of the British, ratified and confirmed the Gandamak treaty once more. When the British and Indian soldiers had withdrawn, the Afghans agreed to let the British attain most of their geopolitical objectives, as well as create a buffer between the British Raj and the Russian Empire. The British were aware that Amir Abdur Rahman Khan had the support of the Afghans to continue fighting and he did not allow a British resident to stay in Kabul which was a British objective that caused the start of the conflict. In return, he accepted British control of Afghanistan's foreign policies while maintaining internal sovereignty and to cede to the British a number of its southern frontier areas, including the districts of Pishin, Sibi, Harnai, and Thal Chotiali.

In 1881, Russian forces however took Geok Tepe and in 1884 they occupied Merv. As the Russian forces were close to Herat, the British and Russian governments formed a joint Anglo-Russian diplomatic Afghan Boundary Commission in the same year to define the borders between the Russian Empire and northern Afghanistan.

In 1885, a Russian force annexed the Panjdeh district north of Herat province and its fort in what has been called the Panjdeh incident. The Afghans claimed that the people of the district had always paid tribute to Afghanistan, and the Russians argued that this district was part of the Khanates of Khiva and Merv which they had annexed earlier. The Afghan Boundary Commission was supposed to have settled the dispute, however the battle occurred before its arrival. The Afghan force of 500 was overwhelmed by superior Russian numbers. Britain did not aid Afghanistan as was required by the Treaty of Gandamak, leading the Amir to conclude that he could not rely on the British in the face of Russian aggression.

German Chancellor Otto von Bismarck saw how important the Great Game had become for Russia and Britain. Germany had no direct stakes, however its dominance of Europe was enhanced when Russian troops were based as far away from Germany as possible. Over two decades, 1871–1890, he maneuvered to help the British, hoping to force the Russians to commit more soldiers to Asia. However, Bismarck through the Three Emperors' League also aided Russia, by pressuring the Ottoman Empire to block the Bosporus from British naval access, compelling an Anglo-Russian negotiation regarding Afghanistan.

=== Protocol between Great Britain and Russia (1885) ===
Panjdeh Incident (overlaid on a map of modern-day Turkmenistan)
= Hari-Rud river =Murghab river

On 10 September 1885, the Delimitation Protocol between Great Britain and Russia was signed in London. The protocol defined the boundary from the Oxus to the Harirud and was later followed by 19 additional protocols providing further detail between 1885 and 1888. The Afghan Boundary Commission agreed that Russia would relinquish the farthest territory captured in their advance, but retain Panjdeh. The agreement delineated a permanent northern Afghan frontier at the Amu Darya, with the loss of a large amount of territory, especially around Panjdeh.

This left the border east of Lake Zorkul in the Wakhan region to be defined. This territory was claimed by China, Russia, and Afghanistan. In the 1880s, the Afghans had advanced north of the lake to the Alichur Pamir. In 1891, Russia sent a military force to this area and its commander, Yanov, ordered the British Captain Francis Younghusband to leave Bozai Gumbaz in the Little Pamir. The Russians claimed that because they had annexed the Khanate of Kokand they had a claim over the Pamirs. Afghanistan claimed that the region never paid tribute to Kokand and was independent, so having annexed it the region was theirs. The British claimed that this was a breach of the Anglo-Russian Agreement of 1873. Unfortunately for Britain, the Indian government pointed out that Bozai Gumbaz was not included in the Agreement and so it was in an undefined zone. Bozai Gumbaz had not appeared on the Russian map as being in Wakhan. Additionally, the British became aware that Younghusband had mistakenly entered Russian territory near Kara Kul and could have been arrested by the administrator there. Yanov offered a verbal apology if he had mistakenly entered the Wakhan territory, and the Russian government proposed a joint survey to agree on a border.

In 1892, the British sent Charles Murray, 7th Earl of Dunmore to the Pamirs to investigate. Britain was concerned that Russia would take advantage of Chinese weakness in policing the area to gain territory. Murray was engaged in some form of diplomacy or espionage but the matter is not clear, and in 1893 reached agreement with Russia to demarcate the rest of the border, a process completed in 1895.

=== Agreement between Great Britain and Afghanistan (1893) ===
On 12 November 1893, the Agreement between Great Britain and Afghanistan was signed in Kabul. The Agreement reconfirmed the 1873 Agreement, required Afghanistan to withdraw from the territory north of the Amu Darya that it had occupied in 1884, and called for delimitation of the boundary east of Lake Sari.

When Mortimer Durand, Secretary for State of India was appointed administrator of the Gilgit Agency (now part of the Gilgit-Baltistan of Pakistan), he opened up the region by building roads, telegraph, and mail systems while maintaining a dialogue with the Mir of Gilgit. He intended to improve the road from Kashmir through the princely states of Hunza and Nagar and up to the frontier with Russia. The Mirs of Nagar and Hunza saw this as a threat to their natural advantage of remoteness. In 1890, Durand reinforced Chalt Fort that was near the border due to the rumor that Nagar and Hunza fighters were about to attack it, and continued redeveloping the road up to the fort. In May 1891, Nagar and Hunza sent a warning to Durand not to continue work on the road to the fort and to vacate the fort, which was on the Gilgit side of the border, else they would regard it as an act of war. Durand reinforced the fort and accelerated the road construction to it, causing Nagar and Hunza to see this as an escalation and so they stopped mail from the British Resident in Chinese Turkmenistan through their territory. British India regarded this as a breach of their 1889 agreement with Hunza, and after an ultimatum was issued and ignored they initiated the Anglo-Brusho Campaign of 1891. Hunza and Nagar came under a British protectorate in 1893.

=== Exchange of Notes between Great Britain and Russia (1895) ===
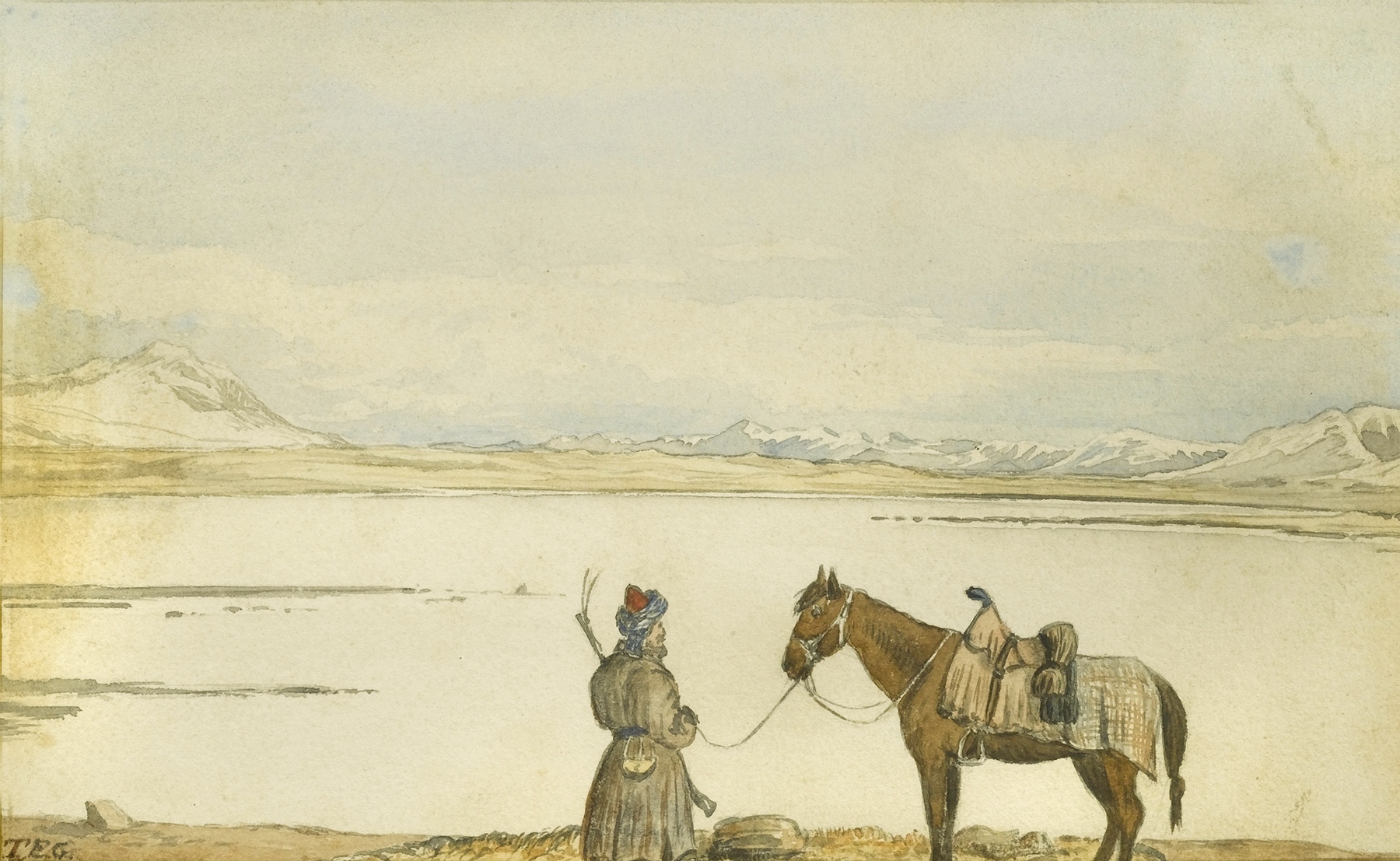
A watercolor of Lake Zorkul, Pamirs, by British Army officer Thomas Edward Gordon (1874)

On 11 March 1895, there was an Exchange of Notes between Great Britain and Russia. The notes defined British and Russian spheres of influence east of Lake Sari-Qul by defining the northern boundary of the Wakhan Corridor east of the lake. This boundary was subsequently demarcated by a mixed commission. The Great Game is proposed to have ended on 10 September 1895 with the signing of the Pamir Boundary Commission protocols, when the border between Afghanistan and the Russian empire was defined. The Pamir Boundary Commission was conducted by Major-General Gerard who met with a Russian deputation under General Povalo-Shveikovsky in the remote Pamir region in 1895, who were charged with demarcating the boundary between Russian and British spheres of interest from Lake Victoria eastwards to the Chinese border. The report of the Commission proved the absolute impracticality of any Russian invasion of India through the Pamir mountains. The result was that Afghanistan became a buffer state between the two powers.

It was agreed that the Amu Darya river would form the border between Afghanistan and the Russian Empire. The agreements also resulted in the Russian Empire losing control of most Afghan territory it conquered, with the exception of Panjdeh. The Pamir Mountains were demarcated as a border line between the Russian Empire and Afghanistan as well. The Taghdumbash would be the subject of a later Afghan-China agreement. To conclude their agreement, one peak was named Mount Concord. In exchange for a British agreement to use the term Nicholas Range in honor of the Emperor Nicholas II of Russia on official maps, the Russians agreed to refer to Lake Zorkul as Lake Victoria in honour of Queen Victoria of the United Kingdom.

The Russians had gained all of the lands north of the Amu Darya which included the land claimed by the Khanate of Khiva, including the approaches to Herat, and all of the land claimed by the Khanate of Khoqand, including the Pamir plateau. To ensure a complete separation, this new Afghan state was given an odd eastern appendage known as the Wakhan Corridor. "In setting these boundaries, the final act of the tense game played out by the British and Russian governments came to a close."

=== Anglo-Russian Convention of 1907 ===
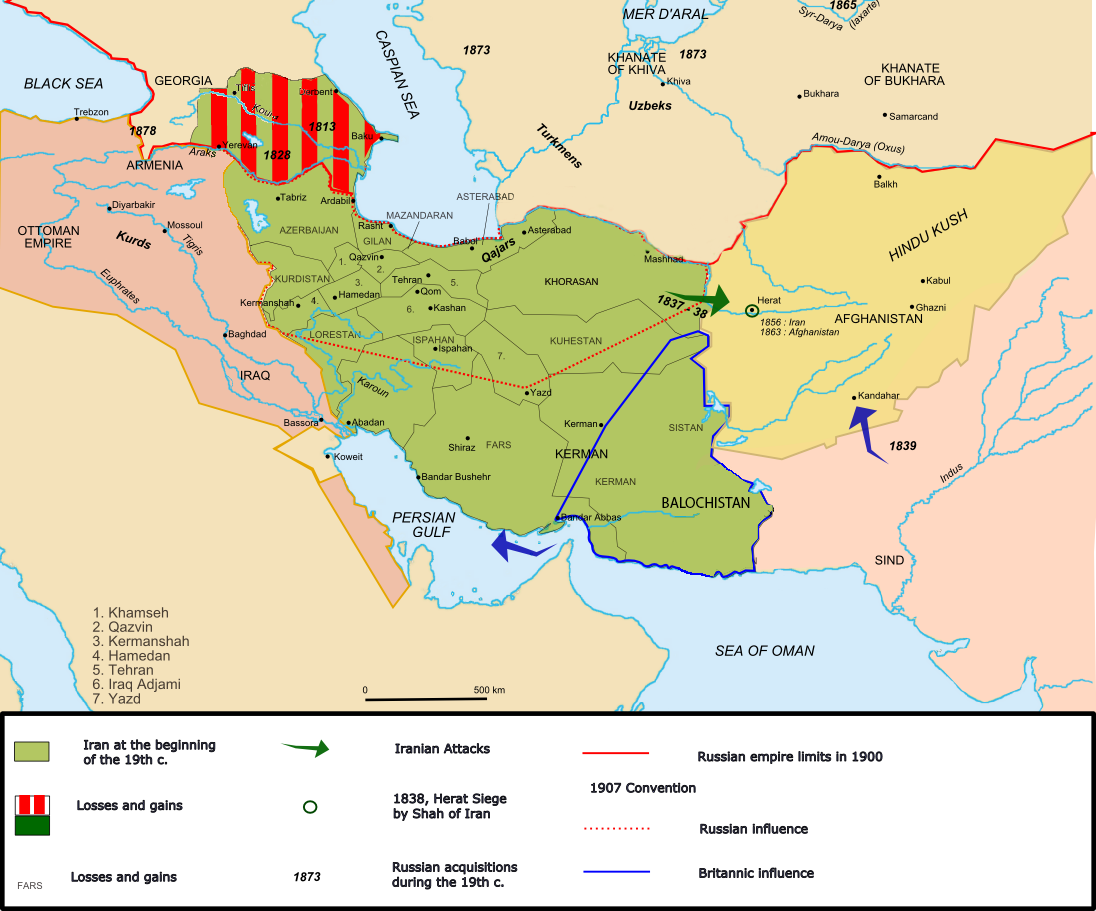
Influence zones in Iran following the Anglo-Russian Convention of 1907

In the Anglo-Russian Convention of 1907, the Russian Empire and British Empire officially ended their rivalry to focus on opposing the German Empire. In the Convention of 1907, Russia recognized Afghanistan and southern Iran as part of the British sphere of influence, while Britain recognized Central Asia and northern Iran as part of the Russian sphere of influence. Both parties recognized Tibet as a neutral territory, except Russia had special privileges in negotiating with the Dalai Lama, and Britain had special privileges in Tibetan commercial deals.

For a time, the British and Russian Empires moved together against potential German entrance into the Great Game, and against a constitutional movement in Iran that threatened to dispel the two-way sphere of influence. Russia had earlier established the Persian Cossack Brigade in 1879, a force which was led by Russian officers and served as a vehicle for Russian influence in Iran.

In 1908, the Persian Constitutional Revolution sought to establish a Western-oriented, democratic civil society in Iran, with an elected Majilis, a relatively free press and other reforms. Seeking to resolve financial problems of the Qajar dynasty such as heavy debts to Imperial Russia and Britain, the Majilis recruited the American financial expert, Morgan Schuster, who later wrote the book The Strangling of Persia condemning Britain and Russia.

The Russian Empire intervened in the Persian Constitutional Revolution to support the Shah and abolish the constitution. The Cossacks bombarded the Majilis in June 1908 and occupied Tehran. Additional brigades of the Russian Army were also deployed to assist the Shah and occupied Tabriz after April 1909. Nonetheless, the constitutionalists were able to retake the capital and were initially victorious with the Triumph of Tehran in July 1909, and dispelled Mohammad Ali Shah Qajar, who was exiled and took refuge with the Russians. When a new ruler, Ahmad Shah Qajar, took power he found it difficult to completely reverse the constitutional reforms, yet the Qajar state was weakened by the upheaval and the Qajar court dependent on foreign powers. Meanwhile, Britain and Russia aligned to oust Shuster from Iran by an ultimatum in 1911 which was unanimously rejected by the Majilis. British and Russian officials coordinated as the Russian army, still present in Persia, invaded the capital again and suspended the parliament. The Tsar ordered the troops in Tabriz "to act harshly and quickly", while purges were ordered, leading to many executions of prominent revolutionaries. The British Ambassador, George Head Barclay reportedly disapproved of this "reign of terror", though would soon pressure Persian ministers to officialize the Anglo-Russian partition of Iran. By June 1914, Russia established near-total control over its northern zone, while Britain had established influence over Baluch and Bakhtiari autonomous tribal leaders in the southeastern zone. Qajar Iran would become a battleground between Russian, Ottoman, and British forces in the Persian campaign of World War I.

== Historiographical dating ==
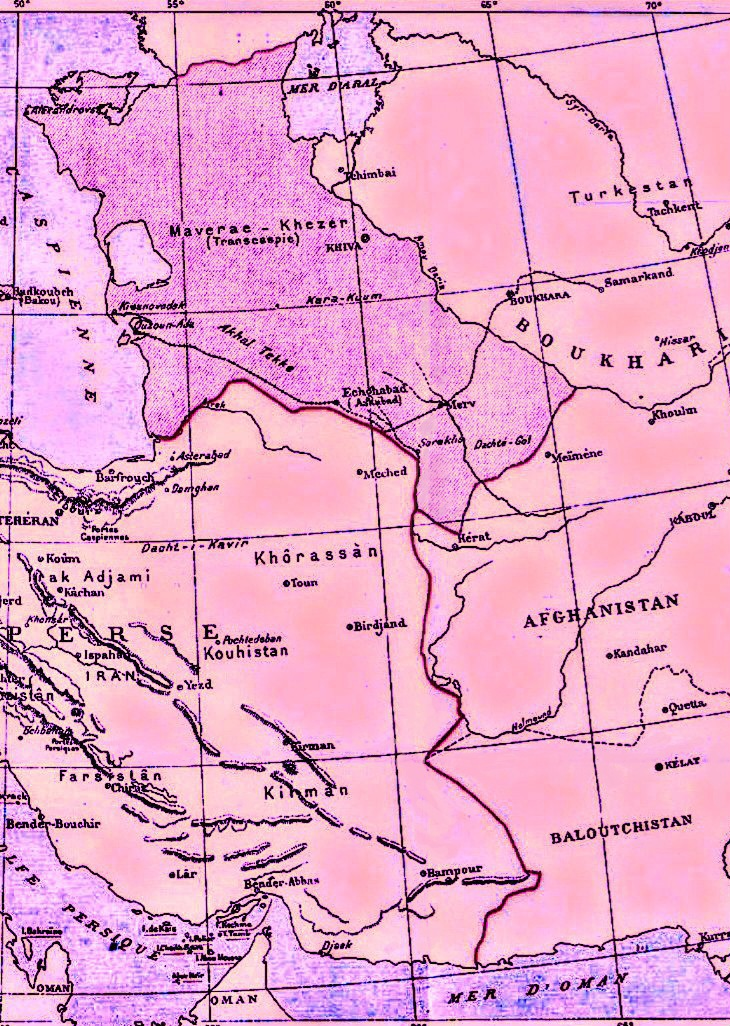
Persia claims in Central Asia at Versailles Peace Conference in 1918, after World War I

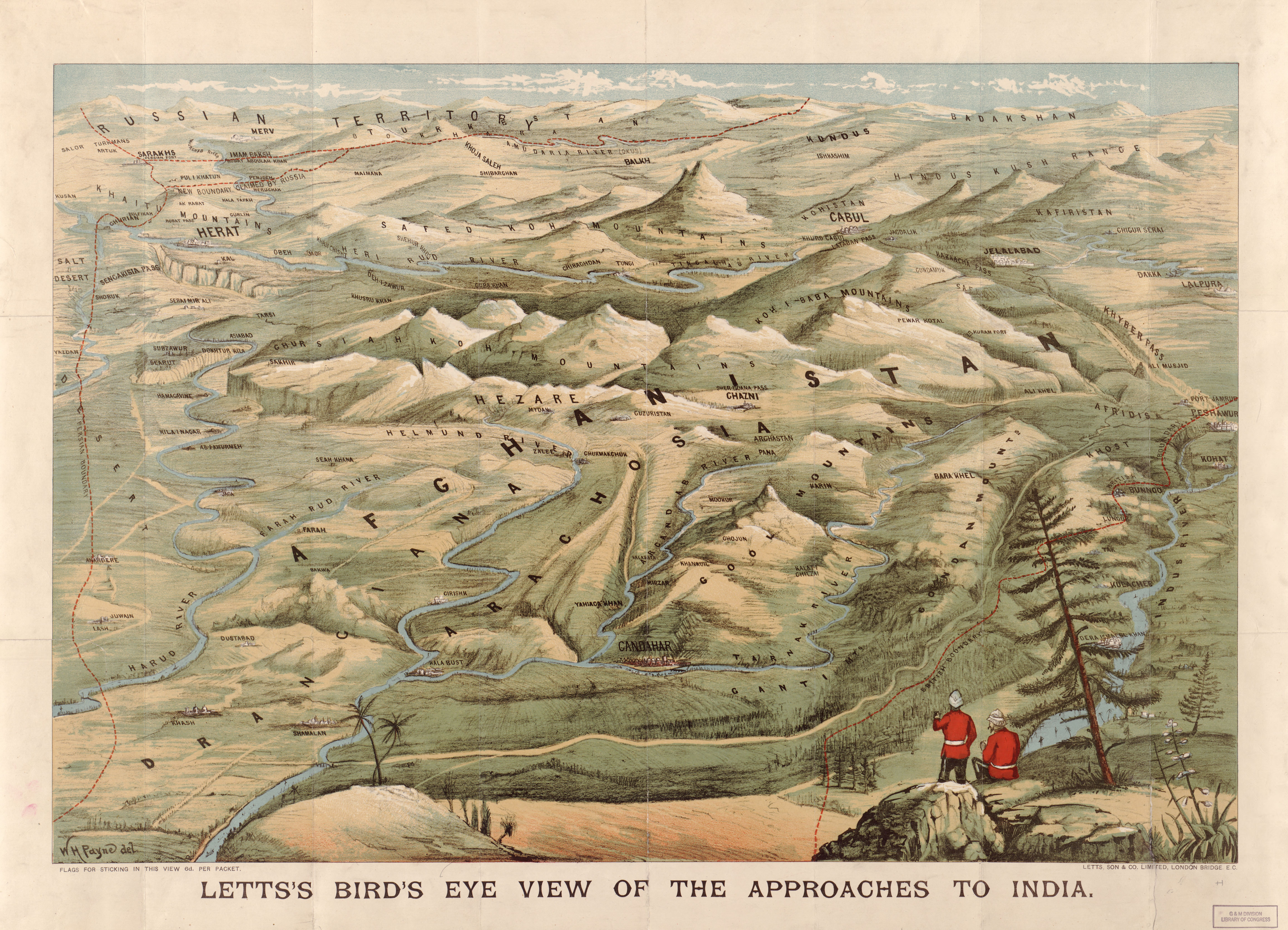
1920s bird's eye map depicting the approaches to British India through Afghanistan including then Soviet territory

Historians do not agree on dating the beginning or end of the Great Game. Konstantin Penzev believes that the Great Game commenced with Russia's victory in the Russo-Persian War (1804–1813) and the signing of the Treaty of Gulistan of 1813 or the Treaty of Turkmenchay of 1828. Edward Ingram believes that it began between 1832 and 1834 as an attempt to negotiate trade deals with Ranjit Singh and the Amirs of Sind. Hopkirk views "unofficial" British support for Circassian anti-Russian fighters in the Caucasus (c. 1836 – involving David Urquhart and (for example) the Vixen affair – in the context of the Great Game. Sergeev believes that the Great Game started in the aftermath of the Caucasus War (1828–1859) and intensified with the Crimean War (1853–1856). Edward Ingram proposes that The Great Game was over at the end of the First Anglo-Afghanistan war in 1842 with the British withdrawal from Afghanistan.

British fears ended in 1907 and the Great Game came to a close in 1907 when Britain and Russia became military allies (with France). They made three Anglo-Russian agreements which delineated spheres of interest between British India and Russian Central Asia in the borderland areas of Persia, Afghanistan, and Tibet. However historian Elena Andreeva sets the endpoint with the Bolshevik Revolution in 1917 and the temporary end of Russia's interest in Persia. Konstantin Penzev has stated, echoing Kipling's fictional summary ("When everyone is dead, the Great Game is finished. Not before."), that unofficially the Great Game in Central Asia will never end.

=== Soviet Great Game ===
According to German historian David X. Noack, the Great Game resumed from 1919 to 1933 as a conflict between Britain and the Soviet Union, with the Weimar Republic and Japan as additional players. Noack calls it a "Second Tournament of Shadows" over the territory composing the border of British India, China, the Soviet Union and Japanese Manchuria. To Britain, the Germans initially appeared to be a secret Soviet ally. In 1933–1934 it "ended with Mongolia, Soviet Central Asia, Tannu-Tuva and Xinjiang isolated from non-Soviet influence." Authors Andrei Znamenski and Alexandre Andreyev also describe the continuation of elements of the Great Game by the Soviet Union until the 1930s, focused on secret diplomacy and espionage in Tibet and Mongolia.

== Historiographical interpretations of the Great Game ==
=== Allegation that "Britain had lost the Great Game by 1842" ===
Edward Ingram proposes that Britain lost the Great Game. "The Great Game was an aspect of British history rather than international relations: the phrase describes what the British were doing, not the actions of Russians and Chinese." The Great Game was an attempt made in the 1830s by the British to impose their view on the world. If Khiva and Bukhara were to become buffer states, then trade routes to Afghanistan, as a protectorate, along the Indus and Sutlej rivers would be necessary and therefore access through the Sind and Punjab regions would be required. The Great Game began between 1832 and 1834 as an attempt to negotiate trade deals with Ranjit Singh and the Amirs of Sind, and the "first interruption of this magnificent British daydream was caused by the determination of the Amirs of Sind to be left alone." Its failure occurred at the end of the First Anglo-Afghanistan war in 1842 with the British withdrawal from Afghanistan. The failure to turn Afghanistan into a client state meant that The Great Game could not be won.

In 1889, Lord Curzon, who later became Viceroy of India (1899–1905), wrote a book on the strategic balance between the Russian and British Empires, as well as his travels on the Trans-Caspian railway.

In that book, Russia in Central Asia in 1889 & the Anglo-Russian Question, he commented:

Our relations with Afghanistan in the forty years between 1838 and 1878 were successively those of blundering interference and of unmasterly inactivity.

However, he also portrayed the great game as a then-ongoing and future event in 1889, stating:

...the Transcaspian conquests of the Czar have brought about, and the seal upon which has been set by the completion of the new railway. The power of menace, which the ability to take Herat involves, has passed from English to Russian hands; the Russian seizure of Herat is now a matter not so much of war as of time; and that the Russians will thus, without an effort, win the first hand in the great game that is destined to be played for the empire of the East.

Russia remained a focus for Curzon through and after his time as Viceroy of India.

=== "The British colluded with the Russians over Central Asia" ===
In the 1850s, Karl Marx and Friedrich Engels accused MP and PM Lord Palmerston of colluding with Russia during the Crimean War. At the time, Marx alleged that Palmerston weakened Britain's defense of the Ottoman Empire. Although this view was not otherwise widespread, the same accusation was levied by David Urquhart (1805–1877).

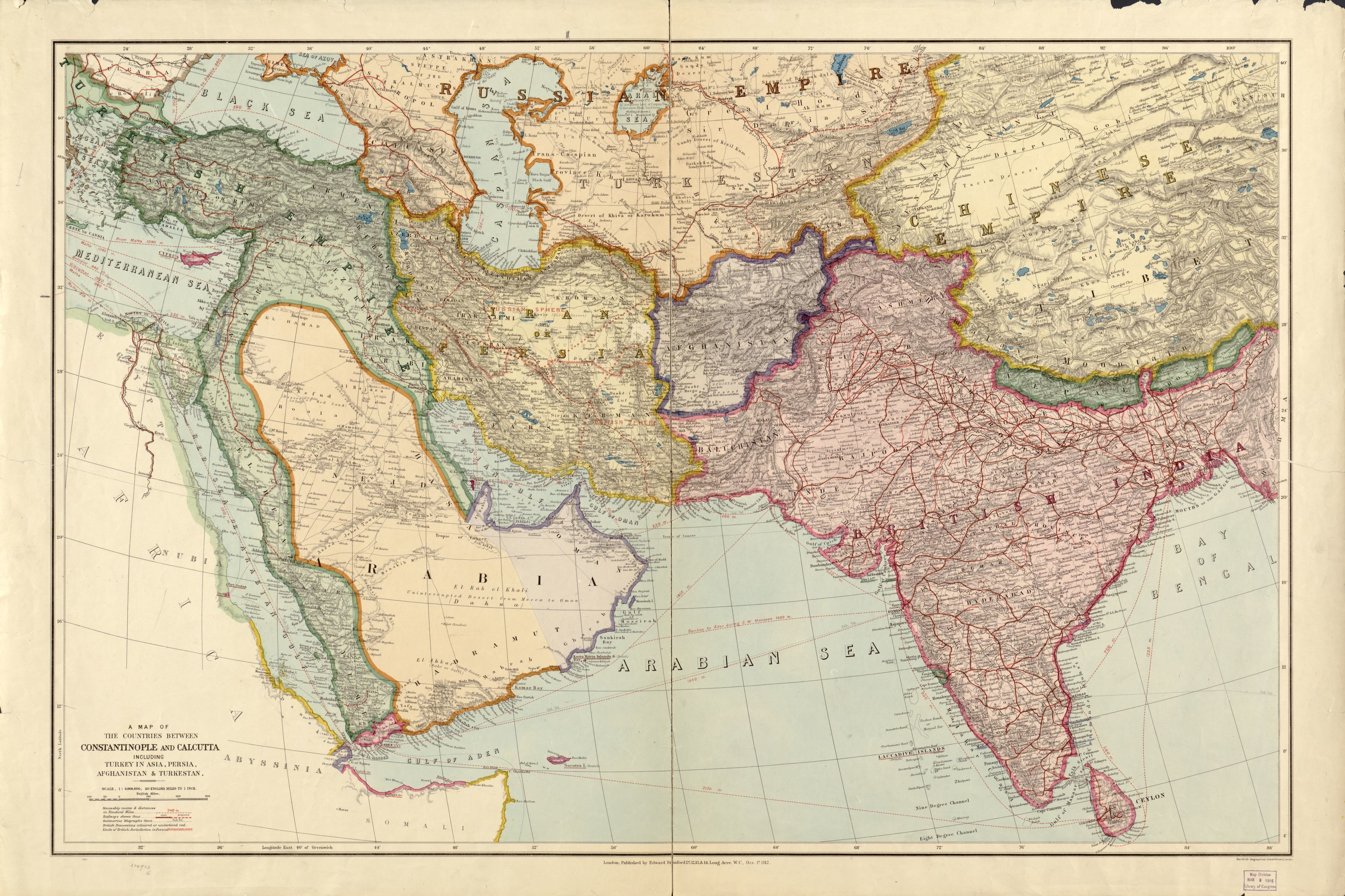
1912 map of Central and South Asia

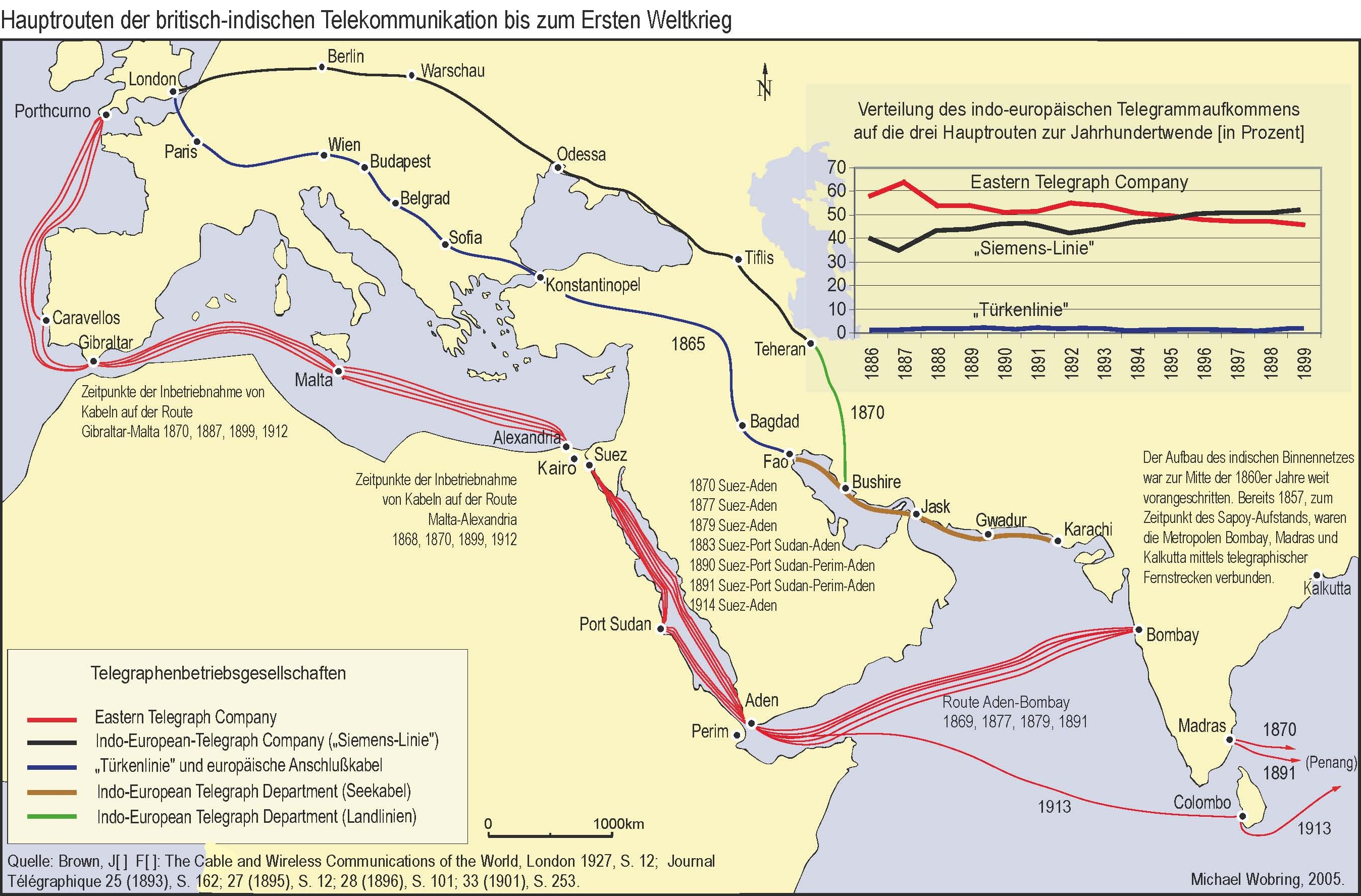
The Indo-European Telegraph Line, which allowed London to communicate with its colony in India from 1870 onward, was built through the territory of the Russian Empire, during the 'Great Game' between Russia and Britain. Nevertheless, an all-British-owned line Eastern Telegraph Company also completed its first India connection in 1870, the same year.

Mail communications between London and Calcutta could take as long as three months either way. Long-distance telegraph lines were built across Russia in the 1850s. In 1870, the Indo-European Telegraph Line was completed and it provided a communication link between London and Calcutta after passing through Russia. For the first time, the India Office within the British Foreign Office could telegraph its orders and have them acted on in a timely manner. The Government in Westminster now had complete control over foreign policy in India and the Governor-General of India lost the discretion that he once enjoyed.

In 1868, Russia moved against Bukhara and occupied Samarkand. Prince Gorchakov wrote in the Gorchakov Memorandum of 1874 that the Russian Ambassador to Britain offered an explanation that satisfied Clarendon, the British Foreign Secretary. Clarendon replied that the rapid advance of Russian troops neither alarmed nor surprised the British Government, however it did the British public and the Indian Government. Clarendon proposed a neutral zone between Britain and Russia in the region, a view that was shared by the Russian Government. This led to a confidential meeting in Wiesbaden between Clarendon and Count Brunow, the Russian Imperial Secretary.

After the signing of the Anglo-Russian Agreement of 1873 that was followed by Russia's occupation of Khiva, Gorchakov wrote in the Gorchakov Memorandum of 1874 that "Although ... the Khanate of Khiva remained entirely in our sphere of action, we thought we would make an act of courtesy of not adopting any decisive measure against Khiva before having informed Britain of it." In November 1874, Lord Augustus Loftus, British ambassador to Russia called on Russia's V. Westmann, Acting Minister for Foreign Affairs, and told him that "The advance of Russia in Central Asia of late years was a subject of watchful interest, although it was not one of either jealousy or fear to the Government of India."

In December 1874, long before Russia annexed Merv in 1884, Northbrook, the Viceroy of India, wrote to Salisbury, the Secretary of State for India, that he accepted an eventual Russian annexation of Merv. In the following year he wrote to Rawlinson, a member of the Council of India, "Our engagement with Russia with respect to the frontier of Afghanistan precludes us from promoting the incorporation of the Turkomans of Merv in the territories subject to the Ameer of Kabul". Northbrook would not accept any extension of Persia towards Merv. It has been proposed that from Sher Ali's (Afghanistan's) point of view, prior to the invasion of Afghanistan by Britain in the Second Anglo-Afghan War of 1878, that there was evidence of the beginnings of a growing understanding between Britain and Russia to divide Central Asia between themselves.

Britain and Russia officially ended their dispute with the Anglo-Russian Convention of 1907, and afterward cooperated to enforce its provisions on Qajar Iran, while covert rivalry continued.

== Effect of the Great Game on contemporary political boundaries ==
=== On India ===
Narendra Singh Sarila, aide-de-camp to Lord Louis Mountbatten, the last Viceroy of British India, in 1948 describes in his book The Shadow of the Great Game that based on his research in The Oriental and India Collection of British Library that the partition of India was partially connected to the Great Game between Britain and the USSR. He stated the following in his book:

Once the British realized that the Indian nationalists who would rule India after its independence would deny them military cooperation under a British Commonwealth defence umbrella, they settled for those willing to do so by using religion for the purpose. Their problem could be solved if Mohammad Ali Jinnah, the leader of the Muslim League Party, would succeed in his plan to detach the northwest of India abutting Iran, Afghanistan and Sinkiang and establish a separate state there – Pakistan.

Lawyer and mediator in Supreme Court of India, Aman M. Hingorani in his book Unravelling the Kashmir Knot that Winston Churchill directed War Cabinet to assess 'the long-term policy required to safeguard the strategic interests of the British Empire in India and the Indian Ocean', the report in respect of which was submitted on 19 May 1945. He states in the book:

The report emphasized that 'Britain must retain its military connection with the subcontinent so as to ward off the Soviet Union's threat to the area', citing four reasons for the 'strategic importance of India to Britain'—India's 'value as a base from which forces could be suitably deployed within the Indian Ocean area, in the Middle East and the Far East'; it serving as 'a transit point for air and sea communications'; it being 'a large reserve of manpower of good fighting quality'; and the strategic importance of the northwest region to threaten the Soviet Union.

== The Great Game as a legend ==
=== Mythologized aspects of the Great Game ===
A. Vescovi argued that Kipling's use of the term was entirely fictional, "...because the Great Game as it is described in the novel never existed; it is almost entirely Kipling's invention. At the time when the story is set (i.e. in the late Eighties), Britain did not have an intelligence service, nor an Ethnographical Department; there was only a governmental task force called 'Survey of India' that was entrusted with the task of charting all India in response to a typically English anxiety of control."

According to military history scholar Matt Salyer, the "Great Game" as a British strategy was a fiction, but the "Great Game" as a vague descriptor of various actions of multiple empires, "as far back as the Seven Years' War" is accurate. He writes that "the 'legend of the Great Game' emerged as a distinct historiographical lens after the Second World War." However, he says, "That does not mean that historians who describe trajectories of British Imperial statecraft in terms of 'the Great Game' are wrong."

Two authors, Gerald Morgan and Malcolm Yapp, have proposed that The Great Game was a legend and that the British Raj did not have the capacity to conduct such an undertaking. An examination of the archives of the various departments of the Raj showed no evidence of a British intelligence network in Central Asia. At best, efforts to obtain information on Russian moves in Central Asia were rare, ad hoc adventures and at worst intrigues resembling the adventures in Kim were baseless rumours, and that such rumours "were always common currency in Central Asia and they applied as much to Russia as to Britain". After two British representatives were executed in Bukhara in 1842, Britain actively discouraged officers from traveling in Turkestan.

Gerald Morgan also proposed that Russia never had the will nor ability to move on India, nor India the capability to move on Central Asia. Russia did not want Afghanistan, considering their initial failure to take Khiva and the British debacle in the First Anglo-Afghan War. To invade Afghanistan they would first require a forward base in Khorasan, Persia. St. Petersburg had decided by then that a forward policy in the region had failed but one of non-intervention appeared to work.

Sneh Manajan wrote that the Russian military advances in Central Asia were advocated and executed only by irresponsible Russians or enthusiastic governors of the frontier provinces. Robert Middleton suggested that The Great Game was all a figment of the over-excited imaginations of a few jingoist politicians, military officers and journalists on both sides. The use of the term The Great Game to describe Anglo-Russian rivalry in Central Asia became common only after the Second World War. It was rarely used before that period. Malcolm Yapp proposed that some Britons had used the term "The Great Game" in the late 19th century to describe several different things in relation to its interests in Asia, but the primary concern of British authorities in India was the control of the indigenous population and not preventing a Russian invasion.

Robert Irwin argues the Great Game was certainly perceived by both British and Russian adventurers at the time, but was played up by more expansionist factions for power politics in Europe. Irwin states that "Prince Ukhtomsky might rail against the corrupting effects of British rule over India and declare that there could be no frontiers for the Russians in Asia, but Russian policy was usually decided by saner heads. Canny statesmen such as Witte sanctioned the despatch of diplomatic missions, explorers and spies into Afghanistan and Tibet, but they did so to extort concessions from the British in Europe. Whitehall, on the other hand, was reluctant to have its foreign policy in Europe dictated to by the Raj."

According to historian Patrikeeff, the concept of the Great Game was also applied, possibly inaccurately, to Northeast Asia to describe Russia and Japan's contest over Manchuria – which took the form of the Russian invasion of Manchuria, Russo-Japanese War, and part of the Russian Civil War – and perhaps had similar ideological underpinnings to start with. However, unlike the British-Russian Great Game in South and West Asia, where clear-cut spheres of influence were established, Patrikeeff says that this supposed Great Game in Northeast Asia ignored that economic dominance did not follow political (with Japan's victory in Manchuria not fully ousting the Russian concessions such as the CER) and that centuries-old distinct traditions such as the Qing legacy there led to key differences. Nonetheless, ancient and even mythic appeals to legitimacy were used by exiled supporters of empire, such as Baron Roman von Ungern-Sternberg's attempt at reviving a 'new Mongolian khanate'. Whereas the Great Game between Russia and Britain was codifying imperial spheres of influence at their frontiers, the supposed Great Game between Russia and Japan did not end up in a similarly defined frontier, with warlord states and Honghuzi emerging through the period.

=== Role of legends and mysticism in the Great Game ===
Several scholars have focused on the role of legends and mysticism (sometimes interpreted as a form of Orientalism that was prominent in the late 19th and early 20th century), during the Great Game and in its aftermath.

Some writers such as Karl Meyer and Shareen Brysac have connected the Great Game to earlier and later expeditions in Inner Asia, predominantly those expeditions by British, Russian, and German orientalists. Robert Irwin summarizes the expeditions as "William Moorcroft, the horse doctor with a mission to find new stock for the cavalry in British India; Charles Metcalfe, the advocate of a forward policy on the frontier in the early 19th century; Alexander 'Bokhara' Burnes, the foolhardy political officer, who perished at the hands of an Afghan mob; Sir William Hay Macnaghten, the head of the ill-fated British Mission in Kabul (and a scholar who produced an important edition of The Arabian Nights); Nikolai Przhevalsky, the explorer who gave his name to a hard-to-spell horse; Francis Younghusband, the mystical imperialist; Aurel Stein, the manuscript hunter; Sven Hedin, the Nazi sympathiser who seems to have regarded Asian exploration as a proving ground for the superman; Nicholas Roerich, the artist and barmy quester after the fabled hidden city of Shambhala."

The founder of Theosophy, esotericist Helena Blavatsky, has also been connected to the Great Game, with her Himalayas-inspired Western mysticism both critiquing, and falling for, two forms of Orientalism by the British and Russian Empires, as they competed to define and claim "the Orient". Blavatsky would be referenced by the poet Velimir Khlebnikov, who argued that Britain and Russia had both taken traits from the Kazan Khanate and Mongol Empire respectively, in their colonial struggle over Asia. Blavatsky would also refer to Russia's double-layered conception of itself as a European power in contrast to Asia as well as an empire based in Asia; meanwhile, she would also "consciously appropriate" British rhetoric on Russia in labelling herself a "Russian savage". Both Blavatsky and Khlebnikov claimed Kalmyk ancestry in imitation of the traditionally nomadic culture. Scholar Anindita Banerjee argued this shows a "deconstruction" of national identities by identifying with a "religious, geographic, and ethnic other", relevant to the diversity of Central Asia and India and the frontier that existed between the British and Russian Empires.

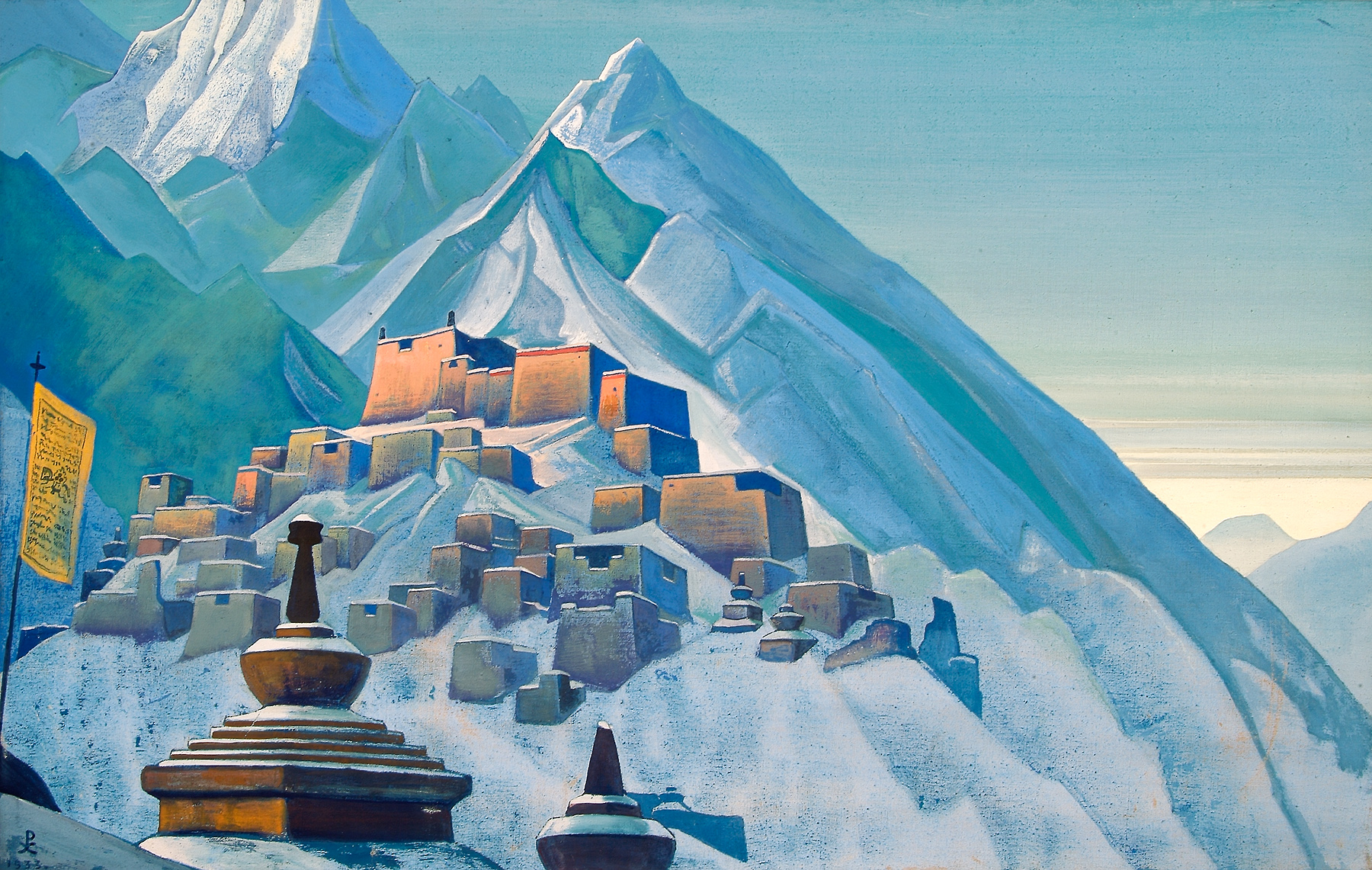
1933 painting by Russian explorer Nicholas Roerich, Tibet. Himalayas.

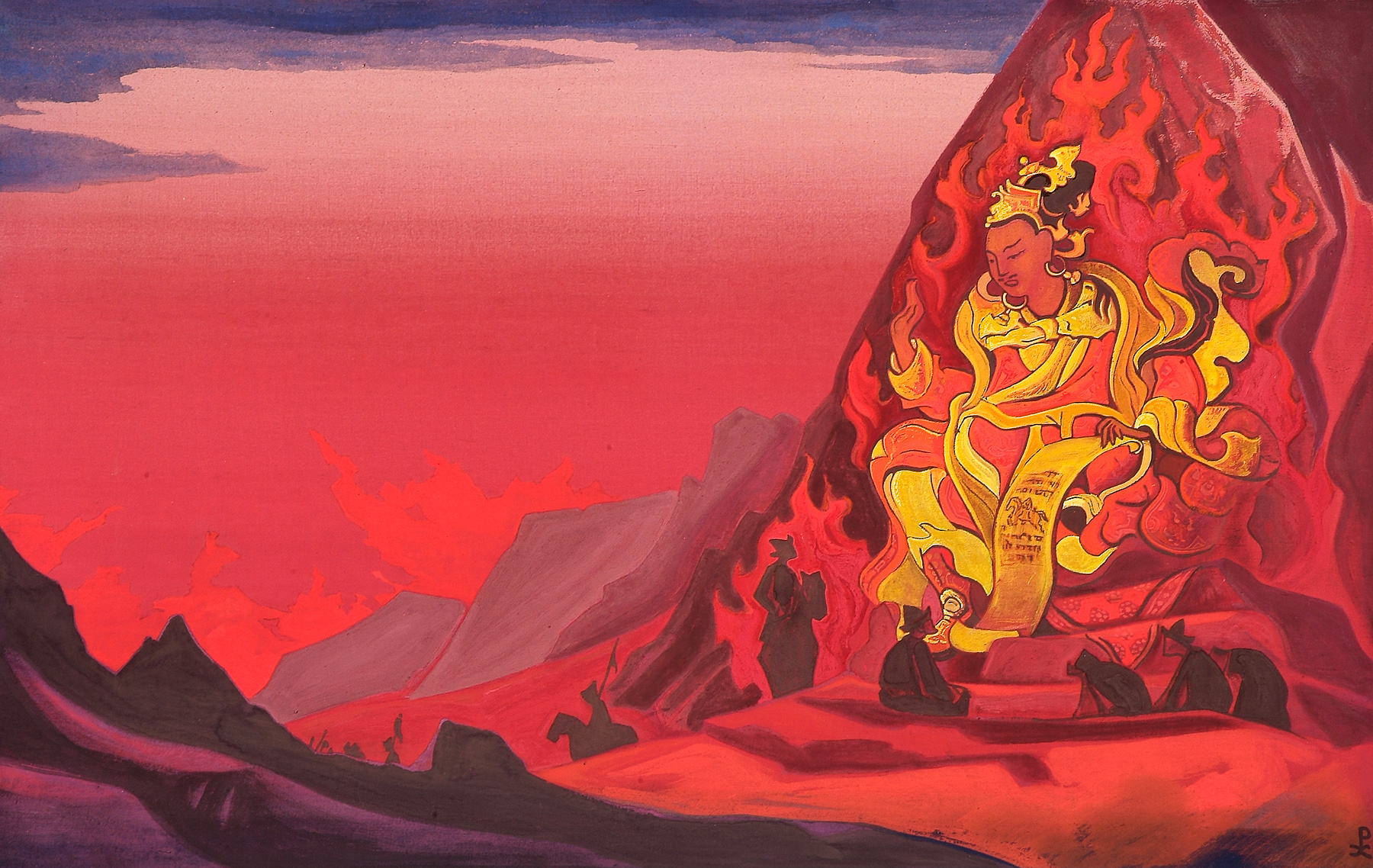
1924 or 1927 painting by Russian explorer Nicholas Roerich, Command of Rigden Djapo

According to the scholar Andrei Znamenski, Soviet Communists of the 1920s aimed to extend their influence over Mongolia and Tibet, using the mythical Buddhist kingdom of Shambhala as a form of propaganda to further this mission, in a sort of "great Bolshevik game". The expedition of Russian symbolist Nicholas Roerich has been put in context of the Great Game due to his interest in Tibet, Although Roerich did not like the Communists, he agreed to help Soviet intelligence and influence operations due to a shared paranoia towards Britain, as well as his goal to form a "Sacred Union of the East" Jan Morris states that "Roerich brought the bewilderments of the later Great Game to America" through mysticism movements called Roerichism.

In the early 1920s, Roerich asserted that beings from an esoteric Buddhist community in India told him that Russia was destined for a mission on Earth. That led Roerich to formulate his "Great Plan," which envisaged the unification of millions of Asian peoples through a religious movement using the Future Buddha, or Maitreya, into a "Second Union of the East." There, the King of Shambhala would, following the Maitreya prophecies, make his appearance to fight a great battle against all evil forces on Earth. Roerich understood that as "perfection towards Common Good." The new polity was to include southwestern Altai, Tuva, Buryatia, Outer and Inner Mongolia, Xinjiang, and Tibet, with its capital in "Zvenigorod," the "City of Tolling Bells," which was to be built at the foot of Mount Belukha, in Altai. According to Roerich, the same Mahatmas revealed to him in 1922 that he was an incarnation of the Fifth Dalai Lama.

== Other uses of the term "Great Game" ==
The Soviet invasion of Afghanistan invited comparisons to the Great Game in the 1980s. In particular, Britain's covert operation to support the Afghan mujahideen fighting the Soviets became known as the 'Second Great Game'.

Concerns of resource scarcity emerged once again in the 1990s, and with it the hope that the newly independent states of Central Asia and the Caucasus would provide a resource boom – the new "Persian Gulf" – and with it competition for oil and gas in a 21st-century version of the Great Game. These expectations were not supported by the facts, and came with an exaggeration of the region's commercial and geopolitical value. Since that time, some journalists have used the expression The New Great Game to describe what they proposed was a renewed geopolitical interest in Central Asia because of the mineral wealth of the region, which was at that time becoming more available to foreign investment after the end of the Soviet Union. One journalist linked the term to an interest in the region's minerals and another to its minerals and energy. The interest in oil and gas includes pipelines that transmit energy to China's east coast. One view of the New Great Game is a shift to geoeconomic compared to geopolitical competition. Xiangming Chen believes that "China and Russia are the two dominant power players vs. the weaker independent Central Asian states".

Other authors have criticized the reuse of the term "Great Game". It may imply that Central Asian states are entirely the pawns of larger states, when this ignores the potentially counterbalancing factors. According to strategic analyst Ajay Patnaik, the "New Great Game" is a misnomer, because rather than two empires focused on the region as in the past, there are now many global and regional powers active with the rise of China and India as major economic powers. Central Asian states have diversified their political, economic, and security relationships. David Gosset of CEIBS Shanghai states "the Shanghai Cooperation Organization (SCO) established in 2001 is showing that Central Asia's actors have gained some real degree of independence. But fundamentally, the China factor introduces a level of predictability." In the 2015 international relations book Globalizing Central Asia, the authors state that Central Asian states have pursued a multivectored approach in balancing out the political and economic interests of larger powers, but it has had mixed success due to strategic reversals of administrations regarding the West, China, and Russia. They suppose that China could balance out Russia. However, Russia and China have a strategic partnership since 2001. According to Ajay Patnaik, "China has advanced carefully in the region, using the SCO as the main regional mechanism, but never challenging Russian interests in Central Asia." In the Carnegie Endowment, Paul Stronski and Nicole Ng wrote in 2018 that China has not fundamentally challenged any Russian interests in Central Asia. They suggested that China, Russia, and the West could have mutual interests in regional stability in Central Asia.

The Great Game has been described as a cliché-metaphor, and there are authors who have now written on the topics of "the Great Game" in Antarctica, the world's far north, and in outer space.

== See also ==
- Bibliography of the history of Central Asia
- Geostrategy in Central Asia
- New Great Game
- Russian conquest of Central Asia (a longer history including the Great Game)
- The Great Game (Hopkirk book)

== Sources ==
- Becker, Seymour (2005), Russia's Protectorates in Central Asia: Bukhara and Khiva, 1865–1924 (PDF), RoutledgeCurzon, London, ISBN 978-0415328036, archived from the original (PDF) on 10 October 2016
- Ewans, Martin (2002), Afghanistan: A Short History of Its People and Politics, HarperCollins, ISBN 978-0060505080
- Ewans, Martin (2004), The Great Game: Britain and Russia in Central Asia, Volume 1, Documents, RoutledgeCurzon, Oxon. UK, ISBN 978-0415316392, archived from the original on 24 January 2023
- Ewans, Martin (2012), Securing the Indian Frontier in Central Asia: Confrontation and Negotiation, 1865–1895, RoutledgeCurzon, Oxon. UK, ISBN 978-0415316392, archived from the original on 24 January 2023
- Imperial Gazetteer of India vol. IV (1908), The Indian Empire, Administrative, Published under the authority of His Majesty's Secretary of State for India in Council, Oxford at the Clarendon Press. Pp. xxx, 1 map, 552
- Mahajan, Sneh (2001), British Foreign Policy 1874–1914: The Role of India (PDF), Routledge, ISBN 9780415260107, archived from the original (PDF) on 10 October 2016
- Morgan, Gerald (1973), "Myth and Reality in the Great Game", Asian Affairs, 4 (1): 55–65, doi:10.1080/03068377308729652
- Morgan, Gerald (1981), Anglo-Russian Rivalry in Central Asia: 1810–1895, Epilogue by Lt. Col. (retd) Geoffrey Wheeler, Routledge, London, ISBN 978-0714631790
- Yapp, Malcolm (16 May 2000), "The Legend of the Great Game" (PDF), Proceedings of the British Academy: 2000 Lectures and Memoirs, vol. 111, Oxford University Press, pp. 179–198, archived (PDF) from the original on 1 September 2022
