= Foundations of Geopolitics =

1997 geopolitical book by Aleksandr Dugin

The Foundations of Geopolitics: The Geopolitical Future of Russia
- Russian edition cover
- Author: Aleksandr Dugin
- Original title: Основы геополитики
- Language: Russian
- Publisher: Arktogeja
- Publication date: 1997
- Publication place: Russia
- ISBN: 978-5-8592-8019-3

The Foundations of Geopolitics: The Geopolitical Future of Russia (Russian: Основы геополитики: геополитическое будущее России) is a geopolitical book by Aleksandr Dugin. Its publication in 1997 was well received in Russia; it has had significant influence within the Russian military, police forces, and foreign policy elites, and has been used as a textbook in the Academy of the General Staff of the Russian military. Powerful Russian political figures subsequently took an interest in Dugin, a Russian political analyst who espouses an ultra-nationalist and far-right ideology based on his idea of neo-Eurasianism, who has developed a close relationship with Russia's Academy of the General Staff.

Dugin credits General Nikolai Klokotov of the Academy of the General Staff as co-author and his main inspiration, though Klokotov denies this. Colonel General Leonid Ivashov, head of the International Department of the Russian Ministry of Defence, helped draft the book.

== Policy usage ==
Klokotov stated that in the future the book would "serve as a mighty ideological foundation for preparing a new military command". Dugin has asserted that the book has been adopted as a textbook in many Russian educational institutions. Former speaker of the Russian State Duma, Gennadiy Seleznyov, for whom Dugin was adviser on geopolitics, "urged that Dugin's geopolitical doctrine be made a compulsory part of the school curriculum".

=== Eurasianist foreign policy doctrine ===
Eurasianist sentiments have been on the rise across Russian society since the ascent of Vladimir Putin in the country. In a poll conducted by Levada Center in 2021, 64% of Russian citizens identify Russia as a non-European country; while only 29% regarded Russia to be part of Europe.

In 2023, Russia adopted a Eurasianist, anti-Western foreign policy in a document titled "The Concept of the Foreign Policy of the Russian Federation", approved by Vladimir Putin. The document defines Russia as a "unique country-civilisation and a vast Eurasian and Euro-Pacific power" that seeks to create a "Greater Eurasian Partnership" by pursuing close relations with China, India, countries of the Islamic world and the rest of the Global South (Latin America and Southern Africa). The policy identifies United States and other Anglo-Saxon countries as "the main inspirer, organiser, and executor of the aggressive anti-Russian policy of the collective West" and seeks the end of geopolitical U.S. dominance in the international scene. The document also adopts a neo-Soviet posture, positioning Russia as the successor state of USSR and calls for spreading "accurate information" about the "decisive contribution of the Soviet Union" in shaping the post-WWII international order and the United Nations.

== Content ==
In Foundations of Geopolitics, Dugin makes a distinction between "Atlantic" and "Eurasian" societies, which means, as Benjamin R. Teitelbaum describes it: "between societies whose coastal geographical position made them cosmopolitan and landlocked societies oriented toward preservation and cohesion". Dugin calls for the "Atlantic societies", primarily represented by the United States, to lose their broader geopolitical influence in Eurasia, and for Russia to rebuild its influence through annexations and alliances.

The book declares that "the battle for the world rule of Russians" has not ended and Russia remains "the staging area of a new anti-bourgeois, anti-U.S. revolution". The Eurasian Empire will be constructed "on the fundamental principle of the common enemy: the rejection of Atlanticism, strategic control of the U.S., and the refusal to allow liberal values to dominate us." Dugin seems not to rule out the possibility of Russia joining and/or even supporting the European Union and NATO instrumentally in a pragmatic way of further Western subversion against geopolitical "Americanism".

Outside of Ukraine and Georgia, military operations play a relatively minor role except for the military intelligence operations. The textbook advocates a sophisticated program of subversion, destabilisation, and disinformation spearheaded by the Russian secret services. The operations should be assisted by a tough, hard-headed utilization of Russia's gas, oil, and natural resources to bully and pressure other countries. The book states that "the maximum task [of the future] is the 'Finlandisation' of all of Europe".

=== In Europe ===
- Germany should be offered the de facto political dominance over most Protestant and Catholic states located within Central and Eastern Europe. The Kaliningrad Oblast could be given back to Germany. The book uses the term "Moscow–Berlin axis".
- France should be encouraged to form a bloc with Germany, as they both have a "firm anti-Atlanticist tradition".
- The United Kingdom, merely described as an "extraterritorial floating base of the U.S.", should be cut off from the European Union.
- Finland should be absorbed into Russia. Southern Finland will be combined with the Republic of Karelia and northern Finland will be "donated to Murmansk Oblast".
- Estonia should be given to Germany's sphere of influence.
- Latvia and Lithuania should be given a "special status" in the Eurasian–Russian sphere, although he later writes that they should be integrated into Russia rather than obtaining national independence.
- Georgia should be dismembered. Abkhazia and "United Ossetia" (which includes Georgia's South Ossetia and the Republic of North Ossetia) will be incorporated into Russia. Georgia's independent policies are unacceptable.
- Belarus and Moldova are to become part of Russia, not independent.
- Poland should be granted a "special status" in the Eurasian sphere. This may involve splitting Poland between German and Russian spheres of influence.
- Romania, North Macedonia, Serbia, "Serbian Bosnia", and Greece – "Orthodox Christian collectivist East" – will unite with "Moscow the Third Rome" and reject the "rational-individualistic West".
- Ukraine (except Western Ukraine) should be annexed by Russia because "Ukraine as a state has no geopolitical meaning, no particular cultural import or universal significance, no geographic uniqueness, no ethnic exclusiveness, its certain territorial ambitions represents an enormous danger for all of Eurasia and, without resolving the Ukrainian problem, it is in general senseless to speak about continental politics". Ukraine should not be allowed to remain independent, unless it is cordon sanitaire, which would be inadmissible according to Western political standards. As mentioned, Western Ukraine (comprising the regions of Volynia, Galicia, and Transcarpathia), considering its Catholic-majority population, are permitted to form an independent federation of Western Ukraine but should not be under Atlanticist control.

=== In the Middle East and Central Asia ===
- The book stresses the "continental Russian–Islamic alliance" which lies "at the foundation of anti-Atlanticist strategy". The alliance is based on the "traditional character of Russian and Islamic civilization".
- Iran is a key ally. The book uses the term "Moscow–Tehran axis".
- Armenia has a special role: It will serve as a "strategic base," and it is necessary to create "the [subsidiary] axis Moscow-Yerevan-Teheran". Armenians "are an Aryan people ... [like] the Iranians and the Kurds".
- Azerbaijan could be "split up" or given to Iran.
- Russia needs to create "geopolitical shocks" within Turkey. These can be achieved by employing Kurds, Armenians, and other minorities (such as Greeks) to attack the ruling Turkish regime.
- The book regards the Caucasus as a Russian territory, including "the eastern and northern shores of the Caspian (the territories of Kazakhstan and Turkmenistan)" and Central Asia (mentioning Kazakhstan, Uzbekistan, Kyrgyzstan, and Tajikistan).

=== In East and Southeast Asia ===
- Dugin envisions the fall of China. The People's Republic of China, which represents a geopolitical danger to the independent Russian Federation, "must, to the maximum degree possible, be dismantled". Dugin suggests that Russia start by taking Tibet–Xinjiang–Inner Mongolia–Manchuria as a security belt. Russia should offer China help "in a southern direction – Indochina (except Vietnam, whose people is already pro-Russia), the Philippines, Indonesia, Australia" as geopolitical compensation. In a 2022 article, SCMP writes, "He also expressed concern that China would act as a servant for U.S.-'imperialism' but in recent years he has come to admire the country for becoming 'so powerful, so independent, so sovereign'". Temur Umarov, a specialist in China-Russia relations at the Carnegie Endowment for International Peace, a Washington-based think tank, states "Dugin says that he became fascinated with China when he saw that Beijing, unlike Moscow, does not even think about living in a Western-dominated world," further going on to say "Dugin claims that the Chinese political regime takes from the West only those features that strengthen the regime and allows its power to grow, and that it hasn't fallen into the Western influence, [becoming] another centre in the geopolitical arena contrary to the West".
- Russia should manipulate Japanese politics by offering the Kuril Islands to Japan and provoking anti-U.S. sentiments, to "be a friend of Japan".
- Mongolia should be absorbed into the Eurasian sphere.

The book emphasises that Russia must spread geopolitical anti-U.S. sentiment everywhere: "the main 'scapegoat' will be precisely the U.S."

=== In the Americas ===
In the Americas:

- Russia should use its special services within the borders of the United States and Canada to fuel instability and separatism against neoliberal globalist Western hegemony, such as, for instance, provoke "Afro-American racists" to create severe backlash against the rotten political state of affairs in the current present-day system of the United States and Canada. Russia should "introduce geopolitical disorder into internal U.S. activity, encouraging all kinds of separatism and ethnic, social, and racial conflicts, actively supporting all dissident movements – extremist, racist, and sectarian groups, thus destabilising internal political processes in the U.S. It would also make sense simultaneously to support isolationist tendencies in U.S. politics".
- The Eurasian Project could be expanded to Central and South America.

== Reception and impact ==
Hoover Institution senior fellow John B. Dunlop stated that "the impact of this intended 'Eurasianist' textbook on key Russian elites testifies to the worrisome rise of neo-fascist ideas and sentiments during the late Yeltsin and the Putin period". Historian Timothy D. Snyder wrote in The New York Review of Books that Foundations of Geopolitics is influenced by the work of Carl Schmitt, a proponent of a conservative international order whose work influenced the Nazis. He also noted Dugin's key role in forwarding the ideologies of Eurasianism and National Bolshevism.

The book was described by Foreign Policy as "one of the most curious, impressive, and terrifying books to come out of Russia during the entire post-Soviet era", and "more sober than Dugin's previous books, better argued, and shorn of occult references, numerology, traditionalism and other eccentric metaphysics". In 2022, Foreign Policy also noted: "The recent invasion of Ukraine is a continuation of a Dugin-promoted strategy for weakening the international liberal order." According to Anton Shekhovtsov, the book's cover contains a depiction of a Chaos Star, a symbol that represents chaos magick in modern occult movements, and the use of the symbol aligns with Dugin's general interest in the occult and occult symbolism. After the publication of the book, Dugin has also used the symbol as the logo of his Eurasia Party.

== See also ==
=== Related topics ===
- 2014 pro-Russian unrest in Ukraine
- Accession of Ukraine to the European Union
- Annexation of Crimea by the Russian Federation
- Anti-war protests in Russia (2022–present)
- Derussification in Ukraine
- Geopolitics of Russia
  - All-Russian nation
  - Eurasianism
  - Moscow, third Rome
  - Opposition to the Euromaidan
  - Russian separatist forces in Ukraine
  - Russian world
  - Ruscism
- International recognition of the Donetsk People's Republic and the Luhansk People's Republic
- Krasovsky case
- Media portrayal of the Russo-Ukrainian War
- Russian imperialism
- Russian irredentism
- Russian nationalism
- Ukraine–NATO relations
- War crimes in the Russian invasion of Ukraine
  - Allegations of genocide of Ukrainians in the Russo-Ukrainian War
  - Bucha massacre
  - Child abductions in the Russo-Ukrainian War

=== Related literature ===
- "Address concerning the events in Ukraine", 2022 speech by Vladimir Putin
- "On the Historical Unity of Russians and Ukrainians", 2021 essay by Putin
- "On conducting a special military operation", 2022 speech by Putin
- "What Russia Should Do with Ukraine", 2022 article by Timofey Sergeytsev
- "Where have you been for eight years?", a phrase used during the 2022 Russian invasion of Ukraine
