= Conspirology (Dugin) =

Term coined by Aleksandr Dugin

Conspirology is a term the Russian philosopher Aleksandr Dugin coined in his work Konspirologiya: Nauka o zagovorah, tajnyh obshhestvah i okkultnoj vojne (Conspirology: The science of conspiracy theories, secret services, and occult war). Accordingly, it is a framework which studies conspiracy theories, secret societies, and their geopolitical conflicts, from the perspective of esoteric thought, non-Catholic eschatology, demonology, and the occult, as opposed to religious studies. Dugin primarily uses it to cover the conflict between what he considers to be Atlanticism (Anglosaxon/American-English geopolitics) and Eurasianism (Neosoviet geopolitics).

Because of the reliance on esoteric and occult teachings, as opposed to religious studies, and its geopolitical tint, it is considered to be pseudoscientific, especially in Europe, and America.
