= Avigdor Eskin =

Russian-Israeli journalist and political activist

- Авигдор Эскин
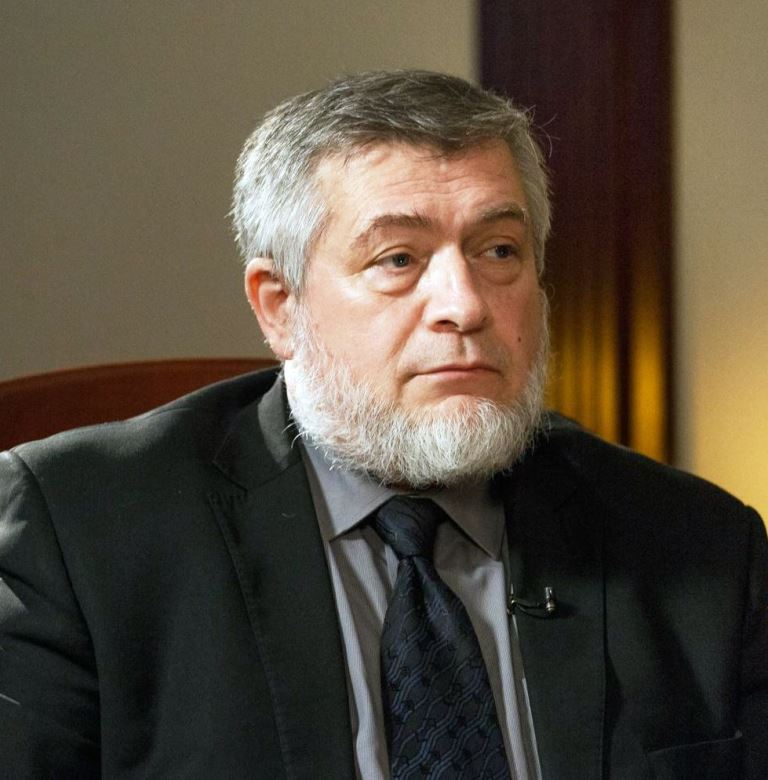
- Born: Victor Valeryevich Eskin; April 26, 1960 (age 66); Moscow, Soviet Union
- Known for: Activism

Avigdor Eskin (Russian: Авигдор Эскин, Hebrew: אביגדור אסקין; born 26 April 1960) is a Russian-Israeli conservative journalist and political activist. Born in Moscow in the Soviet Union, Eskin emigrated to Israel where he became involved in right-wing politics. He currently resides in Jerusalem.

== Early life ==
Avigdor Eskin was born as Victor Valeryevich Eskin in Moscow in 1960. His father was from an assimilated Jewish family. His mother was a Ukrainian who was not considered a Jew under Orthodox Jewish law, but may have had Jewish roots. When he was 11 years old, he began taking an interest in his Jewish identity after his grandmother told him about the Holocaust, and was further inspired by a religious Catholic friend. He began illicitly listening to Western radio stations such as Voice of America, Kol Israel, and the BBC Russian Service, and attending synagogue. He converted to Judaism soon afterward. He became an Orthodox Jew and committed Zionist.

Despite harassment by the KGB, Eskin participated in Zionist activities. He became the youngest underground Hebrew teacher in the Soviet Union (which was illegal at the time), and translated right-wing radical Meir Kahane's Never Again manifesto into Russian. Eskin also became determined to emigrate to Israel, and was granted an exit visa in 1978. He emigrated to Israel in January 1979 at the age of 18. Years later, Eskin's mother and sisters immigrated to Israel. In Israel, Eskin did military service in the Israel Defense Forces as part of the Hesder program, which combines regular military service with religious studies.

== Political activities ==
Eskin was a founder of Israeli New Right movement together with the former MK Michael Kleiner and was behind the alliance between the Israeli right and American conservatives, led by senator Jesse Helms. Additionally, he organised the arms supply to the anti-communist guerrillas in Nicaragua. The most controversial of his activities was his support of the White regime in South Africa due to its staunch anti-communist politics, until its collapse in the early 1990s.

Eskin lead many demonstrations against Prime Minister Yitzak Rabin in 1995, in response to the Oslo Accords. He was among the most vocal protesters against the Oslo accords.

In May 2005, Eskin won a slander case that he filed against Barry Chamish. He later described Chamish as "heavy drinking person, who sucked his theories from the bottle".

On the 2nd of February, 2017, Eskin put out an article stating that he knew employees of a private intelligence firm Jellyfish formed by former Blackwater employees having had made contact with Michael Flynn.

=== Feud with Avigdor Lieberman ===
Eskin was actively involved in public criticism against the leader of Israel Beteynu party and later Finance Minister Avigdor Lieberman. This was part of a long-running feud between Avigdor Eskin and Avigdor Lieberman—with Eskin describing Lieberman as a "leftist".

=== Russia and Ukraine ===
Since 2014 Eskin has actively shared Russian propaganda against the Euromaidan revolution, and attempted to rally Knesset against supporting it. Since the start of the War in Donbas he continued to make false claims of antisemitism in Ukraine.

Eskin frequently lectures in Israel, in Europe and in Russia on political science and theological matters. He is liked within the conservative circles around the world, due to his staunch support of right-wing causes, and pro-life agenda. Eskin has close ties to leading Israeli conservatives such as the Likud's Michael Kleiner and Otzma Yehudit MK Itamar Ben-Gvir.

Eskin has close ties to Russian political analyst Aleksandr Dugin, having previously served on the central committee of Dugin's Eurasia Party.

In May 2018 Ukraine has forbidden entry for three years with blocking of the right to dispose of assets and the belonging property.

=== South Africa ===
Eskin is active in South African politics, frequently visiting the country, and working as an activist for Afrikaner separatists' rights. In this role, he has caused diplomatic incidents, notably when describing Desmond Tutu as a fascist who is oppressing the Afrikaner people. The statement released in this regard was put out jointly with Dan Roodt, who is separately documented as having associations with the Swedish Resistance Movement.
