= Eurasia Party =

Political party in Russia

Eurasia Party Партия «Евразия»
- Leader: Aleksandr Dugin
- Founded: 21 June 2002; 24 years ago
- Split from: National Bolshevik Party
- Headquarters: Moscow, Russia
- Newspaper: Eurasian Review
- Youth wing: Eurasian Youth Union
- Ideology: Fourth Political Theory; Eurasianism; National Bolshevism; Russian irredentism; Traditionalism; Anti-Atlanticism
- Political position: Syncretic
- Religion: Russian Orthodoxy; Old-Rite
- National affiliation: Eurasia Movement; Rodina (2003)
- International affiliation: International Eurasian Movement
- Colours: Black; Blue
- Seats in the State Duma: 0 / 450

Party flag

Website
- eurasia.com.ru

The Eurasia Party (Russian: Партия «Евразия», romanized: Partiya «Yevraziya») is a neo-Eurasianist Russian political party. It was registered by the Ministry of Justice on 21 June 2002, approximately one year after the pan-Russian Eurasia Movement was established by Aleksandr Dugin.

== History and origins ==
Often seen to be a form of National Bolshevism, one of the basic ideas that underpin Eurasian theories is that Moscow, Berlin and Paris form a natural geopolitical axis because a line or axis from Moscow to Berlin will pass through the vicinity of Paris if extended. Dugin and his Eurasia Party foresee an eternal world conflict between land and sea, between the United States and Russia. He believes: "In principle, Eurasia and our space, the heartland (Russia), remain the staging area of a new anti-bourgeois, anti-American revolution". According to Dugin's book The Basics of Geopolitics (1997): "The new Eurasian empire will be constructed on the fundamental principle of the common enemy: the rejection of Atlanticism, strategic control of the USA, and the refusal to allow liberal values to dominate us. This common civilisational impulse will be the basis of a political and strategic union". The party has been deemed neo-fascist by critics, a label Dugin denies.

The Eurasia Party was founded by Dugin shortly before George W. Bush's visit to Russia at the end of May 2002. The party hopes to play a key role in attempts to resolve the Chechen problem, with the objective of setting the stage for Dugin's dream of a Russian strategic alliance with European and Middle Eastern states, primarily Iran and states like Germany.

=== Eurasia Movement ===
The Eurasia Party is affiliated with the Eurasia Movement, a National Bolshevik Russian political movement founded in 2001 by the political scientist Aleksandr Dugin. The movement follows the neo-Eurasian ideology, which adopts an eclectic mixture of Russian patriotism, Orthodox faith, anti-modernism, and even some Bolshevik ideas. It opposes "American" values such as liberalism, capitalism, and modernism.

Alexander Dugin, an exponent of neo-Eurasianism, initially followed the ideology of National Bolshevism. Expanding out of National Bolshevism, he brought into the existing ideology of Eurasianism the idea of a "third position" (a combination of capitalism and socialism), geopolitics (Eurasia as a tellurocracy, opposing the "Atlantic Anglo-Saxon thalassocracy" of the United States and NATO) and Russian conservatism and Stalinism (the Soviet Union as a major Eurasian power). In Dugin's works, Eurasian concepts and provisions are intertwined with the concepts of European New Right. Researchers note that in the formulation of philosophical problems and political projects, he significantly deviates from classical Eurasianism, which is presented in his numerous works very selectively, eclectically. In Dugin's version of neo-Eurasianism, the Russian ethnos is considered "the most priority Eurasian ethnos", which must fulfill the civilizational mission of forming a Eurasian empire that will occupy the entire continent. The main threat is declared by the United States and the English-speaking world in general under a "neo-liberal" ideology he calls "Atlanticism". His most preferred form of government is a Russian dictatorship and a totalitarian state with complete ideological control over society. In the 1990s, Dugin criticized Italian fascism and German Nazism as "not enough fascist" and accused China of anti-Russian subversion. In subsequent years, he abandoned direct apology for fascism and called for collaboration with China, and began to refer to his positions as being from the traditions of the conservative revolution and National Bolshevism. However, researchers typically refer to neo-Eurasianism (also known Fourth Political Theory and Duginism) as a form of fascism.

== Ideology ==
Dugin states that the Eurasia Party is developing the foundations for an entirely new political ideology, the Fourth Political Theory, which integrates and supersedes liberal democracy, Marxism, and fascism. In this theory, the main subject of politics is not individualism, class struggle, or nation, but rather Dasein (existence itself). According to Dugin, his aim is to take elements from all three, 'neutralise and decontaminate' negative aspects such as racism (in the case of fascism) and incorporate them into this new ideology. He refers to this ideology as a 'timeless, non-modern theory' valid for all time.

Dugin views liberalism as having 'defeated all its competitors'. He refers to the derision of the past by liberals and the modern concept of 'progress' as being seriously flawed, going so far as to describe it as racism and even 'moral genocide against the past'.

From the three other political theories, he discards the aspects he finds unacceptable and highlights what he sees as the positive qualities. He combines them to form a new political theory based on the 'ethnos', describing this as ‘the greatest value of the Fourth Political Theory as a cultural phenomenon; as a community of language, religious belief, daily life, and of sharing resources and efforts; as an organic entity’.

== Platform ==
The Eurasia Party is based around the following five principles:

1. It is a geopolitical party of the patriots of Russia and of the statists.
2. It is a social conservative party, believing that the development of the market must serve the national interest. Interests of the state are in command and administrative resources must be nationalized.
3. It is a traditionalist-communist party, founded on a system of Bolshevik values combined with traditional Eurasian confessions, namely Orthodox Christianity, Islam, Judaism and Buddhism. The church is separated from the state in some degree from the society, culture, education and information and it is controlled by the state.
4. It is a national party. In it the representatives of the national movements—first of all Russian, but also Tatar, Yakut, Tuva, Chechen, Kalmyk, Ingush and all the other ones—can find a way to express their political and cultural aspirations.
5. It is a regional party. The rectification and salvation of Russia will come from the regions, where the people have saved their communist roots, the sentiment of the past and family values.

=== Foreign policy ===
With respect to foreign policy, the Eurasia Party believes that:

- The path the West has taken is destructive. Its civilization is spiritually empty, false and monstrous. Behind economic prosperity is a total spiritual degradation.
- The exceptional character of Russia, its difference from both West and East, is a positive value. It must be saved, developed and taken care of.
- The United States exploited sorrow of the September 11 attacks in order to strengthen its positions in Central Asia. Under the cover of the war on terror, it took roots in the Russian zone of influence and in the Commonwealth of Independent States.
- From the cultural, social and political points of view, Europe is close to the United States, but its geopolitical, geostrategic and economic concerns are on the contrary close to Russia-Eurasia.

=== Domestic policy ===
With respect to Russia's domestic policies, the Eurasia Party intends to:

- Reinforce the strategic unity of Russia, her geopolitical homogeneity, the vertical line of authority, curtail the influence of the oligarchic clans, support national business and fight separatism, extremism and localism.
- Promote Eurasist federalism by conferring the status of political subjects onto the ethno-cultural formations and by enforcing the principles of the rights of the peoples.
- Promote Eurasist economics by encouraging autarchy of the great spaces, economic nationalism and subordination of the market mechanisms to the concerns of the national economy.

== See also ==
- Eurasianism, the ideology of the Eurasia Party, as developed by Dugin
- Foundations of Geopolitics, an influential 1997 book by Dugin on geopolitics
- The Fourth Political Theory, a 2009 book by Dugin on political philosophy
- National Bolshevism, the original ideology of Dugin
- Civilization state
- Radical nationalism in Russia
