= Tellurocracy =

Land-based state or society

Tellurocracy (from Latin: tellus, lit. 'land' and Greek: κράτος, romanized: krátos, lit. 'state') is a concept proposed by Aleksandr Dugin to describe a type of civilization or state system that is defined by the development of land territories and consistent penetration into inland territories. Tellurocratic states possess a set state-territory in which the state-forming ethnic majority lives, around this territory further land expansion occurs. Tellurocracy is conceived of as an antonym to thalassocracy.

Most states display an amalgam of tellurocratic and thalassocratic features. In political geography, geopolitics and geo-economics, the term is used to explain the power of a country through its control over land. For example, prior to their merger, the Sultanate of Muscat was thalassocratic, but the Imamate of Oman was landlocked and purely tellurocratic. It could be suggested that most or all landlocked states are tellurocracies.

== Defining tellurocracy ==
Tellurocracies are generally not purely tellurocratic. In particular, most large tellurocracies have coastlines and not just inland territories, unlike thalassocracies, which historically would generally only have coastlines, and not inland territories. This makes it difficult to define what exactly a tellurocracy is.

For example, the Mongols attempted to conquer Japan on multiple occasions. As well, the Russian Empire conquered Russian America (now Alaska) after it reached a point where it could no longer expand eastward by land. Likewise, the United States acquired Alaska and incorporated many islands and the Panama Canal Zone after it could no longer expand westward. It is also worth noting that the largely tellurocratic, continental Australia, founded as a group of thalassocratic colonies, now holds its own island territories outside of its mainland, such as Christmas Island.

== Historical tellurocracies ==
Many empires of antiquity are noted for being more tellurocratic than their rivals, such as the early Roman Republic in opposition to its rival Carthaginian Empire, which later as the Roman and Byzantine Empires became a rather thalassocratic, yet still quite tellurocratic rival to the quite purely tellurocratic Parthian and Sasanian Empires.

== Dugin's theory ==
In Alexandr Dugin's theory of tellurocracy, the following civilizational characteristics are traditionally attributed: a sedentary lifestyle (not excluding migratory colonization), conservatism, the permanence of legal norms, the presence of a powerful bureaucratic apparatus and central authority, strong infantry, but a weak fleet. Traditionally, tellurocracy is attributed to the Eurasian states (Qing Empire, Mongol Empire, Mughal Empire, etc.) although some, such as the early United States and the Brazilian Empire, have come into being elsewhere.

In practice, all these qualities are not always present. Moreover, certain peoples and states evolve over time in one direction or another. Russia before the Russian Empire was a typical tellurocratic state. After Emperor Peter I, there was a gradual increase in the share of thalassocratic characteristics of the Russian Empire and then the Soviet Union, which turned into one of the largest naval powers. The British Empire, on the contrary, was for a long time a small, largely thalassocratic state outside of its home islands, but during the nineteenth and twentieth centuries it increased its tellurocratic characteristics (expansion into the Australian Outback and inland Africa, etc.).

Dugin based his concept on the works of the Nazi jurist and theorist of geopolitics, Carl Schmitt. He associates tellurocracy with Eurasianism, in contrast to a perceived association of thalassocracy with Atlanticism.
