= Eurasianism =

Socio-political movement in the Russian Federation

Eurasianism (Russian: евразийство, romanized: yevrazíystvo [jɪvrɐˈzʲijstvə]) is a socio-political movement in Russia that emerged in the early 20th century under the Russian Empire, which states that Russia does not belong in the "European" or "Asian" categories but instead to the geopolitical concept of Eurasia and the "Russian world", forming an ostensibly standalone Russian civilization. The ideology is geopolitical, similar to Atlanticism and Gulfism.

The first Eurasianists were mostly émigrés and pacifists, who developed a new vision influenced by utopianism and Russian romanticism. The goal of the Eurasianists was the unification of the main Christian churches under the leadership of the Russian Orthodox Church. A key feature of Eurasianism is the rejection of Russian ethnic nationalism, which seeks to build a pan-Slavic state. The Eurasianists strongly opposed the territorial fragmentation of the Russian Empire that had occurred due to the Bolshevik Revolution and the following civil war (1917–1923). They used their geo-historical theories to insist on the necessity of the geopolitical reconstruction of the Russian state as a unified Eurasian great power. Unlike many of the White Russians, the Eurasianists rejected attempts for Tsarist restoration.

To enable their return, Eurasianist émigrés became supportive of the Bolshevik Revolution, but not its stated goals of building a communist state. Many viewed the Soviet Union as a stepping stone on the path of creating a new national identity that would reflect Russia's geopolitical situation. Eurasianist support for the Soviet Union began in the 1920s during the Stalinist era, which witnessed the emergence of a distinct socialist nationalism through CPSU's enforcement of "Socialism in one country" policy. Despite this, all organized Eurasianist activities in the Soviet Union were ended during the Great Terror of Joseph Stalin (1936–1940). After the Second World War, Stalin's efforts to empower an Eastern Bloc of communist states opposed to the Western capitalist world were seen by Eurasianist remnants as compatible with their own ideology.

Eurasianism underwent a resurgence after the collapse of the Soviet Union during the 1990s, and has been mirrored by Turanism in Turkic nations. This new Eurasianism has been described as a kind of Russian neo-imperialism. Modern Eurasianists have coalesced around three prominent ideological currents: the neo-fascist Eurasianist movement of Aleksandr Dugin; the communist Eurasianism of Gennady Zyuganov; and a state-sanctioned Eurasianism that advances Russian geopolitical interests. Eurasianism has been officially endorsed in Russia's 2023 Foreign Policy Concept approved by Vladimir Putin, which defined Russia as a "Eurasian and Euro-Pacific" civilizational-state closely aligned with China, the Muslim world, and other countries of the Global South, seeking to replace Western hegemony by a "Greater Eurasian Partnership".

== Early 20th century ==
=== Origins ===
"We do not belong to any of the great families of the human race; we are neither of the West nor of the East, and we have not the traditions of either"

— Russian philosopher Pyotr Chaadayev, 1829

The origins of Eurasianism were in the 19th century, when the Russian Empire was involved in constant wars with European powers to its west. Many philosophers, intellectuals and strategists were alienated from Europe and felt Europeanization was a threat to Russia's national identity. Russian poet Fyodor Dostoevsky famously said in 1881: "In Europe we were Tatars, but in Asia too we are Europeans." In the aftermath of events like the Crimean War and the 1878 Berlin Treaty, widely decried as a national humiliation in Russia, a new breed of monarchist elites who advocated eastward expansion, known as vostochniki (Orientalizers), emerged. Many of the vostochniki began emphasizing their "Asianness" to defend the Russian Empire from what they viewed as "intellectual colonization" from the Romano-Germanic cultures of Western Europe. Czarist vostochniki like the philosopher Konstantin Leontiev self-identified as a "Turanian" rather than Slavic, signalling a general Eurasianist cultural shift. Even Pan-Slavic intellectuals began stating their predisposition towards Asia against Europe, Islam and Buddhism above Roman Catholicism, and Turks over the Latins. However, the terminology deployed by the vostochniki had mostly remained ambiguous, with their ideas not attaining a structural ideological character, and served within the frame of Russian imperial interests. The ideas of the monarchist vostochniki would, however, become the precursor to the Eurasianist movement that emerged in the aftermath of the Bolshevik Revolution and advocated the formation of a nation-state.

=== Emergence ===
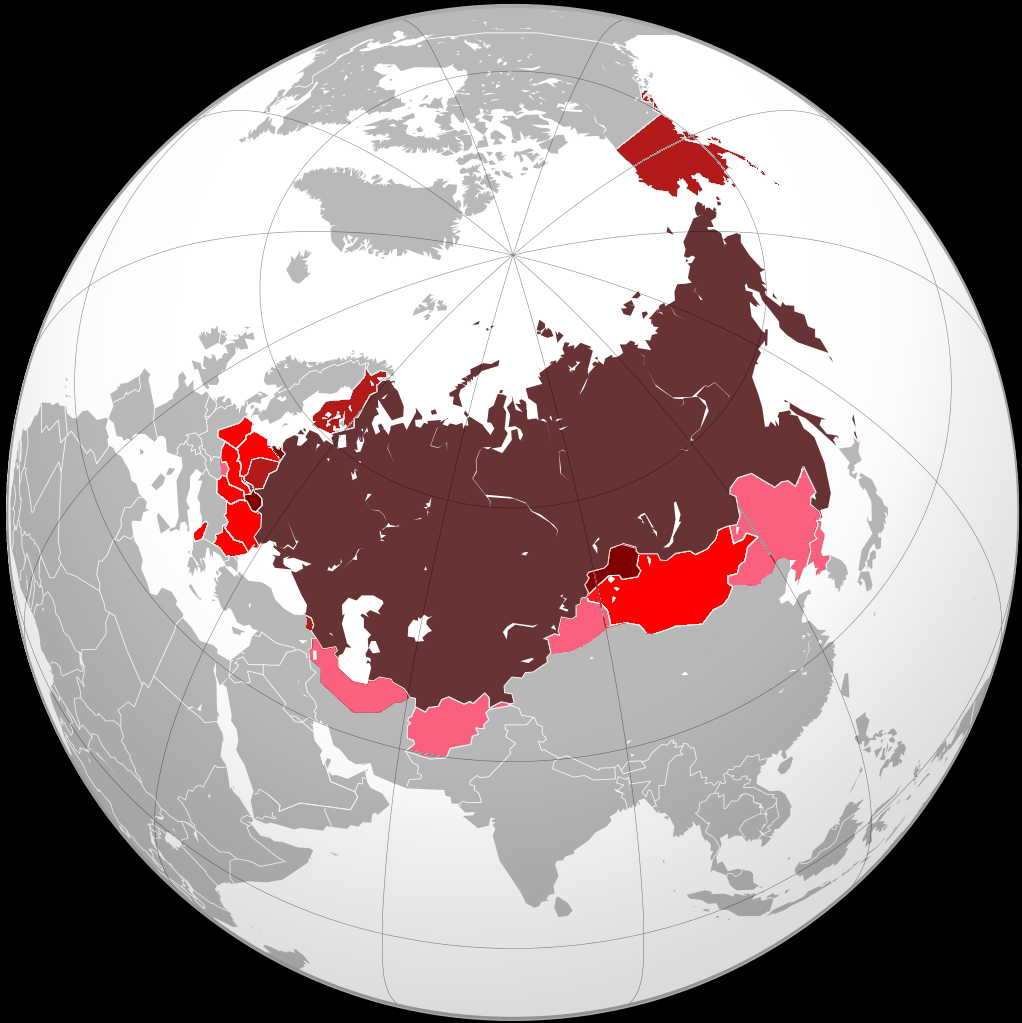
Orthographic projection of Greater Russia/Eurasia and near abroad: The Soviet Union in 1945 (Soviet territories that were never part of the Russian Empire: Tuvan ASSR, Kaliningrad Oblast and Zakarpattia, Lviv, Ivano-Frankivsk, Ternopil, and Chernivtsi regions in west Ukraine, and southern Kurils) Additional annexed/occupied territory from the Russian Empire (Grand Duchy of Finland, Congress Poland, and Alaska) Maximum extent of the Soviet near abroad, 1955 (Warsaw Pact, Mongolian People's Republic and North Korea) Maximum extent of the Russian Empire's sphere of influence after the sale of Alaska in 1867, despite later Soviet attempts to restore them (Northern Iran, Xinjiang, Manchuria, Afghanistan)

Eurasianism is a political movement with origins in the Russian émigré community in the 1920s who had fled Russia in the aftermath of the Bolshevik revolution, the Russian civil war and witnessed the socio-political turbulence of the Interwar period. The movement posited that Russian civilization does not belong in the "European" or "Asian" categories and constituted a separate "third continent within the Old World". As anti-monarchists and proponents of an authoritarian republic, Eurasianists praised many aspects of the October Revolution, and they portrayed the Bolshevik movement as a necessary reaction to the rapid modernization of Russian society. Eurasianism was based on a combination of Third-Worldism, resistance to Westernization, championing what it viewed as the "cultural superiority" of the East over the Western World and defined Eurasia in geographical terms, shared by peoples of Russian-Turkic heritage.

Stalin's "Socialism in one country" policy served as a vindication of Soviet Union in the eyes of many Eurasian activists. These Eurasianists criticized the anti-Bolshevik activities of organizations such as ROVS, believing that the émigré community's energies would be better focused on preparing for this hoped for process of evolution. In turn, their opponents among the emigres argued that the Eurasianists were calling for a compromise with and even support of the Soviet regime, while justifying its ruthless policies (such as the persecution of the Russian Orthodox Church and demolition of churches) as mere "transitory problems" that were inevitable results of the revolutionary process. A communist Eurasianist faction led by Pyotr Suvchinsky gained traction during the 1920s, which began denouncing the anti-Soviet critics as "bourgeois".

The key leaders of the Eurasianists were Prince Nikolai Trubetzkoy, Pyotr Savitsky, Pyotr Suvchinsky, D.S. Mirsky, Konstantin Chkheidze, Pyotr Arapov, Lev Karsavin, and Sergei Efron. Philosopher Georges Florovsky was initially a supporter, but backed out of the organization claiming it "raises the right questions", but "poses the wrong answers". Nikolai Berdyaev wrote that he may have influenced the Eurasianists' acceptance of the Bolshevik Revolution as a fact, but he noted that a number of key Eurasianist tenets were completely alien and hostile to him: they did not love freedom as he did, they were statists, they were hostile to Western culture in a way Berdyaev was not, and they accepted Orthodoxy in a perfunctory manner.

In October 1925 a congress was held in Prague with the intention of creating a seminar. One of the participants was Vladimir Nikolaevich Ilyin (1890-1974), a philosopher, theologian and composer from Kyiv and not related to Ivan A. Ilyin who has been presented in the literature by various authors as belonging to the group.

Several members of the Eurasianists were affected by the Soviet provocational TREST operation, which had set up a fake meeting of Eurasianists in Russia that was attended by the Eurasianist leader P.N. Savitsky in 1926 (Eurasianist member P. Arapov made a series of trips two years earlier). The uncovering of the TREST as a Soviet provocation caused a serious morale blow to the Eurasianists and discredited their public image.

In the late 1920s, Eurasianists polarized and became divided in to two groups: the left Eurasianists, who were becoming increasingly pro-Soviet and pro-communist and the classic right Eurasianists, who remained staunchly anti-communist and anti-Soviet. After the emergence of "left Eurasianism" in Paris, where some of the movement's leaders became pro-Soviet, Trubetzkoy who was a staunch anti-communist heavily criticised them and eventually broke with the Eurasianist movement. The Eurasianists faded quickly from the Russian émigré community. By 1929, the Eurasianists had ceased publishing their periodical. Several organizations similar in spirit to the Eurasianists sprung up in the émigré community at around the same time, such as the pro-Monarchist Mladorossi and the Smenovekhovtsi.

During the mid-1930s, representatives of the Eurasianist movement who had settled in the Soviet Union were suppressed during the Stalinist purges and Eurasianist émigrés had mostly scattered throughout Europe. By 1938, all organized Eurasianist movement had ceased to exist.

Early proponents of Eurasianist themes in the West argued that control of the Eurasian heartland was the key to geopolitical dominance. It influenced Oswald Spengler, as well as various far-right extremists. These included the American white nationalist and neo-Nazi Francis Parker Yockey, the Belgian Nazi collaborator Jean-François Thiriart and interwar German National Bolsheviks.

== Greater Russia ==
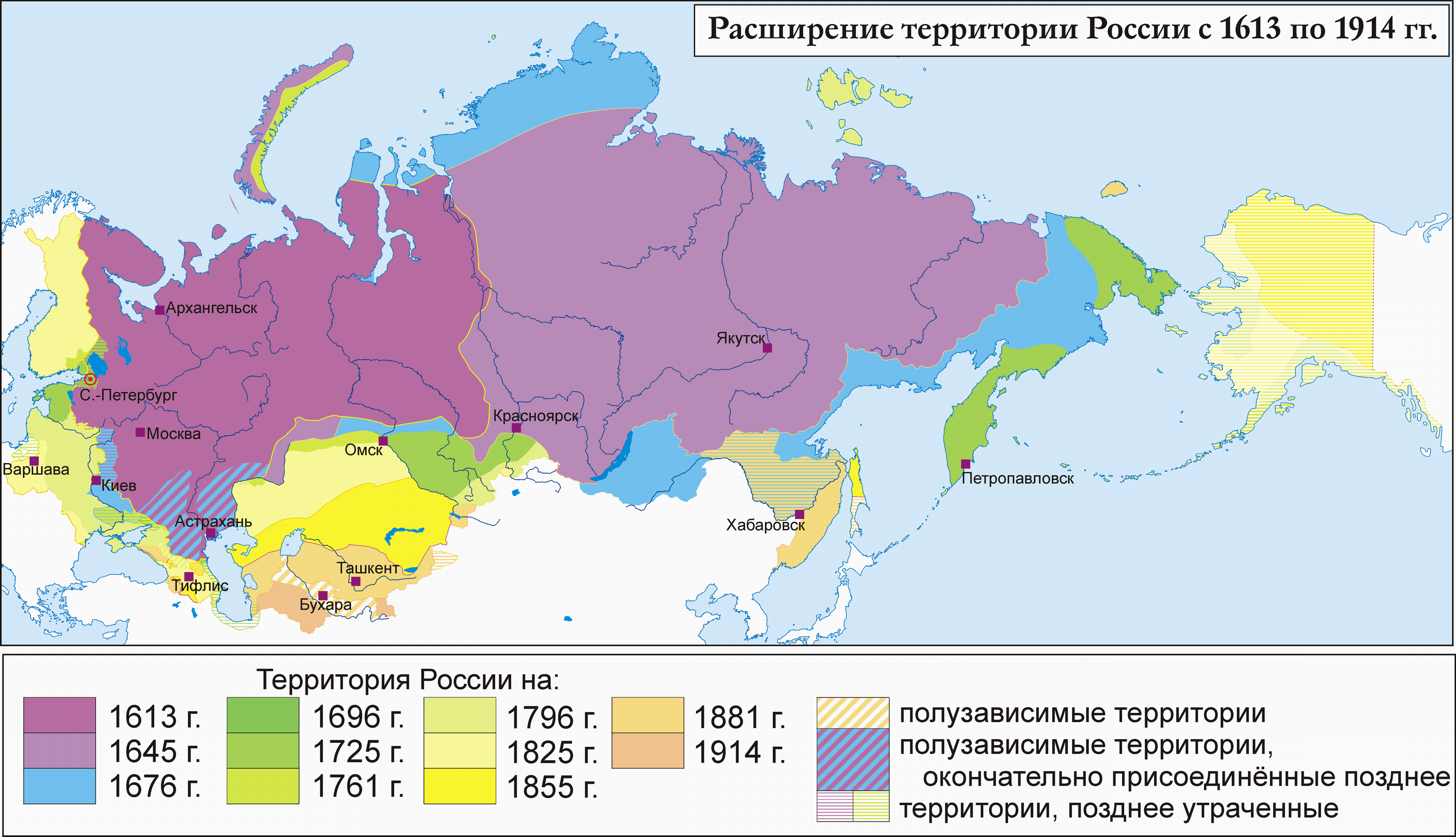
Russian growth (1613–1914)

The political-cultural concept espoused by some in Russia is sometimes called the "Greater Russia" and is described as a political aspiration of pan-Russian nationalists and irredentists to retake the territories of the other republics of the former Soviet Union, territory of the former Russian Empire, the Democratic Republic of Afghanistan, and amalgamate them into a single Russian state. Alexander Rutskoy, the vice president of Russia from 1991 to 1993, asserted irredentist claims to Narva in Estonia, Crimea in Ukraine, and Ust-Kamenogorsk in Kazakhstan, among other territories.

== Eurasianism as ideology ==
Drawing on historical, geographical, ethnographical, linguistic, cultural and religious studies, the Eurasianists suggested that the lands of the Russian Empire, and then of the Soviet Union, formed a natural unity. The first Eurasianists were mostly Émigrés, pacifists, and their vision of the future had features of romanticism and utopianism. The goal of the Eurasianists was the unification of the main Christian churches under the leadership of the Russian Orthodox Church. According to French historian Marlene Laurelle, despite admiring aspects of European fascist movements, early Eurasianist intellectuals were repelled by their glorification of violence, militarism, extremism, racism, etc.

A key feature of Eurasianism is the rejection of Russian ethnic nationalism; which seeks a pan-Slavic state. The Eurasianists strongly opposed the territorial fragmentation of the Russian Imperial state that had followed in the wake of the revolution and civil war, and they used their geo-historical theories to insist on the necessity of the geopolitical reconstruction of the Russian state as a unified Eurasian great power. Unlike many of the white Russians, the Eurasianists rejected all hope for a restoration of the monarchy. Aversion to democracy is an important characteristic of Eurasianism. Eurasianists considered ideocracy a good thing, provided that the ruling ideas were the right ones.

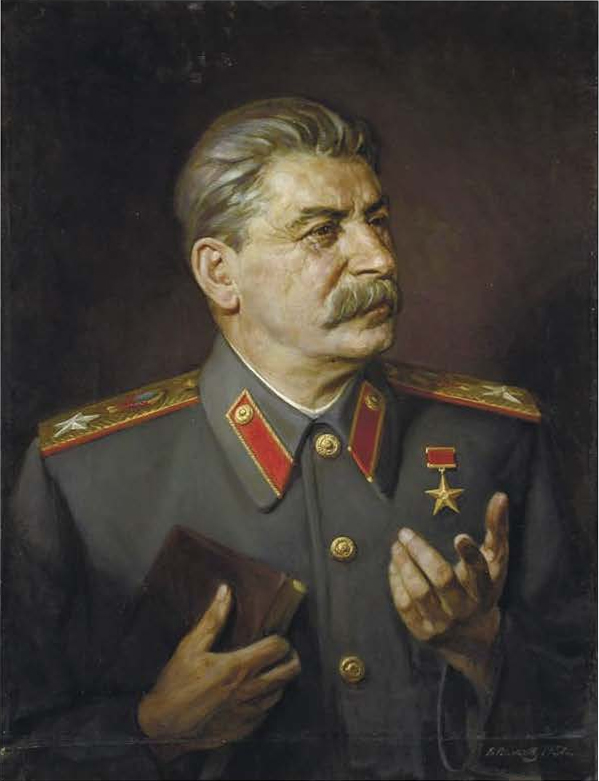
Appropriation of Joseph Stalin and neo-Stalinism are key features in Eurasianism. Neo-Eurasianist ideologue Aleksandr Dugin described Stalin as the "greatest personality in Russian history" who represented "the spirit of Soviet society and the Soviet people".

Former Warsaw Pact countries

For David Lewis, there are a number of people who assert "an alternative topography, articulated in a series of spatial projects – the 'Russian World', 'Eurasian integration', 'Greater Eurasia' – which aims to carve out a space in opposition to the 'spacelessness' of Western-dominated global order. Influential Russian foreign policy thinkers have viewed the emerging twenty-first-century international order as being constituted not by institutions of global governance, but by a few major political-economic regions, dominated by major powers, a return to the sphere-of-influence politics of the past. It is Russia's goal [have said these thinkers] to assert its own central role as a great power, in just such a 'Great Space', that of Eurasia.

The head of the Russian Foreign Ministry's school for future diplomats, Igor Panarin, is (as of 2008) a vocal Eurasianist, as is the head of the Faculty of World Economy and International Affairs at the Moscow Higher School of Economics, Sergey Karaganov. Academics such as Natalya Narochnitskaya, Yegor Kholmogorov, and Vadim Tsymburskii all espouse a messianic version of Eurasianism, and twin it with some form of Eastern Orthodox Church theology.

Romanian-French writer Jean Parvulesco († 2010) argued for a "great Eurasian pan-European empire" uniting "Western Europe and Eastern Europe, Russia and Greater Siberia, India and Japan", against the United Kingdom and the United States. He was one of the proponents of a Paris-Berlin-Moscow Axis to counter "Anglo-Saxon hegemony" since at least the 1960s.

The Eurasia Movement is a National Bolshevik Russian political movement founded in 2001 by the writer Eduard Limonov and political philosopher Aleksandr Dugin. The organization follows the neo-Eurasian ideology, which adopts an eclectic mixture of Russian patriotism, Orthodox faith, anti-modernism, and even some Bolshevik ideas. The organization opposes "American" values such as liberalism, capitalism, and modernism.

Alexander Dugin, who initially followed the ideology of National Bolshevism, brought into Eurasianism the idea of a "third position" (a combination of capitalism and socialism), geopolitics (Eurasianism as a tellurocracy, opposing the Atlantic thalassocracy of the United States and NATO) and Stalinist Russian conservatism (the USSR as a major Eurasian power). In Dugin's works, Eurasian concepts and provisions are intertwined with the concepts of European New Right. Researchers note that in the formulation of philosophical problems and political projects, he significantly deviates from classical Eurasianism, which is presented in his numerous works very selectively, eclectically. In the neo-Eurasianism of Dugin's version, the Russian ethnos is considered "the most priority Eurasian ethnos", which must fulfill the civilizational mission of forming a Eurasian empire that will occupy the entire continent. The main threat is declared by the United States and the Anglosphere in general under a "neo-liberal" ideology he calls "Atlanticism". The most preferred form of government is a Russian fascist dictatorship and a totalitarian state with complete ideological control over society. In the 1990s, Dugin criticized Italian fascism and German Nazism as "not fascist enough", and accused PR of China of anti-Russian subversion. In subsequent years he abandoned direct apology for fascism and prefers to speak from the positions of the conservative revolution and National Bolshevism, which, however, researchers also refer to varieties of fascism called the Fourth Political Theory. Thus, Marlene Laurelle has portrayed Dugin's neo-Eurasianism as being very similar to the militant mentality of inter-war fascist movements in Europe. In 21st century, Dugin has become a semi-official philosopher of the Putin regime and his ideas has become an integral part of Putinism. In 2023, he headed the establishment of the Ivan Ilyin Higher School of Politics at the Russian State University for the Humanities.

Nikolai Trubetzkoy, a leading theorist of Eurasianism, considered the predecessor of the Russian state to be the Mongol Empire founded by Genghis Khan rather than the principalities of Kievan Rus'. He argued that Genghis Khan was the first to unite the entire Eurasian continent, and that "by its very nature, Eurasia is historically predestined to comprise a single state entity."

In a separate context, Vladimir Putin referred to the Mongol–Tatar yoke in a speech in November 2023. He contrasted Mongol rule with Western domination, stating: "Alexander Nevsky received a jarlyk [permission] from the khans of the Golden Horde to rule as a prince, primarily so that he could effectively resist the invasion of the West." According to Putin, this decision to submit to the Tatar khans following the Mongol invasion of Kievan Rus' preserved "the Russian people – and later all the peoples living on the territory of our country." Commentators have noted that while Trubetzkoy's views were rooted in Eurasianist ideology, Putin's remarks reflected his emphasis on Russian historical continuity and Slavic identity.

=== Criticism ===
Modern Eurasianism has been criticized as a Russian neo-imperialist and expansionist ideology rooted in Tsarist notions of "Russian exceptionalism" that attempts to maintain Russian ethnic hegemony over non-Russian minorities living in modern Russia's spheres of influence, through the creation of a new national mythos. The anti-Western orientation of Eurasianism has been weaponized in Putinist Russia to shut down any dissent from the official Kremlin line. Political scientist Anton Shekhovtsov defined Dugin's version of Neo-Eurasianism as "a form of a fascist ideology centred on the idea of revolutionising the Russian society and building a totalitarian, Russia-dominated Eurasian Empire that would challenge and eventually defeat its eternal adversary represented by the United States and its Atlanticist allies, thus bringing about a new 'golden age' of global political and cultural illiberalism".

In 2022, after Putin had begun the full-scale Russo-Ukrainian war, Australian russologist Paul Dibb has identified Putin, supported by Panarin, Karaganov and Dugin, as having "begun to stress the geopolitics of what they call 'Eurasianism', which is an intellectual movement promoting an ideology of Russian–Asian greatness." In this context, a westernized Ukraine would be in the words of Karaganov "a spearhead aimed at the heart of Russia". Eurasianism would seem negatively to impact the Baltic countries, as well as Poland.

Igor Torbakov argued in June 2022 that "According to the Kremlin's geopolitical outlook, Russia could only successfully compete with the United States, China or the European Union if it acts as a leader of the regional bloc. Bringing Russia and its ex-Soviet neighbours into a closely integrated community of states, Russian strategists contend, would allow this Eurasian association to become one of the major centres of global and regional governance."

According to Clover, Eurasianism appeared to be well-known in early 21st-century Russia. In 2019, one commentator noted that it then was "one of the best known and most frequently mentioned political movements of the period."

== Eurasianist geo-politics ==
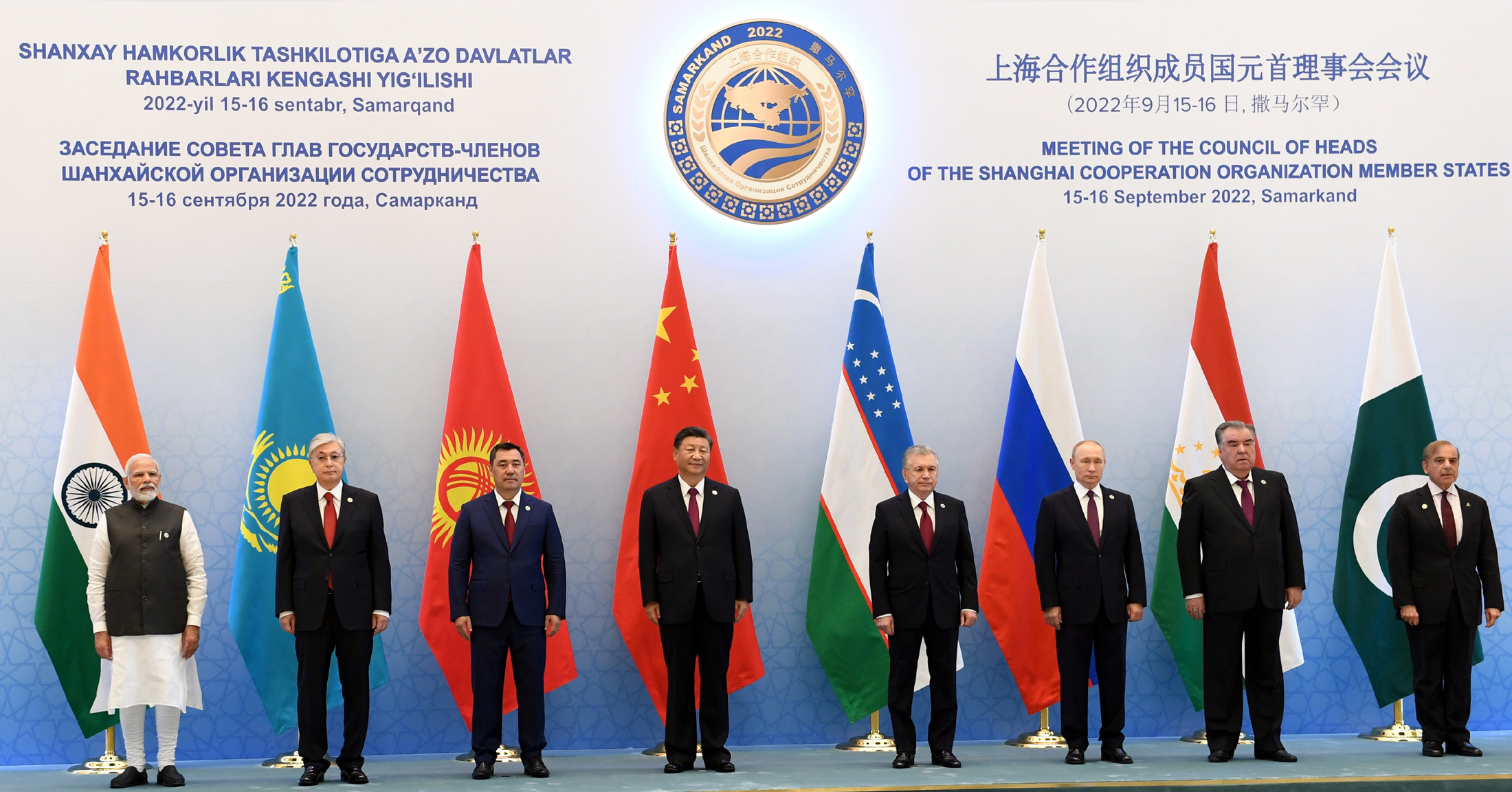
Putin with Chinese leader Xi Jinping, Indian Prime Minister Narendra Modi and other leaders at the Shanghai Cooperation Organisation summit on 16 September 2022

Ideologically, President of Kazakhstan Nursultan Nazarbayev's speech in March 1994 at Moscow State University became the starting point for the implementation of a pragmatic Eurasianism. He proposed an integration paradigm that was fundamentally new at the time: to move towards a Eurasian Union based on economic integration and common defense. This vision has been later materialized in the Eurasian Economic Union and the Collective Security Treaty Organization. Eurasianism in Nazarbayev's reading has been seen as a system of foreign policy, economic ideas and priorities (as opposed to a philosophy). This type of Eurasianism is unequivocally open to the outside world.

=== Eurasian Economic Union ===
The Eurasian Economic Union

The Eurasian Economic Union was founded in January 2015, consisting of Armenia, Belarus, Kazakhstan, Kyrgyzstan, Russia and observer members Moldova, Uzbekistan and Cuba, all of them (except Cuba) being previous members of the Soviet Union. Members include states from both Europe and Asia; the union promotes political and economic cooperation among members.

=== Collective Security Treaty Organization ===
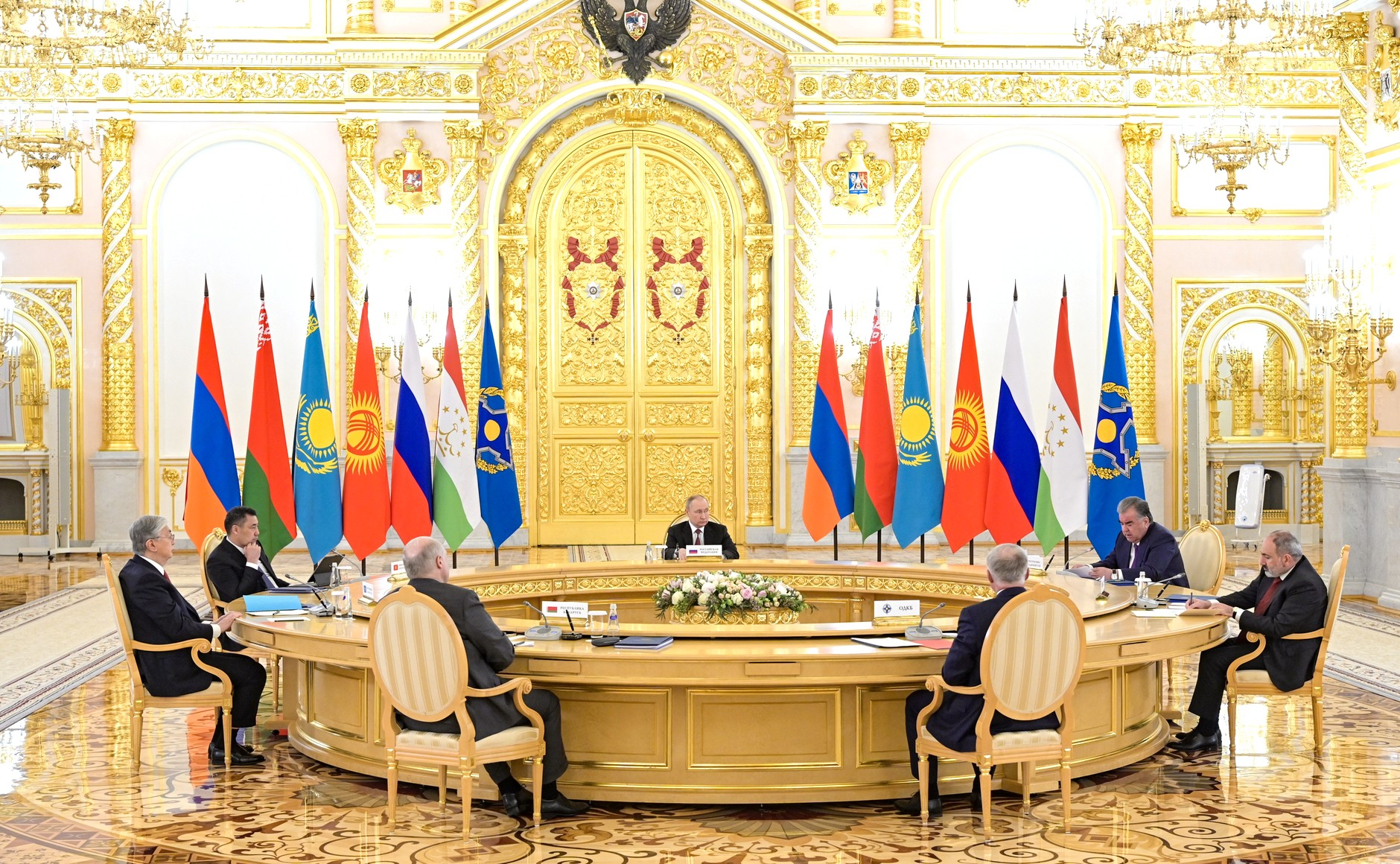
Putin hosting a meeting of the Collective Security Treaty Organization (CSTO) in Moscow on 16 May 2022

The 'Collective Security Treaty Organization' is an intergovernmental military alliance that was signed on 15 May 1992. In 1992, six post-Soviet states belonging to the Commonwealth of Independent States – Russia, Armenia, Kazakhstan, Kyrgyzstan, Tajikistan, and Uzbekistan – signed the Collective Security Treaty (also referred to as the "Tashkent Pact" or "Tashkent Treaty"). Three other post-Soviet states – Azerbaijan, Belarus, and Georgia – signed the next year and the treaty took effect in 1994. Five years later, six of the nine – all but Azerbaijan, Georgia, and Uzbekistan – agreed to renew the treaty for five more years, and in 2002 those six agreed to create the 'Collective Security Treaty Organization' as a military alliance. Uzbekistan rejoined the CSTO in 2006 but withdrew in 2012.

=== Eurasianist foreign policy doctrine of Russia ===
Eurasianist sentiments have been on the rise across Russian society since the ascent of Putin in Russia. In a poll conducted by Levada Center in 2021, 64% of Russian citizens identified Russia as a non-European country; while only 29% regarded Russia to be part of Europe.

Dmitry Medvedev, deputy chairman of the Security Council of Russia and former Russian President, in 2022, has declared on his Telegram channel the state goal "to finally build Eurasia from Lisbon to Vladivostok."

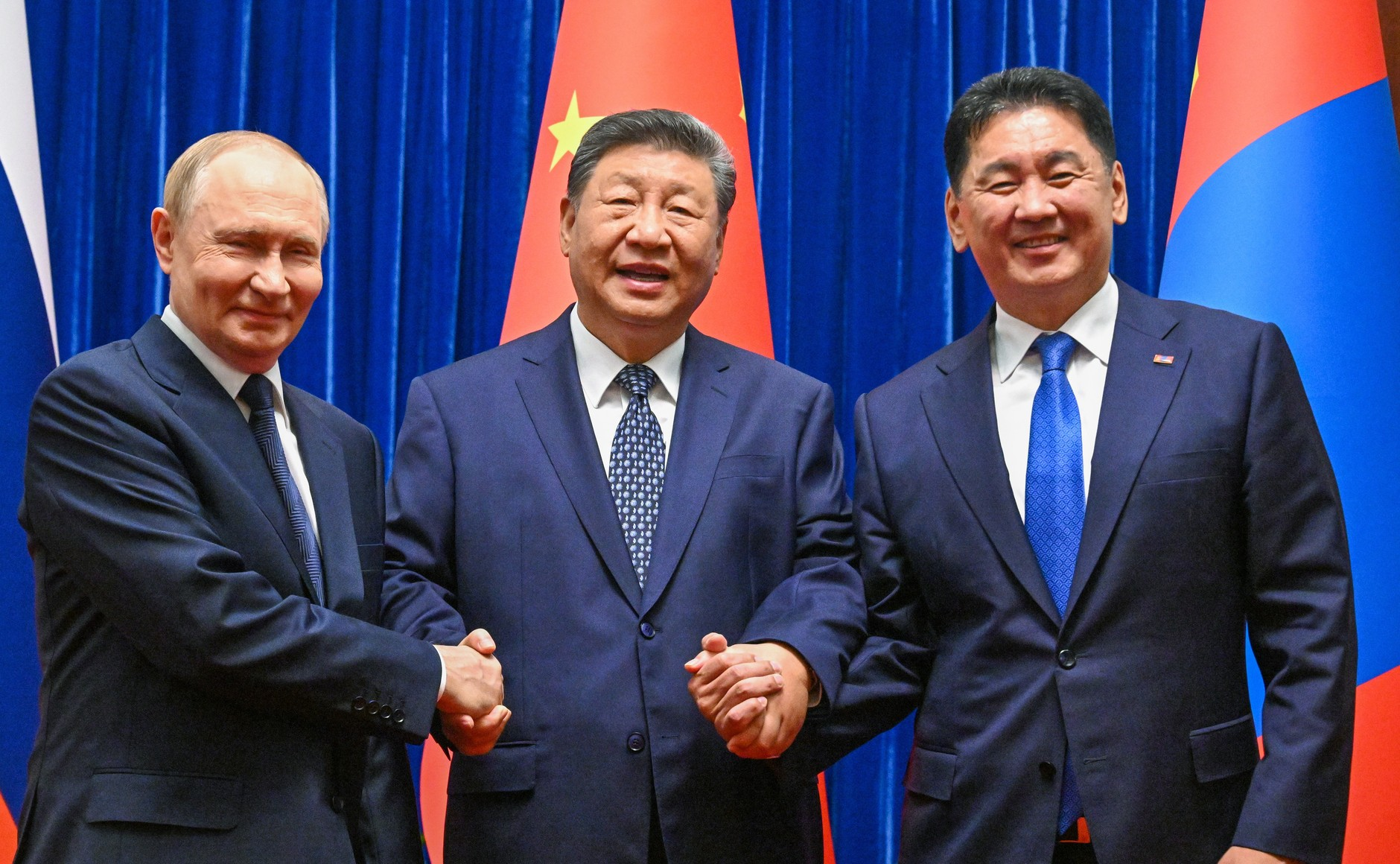
Putin with Xi Jinping and Mongolian President Ukhnaagiin Khürelsükh in Beijing, China, on 2 September 2025

In 2023, Russia adopted a Eurasianist, anti-Western foreign policy strategy in a document titled "The Concept of the Foreign Policy of the Russian Federation" approved by Vladimir Putin. The document defined Russia as a "unique country-civilization and a vast Eurasian and Euro-Pacific power" that seeks to create a "Greater Eurasian Partnership" by pursuing close relations with China, India, countries of the Islamic World and rest of the Global South (Latin America and sub-Saharan Africa). The policy identifies United States and other Anglosphere as "the main inspirer, organizer and executor of the aggressive anti-Russian policy of the collective West" and seeks the end of geopolitical American dominance in the international scene. The document also adopts a neo-Soviet posture, positioning Russia as the successor state of USSR and calls for spreading "accurate information" about the "decisive contribution of the Soviet Union" in shaping the post-WWII international order and the United Nations.

Russia's close ties with China in the post-Cold War period can be likened to a form of neo-Eurasian ideology, which has "manifested in three major points: a shared approach to civilisation, attempts to reorient the dynamics of international politics in their own neighbourhood and calling for the development of a multipolar international system in which the US is not the hegemonic power and [Russia] can count itself among the major decision-makers."

== In popular culture ==
Robert Heinlein's story "Solution Unsatisfactory" (published in 1941) depicted a future in which the Soviet Union would be transformed into "The Eurasian Union".

In 1949, George Orwell's novel Nineteen Eighty Four was published. In the future time depicted there, the Soviet Union has mutated into Eurasia, one of the three superstates dominating the world.

== See also ==
- All-Russian nation
- Eurasian Economic Union
- Eurasian Observatory for Democracy and Elections
- Eurasia Party
- Eurasian Youth Union
- Intermediate Region
- Manifest destiny
- Proletarian internationalism
- Great Game
- Atlanticism
- Conservatism in Russia
- Neo-Sovietism
- Nostalgia for the Soviet Union
- Rashism
- Russian irredentism
- Russian nationalism
- Great Russian chauvinism
- Pan-nationalism
- Pan-Slavism
- Post-Soviet states
- Territorial evolution of Russia
- Tsarist autocracy
- Oriental despotism
- Belt and Road Initiative
- Lev Gumilyov
- Hungarian Turanism
- Pan-Turanism
- Anti-Americanism
- The Foundations of Geopolitics
- Dimitri Kitsikis
- Eurasian Humanities Studies

== Sources ==
- The Mission of Russian Emigration, M.V. Nazarov. Moscow: Rodnik, 1994. ISBN 5-86231-172-6
- Russia Abroad: A comprehensive guide to Russian Emigration after 1917 also some Ustrialov's papers in the Library
- The criticism towards the West and the future of Russia-Eurasia
- Laruelle, Marlene, ed. (2015). Eurasianism and the European Far Right: Reshaping the Europe–Russia Relationship. Lexington Books. ISBN 978-1-4985-1068-4.
- Stefan Wiederkehr (de), Die eurasische Bewegung. Wissenschaft und Politik in der russischen Emigration der Zwischenkriegszeit und im postsowjetischen Russland (Böhlau Verlag 2007) (Beiträge zur Geschichte Osteuropas, 39).
