= Russian civilization =

Purported civilization

The Russian civilization (Русская цивилизация) is a purported civilization formed by Russians governed by the claimed "Russian world" (Russian: Русский мир), used as a concept in Russian nationalism and Russian irredentism.

== Definitions ==
The concept takes on a different meaning depending on the author:

- according to Philip Bagby, it is one of the peripheral civilizations.
- others, such as professor Vladimir Nikolayevich Leksin, consider it a myth.
- According to Samuel Huntington, there is no such thing as a Russian civilization. In his view, Russian culture is a part of an Eastern Orthodox civilization.
- Toynbee regarded the Russian civilization as having modest cultural achievements, but as something complete, Danilevsky and Spengler described it more as a phenomenon of the future, the latter believed that government reform of Peter the Great did not meet the traditions of a Russian civilization.
- Plekhanov and Berdyaev believed that a Russian civilization occupies a border position between East and West. Solovyov believed that the mission of a Russian civilization in the unification of East and West, and the Eurasianists consider it as some third force.
- Some consider communism alien to traditional Russian values, others believe that the USSR was a natural continuation of a traditional Russian civilization. Orthodoxy, Autocracy, and Nationality is similar to communist partijnost' (party-mindedness, partisanship), idejnost' (ideology-mindedness) and populism.
- Researcher Rumyana Cholakova (Washington University in St. Louis) considers Russian civilization to be amalgamation of Slavic culture, Tatar culture, Finno-Ugric culture, Viking culture and the Great Steppe culture of its inhabitants. According to her, the concept of Russian soul is central to Russian civilization.

== See also ==
- Russian world
- All-Russian nation
- Civilizing mission
- Culture of Russia
- Culture of the Soviet Union
- Russian soul
- Russification
- Russian imperialism
