= Greater Eurasian Partnership =

Russian foreign relations initiative

The Greater Eurasian Partnership is an initiative of Russian President Vladimir Putin, put forward in his address to the Federal Assembly in 2015 with the aim of forming a broad integration framework on the Eurasian continent, as indicated by the Russian Foreign Ministry.

The core of the Greater Eurasian Partnership could be made up of the EAEU, SCO, ASEAN, and the BRI infrastructure initiative. The Greater Eurasian Partnership could include a network of international trade and investment agreements, a common transport space, a unified network of economic corridors and zones of development, a digital dimension, an energy area and a financial dimension.

On 6 September 2024, Deputy Minister of Foreign Affairs of the Russian Federation Alexander Pankin said: "It is important to understand that the Greater Eurasian Partnership is not an international organization."

== Agreements and decisions ==
In 2005, a Memorandum of Understanding was signed between the SCO and ASEAN secretariats.

The possibility of establishing mutually beneficial cooperation between the EAEU, ASEAN and the SCO was supported by the states at the Russia-ASEAN summit in May 2016.

During the Russia-ASEAN summit in Singapore on 14 November 2018, a Memorandum of Understanding was signed between the Eurasian Economic Commission and ASEAN.

During the SCO Council of Heads of State meeting on 10 November 2020, a decision was made to sign a Memorandum of Understanding between the SCO Secretariat and the Eurasian Economic Commission. The Memorandum was signed at the SCO Council of Heads of State meeting in Dushanbe on 16-17 September 2021.

As indicated by the Russian Foreign Ministry, the "backbone" of the Greater Eurasian Partnership is intended to be the conjugation of the EAEU and BRI development plans, initiated by the adoption of the Joint Russian-Chinese Statement of 8 May 2015. As part of the implementation of this agreement, a non-preferential Agreement on Trade and Economic Cooperation between the EAEU and its member states, on the one hand, and the People's Republic of China, on the other, was signed in May 2018 and entered into force on 25 October 2019.

The EAEU is assigned the role of one of the centres of the Greater Eurasian Partnership. A special focus will be given to the conclusion of multilateral and bilateral free trade agreements by the EAEU. The Strategic Directions for the Development of Eurasian Economic Integration until 2025, approved at the meeting of the Supreme Eurasian Economic Council on 11 December 2020, include the task of forming a Greater Eurasian Partnership, but also mention the CIS, BRI, ASEAN, the European Union and the Organisation for Economic Co-operation and Development.

On 4 July 2024, Astana hosted a meeting of the Council of Heads of Member States of the Shanghai Cooperation Organisation, where the Astana Declaration was adopted. In it, the SCO member states supported Russia's proposal to create a Greater Eurasian Partnership involving the SCO countries, the Eurasian Economic Union, the Association of Southeast Asian Nations, as well as other interested states and multilateral associations.

== Proposals and related initiatives ==
At the Astana Economic Forum on 22 May 2015, President of Kazakhstan Nursultan Nazarbayev expressed confidence in the mutual benefits of the free trade agreement between the Eurasian Economic Union and the European Union. He proposed the creation of a United Eurasian Economic Area with common rules that would remove barriers among countries while taking into account their national interests.

On 1 April 2016, at the Carnegie Endowment headquarters in Washington, Nazarbayev said, "It is very important to steer regional processes in a constructive direction, reducing the potential for conflict in the region by deepening cooperation and integration. That is why I proposed the creation of a United Eurasian Economic Area."

In 2018, a scientific article referred to the SCO and the EAEU as the foundation for a future Greater Eurasian Partnership.

In 2018, a scientific article provided an opportunity to assess the potential involvement of the European Union after the joint communiqué of the European Commission and the High Representative of the European Union for Foreign Affairs and Security Policy "Connecting Europe and Asia. Building a Strategy for the European Union" (19 September 2018), but the EU document was not a response to the Russian initiative, but an independent document.

In 2019, Nursultan Nazarbayev proposed a new vision for the further development of integration processes in Eurasia. "We need to establish full-fledged economic cooperation between the Eurasian Economic Union, the European Union, the Shanghai Cooperation Organisation and ASEAN".

On 23 October 2020, Alexander Shokhin, President of the Russian Union of Industrialists and Entrepreneurs (RSPP), stated that the Shanghai Cooperation Organisation (SCO) could become a key element in the integration processes in Greater Eurasia.

In 2020, a scientific article considers the Shanghai Cooperation Organisation as a fundamental element in the structure of Greater Eurasia.

According to Andrei Kortunov's 2020 article, "The Partnership does not represent an alliance of the Eurasian East against the European West. Europe is eventually a large peninsula in the north-west of the Eurasian continent, and it should not oppose Eurasia, but become an integral part of it. Therefore, the Partnership remains open to the European Union, which can join the Partnership's work in whatever forms and to whatever extent it deems appropriate."

In 2021, Russian Foreign Minister Sergey Lavrov said in an interview with the Pakistani newspaper The News International that participation in the Greater Eurasian Partnership was open to the European Union if Brussels showed interest. Putin also expressed the opinion that European Union participation would be "truly harmonious, balanced and comprehensive". Kazakhstan's President Tokayev stated that Kazakhstan remains positive about the process of creating the Greater Eurasian Partnership: "I believe that the Commonwealth of Independent States could be the most suitable base for implementing a mega-project such as the Greater Eurasian Partnership".

In 2023, Ravshan Nazarov, Senior Research Fellow at the Institute of State and Law of the Academy of Sciences of the Republic of Uzbekistan, noted that "when the term Greater Eurasia was first discussed, it referred to Eurasia from Lisbon to Vladivostok. Another thing is that most of Eurasia consists of the countries of the Shanghai Cooperation Organisation. Therefore, we can say that the SCO is an institutional tool around which integration projects are being united."

On 19 June 2023, Lavrov stated that the Greater Eurasian Partnership had become Russia's flagship project.

In 2024, Russian Deputy Foreign Minister Alexander Pankin stated that no European partners would be excluded. "When conditions are created, of course, Greater Eurasia and the Greater Eurasian Partnership could include what was previously called the space from Lisbon to Vladivostok."

=== Continental union and security ===
In Perm on 29 May 2025, Lavrov stated at the Eurasian International Socio-Political Hearings on the Formation of an Architecture of an Equal and Indivisible System of Security and Cooperation in the Eurasian Space in 2025 that "the Greater Eurasian Partnership is not limited to economics, trade, transport and logistics alone. It is the material basis for another Russian initiative - the initiative to form a Eurasian security architecture, which Putin put forward in his speech at the Russian Foreign Ministry on 14 June 2024. ... In Africa, there is a pan-continental organization, the African Union, in Latin America - CELAC, but in Eurasia there is no such pan-continental association yet."
