= Atlanticism =

Ideology of European and North American friendship

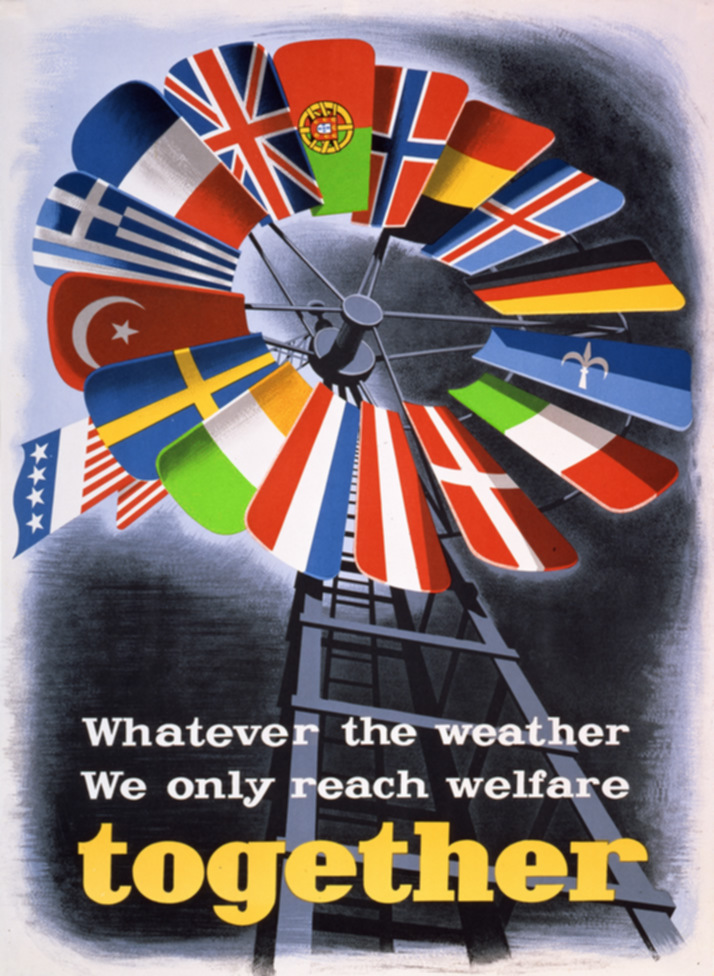
US government poster promoting the Marshall Plan (1950)

Atlanticism, also known as North Atlanticism or Transatlanticism, is the ideology that advocates a close alliance between nations in Northern America (the United States and Canada) and in Europe on political, economic, and defense issues. The term derives from the North Atlantic Ocean, which is bordered by North America and Europe. It is a geopolitical ideology in the same regard as Eurasianism or Gulfism.

The term can be used in a more specific way to refer to support for North Atlantic military alliances against the Soviet Union, or in a more expansive way to imply broader cooperation, perceived deeply shared values, a merging of diplomatic cultures, as well as a sense of community and some degree of integration between North America and Europe. In practice, the philosophy of Atlanticism encourages active North American, particularly American, engagement in Europe and close cooperation between states on both sides of the ocean. Atlanticism manifested itself most strongly during World War II and in its aftermath, the Cold War, through the establishment of various Euro-Atlantic institutions, most importantly the North Atlantic Treaty Organization (NATO) and the Marshall Plan, with the purpose being to maintain or increase the security and prosperity of the participating countries during the Cold War and protect liberal democracy.

Atlanticism varies in strength from region to region and from country to country based on a variety of historical and cultural factors. It is often considered to be particularly strong in Eastern Europe, Central Europe, Ireland, and the United Kingdom (linked to the Special Relationship). Politically, it has tended to be associated most heavily and enthusiastically but not exclusively with classical liberals or the political right in Europe. Atlanticism often implies an affinity for the social or political culture of the United States, or affinity for Europe in North America, as well as the historical bonds between the two continents.

There is some tension between Atlanticism and continentalism on both sides of the Atlantic, with some people emphasising increased regional cooperation or integration over trans-Atlantic cooperation. The relationship between Atlanticism and North American or European integrations is complex, and they are not seen in direct opposition to one another by many commentators. Internationalism is the foreign policy belief combining both Atlanticism and continentalism.

== History ==
=== Background ===
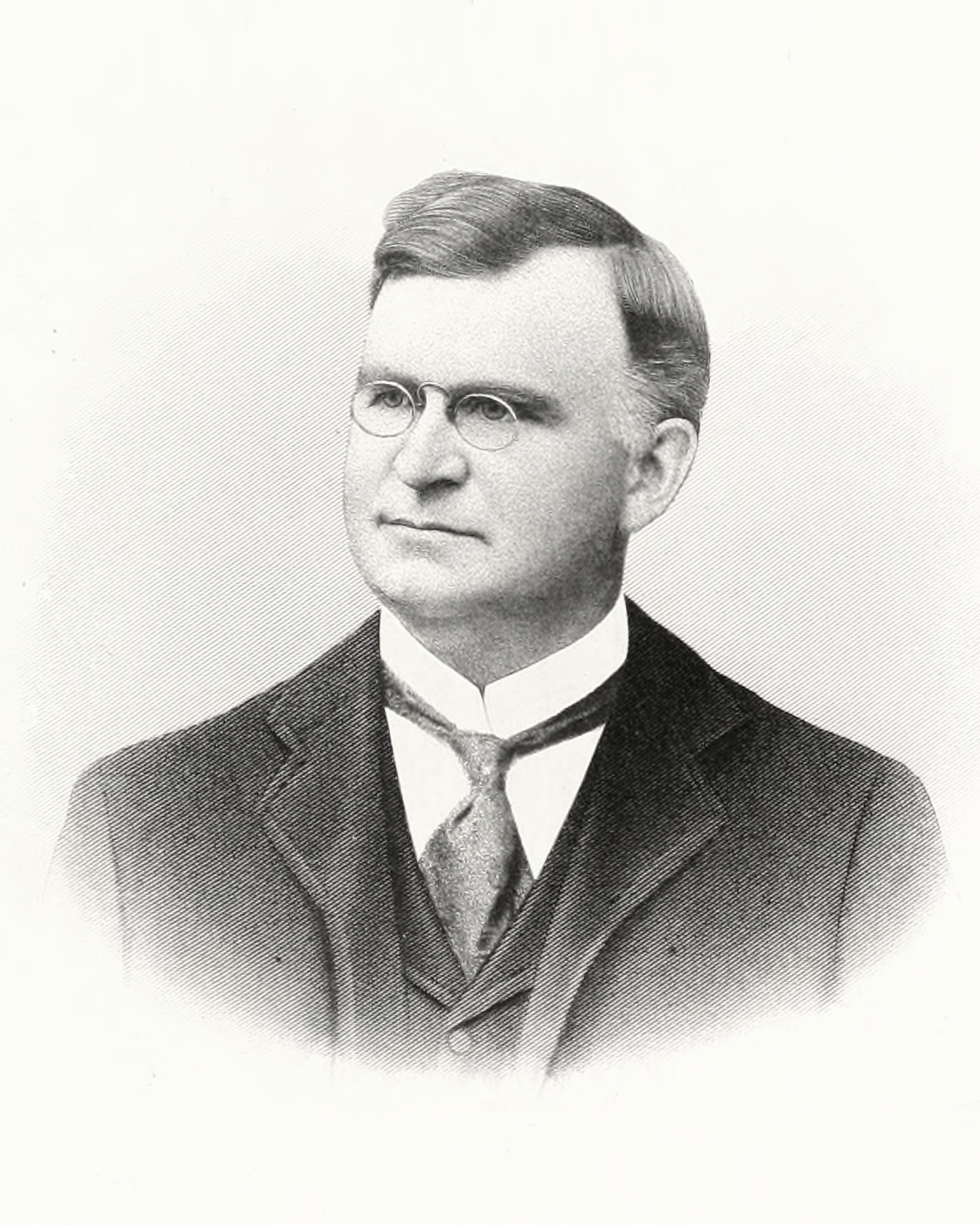
Paul D. Cravath, early Atlanticist leader

Prior to the World Wars, Western European countries were generally preoccupied with continental concerns and creating colonial empires in Africa and Asia, and not relations with North America. Likewise, the United States had little interest in European affairs and was busy with domestic issues and interventions in Latin America and Canada, despite gaining self-governing dominion status through the Canadian Confederation in 1867, had yet to exercise full foreign policy independence as a part of the British Empire. Following World War I, New York lawyer Paul D. Cravath was a noted leader in establishing Atlanticism in the United States. Cravath had become devoted to international affairs during the war, and was later a co-founder and director of the Council on Foreign Relations.

In the aftermath of World War I, while the US Senate was discussing whether or not to ratify the Treaty of Versailles (it ultimately did not), some Congressional Republican Party members expressed their support for a legally binding US alliance with Britain and France as an alternative to the League of Nations's and especially Article 10's open-ended commitments; however, US president Woodrow Wilson of the Democratic Party never seriously explored their offer, instead preferring to focus on his (ultimately unsuccessful) fight to secure US entry into the League of Nations.

=== World War II and Cold War ===
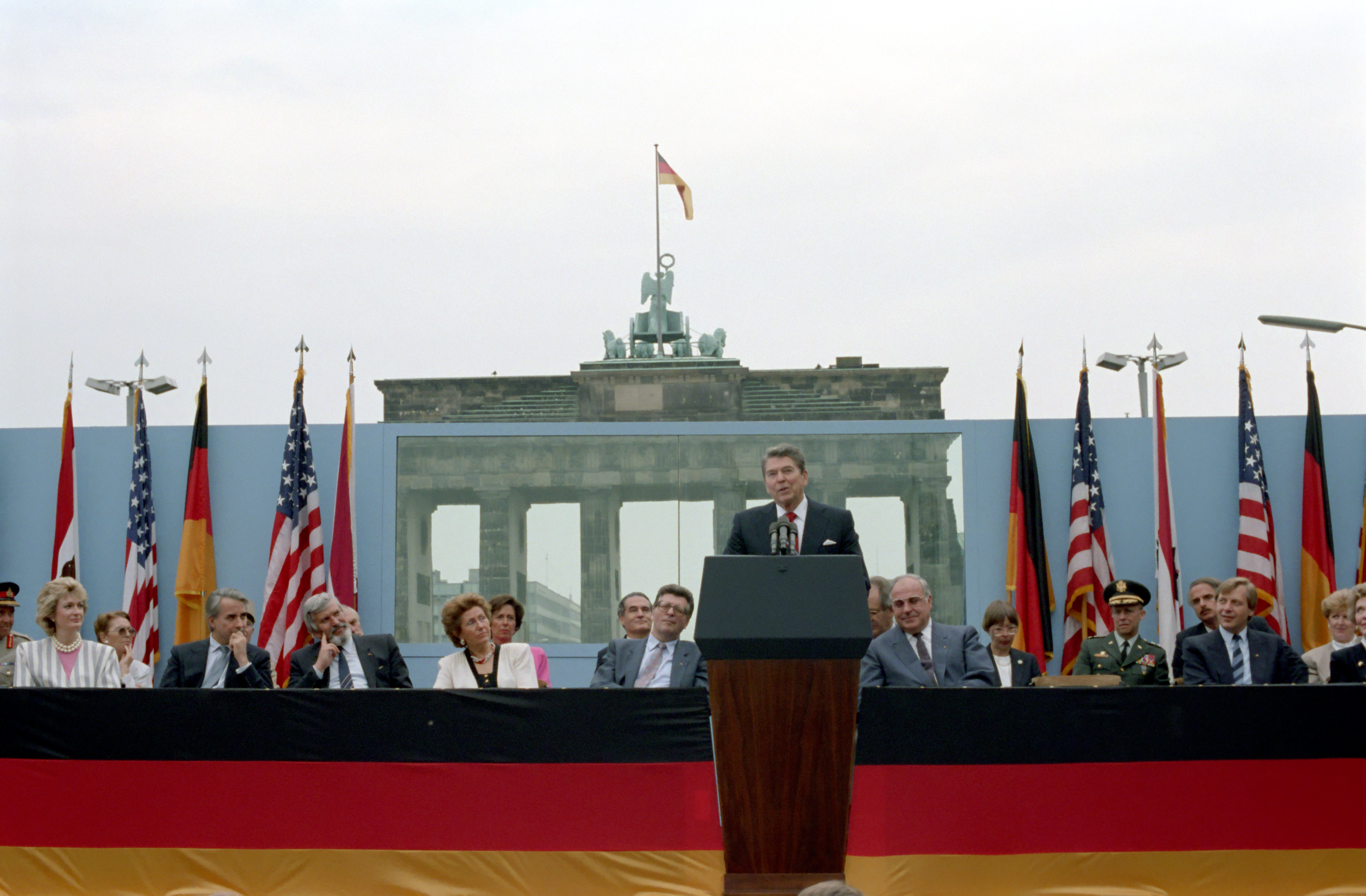
Ronald Reagan speaking in Berlin, 1987 ("Tear down this wall!") with Helmut Kohl, the then Chancellor of Germany. Reagan was a committed Atlanticist.

The experience of having American and Canadian troops fighting with British, French, and other Europeans in Europe during the World Wars fundamentally changed this situation. Although the United States (and to some extent Canada) adopted a more isolationist position between the wars, by the time of the Normandy landings the Allies were well integrated on all policies. The Atlantic Charter of 1941 declared by US President Franklin D. Roosevelt and UK Prime Minister Winston Churchill established the goals of the Allies for the post-war world, and was later adopted by all the Western allies. Following World War II, the Western European countries were anxious to convince the United States to remain engaged in European affairs to deter any possible aggression by the Soviet Union. This led to the 1949 North Atlantic Treaty, which established NATO, the main institutional consequence of Atlanticism, which binds all members to defend the others, and led to the long-term garrisoning of American and Canadian troops in Western Europe. After the end of the Cold War, the relationship between the United States and Europe changed fundamentally, and made the sides less interested in each other. Without the real or perceived threat of the Soviet Union dominating Europe, the continent became much less of a military priority for the United States, and likewise Europe no longer felt as much need for military protection from the US. As a result, the relationship lost much of its strategic importance.

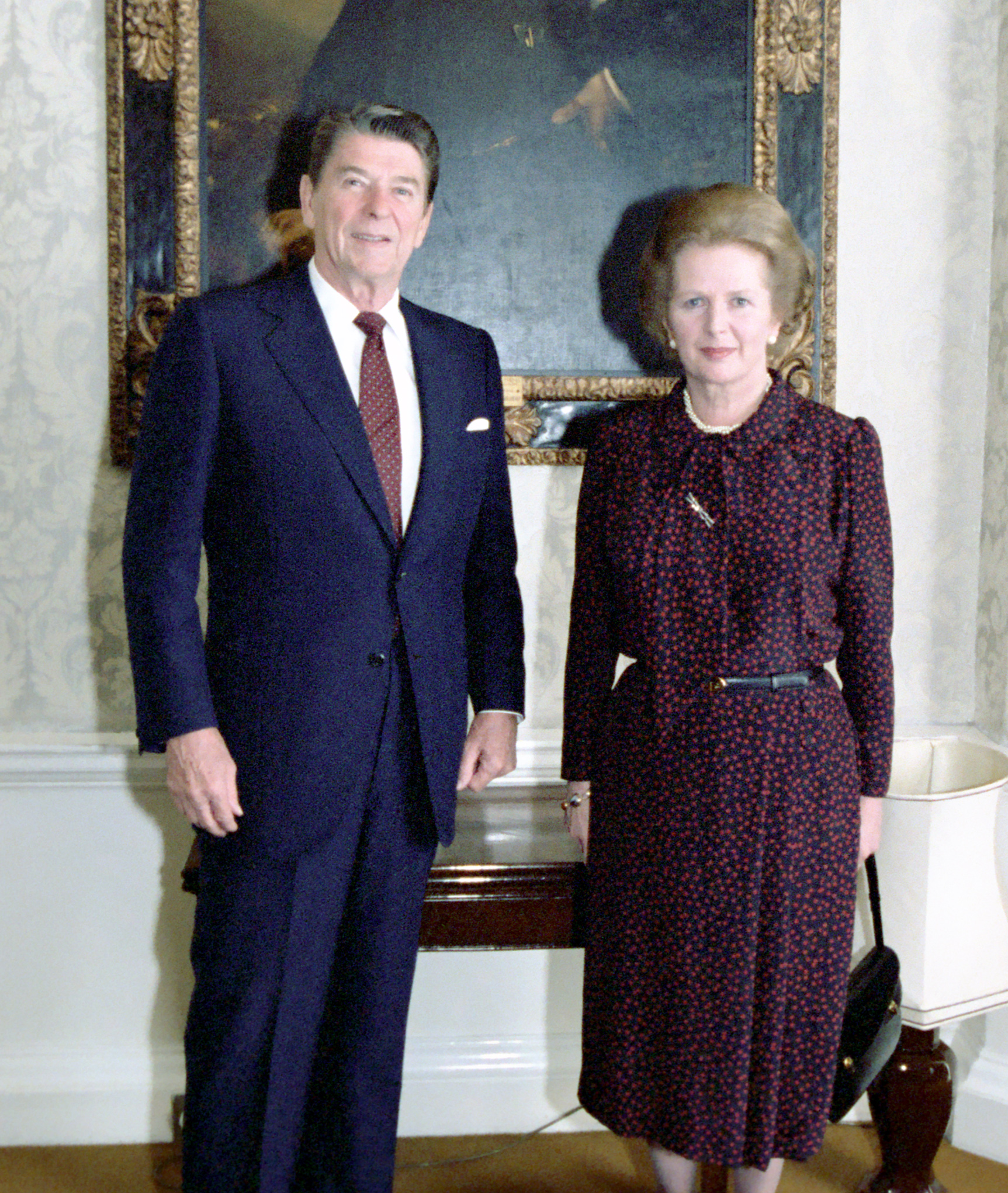
US President Ronald Reagan (left) and UK Prime Minister Margaret Thatcher (right) in 1982

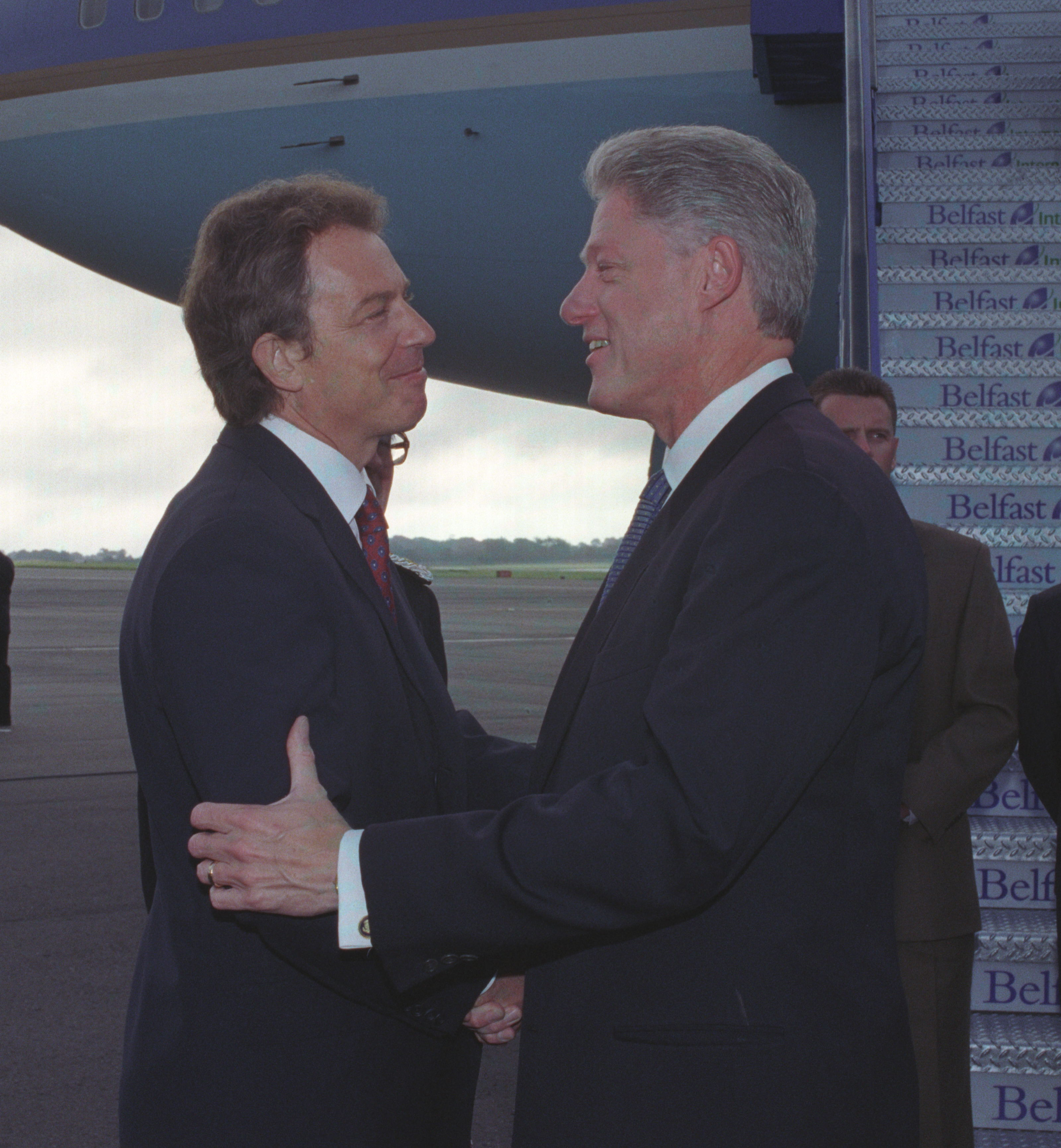
US President Bill Clinton (right) and UK Prime Minister Tony Blair (left) in 1999

The new democracies of the former Warsaw Pact and parts of the fragments of the fractured Yugoslavia took a different view, eagerly embracing Atlanticism as a bulwark against their continued fear of the Soviet Union's key now-separate great power fragment: Russia.

=== 21st century ===
Atlanticism has undergone significant changes in the 21st century in light of terrorism and the Iraq War, the net effect being a renewed questioning of the idea itself and a new insight that the security of the respective countries may require alliance action outside the North Atlantic territory. After the September 11, 2001, attacks, NATO for the first time invoked Article 5 of the North Atlantic Treaty, which states that any attack on a member state will be considered an attack against the entire group of members. Planes of NATO's multi-national AWACS unit patrolled the US skies, and European countries deployed personnel and equipment; however, the Iraq War caused fissures within NATO and the sharp difference of opinion between the US-led backers of the invasion and opponents strained the alliance. Some commentators, such as Robert Kagan and Ivo Daalder, questioned whether Europe and the United States had diverged to such a degree that their alliance was no longer relevant. Later in 2018, Kagan said that "we actually need the United States to be working actively to support and strengthen Europe".

The importance of NATO was reaffirmed during Barack Obama's presidency, although some called him relatively non-Atlanticist compared to predecessors. As part of the Obama Doctrine, Washington supported multilateralism with allies in Europe. The Obama administration also enforced sanctions on Russia with European and Pacific allies after the 2014 Russian annexation of Crimea. After his presidency, Obama also stressed the Atlantic alliance's importance during the first Trump administration, indirectly opposing Donald Trump in the matter.

During the Trump years, tensions rose within NATO, as a result of democratic backsliding in Hungary under former Prime Minister Viktor Orbán and Turkey under current President Recep Tayyip Erdoğan, and Trump's comments against NATO members and the alliance. Kagan echoed common criticisms that Trump undermined the alliance. Despite this, NATO gained two new member countries (Montenegro and North Macedonia) during that time. The importance of NATO in Europe increased due to the continuing threat of the Russian military and intelligence apparatus and the uncertainty of Russian actions in former Soviet countries, and various threats in the Middle East. German–Russian economic relations became an issue in the Atlantic relationship due to Nord Stream 2, among other disagreements such as trade disputes between the United States and the European Union (EU).

US President Joe Biden emphasized multilateralism and the importance of international alliances, making the restoration and strengthening of the Atlanticist alliance a key priority. As the Biden administration began, top officials of the EU expressed optimism about the Atlantic relationship. Following the February 2022 Russian invasion of Ukraine, journalists observed that the Russian aggression led to a united political response from the EU, making the defensive relevance of the Atlanticist alliance more widely known, and increasing the popularity of NATO accession in countries like Sweden and Finland. Finland joined NATO on April 4, 2023, and Sweden on March 7, 2024.

During the second Trump administration, there were further tensions as Trump established the Donroe Doctrine. In January 2026, while remarking on Greenland crisis caused by US President Trump and his proposed US acquisition of Greenland, Belgium's Prime Minister Bart De Wever stated that eight decades of Atlanticism could be coming to an end. Trump's pursuit of Greenland strained NATO, which had already been under pressure following a year of criticism and confrontational rhetoric from his administration. Speaking at the World Economic Forum on January 21, he directed some of his strongest remarks at European nations. In comments implying that the United States was indispensable to global security and economic stability, he stated, "Without us, most of the countries don't even work", and also joked about US intervention in World War II by telling the audience that without it they would "all be speaking German and a little Japanese".

== Ideology ==
Atlanticism is a belief in the necessity of cooperation between North America and Europe. The term can imply a belief that the bilateral relationship between Europe and the United States is important above all others, including intra-European cooperation, especially when it comes to security issues. The term can also be used "as a shorthand for the transatlantic security architecture." A supranational union integration of the North Atlantic area had emerged as a focus of thinking among intellectuals on both sides of the Atlantic already in the late 19th century.

Although it was not known as Atlanticism at the time (the term was coined in 1950), they developed an approach coupling both soft and hard power, which would to some extent integrate the two sides of the Atlantic. The idea of an attractive "nucleus" union was the greatest soft power element; the empirical fact of the hegemonic global strength such a union would hold was the hard power element. This approach was eventually implemented to a certain degree in the form of NATO, the Group of Seven (G7), and other Atlanticist institutions. In the long debate between Atlanticism and its critics in the 20th century, the main argument was whether deep and formal Atlanticist integration would serve to attract those still outside to seek to join, as Atlanticists argued, or alienate the rest of the world and drive them into opposite alliances. The Atlanticist perspective that informed the scheme of relations between the United States and the Western European countries after the end of World War II was informed by political expedience and a strong civilizational bond. Realists, neutralists, and pacifists, nationalists, and internationalists tended to believe it would do the latter, citing the Warsaw Pact as the proof of their views and treating it as the inevitable Realpolitik counterpart of NATO.

Broadly speaking, Atlanticism is particularly strong in the United Kingdom, which is linked to the Special Relationship, as well as Eastern and Central Europe (the countries east of Germany and west of Russia's contiguous territory). There are numerous reasons for its strength in Central and Eastern Europe: primarily the view of the United States as an altruistic power, particularly after World War I (US President Wilson's Fourteen Points) and World War II (albeit inconsistent), the major role of the US during the Cold War (culminating in the geopolitical defeat of the Soviet Union and the end of communist rule), its relative enthusiasm for bringing the countries of the region into Atlanticist institutions such as NATO, and a suspicion of the intentions of the major Western European powers. Some commentators see countries such as Poland and the United Kingdom among those who generally hold strong Atlanticist views, while seeing countries such as Germany and France tending to promote continental views and a strong EU.

In the early 21st century, Atlanticism has tended to be slightly stronger on the political right in Europe (although many variations exist from country to country), and on the center-left in the United States. While this partisan division should not be overstated, it exists and has grown since the end of the Cold War. Trans-Atlantic trade and political ties have remained mostly strong throughout the Cold War and beyond; however, the larger trend has been continentalist economic integration with the European Economic Area (EEA) and the North American Free Trade Agreement (NAFTA) notably dividing the Atlantic region into two rival trade blocs. Despite this, political commentators do not see the two processes as being necessarily opposed to one another, and some believe regional integration can reinforce Atlanticism. Article 2 of the North Atlantic Treaty, added by Canada, also attempted to bind the nations together on economic and political fronts.

== Institutions ==
The North Atlantic Council is the premier, governmental forum for discussion and decision-making in an Atlanticist context. The World Bank (WB) and International Monetary Fund (IMF) are also considered Atlanticist. Under a tacit agreement, the former is led by an American and the latter European. Other organizations that can be considered Atlanticist in origin are NATO, the OECD, the G7, the North Atlantic Cooperation Council (NACC), the Euro-Atlantic Partnership Council (EAPC), the German Marshall Fund (GMF), Atlantik-Brücke, European Horizons, and the Atlantic Council.

== New Atlanticism ==
New Atlanticism refers to a modern revision of Atlanticism, as defined by the New Atlantic Charter, to address the ongoing strategic competition between the liberal international order and Russia and China.

== Prominent Atlanticists ==
Well-known Atlanticists include former US Presidents Franklin Roosevelt, Harry Truman, Ronald Reagan, and Joe Biden; UK Prime Ministers Winston Churchill, Margaret Thatcher, Tony Blair, and Gordon Brown; former US Secretary of State Dean Acheson; former Assistant Secretary of War and perennial presidential advisor John J. McCloy; former US National Security Advisor Zbigniew Brzezinski; former NATO Secretaries-General Joseph Luns and Javier Solana; and Council on Foreign Relations co-founder Paul D. Cravath.

== See also ==
- Bilderberg Group
- British-American Project
- Canada–European Union relations
- Columbian exchange
- Eurasianism
- European integration
- North American integration
- Pro-Americanism
- Transatlantic Free Trade Area
- United States–European Union relations
- Western world
