= Russian imperialism =

Maximum territorial extent of the Russian Empire, which existed from 1721 to 1917.

Russian imperialism broadly refers to the political, economic, cultural, or military power exerted by various Russian states over foreign countries and territories. This includes the actions of the contemporary Russian Federation in addition to the relatively recent historical examples of the Tsardom of Russia and the Russian Empire, as well as the Soviet Union, whose affairs were dominated by the Russian SFSR. Some scholars of postcolonialism have highlighted the lack of global attention given to Russian and Soviet imperialism in the discipline.

After the fall of Constantinople in 1453, the Grand Principality of Moscow declared itself to be the third Rome—primarily on the grounds that it was the legitimate successor to the Byzantine Empire as the world's new centre of Orthodox Christianity. Beginning in the 1550s, Russia conquered, on average, territory equivalent in size to the present-day Netherlands every year for the next 150 years across parts of Eastern Europe, North Asia (Siberia), Central Asia, and the Caucasus. Albeit to a lesser extent compared to their holdings in Eurasia, Russian colonists also established a number of outposts in North America. In the late 18th century, Russian emperors promoted the concept of an "all-Russian nation" comprising "Great Russians" (Russians), "Little Russians" (Ukrainians), and "White Russians" (Belarusians) to bolster their claims to certain areas of the partitioned Polish–Lithuanian Commonwealth. Emperor Nicholas I made "Orthodoxy, Autocracy, and Nationality" the official ideology of the state as part of an attempt to unite the many peoples living in it through adherence to the Russian Orthodox Church, loyalty to the emperor, and Russian-ness. By the late 19th century, the Russian Empire covered approximately one-sixth of the world's landmass, making it the third-largest empire in history.

During the Russian Civil War, the Bolsheviks seized much of the territory of the former Russian Empire and founded the Russian Socialist Federative Soviet Republic, which would serve as the foundation of the Soviet Union. While claiming to be anti-imperialist, it had many similarities with historical empires. The Bolshevik movement re-conquered the independent states that had seceded amidst the Russian Revolution and incorporated them into the newly declared Soviet Union, although it was only partially successful in restoring the Russian Empire's borders. Over the course of the 20th century, the Soviet Union was involved in many foreign interventions and regime changes, while pushing Sovietization in the Eastern Bloc and throughout the Second World. Some of the most prominent acts of Soviet imperialism and internal colonialism were carried out during the Stalinist era, including the forced population transfers and man-made famines that targeted minority groups in several regions of the country, but particularly in Central Asia, while Soviet ambitions for the European continent were also brought to fruition during this period. Initially seeking to divide territory and spheres of influence with Nazi Germany through the Molotov–Ribbentrop Pact in 1939, the Soviet Union's military campaigns during World War II enabled it to occupy all European countries up to and including parts of Germany and Austria by 1945. With the onset of the Cold War in 1947, these countries came to be widely regarded as Soviet satellite states, although Albania, Romania, and Yugoslavia broke away from Moscow in high-profile rifts by the 1960s.

Since the 2010s, analysts have described Russia under Vladimir Putin as a neo-imperialist state, highlighting irredentist rhetoric and claims to the territories of several former Union Republics. Since the collapse of the Soviet Union in 1991, Russia has sought to maintain influence over the post-Soviet states through political or military interventions and the establishment of regional organizations, such as the Commonwealth of Independent States. Under Putin's rule, Russia occupied parts of Georgia in 2008, parts of Ukraine in 2014, and commenced a full-scale invasion of Ukraine in 2022, while also establishing domination over Belarus. The Putin regime has revived imperial-era ideas of the "Russian world" and the ideology of Eurasianism. It has conducted large-scale disinformation campaigns and leveraged members of the Russian diaspora to undermine the sovereignty of other countries. Russia is also accused of practicing neo-colonialism in Africa, primarily through the activities of the Wagner Group and Africa Corps.

== Views on Russian imperialism ==
Montesquieu wrote that "The Moscovites cannot leave the empire" and they "are all slaves". Historian Alexander Etkind describes a phenomenon of "reversed gradient", where people living near the center of the Russian Empire experienced greater oppression than the ones on the edges. Jean-Jacques Rousseau in turn argued that Poland was not free because of Russian imperialism. In 1836, Nikolai Gogol said that Saint Petersburg was "something similar to a European colony in America", remarking that there were as many foreigners as people of the native ethnicity. According to Aleksey Khomyakov, the Russian elite was "a colony of eclectic Europeans, thrown into a country of savages" with a "colonial relationship" between the two. A similar colonial aspect was identified by Konstantin Kavelin.

Russian imperialism has been argued to be different from other European colonial empires due to its empire being overland rather than overseas, which meant that rebellions could be more easily put down, with some lands being reconquered soon after they were lost. The terrestrial basis of the empire has also been seen as a factor which made it more divided than sea-based ones due to the difficulties of communication and transport over land at the time.

Russian imperialism has been linked to the labour-intensive and low productivity economic system based on serfdom and despotic rule, which required constant increase in the amount of land under cultivation to legitimise the rule and provide satisfaction to the subjects. The political system in turn depended on land as a resource to reward officeholders, and thus the political elite made territorial expansion an intentional project.

=== Internal colonization ===
According to Vasily Klyuchevsky, Russia has the "history of a country that colonizes itself". Vladimir Lenin saw Russia's underdeveloped territories as internal colonialism. This concept had first been introduced in the context of Russia by August von Haxthausen in 1843. Sergey Solovyov argued that this was because Russia "was not a colony that was separated from the metropolitan land by oceans". For Afanasy Shchapov, this process was primarily driven by ecological imperialism, whereby the fur trade and fishing were driving the conquest of Siberia and Alaska. Other followers of Klyuchevsky identified the forms of colonization driven by military or monastic expansion, among others. Pavel Milyukov meanwhile noted the violence of this self-colonizing process. A similarity was later noted between Russian self-colonialism and the American frontier by Mark Bassin.

== Ideologies of Russian imperialism ==
The territorial expansion of the empire gave the autocratic rulers of Russia additional legitimacy, while also giving the subjugated population a source of national pride. The legitimation of the empire was later done through different ideologies. After the Fall of Constantinople, Moscow named itself the third Rome, following the Roman and Byzantine Empires. In a panegyric letter to Grand Duke Vasili III composed in 1510, Russian monk Philotheus (Filofey) of Pskov proclaimed, "Two Romes have fallen. The third stands. And there will be no fourth. No one shall replace your Christian Tsardom!". This led to the concept of a messianic Orthodox Russian nation as the Holy Rus. Russia claimed to be the protector of Orthodox Christians as it expanded into the territories of the Ottoman Empire during wars such as the Crimean War.

After the victory of monarchist Coalition in 1815, Russia promulgated the Holy Alliance with Prussia and Austria to reinstate the divine right of kings and Christian values in European political life, as pursued by Alexander I under the influence of his spiritual adviser Baroness Barbara von Krüdener. It was written by the Tsar and edited by Ioannis Kapodistrias and Alexandru Sturdza. In the first draft Tsar Alexander I made appeals to mysticism through a proposed unified Christian empire, with a unified imperial army, that was seen as disconcerting by the other monarchies. Following revision, a more pragmatic version of the alliance was adopted by Russia, Prussia, and Austria. The document was called "an apocalypse of diplomacy" by French diplomat Dominique-Georges-Frédéric Dufour de Pradt. The Holy Alliance was largely used to suppress internal dissent, censoring the press and shutting down parliaments as part of "The Reaction".

Under Nicholas I of Russia, Orthodoxy, Autocracy, and Nationality became the official state ideology. It required the Orthodox Church to take an essential role in politics and life, required the central rule of a single autocrat or absolute ruler, and proclaimed that the Russian people were uniquely capable of unifying a large empire due to special characteristics. Similar to the broader "divine right of kings", the emperor's power would be seen as resolving any contradictions in the world and creating an ideal "celestial" order. Hosking argued that the trio of "Orthodoxy, Autocracy, Nationality" had key flaws in two of its main pillars, as the church was entirely dependent and submissive to the state, and the concept of nationality was underdeveloped because many officials were Baltic German and the revolutionary ideas of nation states were a "muffled echo" in a system that relied on serfdom. In practice, this left autocracy as the only viable pillar. Despite its underdeveloped and contradictory nature, the imperial "All-Russian" nationality was embraced by many imperial subjects (including Jews and Germans) and thus did provide some cultural and political support for the Empire. This national concept first demonstrated its political importance near the end of the 18th century, as a means of legitimizing Russian imperial claims to the eastern territories of the partitioned Polish–Lithuanian Commonwealth.

In the 19th century, pan-Slavism became a new legitimation theory for the empire. Though it originated in Western Slavic (Czech and Slovak) intellectual circles in the 1830s, and found support from anti-imperial Ukrainian movements like the Brotherhood of Saints Cyril and Methodius, pan-Slavism was later co-opted by conservative Russian nationalists as an ideological support for the Empire's power projection, particularly in the Balkans. "By the second half of the 19th century, Russian publicists adopted--and transformed--the ideology of Pan-Slavism. Convinced of their own political superiority and armed with self-confidence in their self-professed role as protector against the threat from German and Ottoman Turkish enemies, Russian publicists argued that all Slavs, for their own best interests, might as well merge with the 'Great Russians.'"

The "Russian geography" poem by a notable 19th century Russian poet Fyodor Tyutchev was considered by philologist Roman Leibov to express ideology of the worldwide Slavic empire:

Moscow and Peter's grad, the city of Constantine,
these are the capitals of Russian kingdom.
But where is their limit? And where are their frontiers
to the north, the east, the south and the setting sun?
The Fate will reveal this to future generations.
Seven inland seas and seven great rivers
from the Nile to the Neva, from the Elbe to China,
from the Volga to the Euphrates, from Ganges to the Danube.
That's the Russian Kingdom, and let it be forever,
just as the Spirit foretold and Daniel prophesied.

One of the leading theorists and political leaders of the Eurasianist movement, Nikolai Trubetzkoy, considered the predecessor of the Russian state to be the Mongol Empire founded by Genghis Khan, and not the principalities of Kievan Rus'. Genghis Khan was the first to unite the entire Eurasian continent, and as Trubetzkoy put it, "by its very nature, Eurasia is historically predestined to comprise a single state entity."

== Irredentism ==
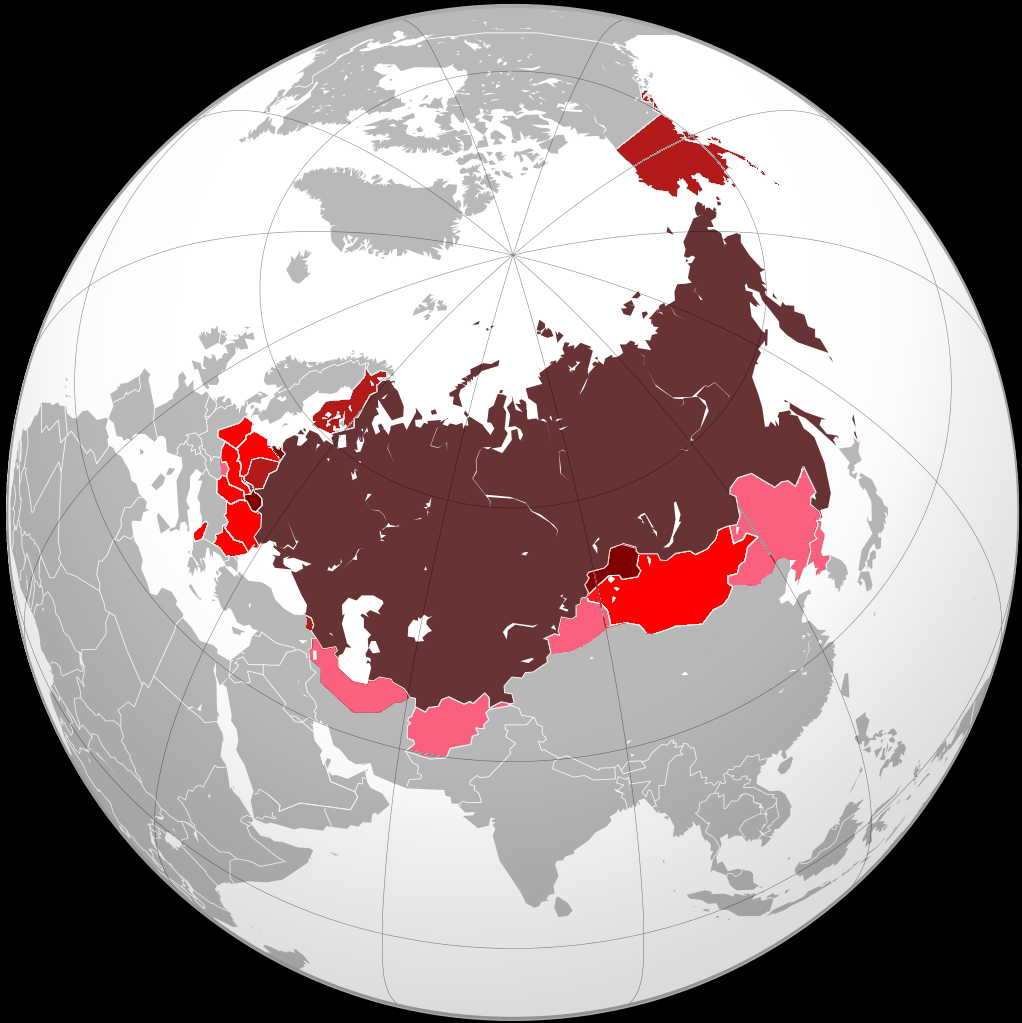
Russia and its territorial possessions throughout the Imperial (1721–1917) and the Soviet era (1922–1991) (Uryankhay Krai (Tuva in 1914–1921)) Soviet / post-Soviet territories that were never part of Imperial Russia: Tuva (1944–), East Prussia (1945–), western Ukraine (1939–1991), and Kuril Islands (1945–) Imperial territories / states that did not become part of the Soviet Union: Finland (1809–1917), Poland (1815–1915), and Kars (1878–1918), and Alaska (Russian America) (1741–1867) Soviet sphere of influence: Warsaw Pact (1945–1991; Albania until 1968; East Germany until 1990), Mongolia (1924–1991), excluding Yugoslavia (1945–1948) Imperial sphere of influence and Soviet military occupation: northern Iran (1914–1918; 1941–1946), Manchuria (1892–1906; 1945–1946), northern Korea (1892–1906; 1945–1948), Xinjiang (1934), eastern Austria (1945–1955), and Afghanistan (1979–1989), excluding Greece (1826–1829; 1944–1945) and Finnmark, Norway (1944–1946)

Russian irredentism (Russian: русский ирредентизм) are territorial claims made by the Russian Federation to regions that were historically part of the Russian Empire and the Soviet Union, which Russian nationalists regard as part of the "Russian world". It is an expansionist movement that seeks to create a Greater Russia by politically incorporating ethnic Russians and Russian speakers living in territories bordering Russia. This ideology has been significantly defined by the regime of Vladimir Putin, who has governed the country since 1999. It is linked to Russian neo-imperialism.

Russian troops currently occupy parts of three neighbouring countries: southern and eastern Ukraine, Abkhazia and South Ossetia in Georgia, and the Transnistria region of Moldova. Since it began in 2014, the Russo-Ukrainian War has been described by much of the international community as being a culmination of Russia's irredentist policies towards Ukraine. Examples of these irredentist policies being implemented in this conflict include the Russian annexation of Crimea in 2014 and the ongoing Russian invasion of Ukraine, which saw the Russian annexation of southeastern Ukraine in 2022.

=== Analysis ===
On 12 October 2022, the UN General Assembly adopted Resolution ES 11/4 declaring that the staged referendums and attempted annexation are invalid and illegal under international law. In favour: 143 Against: 5 Abstained: 35 Absent: 10

Some Russian nationalists seek to annex parts of the "near abroad", such as the Baltic states. Governor of the Russian occupation of Zaporizhzhia Oblast Yevgeny Balitsky has described how "all of the Baltics" were "all our lands, and our people live there," calling to "correct this...through the might of Russian weapons" and "get our people back, the former subjects of the Russian Empire". Others also some fear potential escalation due to Russian irredentist aspirations in Northern Kazakhstan.

Looking at the Russian efforts as a whole, the news network Al Jazeera has quoted University of San Francisco scholar Stephen Zunes as remarking, "The level of physical devastation and casualties thus far over a relatively short period is perhaps the [worst] in recent decades which, combined with the irredentist aims of the conquest, makes Russia's war on Ukraine particularly reprehensible in the eyes of the international community."

U.S. news publication The Washington Post has stated that the Russian government could start a chain reaction of irredentist mass violence, which then "could break the international order".

== Russian colonial expansion ==
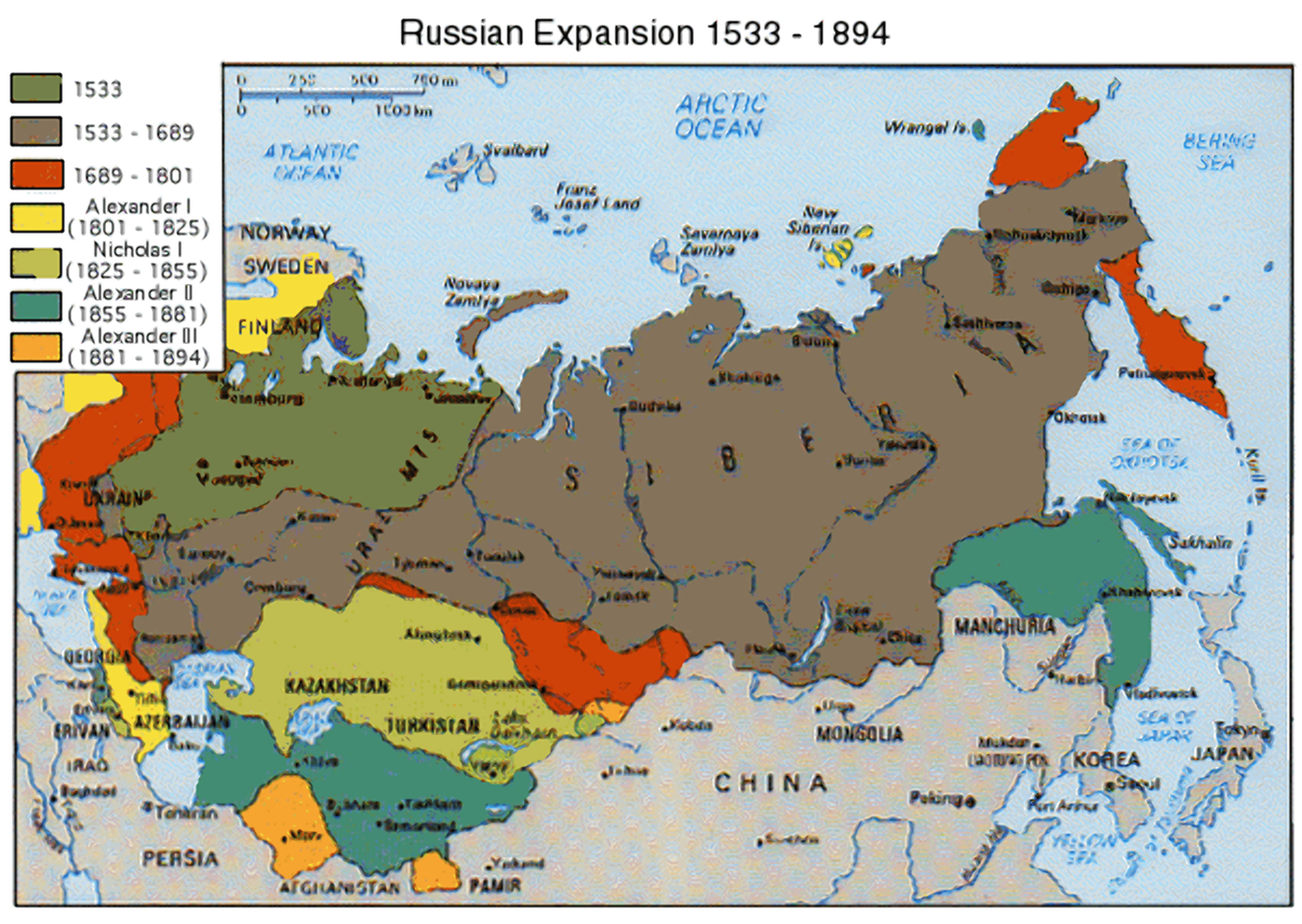
Russian expansion in Eurasia between 1533 and 1894

From the 16th century onwards Russia conquered, on average, territory the size of the Netherlands every year for 150 years. From roughly the 16th century to the 20th century, the Russian Empire followed an expansionist policy. (Note: The state expanded eastwards, westwards and southwards, which led to the conquests of Siberia, the Caucasus, Turkestan, and Uzbekistan.) Few of these actions had irredentist justifications, though the conquest of parts of the Ottoman Empire in the Caucasus in 1877 to bring Armenian Christians under the protection of the Tsar may represent one example. Russia has also had an enduring interest in Constantinople (Istanbul), which was envisioned as the centre of Russian power.

=== Siberia and the Far East ===
Russian expansionism has largely benefited from the proximity of the mostly uninhabited Siberia, which has been incrementally conquered by Russia since the reign of Ivan the Terrible (1530–1584). The Russian colonization of Siberia and conquest of its indigenous peoples has been compared to European colonization of the Americas and its natives, with similar negative impacts on the natives and the appropriation of their land. Other researchers, however, consider that settlement of Siberia differed from European colonization in not resulting in native depopulation, as well as providing gainful employment and integrating indigenous population into settlers' society. The North Pacific also became the target of similar expansion establishing the Russian Far East.

In 1858, during the Second Opium War, Russia strengthened and eventually annexed the north bank of the Amur River and the coast down to the Korean border from China in the "Unequal Treaties" of Treaty of Aigun (1858) and the Convention of Peking (1860). During the Boxer Rebellion, the Russian Empire invaded Manchuria in 1900, and the Blagoveshchensk massacre occurred against Chinese residents on the Russian side of the border. Furthermore, the empire at times controlled concession territories in China, notably the Chinese Eastern Railway and concessions in Tianjin and Russian Dalian.

Between 1800 and 1914, 5.5 million European Russians and other Slavs moved to Siberia and the Far East, outnumbering the local Asian populace, except in Yakutia and Kamchatka, where they stayed in minority. This colonization continued even during the Soviet Union in the 20th century.

=== Central Asia ===
The Russian conquest of Central Asia took place over several decades. In 1847–1864 they crossed the eastern Kazakh Steppe and built a line of forts along the northern border of Kyrgyzstan. In 1864–1868 they moved south from Kyrgyzstan, captured Tashkent and Samarkand and dominated the Khanates of Kokand and Bokhara. The next step was to turn this triangle into a rectangle by crossing the Caspian Sea. In 1873 the Russians conquered Khiva, and in 1881 they took western Turkmenistan. In 1884 they took the Merv oasis and eastern Turkmenistan. In 1885 further expansion south toward Afghanistan was blocked by the British. In 1893–1895 the Russians occupied the high Pamir Mountains in the southeast. According to historian Alexander Morrison, "Russia's expansion southwards across the Kazakh steppe into the riverine oases of Turkestan was one of the nineteenth century's most rapid and dramatic examples of imperial conquest."

In the south, the Great Game was a political and diplomatic confrontation that existed for most of the 19th century and beginning of the 20th century between the British Empire and the Russian Empire over Central and South Asia. Britain feared that Russia planned to invade India and that this was the goal of Russia's expansion in Central Asia, while Russia continued its conquest of Central Asia. Indeed, multiple 19th-century Russian invasion plans of India are attested, including the Duhamel and Khrulev plans of the Crimean War (1853–1856), among later plans that never materialized.

Historian A. I. Andreyev stated that, "in the days of the Great Game, Mongolia was an object of imperialist encroachment by Russia, as Tibet was for the British." In the Anglo-Russian Convention of 1907, the Russian Empire and British Empire officially ended their Great Game rivalry to focus on opposing the German Empire, dividing Iran into British and Russian portions. In 1908, the Persian Constitutional Revolution sought to establish a democratic civil society in Iran, with an elected Majilis, a relatively free press and other reforms. The Russian Empire intervened in the Persian Constitutional Revolution to support the Shah and reactionary factions. The Cossacks bombarded the Majilis, Russia had earlier established the Persian Cossack Brigade in 1879, a force which was led by Russian officers and served as a vehicle for Russian influence in Iran.

=== Europe ===
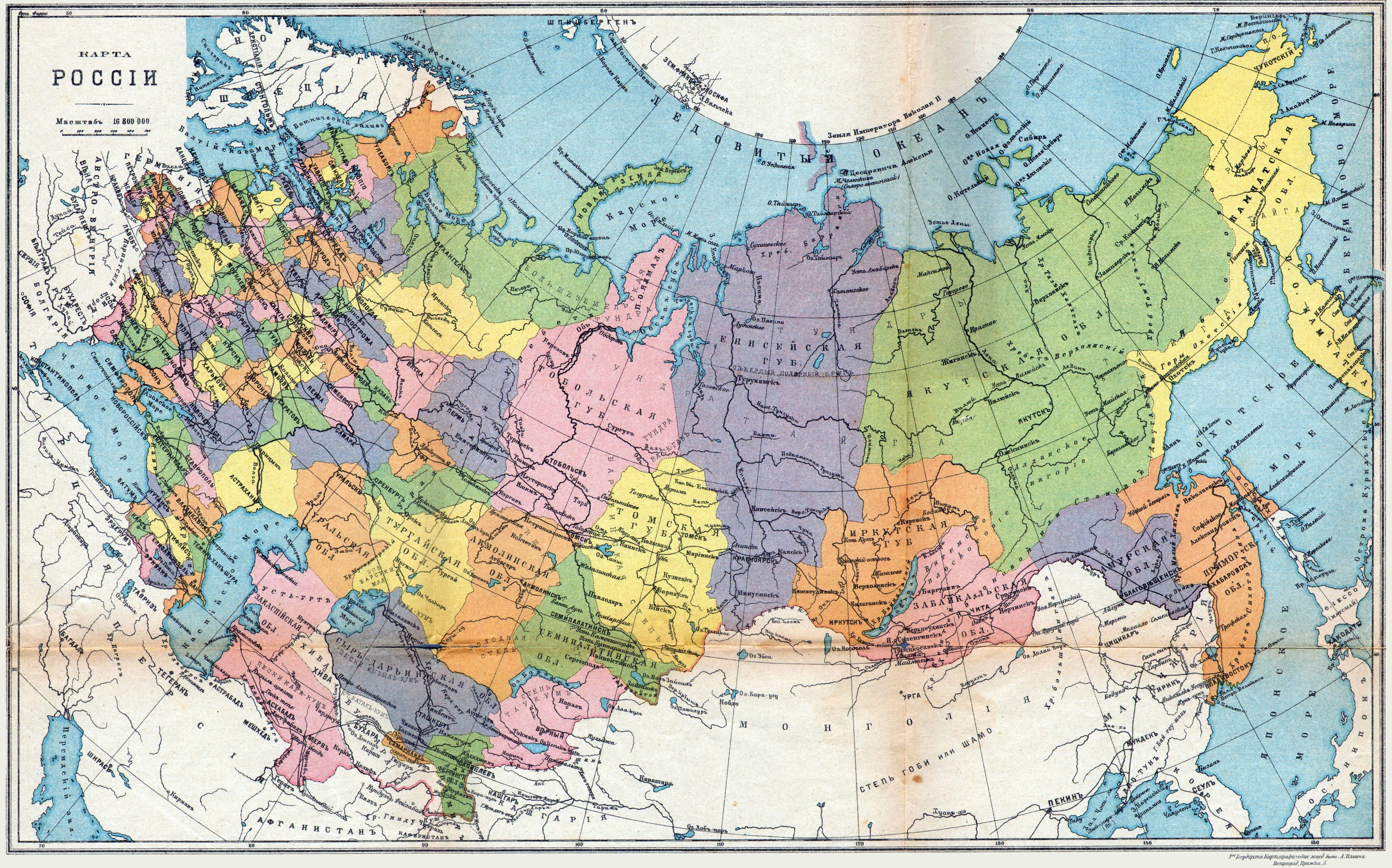
Map of provinces of the Russian Empire, 1898

During this epoch, Russia also followed a policy of westward expansion. Following the Swedish defeat in the Finnish War of 1808–1809 and the signing of the Treaty of Fredrikshamn on 17 September 1809, the eastern half of Sweden, the area that then became Finland, was incorporated into the Russian Empire as an autonomous grand duchy. In the late 19th century, the policy of Russification of Finland aimed to limit the special status of the Grand Duchy of Finland and possibly ending its political autonomy and culturally assimilating it. Russification policies were also pursued in Ukraine and Belarus.

In the aftermath of the Russo-Turkish War (1806–12) and the ensuing Treaty of Bucharest (1812), the eastern half of the Principality of Moldavia (which came to be known as Bessarabia), an Ottoman vassal state, and some areas formerly under direct Ottoman rule, came under the rule of the Russian Empire. At the Congress of Vienna (1815), Russia gained sovereignty over Congress Poland, which on paper was an autonomous Kingdom in personal union with Russia. However, the Russian Emperors generally disregarded any restrictions on their power. It was, therefore, little more than a puppet state. The autonomy was severely curtailed following uprisings in 1830–31 and 1863, as the country became governed by viceroys, and later divided into governorates (provinces).

=== Russian overseas expansion ===
Eastwards expansion was followed by the Russian colonization of North America across the Pacific Ocean. Russian promyshlenniki (trappers and hunters) quickly developed the maritime fur trade, which instigated several conflicts between the Aleuts and Russians in the 1760s. By the late 1780s, trade relations had opened with the Tlingits, and in 1799 the Russian-American Company (RAC) was formed in order to monopolize the fur trade, also serving as an imperialist vehicle for the Russification of Alaska Natives.

The Russian Empire also acquired the island of Sakhalin which was turned into one of history's largest prison colonies. Initially, Russian maritime incursions into the waters surrounding Hokkaido began in the late eighteenth century, spurring Japan to map and explore its northern island surroundings. Sakhalin had been inhabited by indigenous peoples including Ainu, Uilta, and Nivkh, despite the island nominally paying tribute to the Qing dynasty. After Russia acquired Manchuria from the Qing in the 1858 Treaty of Aigun, they also acquired from the Qing, a nominal claim to Sakhalin across the strait. With the earlier 1855 Treaty of Shimoda, a joint settler colony of both Russian and Japanese was temporarily created, despite conflicts. However, with the 1875 Treaty of Saint Petersburg the Russian Empire was granted Sakhalin in exchange for Japan gaining the Kuril Islands.

The furthest Russian colonies were in Fort Elizavety and Fort Alexander, Russian forts on the Hawaiian Islands, built in the early 19th century by the Russian-American Company as the result of an alliance with High Chief Kaumualiʻi, as well as in Sagallo, a short-lived Russian settlement established in 1889 on the Gulf of Tadjoura in French Somaliland (modern-day Djibouti). The Russians were forced to evacuate Sagallo after a French invasion. The southernmost settlement established in North America was at Fort Ross, California.

The desire of particular Russian rulers to secure warm water ports and access to the open sea has at times been associated with Russian expansionism. Such an objective fueled Peter the Great's desire to secure access to the Baltic Sea, to develop Russian navigation in the Arctic and to build the Russian Navy. It was also a component of Catherine the Great's Greek Project which envisaged securing Russian access to the Turkish Straits. It also fueled Russia's later drive to develop its access to the Pacific Ocean. These objectives were not ones that were consistently pursued by Russian governments. However, when they were pursued they often brought Russia into conflict with neighbouring states and other Great Powers.

== Soviet imperialism ==
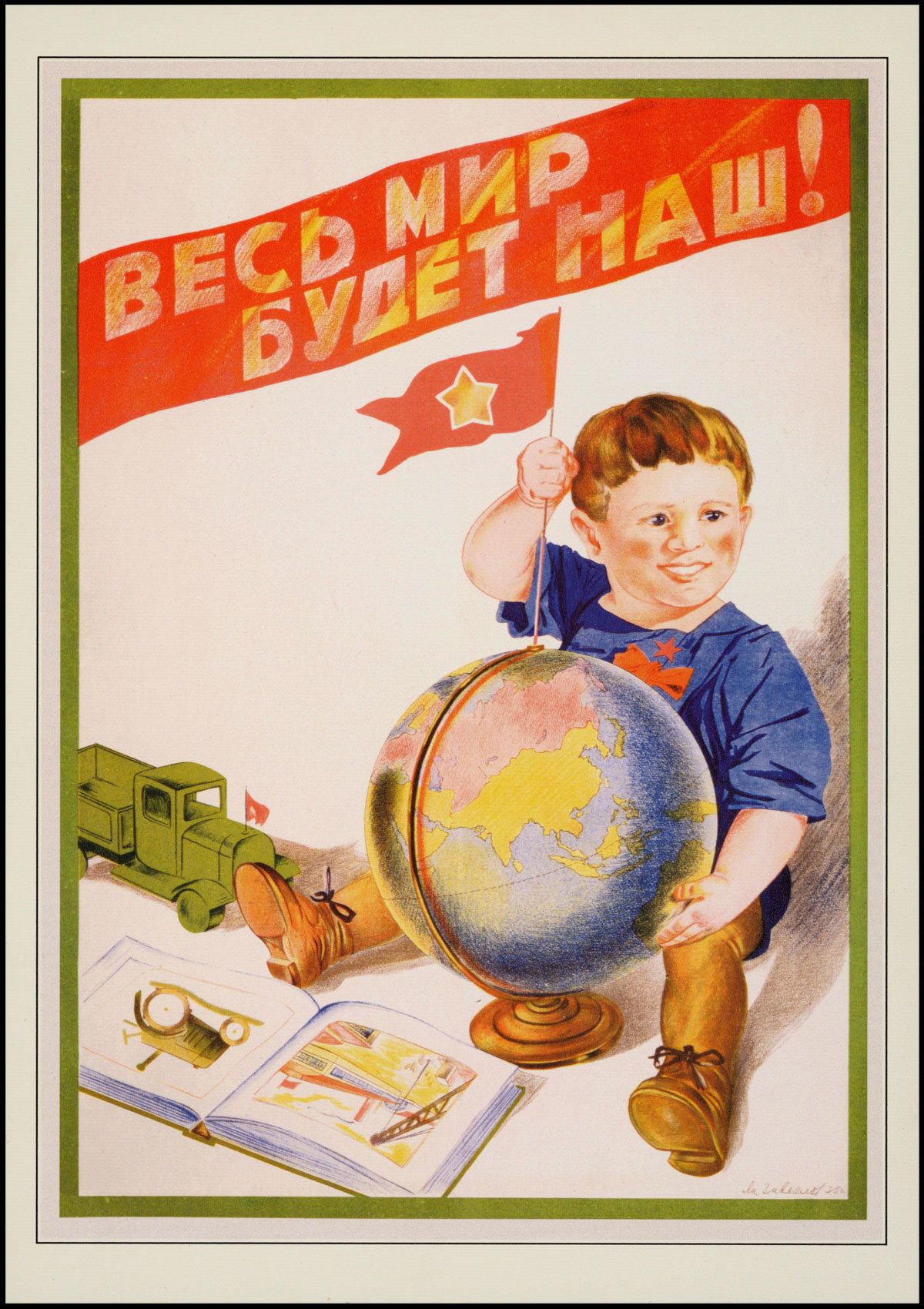
A Stalinist era Soviet poster with the inscription "The whole world will be ours!"

Although the Soviet Union declared itself anti-imperialist, it exhibited tendencies common to historic empires. This argument is traditionally held to have originated in Richard Pipes's book The Formation of the Soviet Union (1954). Several scholars, such as Seweryn Bialer, hold that the Soviet Union was a hybrid entity containing elements common to both multinational empires and nation states. It has also been argued that the Soviet Union practiced colonialism similar to conventional imperial powers. Maoists argued that the Soviet Union had itself become an imperialist power while maintaining a socialist façade, or social imperialism.

=== Soviet imperial ideology ===
The Soviet ideology continued the messianism of Pan-Slavism which placed Russia as a special nation. While proletarian internationalism was originally embraced by the Bolshevik Party during its seizure of power in the Russian Revolution, after the formation of the Soviet Union, Marxist proponents of internationalism suggested that the country could be used as a "homeland of communism" from which revolution could be spread around the globe. Joseph Stalin and Nikolai Bukharin encouraged this turn towards national communism in 1924, away from the classical Marxism position of global socialism. According to Alexander Wendt, this "evolved into an ideology of control rather than revolution under the rubric of socialist internationalism" within the Soviet Union.

Under Leonid Brezhnev, the policy of "Developed Socialism" declared the Soviet Union to be the most complete socialist country—other countries were "socialist", but the USSR was "developed socialist"—explaining its dominant role and hegemony over the other socialist countries. Brezhnev also formulated and implemented the interventionist Brezhnev doctrine, permitting the invasion of other socialist countries, which was characterised as imperial. Alongside this Brezhnev also implemented a policy of cultural Russification as part of Developed Socialism, which sought to assert more central control. This was a dimension of Soviet cultural imperialism, which involved the Sovietization of culture and education at the expense of local traditions.

=== Central Asia ===
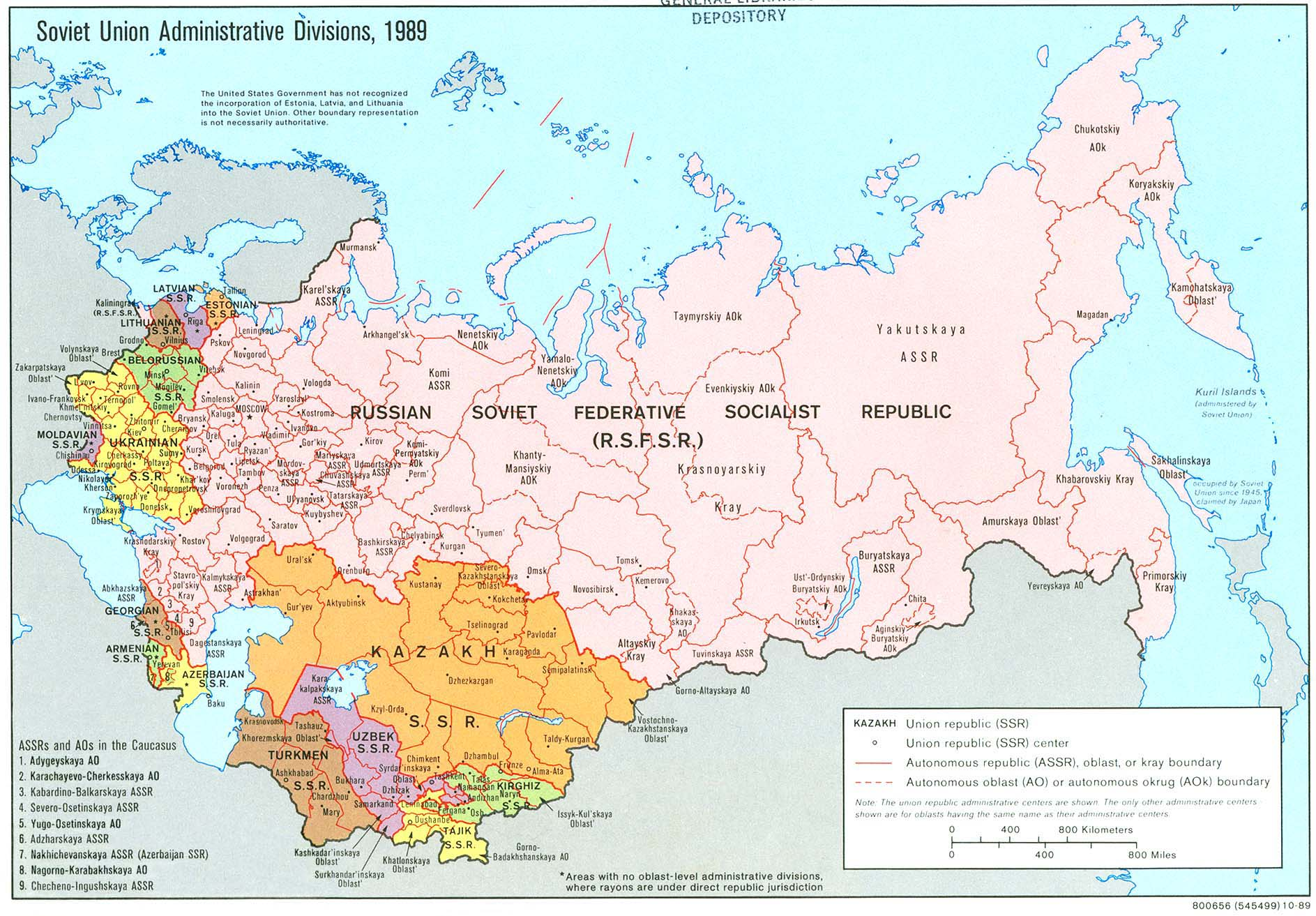
Republics of the Soviet Union, 1989

The Soviets pursued internal colonialism in Central Asia. From the 1930s through the 1950s, Joseph Stalin ordered population transfers in the Soviet Union, deporting people (often entire nationalities) to underpopulated remote areas. Transfers from the Caucasus to Central Asia included the Deportation of the Balkars, Deportation of the Chechens and Ingush, Deportation of the Crimean Tatars, the Deportation of the Karachays, and the Deportation of the Meskhetian Turks. Many European Soviet citizens and much of Russia's industry were relocated to Kazakhstan during World War II, when Nazi armies threatened to capture all the European industrial centers of the Soviet Union. These migrants founded mining towns which quickly grew to become major industrial centers such as Karaganda (1934), Zhezkazgan (1938), Temirtau (1945) and Ekibastuz (1948). In 1955, the town of Baikonur was built to support the Baikonur Cosmodrome. Many more Russians arrived in the years 1953–1965, during the so-called Virgin Lands Campaign of Soviet general secretary Nikita Khrushchev. Still more settlers came in the late 1960s and 70s, when the government paid bonuses to workers participating in a program to relocate Soviet industry close to the extensive coal, gas, and oil deposits of Central Asia. By 1979 ethnic Russians in Kazakhstan numbered about 5,500,000, almost 40% of the total population.

=== Soviet expansionism ===
Despite early support for self-determination, the Bolsheviks reconquered most of the Russian Empire during the Russian Civil War. The early Russian Soviet Federative Socialist Republic annexed by force the following states:

- Crimea, 1918
- Turkestan, 1918
- Yakutia, 1918
- Belarus, 1919
- Alash Autonomy, 1920
- Armenia, 1920
- Azerbaijan, 1920
- Emirate of Bukhara, 1920
- Khanate of Khiva, 1920
- North Caucasian Emirate, 1920
- North Ingria, 1920
- Buryatia, 1921
- Georgia, 1921
- Mountainous Republic of the Northern Caucasus, 1921
- Ukrainian People's Republic, 1921
- Altai, 1922
- Green Ukraine, 1922
- Karelia, 1923

From the 1919 Karakhan Manifesto to 1927, diplomats of the Soviet Union would promise to revoke concessions in China, but the Soviets kept tsarist concessions such as the Chinese Eastern Railway as part of secret negotiations 1924–1925. This played a role in leading to the 1929 Sino-Soviet conflict, which the Soviets won and reaffirmed their control over the railway, the railway was returned in 1952.

In 1939, the USSR entered into the Molotov–Ribbentrop Pact with Nazi Germany that contained a secret protocol that divided Romania, Poland, Latvia, Lithuania, Estonia and Finland into German and Soviet spheres of influence. Eastern Poland, Latvia, Estonia, Finland and Bessarabia in northern Romania were recognized as parts of the Soviet sphere of influence. Lithuania was added in a second secret protocol in September 1939.

The Soviet Union had invaded the portions of eastern Poland assigned to it by the Molotov–Ribbentrop Pact two weeks after the German invasion of western Poland, followed by co-ordination with German forces in Poland. During the Occupation of East Poland by the Soviet Union, the Soviets liquidated the Polish state, and a German-Soviet meeting addressed the future structure of the "Polish region". Soviet authorities immediately started a campaign of sovietization of the newly Soviet-annexed areas.

In 1939, the Soviet Union unsuccessfully attempted an invasion of Finland, subsequent to which the parties entered into an interim peace treaty granting the Soviet Union the eastern region of Karelia (10% of Finnish territory), and the Karelo-Finnish Soviet Socialist Republic was established by merging the ceded territories with the KASSR. After a June 1940 Soviet Ultimatum demanding Bessarabia, Northern Bukovina, and the Hertsa region from Romania, the Soviets entered these areas, Romania caved to Soviet demands and the Soviets occupied the territories.

In September and October 1939 the Soviet government compelled the much smaller Baltic states to conclude mutual assistance pacts which gave the Soviets the right to establish military bases there. Following invasion by the Red Army in the summer of 1940, Soviet authorities compelled the Baltic governments to resign. Under Soviet supervision, new puppet communist governments and fellow travelers arranged rigged elections with falsified results. Shortly thereafter, the newly elected "people's assemblies" passed resolutions requesting admission into the Soviet Union. After the invasion in 1940 the repressions followed with the mass deportations carried out by the Soviets.

Around 500,000 immigrants, mostly Russians, settled in Latvia, changing the share of Latvians from 84% in 1945 to 60% in 1953. Almost 180,000 Russians settled in Estonia, changing the share of Estonians from 94% of the Republic in 1945 to 62% in 1989. Similar colonizations occurred elsewhere. Between 1926 and 1959, the number of migrants rose from 57% to 80% in Buryatia, and from 36% to 53% in Yakutia. By 1959, Russians made up 75% of all migrants in Buryatia; 44% of migrants in Yakutia; and 76% of migrants in Khakassia.

By the end of World War II the Soviet Union had also annexed:

- Carpathian Ruthenia, formerly in Czechoslovakia and occupied in 1944
- Tuva (independent 1921–1944; previously governed by Mongolia and by the Manchu Empire (Tannu Uriankhai))
- East Prussia (now Kaliningrad Oblast) from Germany, in 1945
- The Klaipėda Region, annexed to Lithuania in 1945
- The Kuril Islands and southern Sakhalin from Japan, occupied in 1945
- Snake Island in the Black Sea and several Danubian islands from Romania, occupied in 1944 and annexed in 1948

At the end of World War II, most eastern and central European countries were occupied by the Soviet Union, known as “European colonies”, while remaining independent though their politics, military, foreign and domestic policies were dominated by the Soviet Union. Soviet satellite states in Europe included:

- (People's Socialist Republic of Albania) People's Republic of Albania (1946–1961)
- Republic of Finland (1947–1991) - Finlandization
- Czechoslovak Socialist Republic (1948–1989)
- Polish People's Republic (1947–1989)
- People's Republic of Bulgaria (1946–1990)
- (Socialist Republic of Romania) Romanian People's Republic (1947–1965; eventually achieved de-satellization)
- (East Germany) German Democratic Republic (1949–1990)
- Hungarian People's Republic (1949–1989)

The Democratic Republic of Afghanistan can also be considered a Soviet satellite; from 1978 until 1991, the central government in Kabul was aligned with the Eastern Bloc, and was directly supported by Soviet military between 1979 and 1989. The Mongolian People's Republic was also a Soviet satellite from 1924 to 1991. Other Asian Soviet satellite states included the Chinese Soviet Republic in Jiangxi province, the Tuvan People's Republic, and the East Turkestan Republic.

== Contemporary Russian imperialism ==
Russian-occupied and Russian-claimed territories in Europe as of 2023

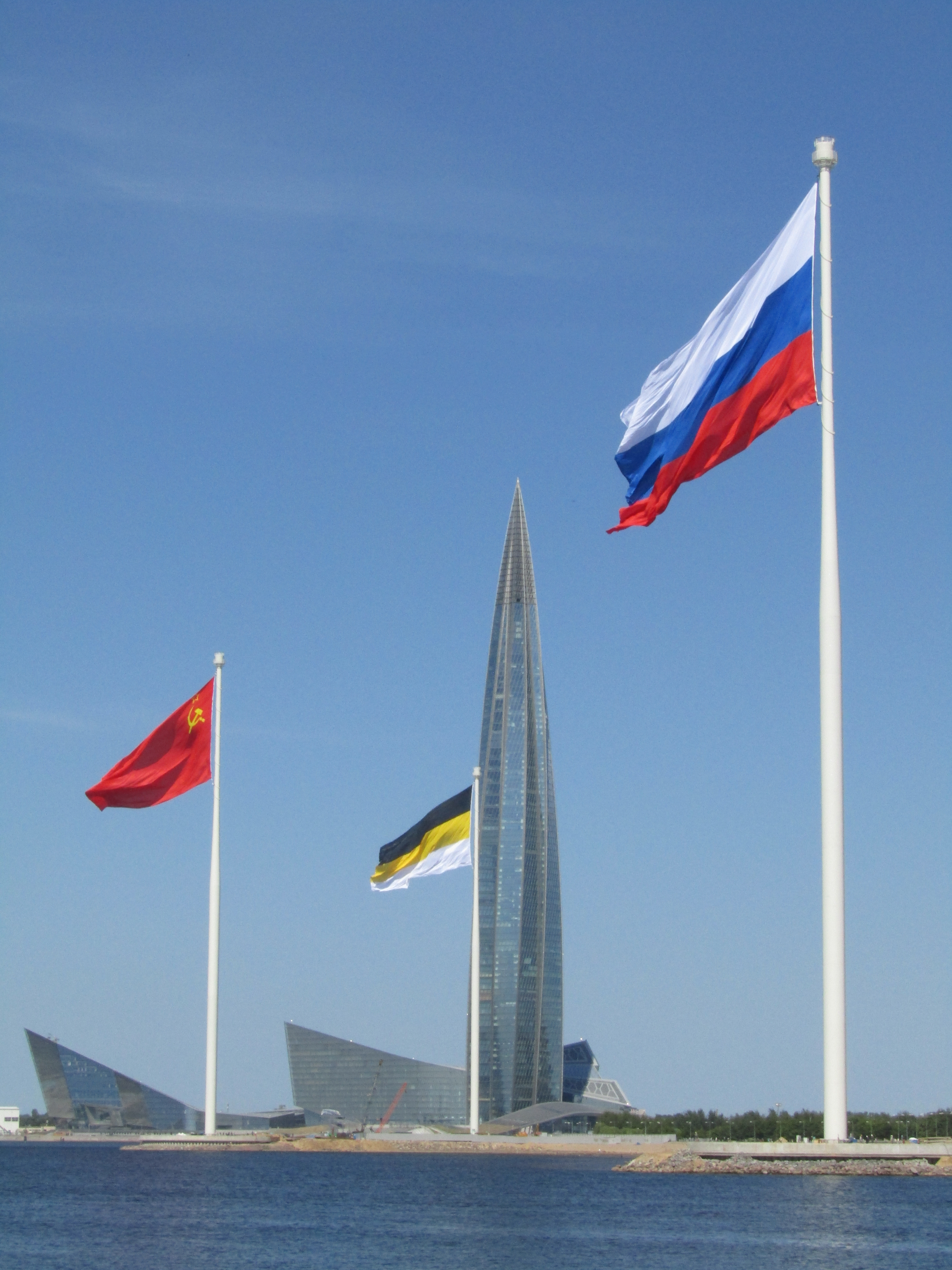
The flag of the Russian Empire (middle), flying alongside the current flag of Russia (right) and the flag of the Soviet Union (left) in front of Gazprom's Lakhta Centre outside St Petersburg, 2023

After the dissolution of the Soviet Union in 1991, it was thought that the Russian Federation had given up on plans of territorial expansion or kin-state nationalism, despite some 25 million ethnic Russians living in neighboring countries outside Russia. Stephen M. Saideman and R. William Ayres assert that Russia followed a non-irredentist policy in the 1990s despite some justifications for irredentist policies—one factor disfavoring irredentism was a focus by the ruling interest in consolidating power and the economy within the territory of Russia. Furthermore, a stable policy of irredentism popular with the electorate was not found, and politicians proposing such ideas did not fare well electorally. Russian nationalist politicians tended to focus on internal threats (i.e. "outsiders") rather than on the interests of Russians outside the federation.

Analysts have described Russia's state ideology under Vladimir Putin as nationalist and imperialist. Since his third term as president, some analysts argue that Putin and his inner circle are working to re-establish a Russian empire. Andrey Kolesnikov describes Putin's regime as melding nationalist imperialism with conservative Orthodoxy and aspects of Stalinism. Putin has portrayed the Soviet Union as carrying out Russia's "imperial destiny" under another name.

The Russian Federation is the primary recognized successor state to the Soviet Union and it has been accused of trying to bring post-Soviet states back under its control. Since the dissolution of the Soviet Union, Russia has occupied parts of neighboring states. These occupied territories are Transnistria (part of Moldova); Abkhazia and South Ossetia (part of Georgia); and large parts of Ukraine, which it has illegally annexed. The four southernmost Kuril Islands are considered by Japan and several other countries to be occupied by Russia as well. Russia has also established effective political domination over Belarus, through the Union State. Marcel Van Herpen has described the Russian-led Eurasian Economic Union and Eurasian Customs Union as further empire-building projects.

In 2024, the Parliamentary Assembly of the Organization for Security and Co-operation in Europe (OSCE) issued a statement saying that it:

"Deplores the violently imperial and colonial nature of the Russian Federation, which is on clear display in its genocidal war against Ukraine, its soft annexation of Belarus and its aggression against the Republic of Moldova, as well as in its attacks on the sovereignty and democratic choice made by the Georgian and Armenian peoples".

In the political language of Russia, the post-Soviet republics are referred to as the "near abroad". Increasing usage of the term is linked to assertions of Russia's right to maintain significant influence in the region. Putin has declared the region to be part of Russia's "sphere of influence", and strategically vital to Russian interests. The concept has been compared to the Monroe Doctrine.

A 2012 survey by the Pew Research Center found that 44% of Russians agreed that "it is natural for Russia to have an empire", while a 2015 survey found that "61 percent of Russians believe parts of neighboring countries really belong to Russia".

Russian officials and media have denied aggressive or expansionist designs. In a December 2025 speech to military commanders, Pres. Putin maintained that fear of Russia is "hysteria" stoked by European leaders. However, in a subsequent secret briefing to the commanders, (according to "officials from two countries with knowledge of the episode"), he reportedly told them that "their goal" for 2026 was “the collapse of NATO and the E.U. from within".

=== 'Russian World' ===
Since the 2000s the Russian government has promoted the idea of the "Russian World" (Russian: Русский мир, romanized: Russkiy Mir); generally defined as the community of ethnic Russians and Russian speakers who identify with Eastern Orthodoxy and who purportedly hold similar values. Putin established the Kremlin-funded Russkiy Mir Foundation in 2007, to foster the "Russian World" concept abroad. Jeffrey Mankoff says that the "Russian World" embodies "the idea of a Russian imperial nation transcending the Russian Federation's borders" and challenges "neighboring states' efforts to construct their own civic nations and disentangle their histories from Russia". It has been endorsed by the Russian Orthodox Church under the leadership of Patriarch Kirill of Moscow, who said "the civilization of Russia belongs to something broader than the Russian Federation. This civilization we call the Russian world". Patriarch Kirill's 2009 tour of Ukraine was described by Oleh Medvedev, adviser to Ukraine's prime minister, as "a visit of an imperialist who preached the neo-imperialist Russian World doctrine".

Linked to the "Russian World" idea is the concept of "Russian compatriots"; a term by which the Kremlin refers to the Russian diaspora and Russian-speakers in other countries. In her book Beyond Crimea: The New Russian Empire (2016), Agnia Grigas highlights how "Russian compatriots" have become an "instrument of Russian neo-imperial aims". The Kremlin has sought influence over them by offering them Russian citizenship and passports (passportization), and in some cases eventually calling for their military protection. Grigas writes that the Kremlin uses the existence of these "compatriots" to "gain influence over and challenge the sovereignty of foreign states and at times even take over territories". This has been demonstrated in Ukraine, Georgia and Moldova. Then-President Dmitry Medvedev justified the 2008 invasion of Georgia as defending "compatriots" in the breakaway regions of Abkhazia and South Ossetia. The issue of "Russian compatriots" has also raised tensions in Moldova's Gagauzia, Estonia's Ida-Viru county, Latvia's Latgale region, northern Kazakhstan, and elsewhere. Many countries resist the use of this term, as do many of the people to whom the Kremlin applies it.

=== Crimea, Donbas, Ukraine ===
==== Crimea annexation ====
During the 2014 Ukrainian revolution, Russia took control of and then annexed Crimea from Ukraine, following a referendum held under occupation. Analyst Vladimir Socor described Putin's speech marking the annexation as a "manifesto of Greater-Russia irredentism". Putin harked back to the "Russian soldiers whose bravery brought Crimea into the Russian Empire". He said that the dissolution of the Soviet Union had "robbed" Russia of territories and made Russians "the biggest ethnic group in the world to be divided by borders", calling this an "outrageous historical injustice". In Socor's view, Putin's speech thus "implies that reclaiming Crimea is only a first step in a grander design". Peter Dickinson of the Atlantic Council considers the annexation to mark the start of a "campaign of imperial conquest" by Putin.

Russia has been accused of neo-colonialism in Crimea by enforced Russification, discrimination, and by settling Russian citizens on the peninsula and forcing out Ukrainians and Crimean Tatars, which has been described as colonization.

==== Donbas War and 'New Russia' (2014–2021) ====
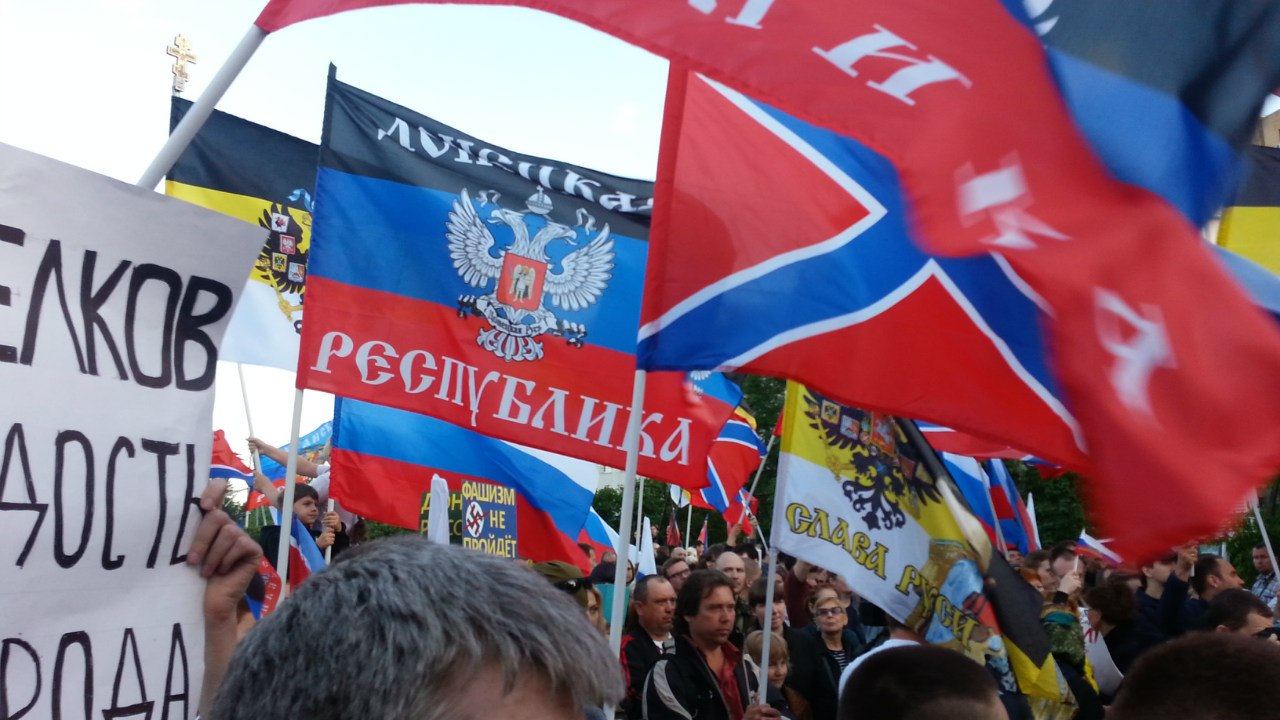
A 2014 rally in support of re-creating "Novorossiya" (New Russia), a former imperial territory in Ukraine. Shown are the black-yellow-white flag of the Russian Empire and flags of Russian separatist forces in Ukraine.

Ukrainian regions wholly or largely claimed by Russia since 2014 (Crimea) and 2022 (Donetsk, Luhansk, Kherson, and Zaporizhzhia oblasts)

"Russia's border doesn't end anywhere".

— Vladimir Putin, 24 November 2016

It has been proposed that the annexation of Crimea in 2014 proves Russia remains an expansionist state. Vladimir Putin's speech on the Crimea annexation was described by analyst Vladimir Socor as a "manifesto of Greater-Russia irredentism". Putin said that the dissolution of the Soviet Union had "robbed" Russia of territories and made Russians "the biggest ethnic group in the world to be divided by borders", calling this an "outrageous historical injustice". After the annexation, the Transnistrian authorities requested Russia annex Transnistria.

During and following the Crimea annexation, pro-Russian unrest erupted in parts of southeastern Ukraine. In April 2014, armed Russian-backed separatists seized towns in the eastern Donbas region, sparking the Donbas War with Ukraine. That month, Putin began referring to "Novorossiya" (New Russia), a former Russian imperial territory that covered much of southern Ukraine. Michael Kimmage writes that this "implied an imperial program on Russia's part". The Russian separatists declared their captured territories to be the Donetsk and Luhansk "people's republics". Russian imperial nationalism and Orthodox fundamentalism shaped the official ideology of these breakaway states, and they announced plans for a new Novorossiya, to incorporate all of eastern and southern Ukraine. The far-right Russian Imperial Movement trained and recruited thousands of volunteers to join the separatists through its 'Russian Imperial Legion'.

Following the Crimea annexation, armed Russian-backed separatists seized towns in the eastern Donbas region of Ukraine, sparking the Donbas War. They declared their captured territory to be the Donetsk and Luhansk "people's republics". During this unrest, Putin began referring to "Novorossiya" (New Russia), a former Russian imperial territory that covered much of southern Ukraine. Russian-backed forces then announced plans for a new Novorossiya, to incorporate all of eastern and southern Ukraine.

A 2015 survey by the Pew Research Center found that "61 percent of Russians believe parts of neighboring countries really belong to Russia".

In his 2021 essay "On the Historical Unity of Russians and Ukrainians", Putin referred to Russians, Ukrainians and Belarusians as "one people" making up a triune Russian nation. He maintained that large parts of Ukraine are historical Russian lands and claimed there is "no historical basis" for the "idea of Ukrainian people as a nation separate from the Russians". Björn Alexander Düben, professor of international affairs, writes that Putin is "embracing a neo-imperialist account that exalts Russia's centuries-long repressive rule over Ukraine, while simultaneously presenting Russia as a victim".

On 21 February 2022, the Kremlin recognized the Russian-controlled territories of Ukraine as independent states—the Donetsk and Luhansk "people's republics"—as well as their irredentist claims to the wider Donbas region of Ukraine. The following day, Russia announced that it was sending troops into these territories.

==== Invasion of Ukraine (since 2022) ====
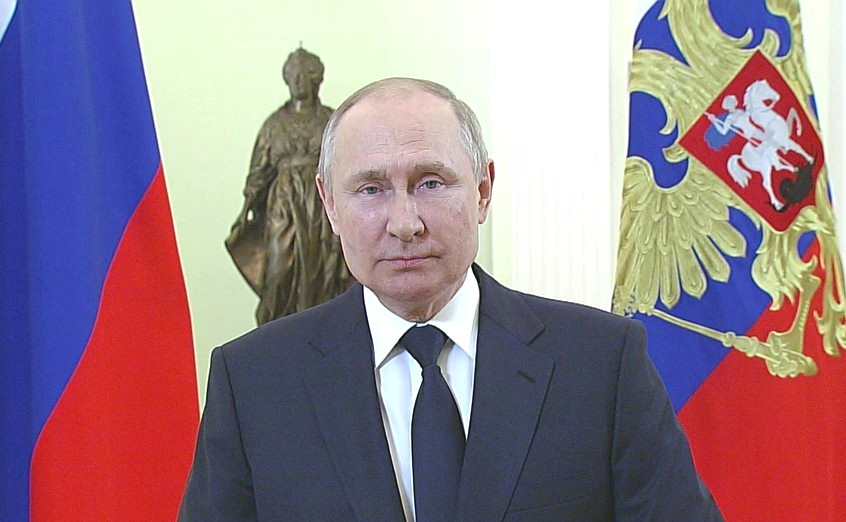
Current Russia's president Vladimir Putin has compared himself to Peter the Great in an effort to "regain the former Russian lands".

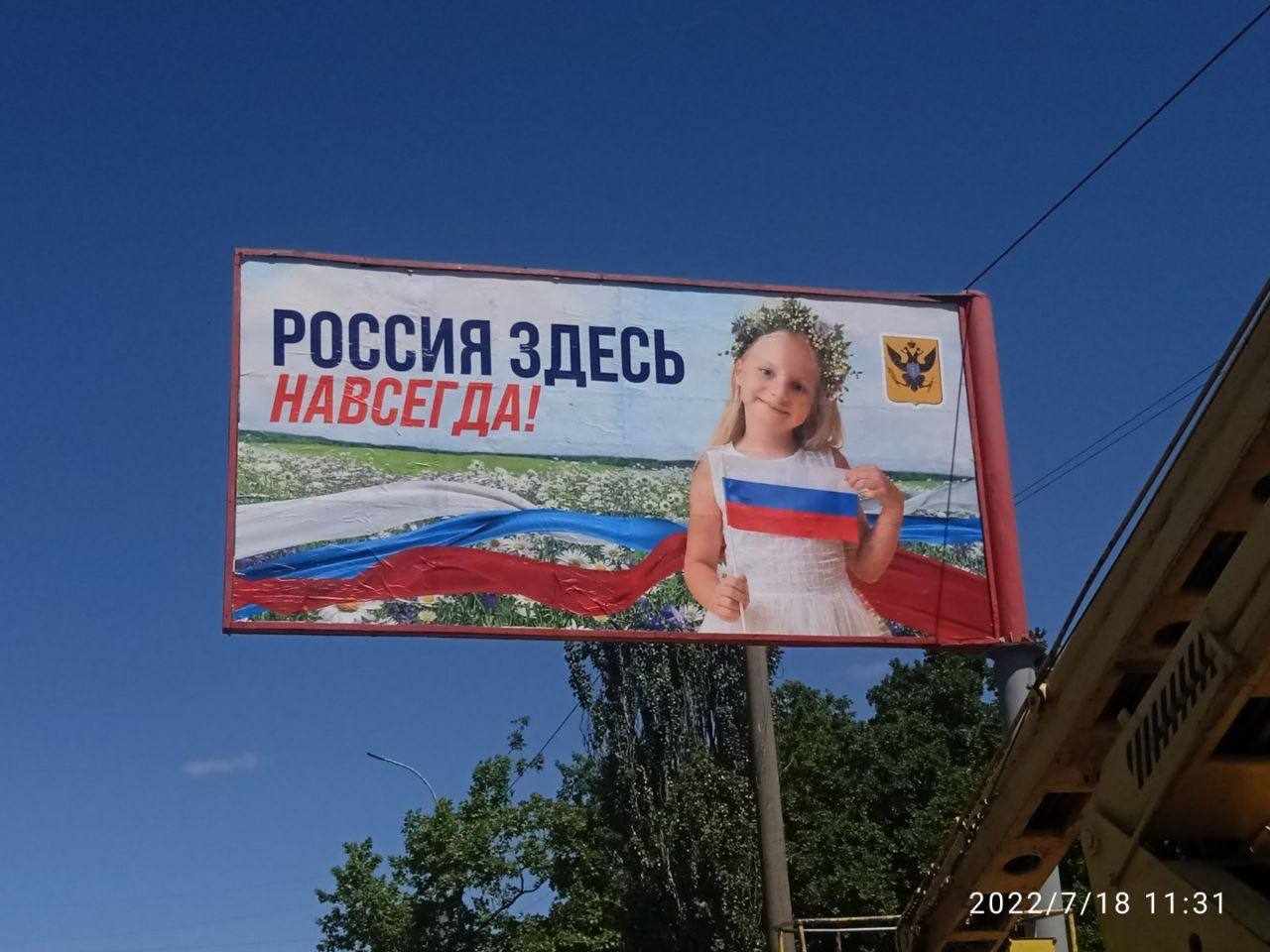
A Russian propaganda poster in occupied Kherson in 2022 declaring "Russia is here forever!". Russian Armed Forces retreated from the city four months later.

Russia launched a full invasion of Ukraine in February 2022. In announcing the invasion, Putin espoused an imperialist ideology; he repeatedly denied Ukraine's right to exist, calling the country "an inalienable part of our own history, culture and spiritual space", and claiming that it was created by Russia. It has been referred to as an irredentist war, going against the norm since World War II that sees territorial conquest as unacceptable. Parallels were made between Putin's irredentism during the Ukrainian War and Slobodan Milosevic's irredentism during the Bosnian War.

On 1 March 2022, images emerged in the press showing Belarusian President Alexander Lukashenko in front of a map which appeared to show invasion plans for Moldova where Russia already has soldiers in the breakaway region of Transnistria. South Ossetian President Anatoly Bibilov announced his intention to begin the process of annexation by the Russian Federation.

Four months into the invasion of Ukraine, Putin compared himself to Russian emperor Peter the Great. He claimed that Tsar Peter had returned "Russian land" to the empire, adding "it is now also our responsibility to return (Russian) land". Peter Dickinson of the Atlantic Council sees these comments as proof that Putin "is waging an old-fashioned imperial war of conquest".

On 8 June 2022, a draft bill was submitted to Russia's State Duma by a member of the ruling United Russia party proposing to repeal the Decree of the State Council of the Soviet Union "On the Recognition of the Independence of the Republic of Lithuania". On 6 July, the speaker of the State Duma, Vyacheslav Volodin, threatened to "claim back" Alaska if the US froze or seized Russian assets. Previously, another member of the State Duma, Oleg Matveychev, had demanded in response to sanctions that the US return Alaska, in addition to Fort Ross, California (which was historically a Russian colony). Matveychev also demanded the recognition of Antarctica as part of Russia, which in total would almost double Russia's territory.

In September 2022, referendums on joining Russia were held in four Russian-occupied regions of Ukraine: the Donetsk People's Republic, the Luhansk People's Republic, Zaporizhzhia region and Kherson region. The Russian occupation authorities announced that all regions had overwhelmingly voted in favor of joining Russia and that there had been a high turnout despite the ongoing war and depopulation. It was widely dismissed as a sham referendum by Ukraine and many other countries. On 30 September, Putin announced in a speech that Russia had annexed the four regions. The annexations were declared illegal by the UN. On 12 October 2022, the United Nations General Assembly passed Resolution ES-11/4 advocating for territorial integrity of Ukraine, with 143 nations voting in favor, 5 against and 35 abstaining. It condemned the "illegal so-called referendums" and the "attempted illegal annexation" and demanded that Russia immediately reverse its decisions and withdraw its forces from Ukraine.

Dmitry Medvedev, deputy chairman of the Security Council of Russia and former Russian president, said that Ukraine should not exist in any form and that Russia will continue to wage war against any independent Ukrainian state. He commented that Putin outlined "why Ukraine did not exist, does not exist, and will not exist". In a March 2024 speech, Medvedev described Ukraine as part of Russia, and spoke in front of a large map showing Russia in control of most of the country, with western Ukraine partitioned between other countries, and Ukraine confined to a rump state consisting of the city of Kyiv and the Kyiv Oblast.

Jeffrey Mankoff of the Institute for National Strategic Studies called the invasion "the 21st century's first imperial war" and said it "reflects the desire of many in the Russian elite to reestablish an imperial Russia". It has been referred to as an irredentist war, going against the norm since World War II that sees territorial conquest as unacceptable. Four months into the invasion, Putin compared himself to Russian emperor Peter the Great. He said that Tsar Peter had returned "Russian land" to the empire, and that "it is now also our responsibility to return (Russian) land". Peter Dickinson of the Atlantic Council sees these comments as proof that Putin "is waging an old-fashioned imperial war of conquest".

In Imperialism, supremacy, and the Russian invasion of Ukraine (2023), Kseniya Oksamytna wrote that "Imperialism is not just a land grab or subversion of another country's independence: it is an exercise of supremacy". She noted that Russia's invasion of Ukraine was accompanied by discourses of Russian "supremacy" and Ukrainian "inferiority". Russian media portrayed Ukraine as weak, divided, illegitimate, and needing to be "saved" by Russia. Oksamytna says that this likely fuelled war crimes against Ukrainians and that "the behavior of Russian forces bore all hallmarks of imperial violence, including sexual abuse, the looting of cultural artifacts, dispossession, ethnic cleansing, and forced recruitment of people on occupied territories into the imperial army". Likewise, Orlando Figes defines the invasion as "imperial expansionism" and writes that the Russians' sense of superiority may help to explain its brutality: "The Russian killings of civilians, their rapes of women, and other acts of terror are driven by a post-imperial urge to take revenge and punish them, to make them pay for their independence from Russia, for their determination to be part of Europe, to be Ukrainians, and not subjects of the 'Russian world'".

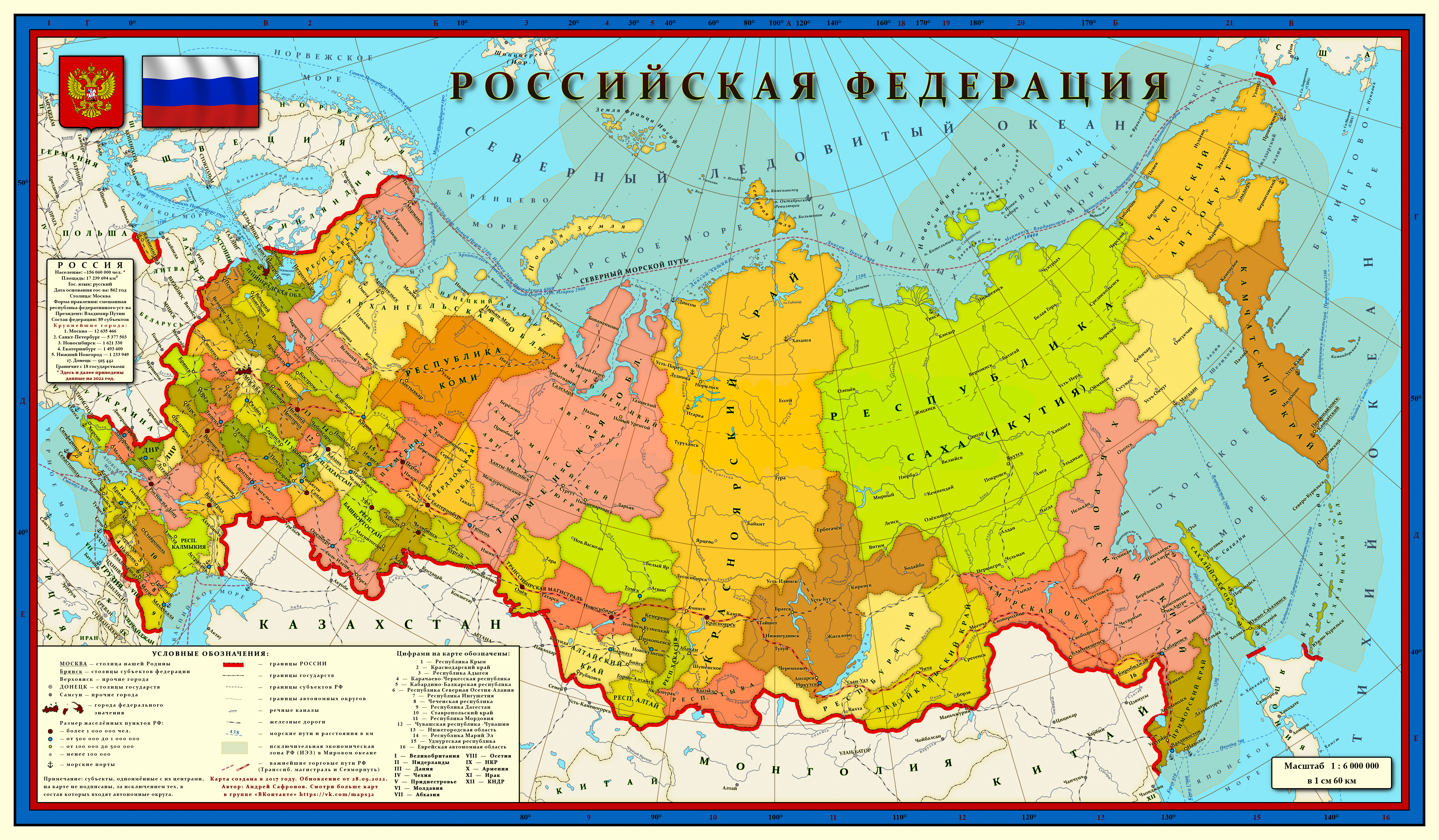
Russian map of the Federal subjects of Russia from 2023 with internationally unrecognized borders after the Russian annexation of southeastern Ukraine

In September 2022, Russian occupation authorities held annexation referendums in occupied provinces of Ukraine, despite the ongoing war and depopulation. Russian authorities said the results were overwhelmingly in favor of joining Russia. Putin then signed what he called "accession treaties" proclaiming the Russian annexation of Donetsk, Kherson, Luhansk and Zaporizhzhia oblasts on 30 September. The referendums, as well as the annexation, were condemned as illegitimate by the international community.

There are claims that Russia's indigenous ethnic minorities are being used as "cannon fodder" in Ukraine, and they have been disproportionately impacted by the army's mobilization drive. Aliide Naylor, of the Center for European Policy Analysis, said "The greatest burden of Russia's imperial war of expansion has overwhelmingly fallen on the captive peoples of the Russian Federation ... with wealthier [ethnic] Russians from western urban centers such as Moscow being less heavily impacted". Russian journalist Alexey Kovalev wrote that Russia's army "is in many ways an imperial one: Members of ethnic minorities subjugated by the expanding Russian Empire centuries ago appear to be disproportionately fighting and dying" in Ukraine. The most over-represented groups are the Bashkirs, Buryats, Tuvans, Kazakhs and Dagestani Muslims. Aram Terzyan of the Center for East European and Russian Studies wrote:

"The war in Ukraine has laid bare this imperial dynamic. The disproportionate conscription of men from minority areas and the simultaneous suppression of their cultural institutions reflect a longstanding mentality of domination and extraction."

Putin said in June 2023 that Russian soldiers killed in the invasion of Ukraine "gave their lives to Novorossiya [New Russia] and for the unity of the Russian world".

In June 2025, Putin told the St Petersburg International Economic Forum that Russians and Ukrainians are "one people" and therefore, "all of Ukraine is ours". He added "There is an old rule: Where a Russian soldier sets foot, that is ours". An audience of Russian politicians and business figures responded with applause.

At an annual meeting of the Russian Defense Ministry in December 2025, Putin said "If the opposing side [Ukraine] and their foreign patrons refuse to engage in substantive discussions, Russia will achieve the liberation of its historical lands by military means".

=== Other former Soviet republics ===
==== Moldova ====
In August 2026 the New York Times reported on a Russian campaign to "derail" the Western-oriented government of Moldova. According to Western intelligence officials the Times talked to, the country, though small (3 million), has an important strategically location, being squeezed between NATO members and Ukraine. As of 2026, its government, headed by President Maia Sandu, has made E.U. membership a priority, making it "a Kremlin target".

The Times reported Russia's use of not only disinformation and hacking, but vote-buying and the training of pro-Russian Moldovans to develop a corps of "disciplined shock troops" with skills in election interference, breaking through police cordons and setting buildings on fire. Orthodox Moldovan priests were paid the equivalent of hundreds of dollars to preach Russian propaganda and recruit voters. Hundreds of millions of dollars were spent on a vote buying program. As of 2026, missiles from Russia attacked energy infrastructure providing service to Moldova, causing waterway pollution and disruptions to electrical power.

The effort has allegedly gone "further than perhaps anywhere else outside Ukraine, and stands as one of the most extensive and audacious plots to date in Mr. Putin’s effort to destabilize the West, the three Western intelligence officials say". (Note: The NYT article was based on interviews "with activists who took part in the Russian effort; senior Moldovan law enforcement and security officials; and more than half a dozen European and American intelligence officials;" and also "thousands of documents related to Russia’s attempts to interfere in Moldova’s elections".)

==== Kazakhstan ====
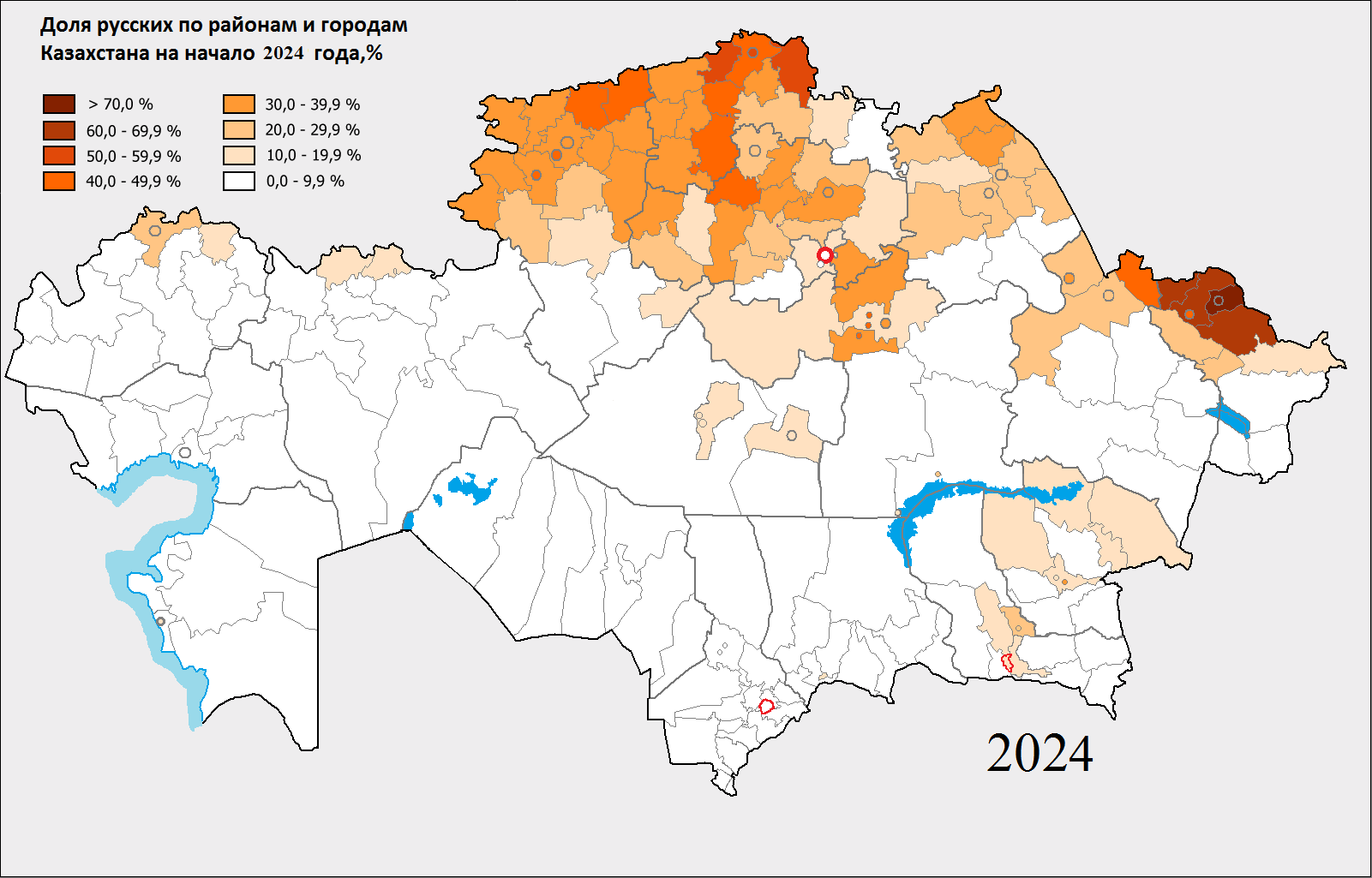
The share of Russians by districts and cities of regional and republican subordination Kazakhstan in 2024

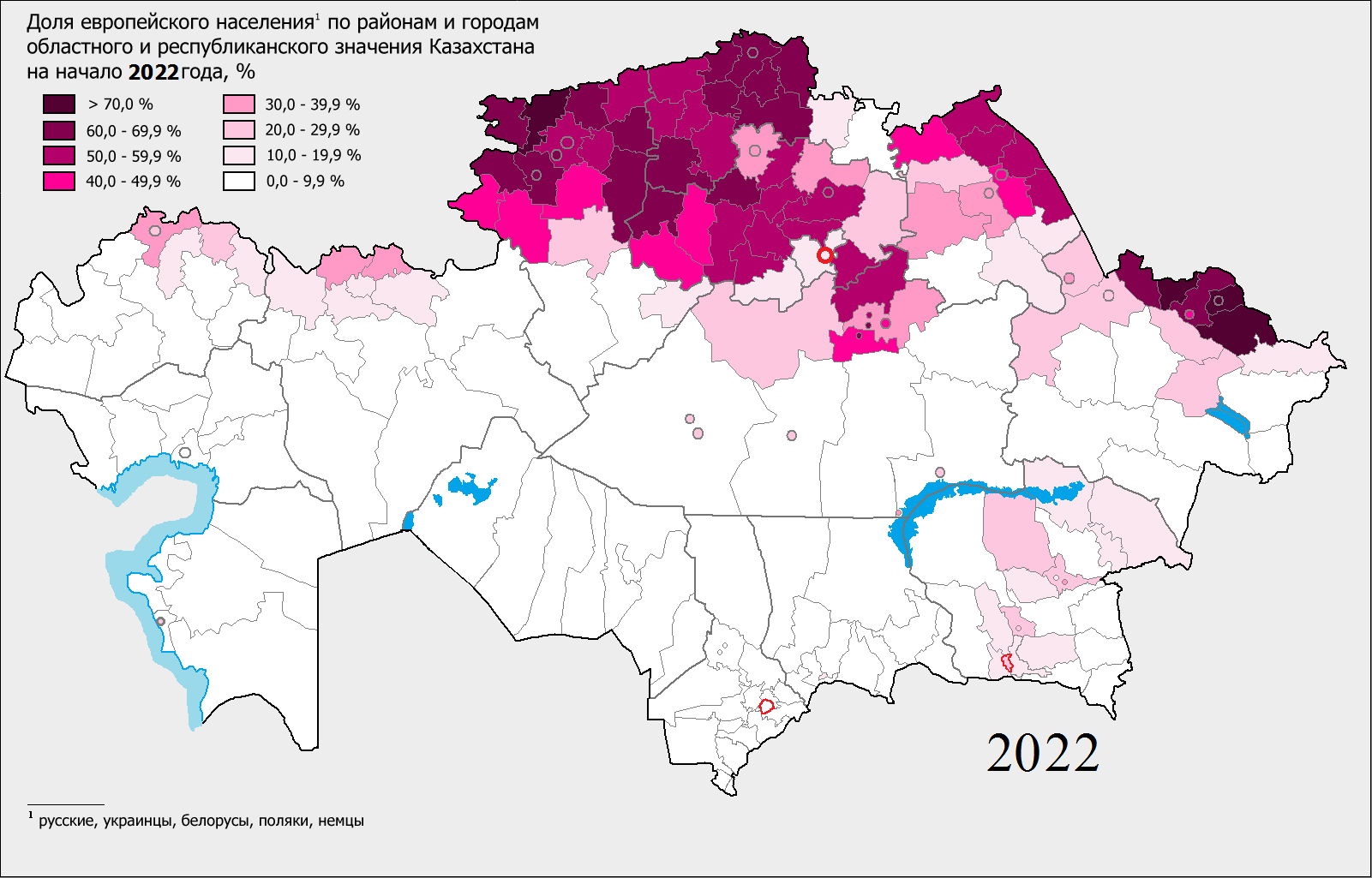
The share of the European population by districts and cities of regional and republican subordination Kazakhstan in 2016 > 70٪ 60.0 – 69.9 % 50.0 - 59.9 % 40.0 - 49.9 % 30.0 - 39.9 % 20.0 - 29.9 % 10.0 - 19.9 % 0.0 - 9.9 %

Russian President Vladimir Putin has made several public remarks questioning Kazakhstan's historical statehood, beginning with his 2014 statement that the country “never had statehood” and his 2021 description of Kazakhstan as “a Russian-speaking country in the full sense of the word." These comments have drawn concern in Kazakhstan, where northern regions have sizable ethnic Russian populations.

=== Eurasianism ===
Putin is said to be influenced by the imperialist ideology of Eurasianism. The contemporary Eurasianist ideology was shaped and promoted by political theorist Aleksandr Dugin, who espoused it in his 1997 book Foundations of Geopolitics. Political scientist Anton Shekhovtsov defines Dugin's Eurasianism as "a fascist ideology centred on the idea of revolutionising the Russian society and building a totalitarian, Russia-dominated Eurasian Empire that would challenge and eventually defeat its eternal adversary represented by the United States and its Atlanticist allies, thus bringing about a new ‘golden age’ of global political and cultural illiberalism". Russia's military and political aggression against Ukraine since 2014 has been influenced and supported by neo-Eurasianists. In 2023, Russia adopted a Eurasianist, anti-Western foreign policy in a document approved by Putin. This defines Russia as a "unique country-civilization and a vast Eurasian and Euro-Pacific power" that seeks to create a "Greater Eurasian Partnership".

=== Neo-colonialism in Africa ===
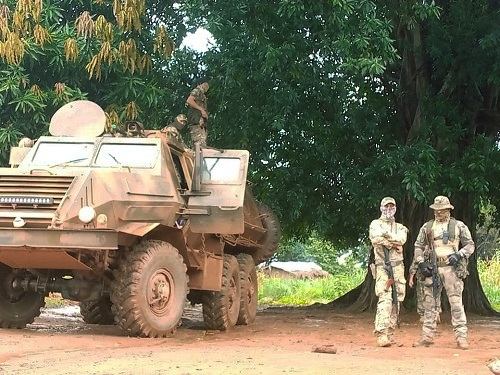
Russian mercenaries standing guard near an armored vehicle in the Central African Republic

The Wagner Group, a Russian state-funded private military company (PMC), has provided military support, security and protection for several autocratic regimes in Africa since 2017. In return, Russian and Wagner-linked companies have been given privileged access to those countries' natural resources, such as rights to gold and diamond mines, while the Russian military has been given access to strategic locations such as airbases and ports. This has been described as a neo-imperialist and neo-colonial kind of state capture, whereby Russia gains sway over countries by helping to keep the ruling regime in power and making them reliant on its protection, while generating economic and political benefits for Russia, without benefitting the local population. Russia has also gained geopolitical influence in Africa through election interference and spreading pro-Russian propaganda and anti-Western disinformation. Russian PMCs have been active in the Central African Republic, Sudan, Libya, Mali, Burkina Faso, Niger and Mozambique, among other countries. They have been accused of killing civilians and human rights abuses. In 2024, the Wagner Group in Africa was merged into a new 'Africa Corps' under the direct control of Russia's Ministry of Defense. Analysts for the Russian government have acknowledged the neo-colonial nature of Russia's policy towards Africa. Writing for The Hill, Stephen Blank argues that Russia's actions and ambitions in Africa are "the quintessence of imperialism".

== See also ==
- All-Russian nation – Imperial and modern Russian irredentist ideology
- Chechen–Russian conflict – Centuries-long theater of the Russo-Caucasian conflict
- Circassian genocide – Mass murder of Circassians by the Russian Empire
- Eurasianism – Socio-political movement in the Russian Federation
- Great Russian chauvinism – Ideology
- Greater Serbia – Serbian nationalist and irredentist concept
- Imperialism – Extension of rule over foreign nations
- Katyn massacre – Soviet massacre of Polish military officers and intelligentsia in 1940
- Military occupations by the Soviet Union – Soviet military occupations (1939-1991)
- Neo-Sovietism – Movement to revive Soviet ideologies
- Neo-Stalinism – Movement to revive Stalinist ideas and governance
- Polish Operation of the NKVD – 1937–38 Soviet ethnic cleansing of Poles
- Population transfer in the Soviet Union – Transfer and deportation of people in the Soviet Union
- Prison of the peoples – Phrase used by Vladimir Lenin to describe Russia
- Putinism – Political system in Russia under Vladimir Putin
- Ruscism – Term describing Russian political ideology
- Russian nationalism – Russian political ideology
- Russian world – Conceptual sphere of influence of Russia
- Russification – Measures to increase the influence of Russian culture and language
- Second Cold War – Term referring to heightened tensions in the 21st century
- Separatism in Russia – Political and social movements
- Soviet Empire – Term for Soviet foreign policy before 1989
- Soviet invasion of Poland – 1939 World War II invasion
- Territorial evolution of Russia
- Ultranationalism – Extreme form of nationalism
- Union State – Supranational union of Belarus and Russia
- Warsaw Pact – Eastern European military alliance (1955–1991)
- Winter War – 1939–1940 war between the Soviet Union and Finland
- Z (military symbol) – Russian military and propaganda symbol

== Sources ==
- Langley, Andrew (2006). The Collapse of the Soviet Union: The End of an Empire. Compass Point Books. ISBN 0-7565-2009-6.
- Merkl, Peter H. (2004). German Unification. Penn State Press. ISBN 0-271-02566-2.
- Nekrich, Aleksandr Moiseevich; Ulam, Adam Bruno; Freeze, Gregory L. (1997). Pariahs, Partners, Predators: German–Soviet Relations, 1922–1941. Columbia University Press. ISBN 978-0-231-10676-4.
- Rajagopal, Balakrishnan (2003). International law from below: development, social movements, and Third World resistance. Cambridge University Press. ISBN 0-521-01671-1.
- Rao, B. V. (2006). History of Modern Europe Ad 1789–2002: A.D. 1789–2002. Sterling Publishers. ISBN 1-932705-56-2.
- Roberts, Geoffrey (2006). Stalin's Wars: From World War to Cold War, 1939–1953. Yale University Press. ISBN 0-300-11204-1.
- Saideman, Stephen M.; Ayres, William R. (2008), For Kin Or Country: Xenophobia, Nationalism, and War, Columbia University Press
- Shirer, William L. (1990). The Rise and Fall of the Third Reich: A History of Nazi Germany. Simon and Schuster. ISBN 978-0-671-72868-7.
- Van Herpen, Marcel H. (2013). Putinism: The Slow Rise of a Radical Right Regime in Russia. Palgrave Macmillan. ISBN 9781137282811.
- Wettig, Gerhard (2008). Stalin and the Cold War in Europe. Rowman & Littlefield. ISBN 978-0-7425-5542-6.
