= Grigas =

Grigas is a surname. Notable people with the surname include:

- Agnia Grigas (born 1979), American political scientist and author
- Apolinaras Grigas (born 1945), Soviet rower
- John Grigas (1920–2000), American football player
- Rimantas Grigas (born 1962), Lithuanian basketball coach
- Gintautas Grigas, Lithuanian computer scientist.

== See also ==
- Griga
