= Griga =

Griga is a surname. Notable people with the surname include:

- Larisa Griga (born 1984), Ukrainian badminton player
- Stanislav Griga (born 1961), Slovak footballer and manager

== See also ==
- Griga United, Belizean football team
- Grigas
