= Indian March of Paul =

Planned Russo-French invasion of India (1801)

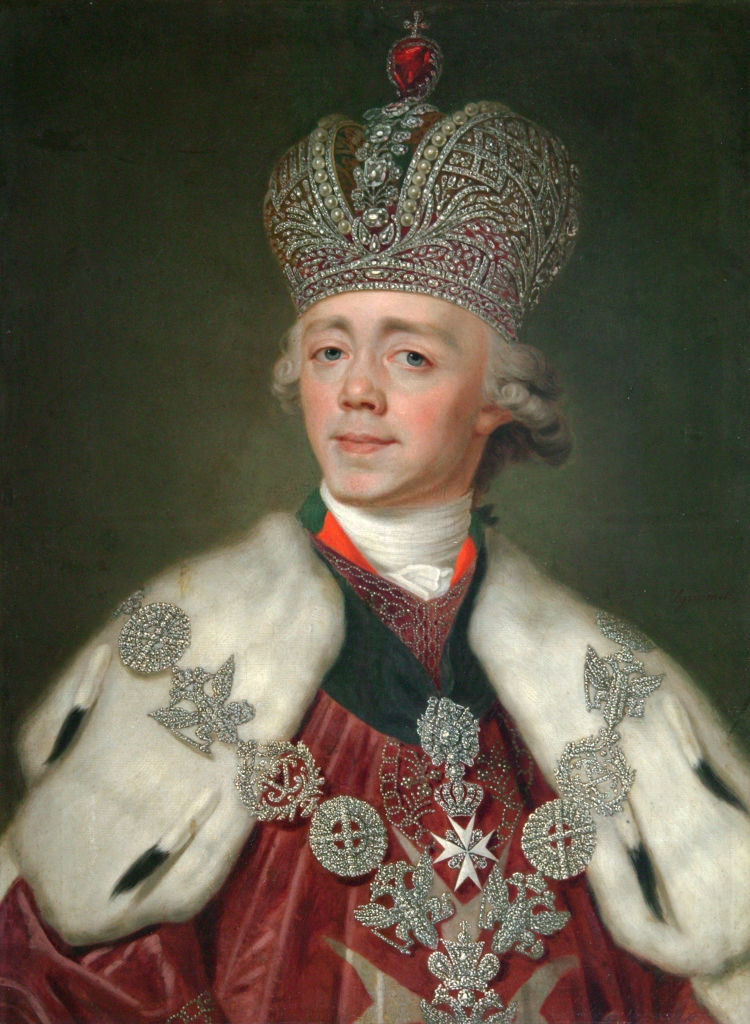
Paul I of Russia in 1800

The Indian March of Paul (Russian: Индийский поход Павла, romanized: Indiyskiy pokhod Pavla) was an ultimately unrealized plan by the Russian Empire and French First Republic to invade the British East India Company's possessions in India. It was abandoned following the assassination of Paul I of Russia in March 1801.

Though Russia and Great Britain were allied during the War of the First Coalition, the simultaneous failures of the Anglo-Russian invasion of Holland and Italian and Swiss expedition in 1799 precipitated a change in Russia's attitudes towards the British. Paul I, in his self-declared role as Grand Master of the Knights Hospitaller, was also angered when Britain rejected his demands to cede control over Malta to Russia in October 1800. He hastily broke with Britain and allied himself with the French, who came up with a plan for a Franco-Russian expedition against British India.

== Secret plans ==
The secret plan of the expedition, as preserved in the Russian archives, envisaged the joint operations of two infantry corps, one French (with artillery support) and one Russian. Each infantry corps had 35,000 men, the total force thus containing 70,000 men, plus artillery and a large contingent of Cossack cavalry.

Napoleon insisted that the command of the French corps be entrusted to General André Masséna. The route of advance schedule for the French corps started in May 1801 via the Danube and the Black Sea through southern Russia via Taganrog, Tsaritsyn, and Astrakhan.

At the Volga estuary, the French were intended to be joined by Russian forces. Then the joint Franco-Russian corps was to cross the Caspian Sea and land at the Iranian port of Astrabad. The whole trip from France to Astrabad was calculated to take eighty days. Further advance would take another fifty days via Herat and Kandahar before reaching the main areas of India in September of the same year.

The Indian March was designed to mimic the failed French invasion of Egypt and Syria, with engineers, painters and scientists taking part. Also meticulously devised was the public relations side of the Indian expedition. For example, the instructions for trade with the local peoples included the recommendation to sell the cloths "of the colorings most liked by the Asians". The expeditionary force was to have in stock a reserve of fireworks for festive illuminations.

== Outcome ==
In January 1801, the Don Cossack ataman Vasily Petrovich Orlov received orders for his cavalry force to march toward India. The schedule was for him to reach the steppe fort of Orenburg in a month, and from there to move via Bukhara and Khiva to the Indus River. Soon after receiving these orders, the 20,000-strong Cossack force started for the Kazakh steppes.

In his book about the Great Game, Peter Hopkirk narrates that Paul had not been able to obtain a detailed map of India until the Cossacks' departure from Orenburg. He quotes the Tsar as instructing Orlov: "My maps only go as far as Khiva and the River Oxus. Beyond these points it is your affair to gain information about the possessions of the English, and the condition of the native population subject to their rule."

When Orlov's modest Cossack contingent had advanced as far south as the Aral Sea, they received news of the emperor's assassination. The Indian March was brought to a halt, and before long the Cossacks were commanded to retreat. It is conjectured, without evidence, that the Pahlen plot to assassinate the emperor was triggered by the Indian adventure, given that the high-placed Russian officials did not approve of it, and their conspiracy was supported by British diplomats in Russia.

Both nations would fought a largely undeclared war in 1807. This resulted in limited direct engagements, yet it led to significant diplomatic and economic consequences later, particularly with the Continental System employed by Napoleon.

== Assessment ==
The British public learned about the incident years later, but it firmly imprinted on the popular consciousness, contributing to feelings of mutual suspicion and distrust associated with the Great Game. Hugh Seton-Watson observes that "the grotesque plan had no military significance, but at least showed its author's state of mind". This assessment is echoed by Hopkirk who remarks that "no serious thought or study has been given to this wild adventure".

== See also ==
- Duhamel plan (1854)
- Khrulev plan (1855)

== Literature ==
- Schroeder, Paul W. (1987). "The Collapse of the Second Coalition". Journal of Modern History. 59 (2). The University of Chicago Press: 244–290. doi:10.1086/243185. JSTOR 1879727. S2CID 144734206.
