= Flashman at the Charge =

1973 novel by George MacDonald Fraser

- First edition
- Author: George MacDonald Fraser
- Cover artist: Arthur Barbosa
- Language: English
- Genre: Historical fiction
- Publisher: Barrie & Jenkins
- Publication date: 1973
- Publication place: United Kingdom
- Media type: Print (Hardback & Paperback)
- Pages: 286
- ISBN: 978-0-214-66841-8
- OCLC: 803480
- Dewey Decimal: 823/.9/14
- LC Class: PZ4.F8418 Fm PR6056.R287
- Preceded by: Flash for Freedom!
- Followed by: Flashman in the Great Game

Flashman at the Charge is a 1973 novel by George MacDonald Fraser. It is the fourth of the Flashman novels. Playboy magazine serialised Flashman at the Charge in 1973 in their April, May and June issues. The serialisation is unabridged, including most of the notes and appendixes, and features a few illustrations, collages from various paintings and pictures to depict a period montage of the Charge and Crimea.

While George MacDonald Fraser claimed he never had a favourite among the Flashman novels, he said his agent, George Greenfield, thought this was the best.

== Plot introduction ==
Presented within the frame of the supposedly discovered historical Flashman Papers, this book describes the bully Flashman from Tom Brown's School Days. The papers are attributed to Flashman, who is not only the bully featured in Thomas Hughes's novel, but also a well-known Victorian military hero. The book begins with an explanatory note detailing the discovery of these papers.

Flashman at the Charge begins with Flashman trying to avoid a transfer to the Crimea but failing miserably. He is made guardian of one of Queen Victoria's cousins and is sent to the midst of the Crimean War. Flashman witnesses and participates in the most notable offensive and defensive actions of that war, and eventually finds himself trekking across Asia in an effort to save the British Raj. Flashman at the Charge covers the years 1854 to 1855. It also contains a number of notes by Fraser, in the guise of editor, giving additional historical information on the events described.

== Plot summary ==
Flashman meets Queen Victoria's cousin, William of Celle, incognito in a billiards hall and, without knowing his true identity, befriends him, before getting him drunk and leaving him in an alley with shoe polish covering his buttocks for the police to find. However, his reputation as a valiant and down-to-earth soldier leads to Prince Albert assigning Flashman as the boy's mentor. Despite every attempt to avoid it, he finds himself in the Crimea showing William what soldiering is all about. The boy's unfortunate death does not allow Flashman to avoid involvement in the most notable actions of the Crimean War, including The Thin Red Line, the Charge of the Heavy Brigade under James Yorke Scarlett, and the Charge of the Light Brigade.

Powered by fear and flatulence, he reaches the Russian guns in front of the other surviving members of the charge and promptly surrenders. He is taken into Russia (now Ukraine) and placed in the custody of Count Pencherjevsky. Here he reunites with Scud East, his old schoolmate, and meets Nicholas Pavlovich Ignatiev, a vicious Russian Captain.

Flashman and East overhear plans by senior Russian officers to invade India and conquer the British Raj. The two men escape from the Count's estate (thanks to a peasant uprising), but Flashman is recaptured by the Russians. Ignatiev takes Flashman with him across central Asia as part of his plans to conquer India. Flashman is rescued from prison by cohorts of Yakub Beg, led by his Chinese paramour. Then the Tajik and Uzbek warriors attack the Russian fleet using Congreve rockets captured from the Russians, which only Flashman knows how to use. Prior to the battle, Flashman was unknowingly drugged with hashish and is utterly fearless as a result, for the only time in his life. The Russian ships are destroyed and Flashman then travels on to British India.

== Characters ==
=== Fictional characters ===
- Harry Flashman – The hero or anti-hero.
- Elspeth – His adoring and possibly unfaithful wife.
- Prince William of Celle – A German cousin of Queen Victoria's who is appointed to serve under Flashman in the Crimea. However, he loses his life at the Battle of the Alma, which leads to Flashman's (temporary) disgrace.
- Count Pencherjevsky – A Cossack Hetman who is now the feudal Russian lord of a large estate.
- Scud East – Character from Tom Brown's Schooldays, now a junior officer in the British army.
- Valla – The daughter of Count Pencherjevsky and Flashman's lover.
- Aunt Sara – Aunt of Valla, who teaches Flashman how to properly enjoy a Russian steam bath.
- The Silk One – (Perhaps historical) Daughter of the Chinese warlord Ko Dali and Yakub Beg's lover. She seduces Flashman and doses him with hashish in order to make him effective in the coming battle.
- Uncle Bindley – Flashman's uncle, who gives him a position at the Board of Ordinance.

=== Historical characters ===
- Prince Albert, Consort of Queen Victoria.
- Lord Raglan – Commander of the British troops in the Crimea and the man held by Flashman to be responsible for the Charge of the Light Brigade. Flashman says, "He should have been a parson, or an Oxford don, or a waiter, for he was the kindliest, soft-voiced old stick who ever spared a fellow-creature's feelings - and that was what was wrong with him ..."
- Lord Cardigan – The man in command of the Light Cavalry Brigade at the Battle of Balaclava, whom Flashman catches in the bedroom with Elspeth, and for whom Flashman has a long-standing antipathy.
- Nicholas Pavlovich Ignatiev – The main villain of the book, a ruthless and brutal Russian diplomat who takes Flashman in chains across half of Asia and introduces him to knouting.
- Lord Palmerston, British parliamentarian, prime minister from 1855
- Lord Paget, Flashman's relative who gets him a job at the Board of Ordnance.
- Fanny Duberly, Society woman and diarist, who accompanied the soldiers to the Crimea.
- George Brown – The man in command of the Light Division in Crimea. Flashman calls him an "old Scotch war horse ... and nobody's fool".
- Jacques Leroy de Saint Arnaud, French general, Commander-in-chief of French forces in the Crimea
- François Certain Canrobert, successor to Saint-Arnaud as Commander-in-chief of French forces in the Crimea
- William Howard Russell – War correspondent for The Times. Flashman says, "He was a good fellow, Billy, and we got on well, but he always had an eye cocked towards his readers, and the worse he could make out a case, the better they liked it."
- Louis Edward Nolan – Staff galloper to Airey and one of the links in the chain of events leading to the Charge of the Light Brigade and his own death. Flashman calls him a "cavalry maniac who held everyone in contempt".
- Richard Airey – Quartermaster-general to Raglan
- Lord Lucan
- George de Lacy Evans
- Sir Colin Campbell – Commander of The Thin Red Line at the Battle of Balaclava; one of the few military commanders for whom Flashman has unalloyed respect.
- James Yorke Scarlett – Commander of the Heavy Cavalry Brigade at the Battle of Balaclava.
- Tsar Nicholas I – Flashman overhears him discussing The Great Game with Ignatiev.
- Yakub Beg – A Tajik military leader who fought against the Russians. He later ruled over the city of Kashgar. Flashman describes him as "a tough customer, by the look of him; one of those genial mountain scoundrels who'll tell you merry stories while he stabs you in the guts just for the fun of hearing his knifehilt bells jingle."
- Izzet Kutebar, brigand and friend of Yakub Beg.

== See also ==
- Duhamel plan and Khrulev plan, unrealised Russian proposals to invade British India, referenced in the novel
