= Duhamel plan =

Proposed Russian invasion of India during the Crimean War

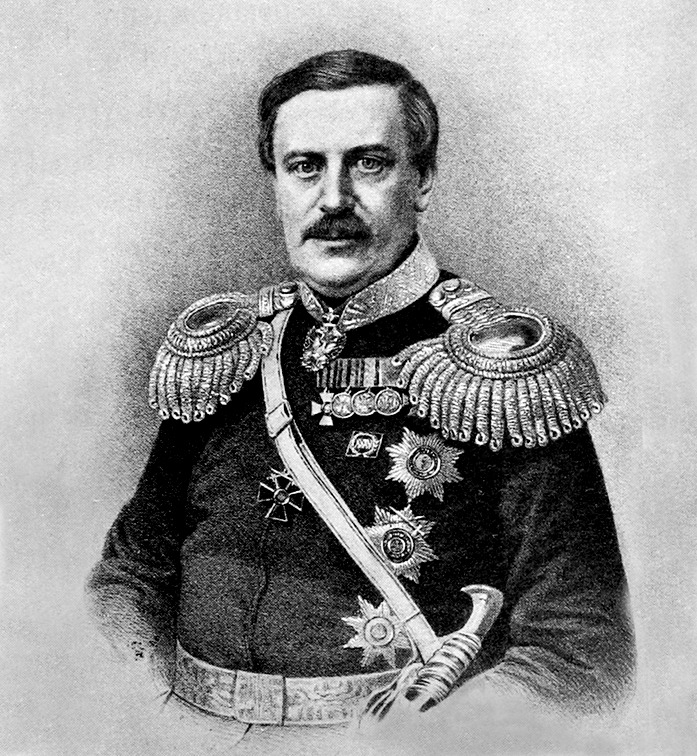
A near contemporary depiction of Duhamel

The Duhamel plan was a proposed Russian invasion of British-ruled India during the Crimean War, a war in which Russia was fighting Britain, France and the Ottoman Empire. The plan was drawn up by General Alexander Osipovich Duhamel and proposed to Tsar Nicholas I in 1854. Duhamel proposed five alternative routes but his preference was to march through Persia and Afghanistan and invade British India through the Khyber Pass. The plan would have required the support of the Afghans and Persians.

Duhamel hoped that Afghan tribesmen would join his force in the hope of winning loot and territory and that the Persians might attack the Ottomans. He also hoped that the Sikh Empire, defeated by Britain in 1849, might attack the British and that other Indians, particularly among the Muslim population, might rise in rebellion. Because of the demands of the Crimean War the invasion did not progress. The British considered that they could have defeated any potential invasion from the North-West Frontier.

== Background ==
Russian demands to exert control over some Ottoman Empire territories on its borders had led the Ottoman Empire to declare war in October 1853, beginning the Crimean War. Britain and France, wary of Russian expansion, declared war in March 1854. Allied forces would join the Ottomans at Varna, Bulgaria, in June and invade the Russian territory of Crimea in September. During this year General Alexander Osipovich Duhamel submitted a plan to Russian Tsar Nicholas I for an invasion of British India. Duhamel had been a Russian envoy to Persia between 1838 and 1841 and, in 1848, been sent by Nicholas to suppress the uprising against the Russian administration of nominally Ottoman Wallachia. Britain maintained a relatively small standing army compared to other world powers and the demands of the Crimean War even led her to deploy militia to the theatre. Duhamel considered that a Russian intervention against India would force Britain to withdraw regular units opposing Russian forces in the Near East.

== Plan ==
Duhamel's preferred route. Locations in Russian Empire in white, Persia in green, Afghanistan in black and British India in red.

In his proposal Duhamel considered that India was Britain's "only vulnerable point". He noted that in the Napoleonic era Russian Emperor Paul I had stationed a force near to Russia's southern frontier that had caused alarm in British India and that ever since British intelligence had been preoccupied by the possibility of an invasion through central Asia. Duhamel noted that the same route had been taken by Alexander the Great, Genghis Khan, Tamerlane, Babur and Nader Shah.

Duhamel considered that only a small Russian force would be required as he hoped to attract support from Afghanistan, Persia and, perhaps, the former Sikh Empire. Once the expedition reached India he hoped that the movement of British garrison troops to the north-west frontier would trigger a broad revolt against British rule. Duhamel based his expedition's route on previous Russian plans. He suggested five options to reach the Indian frontier:

- From Orenburg (Russia), via Khiva and Merv (Khanate of Khiva) and to Herat, Kandahar and Kabul (Afghanistan)
- From Orsk or Orenburg (Russia), via Bukhara (Emirate of Bukhara) to Balkh and Kabul (Afghanistan)
- From Orsk or Troitsk (Russia) with two options for the middle portion:
  - via Aralsk and Ak-Mechet/Fort Perovski (Russia) and Tashkent (Khanate of Kokand)
  - via Petropavlovsk (Kazakhstan)

Then on through Kokand (Khanate of Kokand), Kalum and Bamyan to Kabul (Afghanistan)

- An initial route with the Russian force split:
  - The infantry and artillery would travel from Astrakhan (Russia) across the Caspian Sea to Gorgan (Persia)
  - The cavalry would travel from Circassia (Russia) overland to Persia

Then the combined force taking a route via Resushan or Shahnid to Meshed (Persia) then to Herat, Kandahar and Kabul.

- From Dsuelfa [Julfa] (Russia) via Tabriz, Tehran, Meshed (Persia) to Herat, Kandahar and Kabul.

Duhamel selected the fourth route, across the Caspian, as his preferred. He considered it the least exhausting being the shortest and avoiding deserts, mountains, major river crossings and hostile tribes. Duhamel considered that the Persians were "incapable of any serious resistance" against the Russian forces and would be left no option but to allow their passage. He thought that a forward Russian base could be established in the Eastern Persian Greater Khorasan.

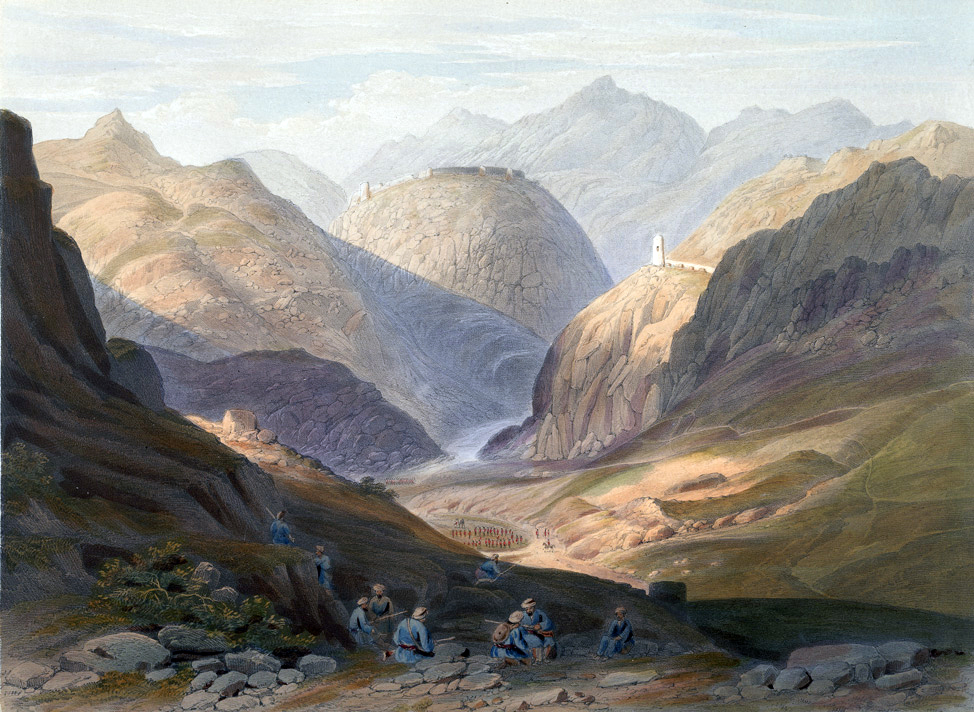
An 1848 depiction of the Khyber Pass

The onward thrust into India would be launched from Kabul or Kandahar. Duhamel preferred Kabul as it offered the quickest route, via the Khyber Pass, to the Indian cities of Lahore and Delhi, where he hoped that large numbers of rebels would rise to join his forces. It also offered the best prospects of loot and territorial gains for his Afghan allies. This march from Kabul would be made via Jalalabad (Afghanistan), through the British Indian cities of Peshawar and Attock Khurd. Duhamel had hopes that the Muslim tribal population of this region would rebel and assist the expedition. Duhamel had two alternatives for a Kandahar route: running through Quetta, Dadu and Shikarpur or via Ghazna and Dera Ismail Khan. Duhamel noted that the Kandahar route would be the same as that taken by the 1839 British invasion of Afghanistan, but in reverse. There was little detailed logistical planning. For example, he assumed that the Russian forces could consistently cover 25 versts (27 km) a day across Persia and Afghanistan.

Duhamel considered the possibility of a British counter-expedition via the Persian Gulf but considered that they were unlikely to have time to do so. He thought that the Persian shah would be unlikely to ally with Britain provided Russia guaranteed that he could retain his throne. Duhamel thought that Persia may even attack Ottoman Turkey if Russia guaranteed the restoration of Ottoman-held Baghdad, Kerseldi and part of Kurdistan in any subsequent peace treaty. Duhamel thought that Afghan support was vital to the expedition and was more important than any support from Persia or the former Sikh Empire. Duhamel considered that Persia could be won over by a mixture of "threats and intimidation, presents and pensions". The Sikhs were to be encouraged to participate by the prospect of revenge against the British for the annexation of the Punjab in 1849 after the Second Anglo-Sikh War.

Duhamel considered that Russian forces need only be relatively small: "only a small army is needed, to form the kernel of the invasion round which all the conquered tribes would cluster, and which might be gradually reduced as a general rising caused the attacking forces to swell". He also noted that "we do not invade India with a view to making conquests, but to overthrow the English rulers - or at least to weaken English power".

== Impact ==
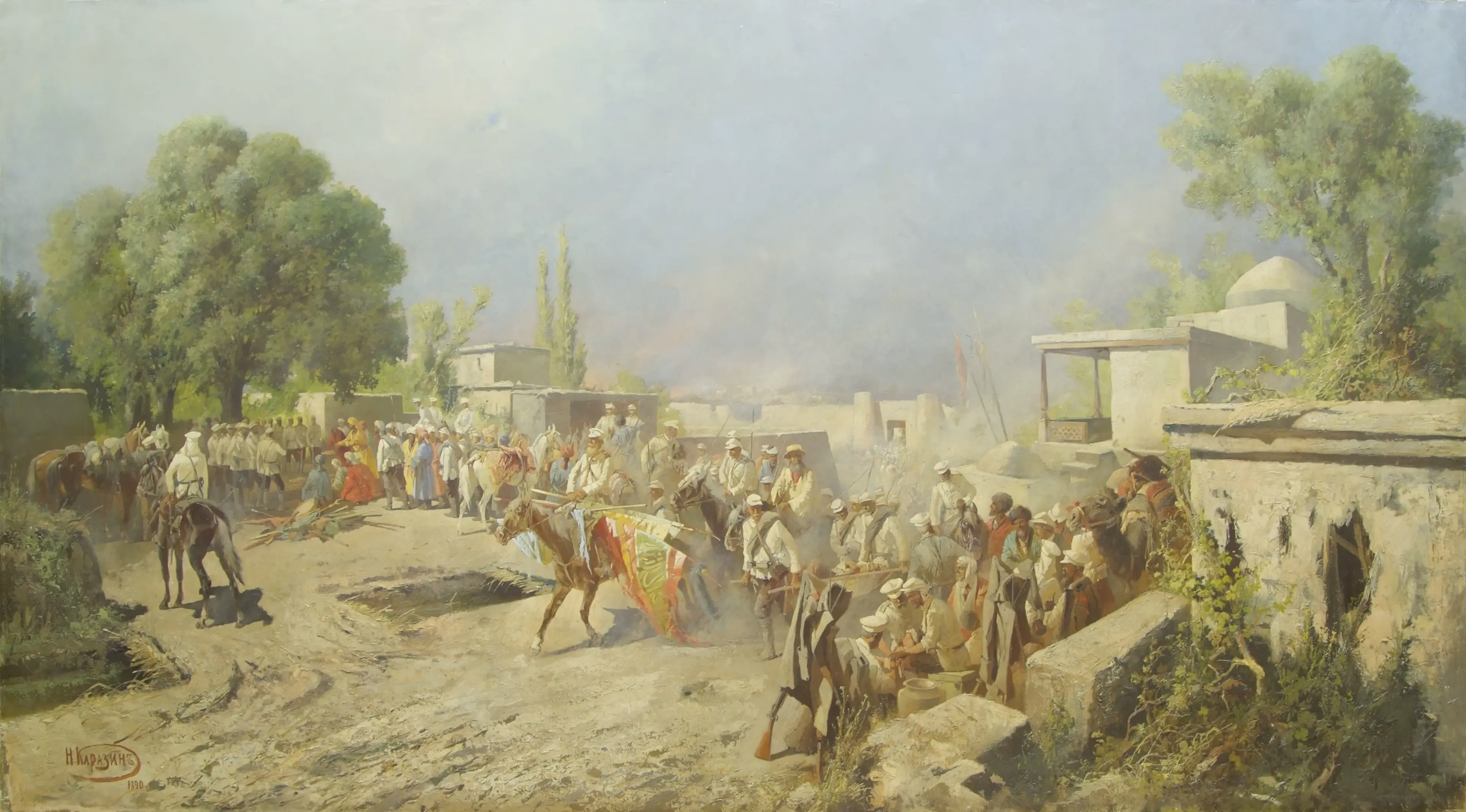
Russian troops occupying Tashkent, Kokand in 1865

Due to the demands of the war, no Russian troops could be spared for the operation and it was not carried out. A second invasion plan was proposed in 1854 by naval officer Nikolai Chikhachev and a third by General Stepan Khrulev in 1855 (the Khrulev plan) though, again, these were not progressed. The British historian Peter Hopkirk, writing in 2001, notes that the British authorities in India were confident that any invasion of India via the North-West Frontier could be defeated. Hopkirk considers that the Duhamel plan was unlikely to succeed, relying as they did on co-operation between Afghanistan and Persia and for their populations to allow a foreign army to march across their lands.

Duhamel was correct about the vulnerability of India to rebellion: the Indian Mutiny broke out there in 1857. The Crimean War had ended with Russian defeat in 1856 and Russia lent no support to the Indian rebels during the mutiny. In the following years Russia consolidated its power in Central Asia: it annexed Bukhara in 1868, Khiva in 1873 and Kokand in 1876.

== See also ==
- Khrulev plan, alternative contemporary Russian plan to invade India
- Indian March of Paul, Napoleonic era plan to invade India in cooperation with France
- Flashman at the Charge, novel by George MacDonald Fraser featuring the Duhamel plan as a plot element
