= Khrulev plan =

Proposed Russian invasion of India during the Crimean War

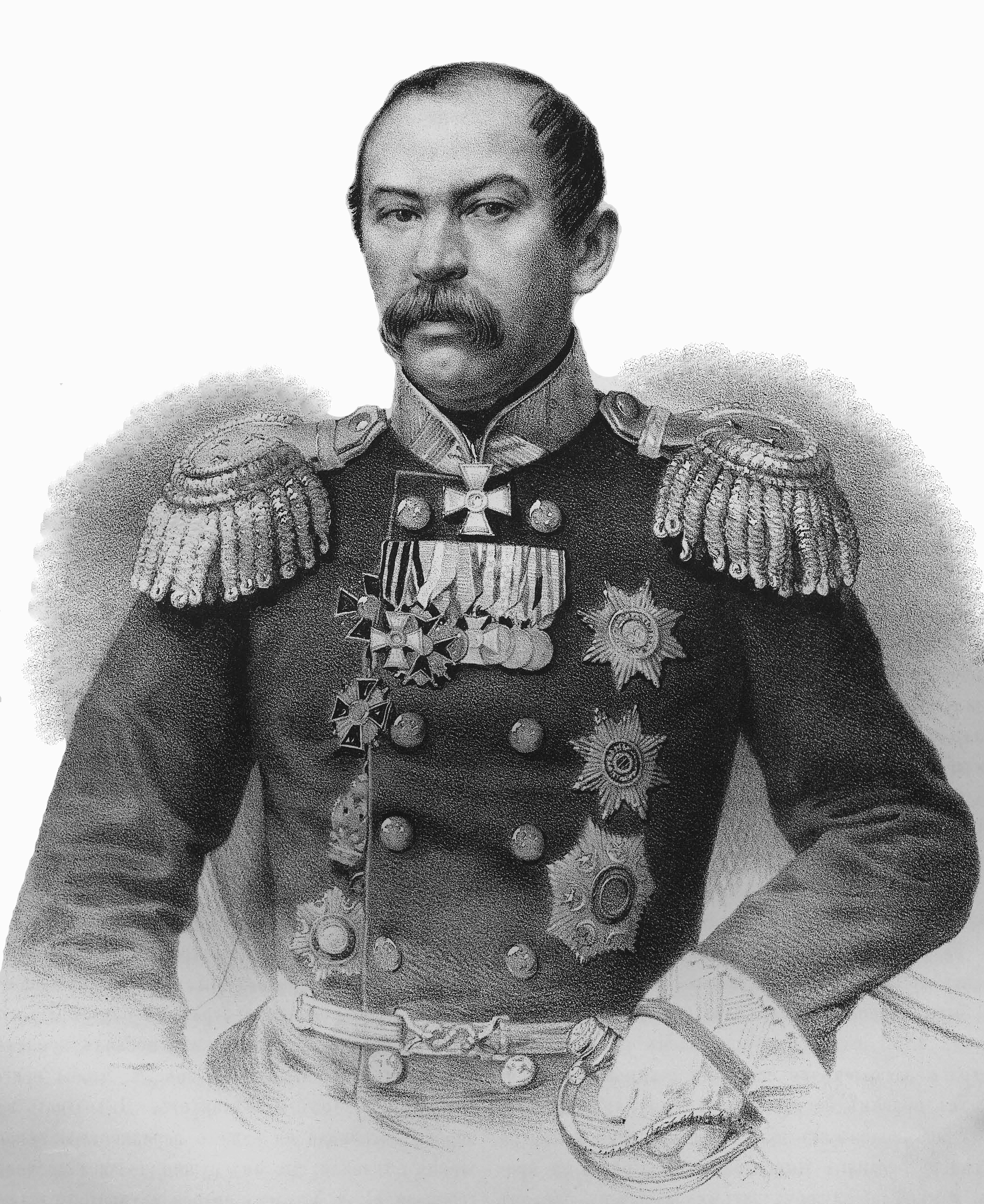
Khrulev depicted in the late 1860s

The Khrulev plan was a proposed Russian invasion of British-ruled India during the Crimean War, in which Russia was fighting Britain, France and the Ottoman Empire. The plan was proposed in 1855 by General Stepan Khrulev and would have seen 30,000 Russian troops marching on the North-West Frontier via Persia and Afghanistan. The majority of the men would be recruited from Central Asian tribesmen, with a small reserve of regular Russian troops. The plan was not put into effect before the war ended in Russian defeat in 1856.

== Background ==
Russia had been at war with the Ottoman Empire since 1853 and with Britain and France since March 1854 in the Crimean War. Britain had a relatively small standing army and in 1854 Russian General Alexander Osipovich Duhamel proposed an invasion of India to divert British troops from the Crimean theatre. Duhamel's invasion would have been via Persia and Afghanistan, but permission was refused due to the war requiring all available Russian troops.

== Plan ==
Khrulev's proposed route from the Russian Empire (white) via Persia (green) and Afghanistan (black). Principal cities of north-west India in red.

General Stepan Khrulev was a veteran of the fighting in the Crimea who was wounded during the Siege of Sevastopol. He returned to Russia and in 1855 proposed a new plan for the invasion of India. Khrulev considered that there were only around 25,000 European soldiers in the Presidency armies and the British Army in India. The remainder of the British and East India Company forces consisted of some 300,000 native soldiers, led by 7,300 British officers. Khrulev considered this element of the army to be fragile and liable to flee if their officers were killed. He also thought the British defenders were spread thinly along the 700-mile (1,100 km) North-West Frontier between India and Afghanistan. He considered that a Russian invasion might not take India on its own but that a strong presence in the North-West Frontier would affect the balance of power and require significant British forces to be moved to their rear areas in case of an Indian rebellion. Khrulev's proposal noted that "we may make compromises with our other foes; but England's bearing towards us, which tends to the weakening of our power, does not justify us in leaving her at peace. We must free the people who are the sources of her wealth, and prove to the world the might of the Russian Czar".

Khrulev's plan called for a force of 30,000 men to be raised. The majority of these would be drawn from the tribal population native to Central Asia, supported by a small reserve of regular Russian troops. This would allow the Russians to escape international embarrassment in case the invasion failed. Khrulev intended the expedition to assemble at the ancient fortress of Akkala (near modern Konye-Urgench, Turkmenistan) and advance to Afghanistan via Meshed in Persia (or alternatively via Astrabad, modern Gorgan in Iran). The Russian force would then progress through Afghanistan by way of Herat, Kandahar and Kabul. Khrulev did little in the way of detailed logistical planning. A Russian officer, Captain Blaremberg, had been attached to the Persian expedition of Mohammad Shah Qajar against Afghanistan in the late 1830s. Based on Blaremberg's reports Khrulev expected that the region could support an army of tens of thousands living off the land, that the roads were passable to artillery and supply wagons and that ample quantities of water, rice, barley and sheep could be obtained locally. Khrulev maintained Duhamel's assumption of an average daily progress of 25 versts (27 km; 17 mi) for the invasion force and anticipated they would reach Herat 35 days after leaving Akkala.

Khrulev's plan required that assurances of neutrality were received from Persia and that a means of protecting against Khivan, Bukharan and Kokandian attack during the Central Asia leg was found. Upon reaching Afghanistan the expedition would send envoys to Kabul to seek Afghan support and begin training tribesmen for war against the British. Khrulev thought that the presence of the Russian force in the country would "excite the national antipathy of the Afghans to the English" and "shake the power of the English in India". Khrulev considered that the British might attempt to foil the invasion by launching a pre-emptive attack on Afghanistan but thought that this would be to his advantage by causing outrage among the Afghans who would join his forces.

== Impact ==
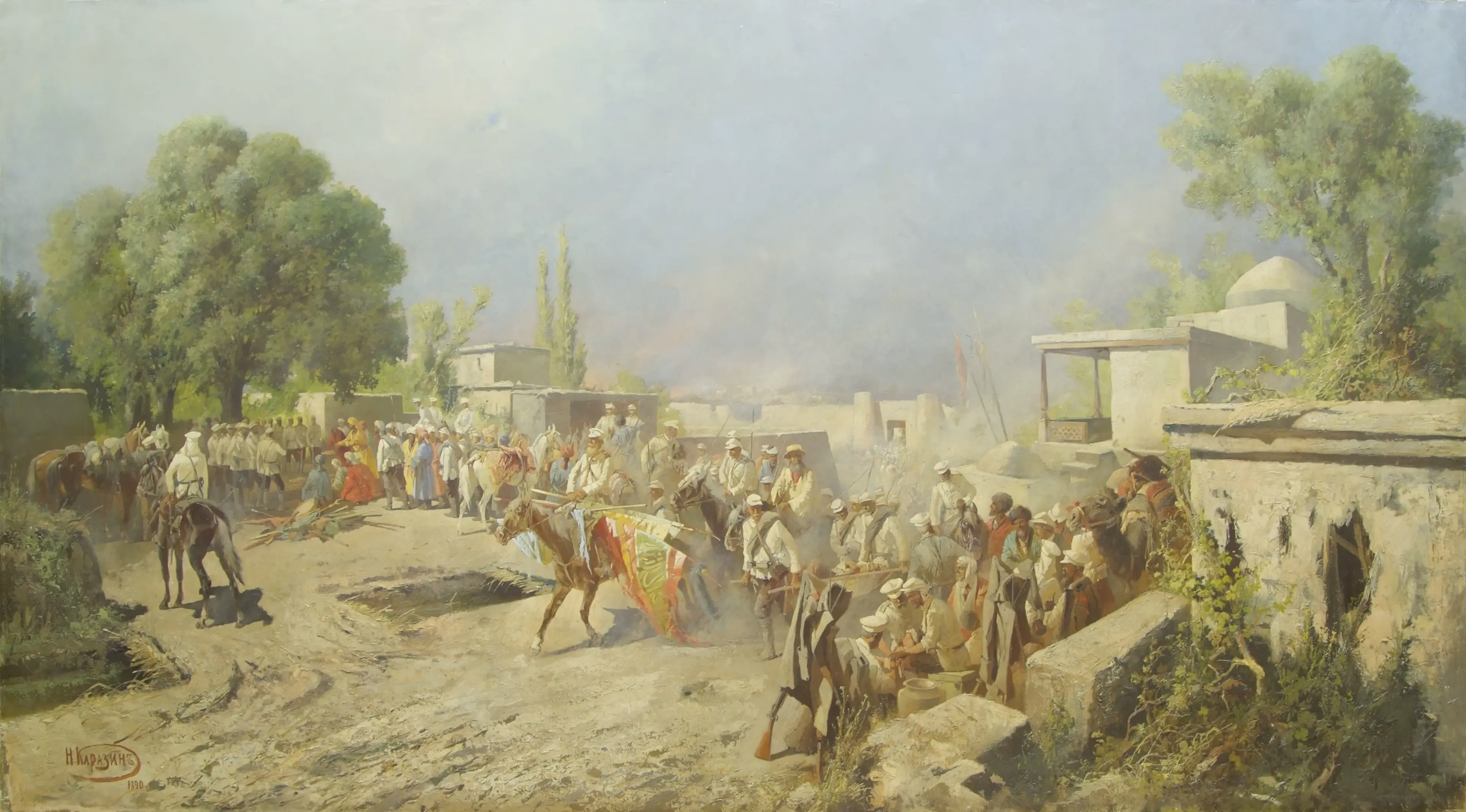
Russian troops occupying Tashkent, Kokand in 1865

The Khrulev plan was never put into action and the Crimean War ended with Russian defeat in 1856. Khrulev and Duhamel were right about the vulnerability of India to rebellion: the Indian Mutiny broke out there in 1857. Russia lent no assistance to the rebels and concentrated instead on securing its position in Central Asia; Bukhara was annexed in 1868, Khiva in 1873 and Kokand in 1876.

== See also ==
- Duhamel plan, alternative contemporary Russian plan to invade India
- Indian March of Paul, Napoleonic era plan to invade India in cooperation with France
- Flashman at the Charge, novel by George MacDonald Fraser featuring the Khrulev plan as a plot element
