= Agnia Grigas =

American political scientist and author

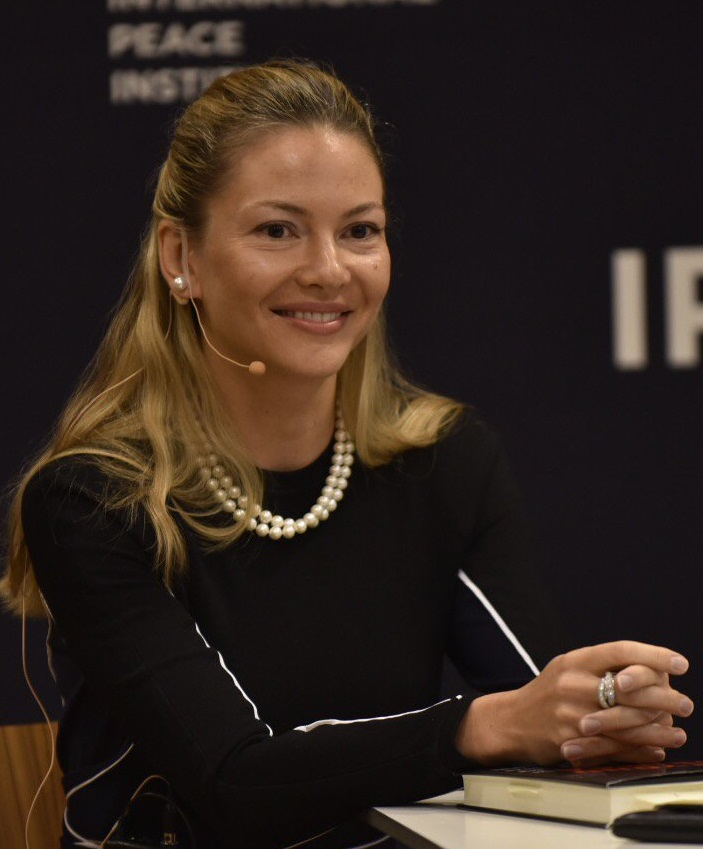
- Agnia Grigas at a presentation of her book Beyond Crimea: The New Russian Empire
- Born: November 21, 1979 (age 46); Kaunas, Lithuanian Soviet Socialist Republic
- Citizenship: American
- Education: Columbia University; University of Oxford
- Organization: Atlantic Council
- Website: grigas.net

Agnia Grigas (born November 21, 1979) is a Lithuanian-born American political scientist and author. Her research and publications focus on security and energy issues in Russia, Europe, and the Post-Soviet states. She holds a Doctorate in International Relations from the University of Oxford. She is a nonresident Senior Fellow at the Atlantic Council in Washington, DC.

== Education and early life ==
Agnia Grigas (née Baranauskaitė) was born in Kaunas, Lithuania while the country was still part of the Soviet Union. At the age of ten, she immigrated with her mother to the United States. In 2002 Grigas graduated with a Bachelor of Arts in Economics and Political Science from Columbia University. In 2006 she earned a Master’s (MPhil) in International Relations from St Antony's College, Oxford and subsequently in 2011 her Doctorate (DPhil) in International Relations from Brasenose College, Oxford.

== Career ==
In 2002, Grigas started her career as a financial analyst at JPMorgan Chase in London, where she worked on Eurobond issuance for corporations and governments. In 2007, after completing her master’s studies, Grigas joined Eurasia Group as an associate, advising on Central and Eastern Europe and the post-Soviet States, and establishing the firm's coverage of the Baltic States.

In 2008-2009 Grigas served as an advisor on energy security and economy to the Lithuanian Ministry of Foreign Affairs, under Minister Vygaudas Ušackas. She worked on regional gas diversification, including the early stages of the Klaipeda LNG FSRU, and on a foreign investment project by Barclays. She subsequently consulted for Barclays regarding the opening of their engineering center in Vilnius, Lithuania.

In 2014 Grigas became a nonresident Senior Fellow at the McKinnon Center for Global Affairs at Occidental College in Los Angeles. In 2015, she joined the Truman National Security Project as a Security Fellow. Since 2015 she is a nonresident Senior Fellow at the Dinu Patriciu Eurasia Center in Atlantic Council in Washington, DC.

== Books ==
- The Politics of Energy and Memory between the Baltic States and Russia (New ed.). Farnham: Ashgate. 2012. ISBN 9781409446538.
  Grigas’s first book examines the foreign policies of the Baltic States towards Russia in respect of the politics of oil and gas, and the Soviet historical legacy. The second edition was released in 2016 by Routledge.
- Beyond Crimea: The New Russian Empire. Yale University Press. February 16, 2016. ISBN 978-0300214505.
  In her second book, Grigas argues that Moscow uses compatriots in bordering nations for territorial ambitions, citing examples in Ukraine and Georgia, and discussing potential risks for countries including Moldova, Kazakhstan, and the Baltic States.
- The New Geopolitics of Natural Gas. Harvard University Press. April 24, 2017. ISBN 9780674971837.
  Grigas's third book examines the impact of shale gas production in the United States, global LNG trade, and gas transport infrastructure on the natural gas industry.
