= Russia in Global Affairs =

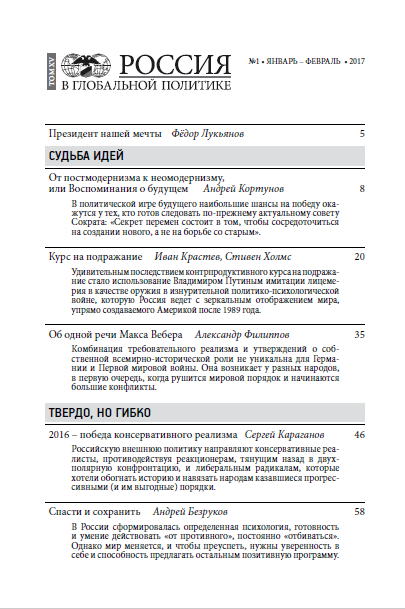
- Discipline: International relations, political science
- Language: Russian, English
- Edited by: Fyodor Lukyanov

Publication details
- History: 2002–present
- Publisher: Council on Foreign and Defense Policy; Russian International Affairs Council; RIA Novosti; (Russia)
- Frequency: Bimonthly (6 times per year)
- ISO 4: Find out here

Indexing
- ISSN: 1810-6374 (print); 2618-9844 (web)

Links
- Journal homepage

Russia in Global Affairs (Россия в глобальной политике) is a Russian scholarly and political science journal dedicated to issues of Russian foreign policy and globalization. It has been published by the Foundation for World Politics Research since November 2002, with support from the American journal Foreign Affairs. The journal's financing comes from Russian sources. It is part of the "Russia and Globalization" project of the Russian non-governmental public association, the Council on Foreign and Defense Policy (SVOP). The journal is published bimonthly (6 times a year), with each issue containing 18 articles.

The journal publishes analytical materials from both Russian and foreign specialists in international relations, and it also reprints articles from Foreign Affairs and other prestigious foreign publications.

The journal has English, Czech, and Polish editions.

The editor-in-chief since the journal's founding has been Fyodor Lukyanov, chairman of the presidium of the Council on Foreign and Defense Policy. The editorial board is headed by Sergey Karaganov, the honorary chairman of the presidium of the Council on Foreign and Defense Policy.

The editorial board has 40 members, including the Minister of Foreign Affairs of the Russian Federation Sergey Lavrov, the rector of MGIMO Anatoly Torkunov, former US Deputy Assistant Secretary of the Treasury for International Affairs C. Fred Bergsten, former Prime Minister and Minister for Foreign Affairs of Sweden Carl Bildt, president of the Russian International Affairs Council Igor Ivanov, director of the French Institute of International Relations Thierry de Montbrial, former editor of Foreign Affairs Gideon Rose, and professor at Peking University Xiong Guangkai, among others.

The current founders of the journal are the Council on Foreign and Defense Policy (SVOP), the Russian International Affairs Council (RIAC), and the news agency RIA Novosti (the publisher of Izvestia newspaper.)

== History ==
In 2002, the Council on Foreign and Defense Policy (SVOP), which considers one of its main tasks to be the promotiing a positive image of the Russian Federation on the world stage, released a pilot issue of Russia in Global Affairs as part of its "Russia and Globalization" project.

The journal's original founders were the Council on Foreign and Defense Policy (SVOP), the Russian Union of Industrialists and Entrepreneurs, and the publishing house Izvestia.

From November 2002 to December 2003, the journal was published quarterly. Beginning in January 2004, it switched to a bimonthly schedule, following the model of Foreign Affairs.

The first issue was dated November–December 2002.

In his introductory note, titled "Globalism for One and All," editor-in-chief Fyodor Lukyanov noted that the publication belongs to the "thick journal" genre and that its main task is not to react immediately to current events in world politics, but to identify and analyze global political trends.

In an interview with Izvestia about the journal's launch, Lukyanov stated that a large part of the Russian elite does not understand its "Western brethren" because Russia has become detached from international processes in recent years and now suffers from a lack of information about political trends in the West. Thus, the task of Russia in Global Affairs was to provide this "quality analytical information online."

Also, on the eve of the first issue's presentation, Foreign Affairs publisher David Kellogg announced that as part of the collaboration between the two journals, it was agreed that each issue of the Russian edition would feature several translated articles from Foreign Affairs and vice versa. In addition, the official websites of both media outlets planned to post current information about their creative collaboration. Kellogg also stated that the creation of Russia in Global Affairs was a significant event, as "a favorable moment has come in the world to establish a direct connection between the leaders and political scientists" of Russia and the United States, and that the launch of such a publication would help "to better understand the policy goals of the two countries, to outline what brings us together."

The main theme of the first issue was the Russian Federation's place in the modern world of international relations.

In particular, an article by the former Minister for CIS Affairs, Anatoly Adamishin, titled "On the Path to a World Government," raised the question of Russia's participation in building a new world order to gradually replace the former bipolar world structure that ceased to exist after the dissolution of the Soviet Union in 1991. It argued that Russia should propose its own version for organizing a "renewed scheme for managing international processes."

In an article titled "The Burden of Global Responsibility," the former Chancellor of the Federal Republic of Germany, Helmut Schmidt, wrote that Russia plays an important role in the world due to its mineral reserves, rather than its military, space, or nuclear potential. He also noted a rapprochement between Russia and the United States, which he considered a victory for America, that had managed to extend its influence to the East.

On January 16, 2003, the English-language version of the journal was presented. It was noted that the English edition would publish translated articles by authors from the staff of Russia in Global Affairs, as well as translated materials from other authoritative Russian publications.

At the presentation, editor-in-chief Fyodor Lukyanov stated that the English version would be useful for foreign researchers specializing in Russia and Eastern Europe. The chairman of the editorial board, Sergey Karaganov, noted that the English-language Russia in Global Affairs would help "bridge the gap between Russia and the outside world."

On February 10, 2005, on Russia's Diplomat's Day, the Polish version of the journal was presented in Warsaw. The event took place at the headquarters of the Polish Press Agency (PAP) and was combined with a RIA Novosti photo exhibition, "From the History of Russian Diplomacy."

On February 21, 2006, the Czech version of the journal was introduced in Prague, a joint project of the Embassy of Russia in the Czech Republic, the local office of RIA Novosti, and the journal's Russian editorial office.

The first issue featured an article by Russian Foreign Minister Sergey Lavrov. The Ambassador of Russia to the Czech Republic, Aleksey Fedotov, presented that issue to the country's president, Václav Klaus, on the same day.

At the presentation, Fyodor Lukyanov noted that the Czech version would contribute to "restoring lost contacts in this part of Europe," also stating that such initiatives are of great importance for establishing stable relations between Russia and the European Union.

The chief editor of the Czech version, Natalia Sudlenkova, promised that "the lack of objective information about Russia in the Czech Republic will now be compensated for to a certain extent."

A year after the launch of the Czech edition, Sudlenkova reported that many local residents had shown genuine interest in the journal and had requested printed versions. She also noted that the publication was held in high regard by Czech universities.

On February 20, 2013, Russia in Global Affairs underwent re-registration due to a change in its founders. Of the original founders, the Council on Foreign and Defense Policy (SVOP) retained its position, while the Russian Union of Industrialists and Entrepreneurs and the publishing house Izvestia were replaced by the Russian International Affairs Council (RIAC) and RIA Novosti.

Editor-in-chief Fyodor Lukyanov noted that after these changes, the journal became associated with the three "most influential Russian structures" in the field of international relations coverage. He also expressed pride that RIAC President Igor Ivanov had been a member of the journal's editorial board since its inception.

== Positioning ==
The authors include political scientists and geopoliticians with close connections to the Russian government (a notable exception is Alexander Dugin, who is not among the authors of the journal). Judging from its content, the publication is not in the opposition to the Russian authorities, but at the same time the authors are not "propaganda mouthpieces" for the government of Russia.

In an interview with the official website of the Russian International Affairs Council (RIAC), editor-in-chief Fyodor Lukyanov described the style of his publication as follows:

We try to walk a fine line—to combine the professionalism and competence of our authors with accessible presentation of the material. In terms of depth of analysis, of course, there are more fundamental journals, academic and departmental ones, but due to the specifics of the genre, their texts are deliberately more complex, designed for professionals. We, on the other hand, address not only specialists but also those who are simply interested in foreign policy (clearly, I don't mean a layperson's interest, but rather a reader who is at least minimally prepared) and want to understand what is happening around them.

— РСМД вошел в состав учредителей журнала «Россия в глобальной политике»

The chairman of the editorial board, Sergey Karaganov, comparing Russia in Global Affairs with the Foreign Ministry's journal International Affairs, expressed the opinion that Russia in Global Affairs can express a wider range of ideas because it is not tied to government structures and can write in a freer style. Karaganov also stated that his journal can attract a broader audience as it is not aimed at a narrow circle of specialists in international relations and is not strictly scientific or political, but rather has a scholarly and educational character.

== Ranking ==
According to the Russian Science Citation Index (RSCI), the journal's impact factor is 0.328.

In 2015, the Higher School of Economics (HSE), where editor-in-chief Fyodor Lukyanov is a professor, conducted an expert ranking of Russian scientific journals. According to the results, Russia in Global Affairs was recognized as a medium-level publication.

The study was conducted from February 2014 to January 2015 with the participation of 630 experts, who were asked to identify journals from provided lists that they were familiar with and that, in their opinion, deserved the title of "scientific." Following this procedure, the experts completed questionnaires evaluating the selected journals. Based on the expert assessments, the publications were divided into three groups: A1 for high-level broad-profile journals, A2 for high-level specialized journals, and B for all medium-level journals. Russia in Global Affairs was placed in group B.

== Sources ==
- Babenko, N. V. (2003). "Обзор материалов журнала «Россия в глобальной политике» (ноябрь/декабрь 2002 Г. )" [Review of November/December 2002 issue of the journal "Russia in Global Politics"]. Сер. 5, История: Информационно-аналитический журнал (in Russian) (3): 183–187.
- Szul, Roman (2023). "Sytuacja Rosji w opiniach geopolityków rosyjskich. Na podstawie "Россия в глобальной политике"" [Russia’s Position According to Russian Geopoliticians (Based on "Russia in Global Affairs”)] (PDF). Przegląd Geopolityczny (in Polish). 45: 9–31.
