= Sergei Lousianin =

Russian political scientist and orientalist

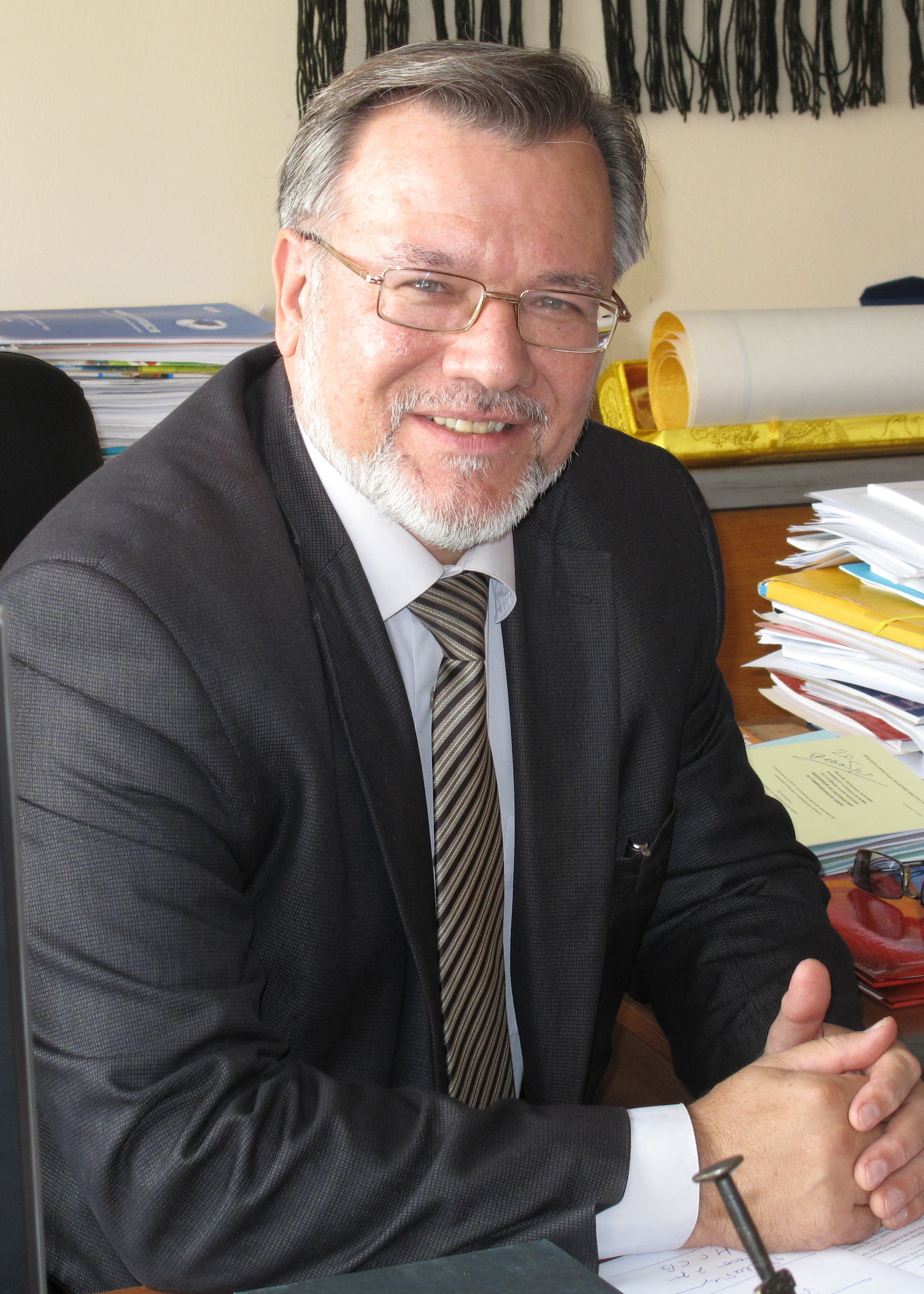
- Born: Sergei G. Lousianin; July 23, 1956; Irkutsk Oblast, USSR
- Education: Institute of Oriental Studies of the Russian Academy of Sciences
- Scientific career
- Fields: Political science, Oriental studies
- Workplaces: Institute of Far Eastern Studies of the Russian Academy of Sciences

Sergei Lousianin (Russian: Сергей Геннадьевич Лузянин, romanized: Sergey Gennadievich Luzyanin, Chinese: 卢加宁, born 23 July 1956) is a Russian political scientist, orientalist, an expert on international relations in East Asia, domestic and foreign policy of China and Mongolia, security issues in the Asia-Pacific Region and Central Asia.

Doctor of Historical Sciences, Professor. Director of the Institute of Far Eastern Studies, Russian Academy of Science (IFES RAS), Professor at the Moscow State Institute of International Relations (MGIMO), Professor at the National Research University – Higher School of Economics, expert of the Russian International Affairs Council, President of the Oriental Studies Support Foundation.

== Early life and education ==
Lousianin was born on 23 of July, 1956, in Irkutsk. He graduated with distinction from the Pedagogical Institute of Irkutsk State University in 1977, and completed his Ph.D. at the Institute of Oriental Studies of the Russian Academy of Sciences in 1984 (thesis title: "China in the Russian-Mongolian relations, 1911-1919"). In 1994 he received the degree of Doctor of Sciences, thesis title: "Russia, Mongolia and China in the first half of the 20th century".

He speaks Chinese, Mongolian, English, and Russian languages.

== Career ==
- 1990s – Teaching in different universities in the Russian regions;
- 1998 – Internship in the John M. Olin Institute for Strategic Studies, Harvard University, United States (Dr. Samuel Huntington’s seminar);
- 1999-2001 – Deputy Head of Center "Russia-China", IFES RAS;
- 2001-2002 – Internship in the China Foreign Affairs University (Beijing).
- 2001-2009 – Co-director of the Master's program "Regions of Asia and Africa" at MGIMO (direction "International Area Studies"); Professor of the Department of Oriental Studies at MGIMO; Director of the MGIMO International Research Center "Russia – ASEAN";
- 2009-2014 – Deputy Director for Science at the IFES RAS; Head of the Center for Strategic Problems of Northeast Asia and SCO, IFES RAS; Professor of the Department of Oriental Studies at MGIMO;
- 2014-2015 – The head of the joint projects of the Russian International Affairs Council: "Russian-Chinese dialogue: Model 2015", "Shanghai Cooperation Organization: Model 2014-2015", "Russian-Chinese dialogue: Model 2016", etc.
- From November 2014 – Acting director of the Institute of Far Eastern Studies RAS; Professor at the National Research University – Higher School of Economics;
- From July 2016 – Director of the IFES RAS.

== Academic activities ==
Author of over 400 scientific papers, including 7 monographs.
