= Valdai Discussion Club =

Moscow-based think tank

Coordinates: 55.737139°N 37.635055°E

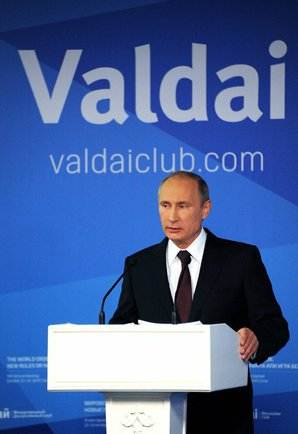
- Vladimir Putin giving a speech at the Valdai Club gallery in October 2014
- Type: Think tank
- Founded: 2004
- Headquarters: Moscow, Russia
- Key people: Andrey Bystritskiy; Nadezhda Lavrentieva; Fyodor Lukyanov
- Website: valdaiclub.com

The Valdai Discussion Club is a Moscow-based think tank and discussion forum. It was established in 2004 and is named after Lake Valdayskoye, which is located close to Veliky Novgorod, where the club's first meeting took place. In 2014, the management of the club was transferred to the Valdai Club Foundation, established in 2011 by the Council for Foreign and Defense Policy, the Russian International Affairs Council, Moscow State Institute of International Relations, and the Higher School of Economics.

== Overview ==
The 2004 Valdai conference was attended by Russian president Vladimir Putin. Among many other Russian Government officials attending Valdai meetings are Dmitry Medvedev, former Prime Minister and former president; Sergey Ivanov, former Chief of Staff of the Presidential Executive Office; Sergey Lavrov, Minister of Foreign Affairs; Sergey Shoygu, former Minister of Defence.

The club also operates regional programmes – Asian, Mid-Eastern and Euro-Atlantic Dialogues. It holds a special session at the St. Petersburg International Economic Forum and the Eastern Economic Forum. Stanislav Zas, Secretary-General of the Collective Security Treaty Organization spoke at Valdai in February 2022.

Daniel W. Drezner, professor of international politics at the Fletcher School of Law and Diplomacy at Tufts University, described Valdai as "a swanky high-level conference put on by the Russian elite" and "the highest-profile Russian equivalent to Davos (minus the corporate presence)". Drezner also wrote that the chief value to attendees is the ability to determine the official line of the Russian government, although attendance also risks "greater legitimacy on a government that has been accused of some less-than-legitimate activities as of late." Nikolay Petrov of the Carnegie Moscow Center identified Valdai as "a project used as blatant propaganda by the Kremlin" while Russian sociologist Lilia Shevtsova criticized the Valdai conferences in an article entitled "Putin's Useful Idiots." Marcel H. Van Herpen wrote that Valdai was a soft power effort by the Kremlin in service of Russian foreign policy goals, with Russian leadership using the conference in a bid to gain goodwill among Western intellectuals, create networking opportunities between Russian and Western elites, and "create a testing ground for the Kremlin's foreign policy initiatives." Angus Roxburgh wrote that RIA Novosti was important to the establishment of Valdai during Putin's second term, and that the conference plays a key role in the Russian government's effort to burnish Putin's image and influence outsiders. Nikolay Petrov also wrote that the club has increasingly become a "propaganda tool." British journalist Angus Roxburgh described it as part of the Russian propaganda effort.

According to the Institute for the Study of War, in 2023, one of Valdai's contributors, Konstantin Zatulin, stated that Russia had failed to achieve any of its major goals during the Russo-Ukrainian War. These he listed as "denazification, demilitarization, the neutrality of Ukraine, and the protection of the inhabitants of the Donetsk and Luhansk People’s Republics". He said that these goals "have ceased to hold actual meaning" and suggested that Russian forces should have been more aggressive in efforts to push Ukrainian forces back from the borders of Donetsk and Luhansk oblasts.

The Valdai Discussion Club Foundation has been sanctioned in connection with Russia's aggression against Ukraine, by Ukraine and by Canada.

In John Mearsheimer's 2023 book How States Think, the preface acknowledges him receiving a small financial support from Valdai in conjunction with Best Book award for his 2019 book The Great Delusion.

== Annual meetings ==
Title	Place	Date	Notes
Russia at the Turn of the Century: Hopes and Reality	Veliky Novgorod	September 2–5, 2004	
Russia as a Political Kaleidoscope	cruise ship Alexander Radishchev (traveled from Moscow to Tver and back)	September 2–5, 2005	
Global Energy in the 21st Century: Russia's Role and Position	Moscow and Khanty-Mansiysk	September 4–9, 2006	
Russia at the crossroads - choice and identity	Moscow and Kazan	September 10–14, 2007	
Russia's Role in the Global Geopolitical Revolution of the Early 21st Century	Moscow, Rostov-on-Don and Grozny	September 9–14, 2008	
Russia – West: Back to the Future	Yakutsk and Moscow	September 7–15, 2009	
Russia: History and Future Development	St. Petersburg, Karelia, Sochi	September 1–7, 2010	
The 2011–2012 Elections and the Future of Russia: Development Scenarios for the Next 5–8 Years	Kaluga and Moscow	November 6–12, 2011	
The Future Is Being Made Today: Scenarios for Russia's Economic Development	St. Petersburg and Moscow	October 20–26, 2012	
Russia's Diversity for the Modern World	Novgorod Oblast	September 16–19, 2013	
The World Order: New Rules or a Game Without Rules	Sochi	October 22–24, 2014	
Societies Between War and Peace: Overcoming the Logic of Conflict in Tomorrow's World	Sochi	October 19–22, 2015	
The Future in Progress: Shaping the World of Tomorrow	Sochi	October 24–27, 2016	
Creative Destruction: Will a New World Order Emerge from the Current Conflicts?	Sochi	October 16–19, 2017	
Russia: Agenda for the 21st Century	Sochi	October 15–18, 2018	Former president of Afghanistan Hamid Karzai attended the plenary session
The Dawn of the East and the World Political Order	Sochi	September 30 – October 3, 2019	Presidents of the Philippines Rodrigo Duterte, Kazakhstan Kassym-Jomart Tokayev, Azerbaijan Ilham Aliyev and King Abdullah II of Jordan attended the plenary session
The Lessons of the Pandemic and the New Agenda: How to Turn the World Crisis Into an Opportunity for the World	Moscow	October 20–22, 2020	
Global Shake-Up in the 21st Century: The Individual, Values, and the State	Sochi	October 18–21, 2021	
A Post-Hegemonic World: Justice and Security for Everyone	Moscow	October 24–27, 2022	
Fair Multipolarity: How to Ensure Security and Development for Everyone	Sochi	October 2–5, 2023	
Lasting Peace on What Basis? Common Security and Equal Opportunities for Development in the 21st Century	Sochi	November 7, 2024	
The Polycentric World: Instructions for Use	Sochi	October 2, 2025	

== See also ==
- 2014 Valdai speech of Vladimir Putin
- Yaroslavl Global Policy Forum
