= Operation Hudson Harbor =

1951–1953 Korean War training operation

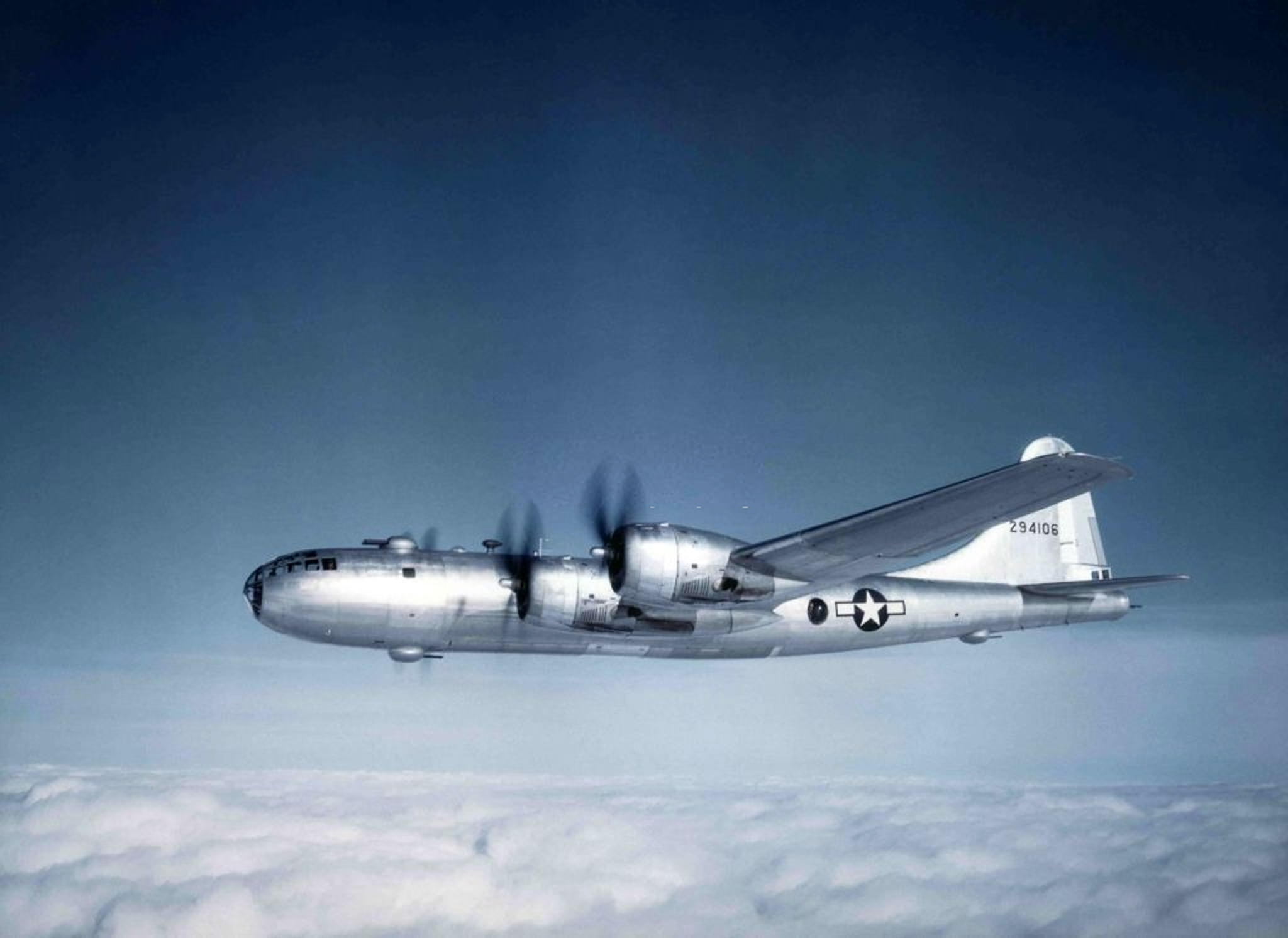
Being one of the only American aircraft capable of deploying a nuclear weapon at the time, the B-29 bomber was the backbone of the training exercise

Operation Hudson Harbor was a United States Air Force Nuclear Strike training operation against North Korea, China, and the Soviet Union during the Korean War that was never escalated further.

== Background ==
When the United States first committed military support to South Korea against the communists, their efforts initially came with little success, as they were driven almost completely out of the peninsula. After the landing at Inchon, UN forces moved north toward the Yalu River. Toward the end of October 1950, large numbers of Chinese crossed into North Korea. On November 1, they attacked the 8th Cavalry Regiment at Unsan, forcing that regiment to retreat and decimating the third battalion. At the same time, other Chinese troops attacked other American units along the Chongchon River, forcing them to retreat also. Fearing a drive which would cut off the 24th Infantry Division, which was advancing up the west coast, General Walker ordered them to withdraw southward. The Chinese held off any major attacks for over three weeks. At that time, they pushed UN forces south below the 38th parallel. With more reinforcements coming from the People's Republic of China, American high command began to fear a communist victory in Korea. They began to consider more options, including the use of nuclear weapons.

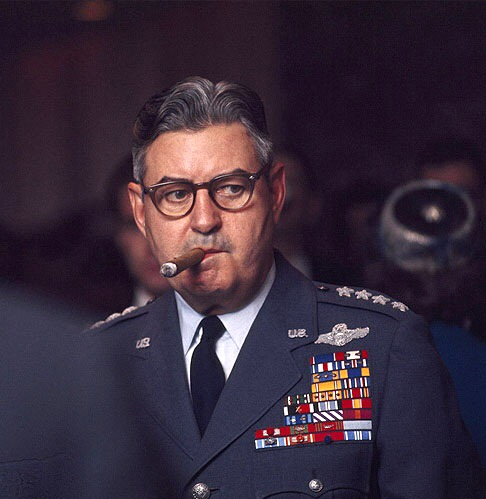
General Curtis Lemay, whom was placed in charge of planning potential nuclear strikes in Korea

== Plan ==
In October 1951, the U.S. effected Operation Hudson Harbor to establish nuclear capability against any communist forces and to scare the Soviets from action. B-29 bombers practiced individual runs (using dummy nuclear or conventional bombs) from Okinawa to North Korea. Every factor of these missions could not be the same as an actual nuclear strike, as there is no way to replicate all of the steps from preload testing through the actual release of the bombs while using conventional bombs. The intention was to both be entirely prepared for any ordered strikes and also intimidate the communists with the ease of US ability to fly nuclear bombs overhead.

Nuclear cores were deployed and thus the Air Force had several nuclear weapons at their disposal. Command of any nuclear strike was given to General Curtis LeMay. The plan was to destroy large military targets, power plants, and also create a ring of blast zones through Manchuria to dissuade any further intervention from the communists. Although the use of nuclear weapons was approved, they were never needed because the Chinese and North Koreans eventually signed the Korean Armistice Agreement. In actuality, although the US almost lost the war and was prepared to follow through with the plan, by 1953 the US had pushed the communist forces back across the current armistice line before a ceasefire was called, and thus it was unneeded. Had the United States gone through with the attacks, hence setting precedent for the use of nuclear weapons in proxy wars, it's likely the stakes of the Cold War would have increased dramatically.

== See also ==
- Nuclear blackmail
- Pumpkin bomb
