= Sergey Karaganov =

Russian political scientist (born 1952)

- Сергей Караганов
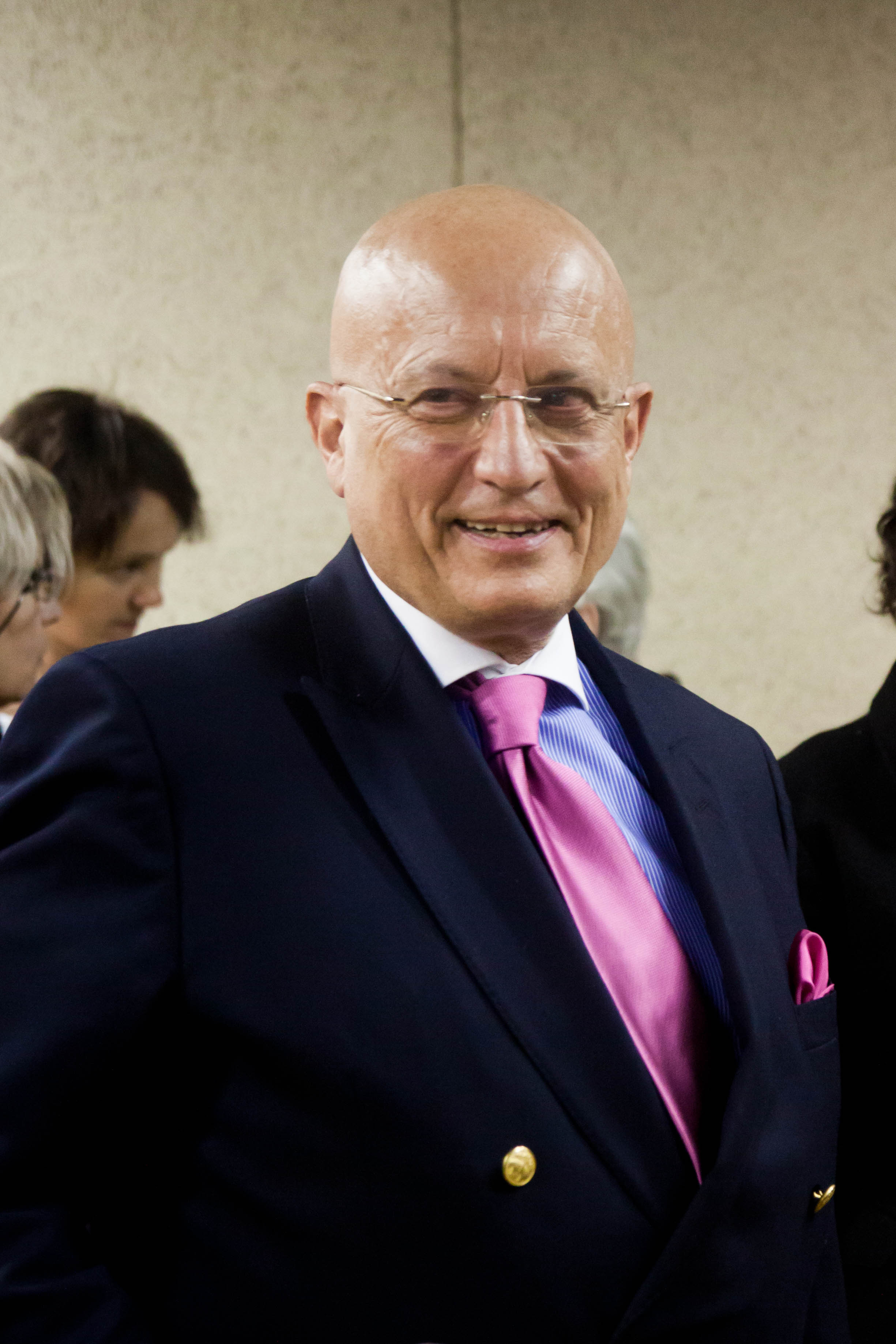
- Karaganov in 2017
- Born: 12 September 1952 (age 73); Moscow, Russian SFSR, Soviet Union
- Education: Moscow State University
- Occupations: Political scientist; opinion journalist
- Sergei Karaganov's voice On the Echo of Moscow Program, 26 May 2014

Sergey Alexandrovich Karaganov (Russian: Серге́й Алекса́ндрович Карага́нов, born 12 September 1952) is a Russian political scientist who heads the Council for Foreign and Defense Policy, a security analytical institution founded by Vitaly Shlykov. He is also the dean of the Faculty of World Economy and International Affairs at Moscow's Higher School of Economics. Karaganov was a close associate of Yevgeny Primakov, and has been Presidential Advisor to both Boris Yeltsin and Vladimir Putin. He is considered close to Putin and Sergey Lavrov.

Karaganov has been a member of the Trilateral Commission since 1998, and served on the International Advisory Board of the Council on Foreign Relations. He has also been Deputy Director of the Institute of Europe at the USSR (now Russian) Academy of Sciences since 1983.

== Early life ==
Karaganov came from a mixed Russian and Jewish family; his Russian father was Aleksandr Vasilyevich Karaganov (1915–2007), a film and literature scholar, and his Jewish mother was Sofia Grigorievna Karaganova (née Mazeh, 1918–2013), the first wife of the Soviet poet Yevgeny Dolmatovsky.

Aleksandr Karaganov, as deputy chairman of the All-Union Society for Cultural Relations with Foreign Countries (VOKS) and chief editor of the English-language magazine Soviet Literature, was in charge of organizing the trip of American writer John Steinbeck and photographer Robert Capa to the USSR in 1947. Steinbeck then wrote about him in his travel book A Russian Journal, published in 1948.

Sofia Karaganov's family, the Mazehs, are Belarusian-Jewish nobility, originally from Barysaw in Minsk region. Sofia's great-uncle was the Chief Rabbi of Moscow Yaakov Mazeh (Hebrew: יעקב מזא"ה; 1859–1924), a leading figure in Russian Jewry. Rabbi Yaakov helped Sofia's family and her brother David leave Belarus for Moscow.

== Career and political views ==
=== Political thought ===
==== Karaganov Doctrine ====
Karaganov is known as the progenitor of the Karaganov Doctrine, which states that Moscow should pose as the defender of human rights of ethnic Russians living in the "near abroad" for the purpose of gaining political influence in these regions. In 1992, he formulated the hypothesis that the Russian leadership might feel compelled to use force in order to achieve this goal. This idea was first brought into domestic Russian Federation politics by Boris Yeltsin in 1992, although it was only a fringe ideology in Yeltsin's Russia. It has become a mainstream ideology in Putin's Russia after 2012.

After Karaganov published an article advocating this stance in 1992, Russia's foreign policy position linked Russian troop withdrawals from the Baltics with the end of "systemic discrimination" against Russians in these countries. It was already a subject of controversy in February 1994 when the doctrine was the subject of remarks by Lennart Meri, the then-president of Estonia, in his Matthiae-Mahl speech in Hamburg on 25 February.

In 2022 Karaganov claimed full ownership of this idea in a serious interview. In 2023 Walter Clemens wrote that Karaganov "was a key figure in building the groundwork for the war against Ukraine" because he propounded "that Moscow should pose as the defender of the human rights of ethnic Russians living" near to Russky Mir.

The Karaganov Doctrine has been likened by scholars to the idea that furnished Hitler's 1938 Anschluss of Austria.

==== Eurasianism as ideology ====
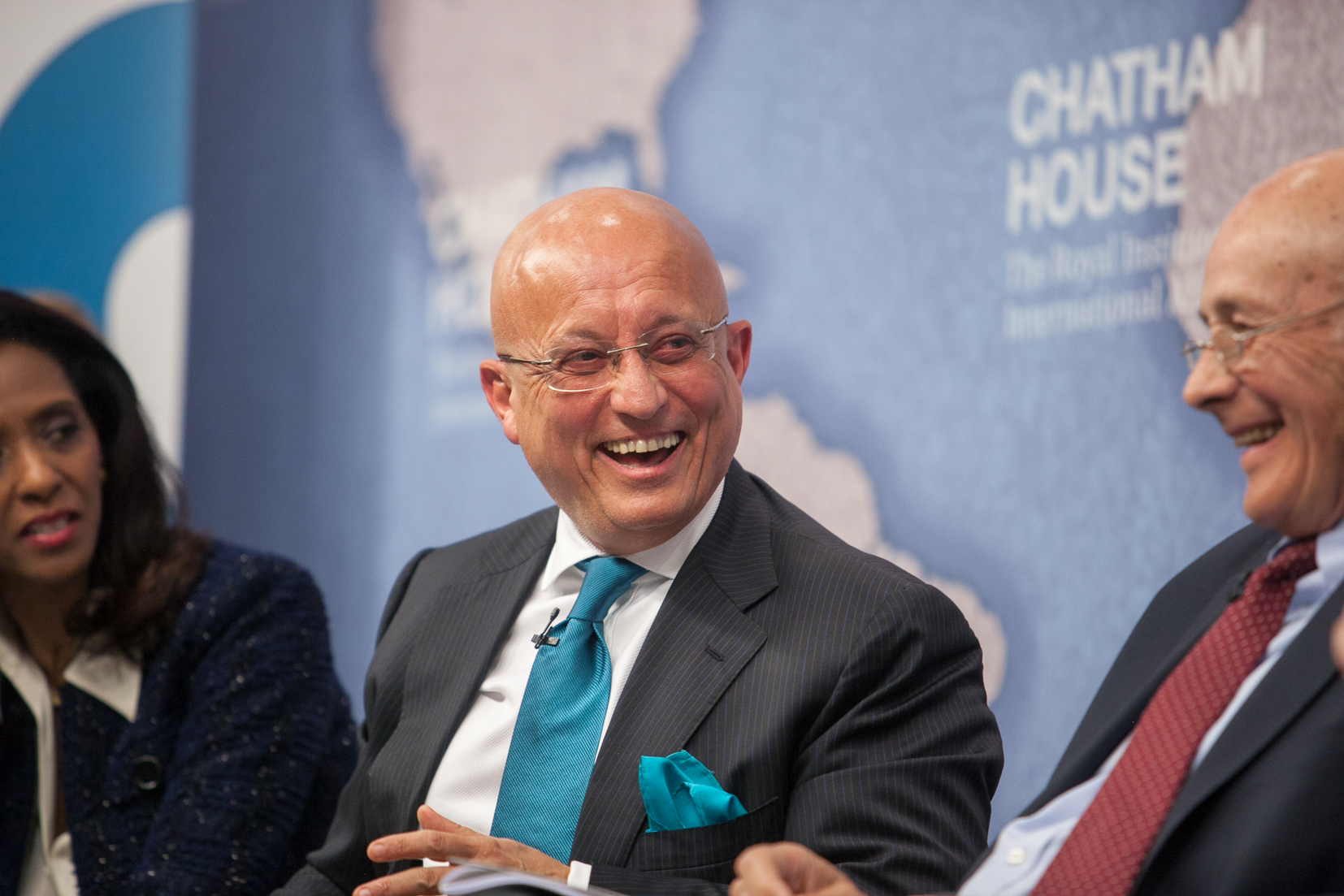
Sergey Karaganov in 2015

In addition to his Doctrine, Karaganov has advocated for a united Sino-Russian strategy to unify a Eurasian bloc. He argues that the Eurasian Economic Union (EEU) and China's One Belt One Road Initiative (OBOR), will work together to promote economic integration throughout the region. Many experts disagree with this judgement, claiming that China, as a far more powerful economy, will simply dominate this Eurasian bloc. This would counter Russian ambitions to regain their foothold as a global power.

==== Authoritarianism embedded into genetic code ====
Karaganov has been quoted to say: "Russia is genetically an authoritarian power. Russia's authoritarianism was not imposed from above but is the result of our history which has formed our genetic code."

==== On Russian might ====
In an April 2002 interview published in the journal Russia in Foreign Affairs, Karaganov defined Russia's main foreign policy goal as forcing its own dominance on the globe and breaking the security order put in place at the end of the Cold War in 1991.

He said shortly before the 2022 Russian invasion of Ukraine began:

The process of restoring Russian statehood, Russian influence, Russian power, which had been going on for quite a long time, had simply come to the surface ... Now as our strength, especially military strength, has accumulated and the geopolitical situation has changed, we felt the right to demand things, not to ask for them.

==== Russia's dependence on China ====
In April 2022, Karaganov said that Russia "will be more integrated and more dependent on China", further stating that "Chinese are our close allies and friends and the biggest source of Russian strength after Russian people themselves."

=== Role in Russia's war on Ukraine ===
In 2014, Karaganov warned that Russia may attack Ukraine, that "hell" would break out in Ukraine if Russia's demand that Ukraine remain a neutral state outside of NATO is ignored, and if the Russian-speaking regions in the east and south of Ukraine are not granted broad autonomy along the lines of the division of Bosnia and Herzegovina by the Dayton Agreement.

In an April 2019 interview with Time Magazine, Karaganov considered that not allowing Russia to join NATO was "one of the worst mistakes in political history. It automatically put Russia and the West on a collision course, eventually sacrificing Ukraine". In January 2022, he stated that NATO is a "political cancer" that aims to kill the "healthy" Russian state.

In January 2022, he denied accusations that Russia was planning to invade Ukraine and claimed that Russian troops were concentrated at the Russia–Ukraine border to prevent a possible Ukrainian attack on Donbas.

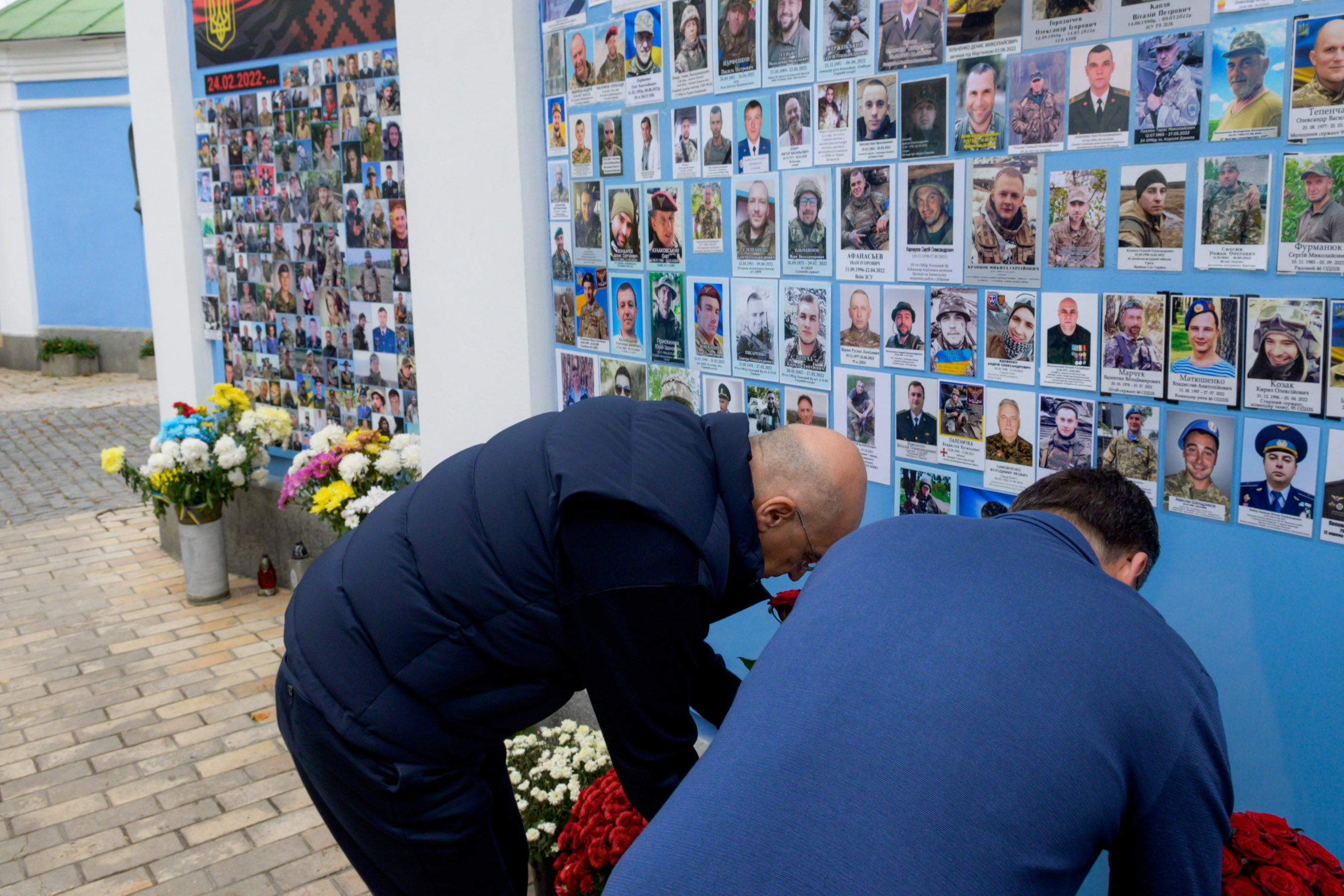
Ukrainian soldiers killed in the Russo-Ukrainian War in 2022. Karaganov called for the "destruction of Ukrainian military forces" and then to force Ukrainians to be "more peaceful and friendly to us."

Karaganov, who is known as a close advisor to Russian President Vladimir Putin, formulated many of the core ideas that led to Russia's invasion of Ukraine on 24 February 2022. One week earlier Karaganov explained that "the situation is so dire" that "war is inevitable", as Russia could only achieve its goals by military means, since, unlike the United States, the dominant post-Cold War power, Russia had no political, cultural, ideological or economic benefits by which to bring other states under its influence. Karaganov lamented that Russia's neighbors generally saw the West as offering more attractive political and economic models, and Russia therefore had no choice but to gain their submission by force.

Regarding Ukraine, Karaganov claimed that it was necessary to subdue it in order to prevent the further expansion of NATO. As justification for an aggression, Karaganov suggested that Ukraine was not a viable state anyway, and "most likely, the country will slowly disintegrate," or, alternatively, it will be broken up into smaller parts, and "something may go to Russia, something to Hungary, something to Poland, and something may remain a formally independent Ukrainian state." However, he has said that "occupying" Ukraine is "the worst-case scenario".

Instead of the legally-mandated "police action" or "special military operation", Karaganov uses the word "war" openly: "The stakes of the Russian elite are very high – for them it is an existential war." He has also said that "we need a kind of a solution which would be called peace, and which would include de facto the creation of some kind of a viable, pro-Russian government on the territory of Ukraine, and real security for the Donbas republics."

In April 2022, in an interview with the Italian newspaper Corriere della Sera, Karaganov stated that "war was inevitable, they were a spearhead of NATO. We made the very hard decision to strike first, before the threat becomes deadlier." He further said the war in Ukraine "will be used to restructure Russian elite and Russian society. It will become a more militant-based and national-based society, pushing out non-patriotic elements from the elite." He also said that "Demilitarization means destruction of Ukrainian military forces - that is happening and will accelerate. Of course, if Ukraine is supported with new weapons, that could prolong the agony. ... The war will be victorious, in one way or another. I assume demilitarization will be achieved and there will be denazification, too. Like we did in Germany and in Chechnya. Ukrainians will become much more peaceful and friendly to us."

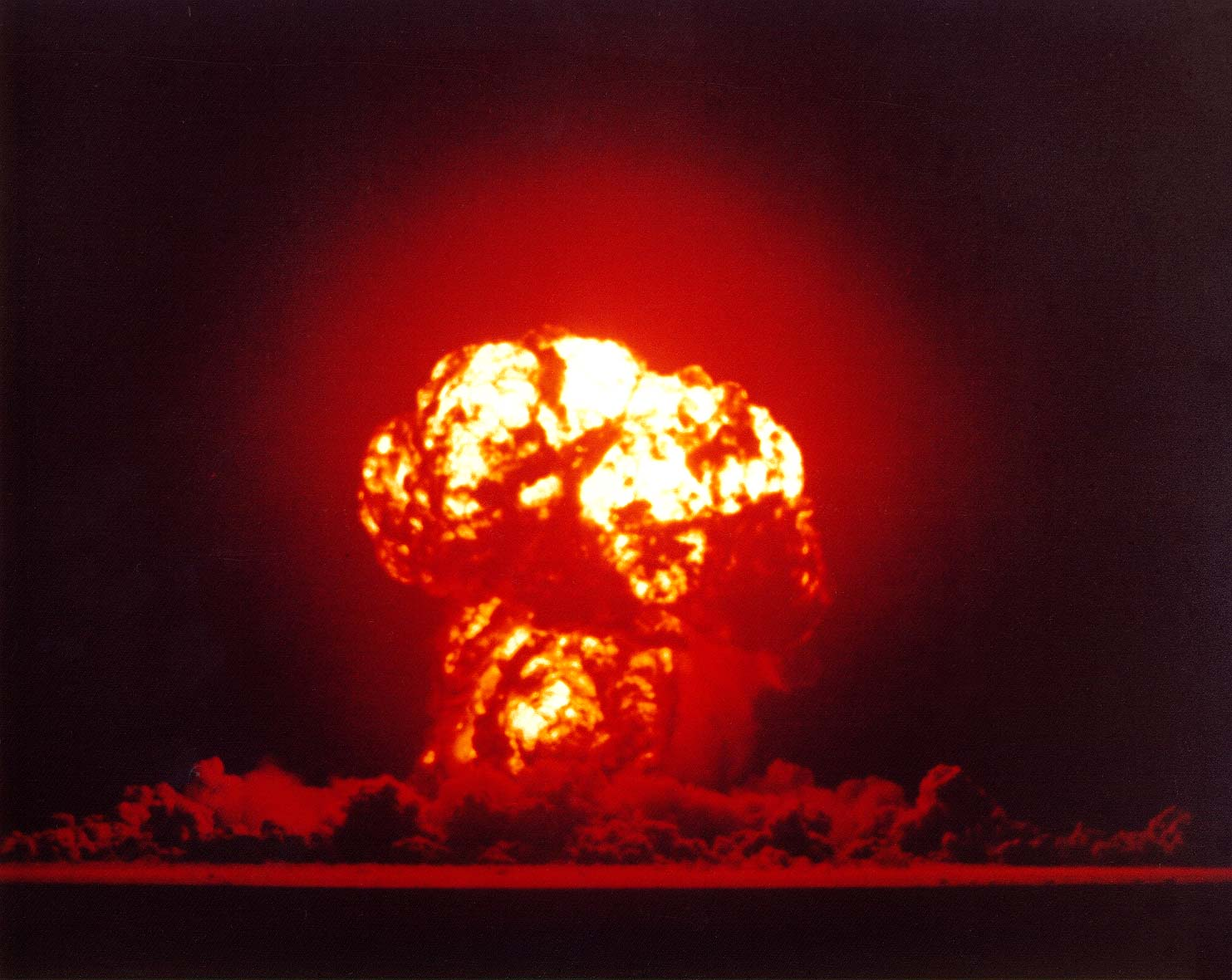
In June 2023, Karaganov called for nuclear strikes against NATO member states in Europe.

In May 2022 Karaganov stated India figured extremely high on the agenda of the Russian foreign policy and strong India-Russia ties will help stabilise New Delhi's ties with Beijing, besides bringing a balance in Moscow's partnership with China.

In June 2023, Karaganov called for the use of nuclear weapons by Russia against NATO member states in Europe, saying that "we will have to hit a bunch of targets in a number of countries in order to bring those who have lost their mind to reason." He concluded that "By breaking the West's will to continue the aggression, we will not only save ourselves and finally free the world from the five-century-long Western yoke, but we will also save humanity." According to Karaganov, "countries in the Global South would feel satisfaction from the defeat of their former oppressors" and Russia together with China "will win for the benefit of everyone, including the people living in Western countries." In response to Karaganov's suggestions, American historian Alexander J. Motyl wrote: "Some Western policymakers and analysts believe that Russia isn't irrational, that its rationality is unlike that found in the West. Whatever the case, just how does one talk to people who completely misunderstand geopolitical realities, truly believe that nuclear weapons are a product of divine intervention, aspire to create a messianic Russia, and believe that destroying Poznan and other European cities isn't to start World War III but to prevent it?." As of June 2023, Russian President Vladimir Putin rejected such proposals, saying "I reject this. ... First, we see no need to use it [a tactical nuclear strike]; and second, considering this, even as a possibility, factors into lowering the threshold for the use of such weapons." Also in 2023, Karaganov coauthored a critical analysis of Russian foreign policy in recent years. In this paper, he and other coauthors recommended the annexion of Ukraine's southeastern regions. Meanwhile, according to them, the energy, industrial, and transport infrastructure of western Ukraine should be destroyed, and this region turned into a buffer on the border with the West. They also believed that one or two million Ukrainians should be deported to Siberia, and that Ukrainian prisoners of war should be used to build transport routes between Russia's Arctic coastline with Asian countries to the South.

Ivan Timofeev, director general of the Kremlin-linked Russian International Affairs Council, noted that Karaganov's approach "underestimates the Western elites' determination to climb the escalation ladder with Russia, and, if necessary, ahead of it" and "overlooks the possibly catastrophic consequences for Russia itself."

Karaganov was a host for the June 2024 St. Petersburg International Economic Forum where he shared the stage with Vladimir Putin and other global leaders like Emmerson Mnangagwa.

In July 2025, Karaganov proposed that Russia adopt a state ideology that would be taught to Russian children in schools. The core of Russian state ideology would be devotion to the state and its leader. He dismissed democracy as harmful to Russia, stating, "Democracy is ineffective as a form of governance for complex societies. It can exist only under favorable external conditions, in the absence of external threats and powerful rivals." He described Russia as an "Asian empire" in the company of China and India. Karaganov characterized Russians as a "God-bearing people" with a mission to protect "the best in humanity, world peace, freedom for all countries and peoples, and their diversity, variety, and multiculturalism." He criticized Western nations for "individualism" and the "cult of consumerism".

== Personal life ==
Karaganov has been barred from entering the EU after his calls to use nuclear weapons.

== See also ==
- Eurasianism
- Revanchism
- Ruscism
- Russian imperialism
- Russian nationalism
- Russian irredentism
- Russia–Ukraine relations
