= Nuclear imperialism =

Use of nuclear technology to exert imperial dominance

Nuclear imperialism is a phrase that describes an intersection of imperialism and nuclear weapons technology. It can have multiple meanings:

- Domination of a state or indigenous people for nuclear technology purposes, such as uranium mining or nuclear weapons testing
- Domination of one state by another via nuclear blackmail

== In nuclear technology purposes ==
The phrase has been extensively applied to the nuclear weapons testing, especially of multi-megaton, high-fallout thermonuclear weapons in the Pacific carried out by the United States, Britain, and France. The United States tested at the Pacific Proving Grounds, especially Bikini Atoll, Britain tested at Malden Island and Kiritimati, and France tested in French Polynesia. This manifested as a disregard for the health of native Pacific Islanders, leading to improper evacuation procedures, exposing them to a range of radiation poisoning effects, especially chronic radiation syndrome. This caused cancers, cataracts, miscarriages, stillbirths, and fatal birth defects. This has been characterized as a form of slow violence. Evidence also indicates islanders were used for non-consensual human subject research on the effects of radiation. One particular disaster was the US Castle Bravo test, which also contaminated the Japanese fishing vessel Daigo Fukuryū Maru.

The phrase is also applied to the Pan-African movement's responses to French nuclear testing in Algeria, which intersected with the Algerian War of Independence. American activists including Bayard Rustin and Bill Sutherland worked with the newly independent Ghana led by Kwame Nkrumah, in criticizing France's tests in the Sahara that were characterized as a "Hiroshima in Africa".

== In nuclear blackmail ==
The phrase is also applied to situations where a state considers or threatens use of nuclear weapons against an opponent without nuclear weapons. It has been applied to nuclear attacks considered by the United States during early stages of the Cold War in Asia, particularly the Korean War, the First Indochina War, the First Taiwan Strait Crisis.

== See also ==
- Nuclear blackmail
- Korean War § U.S. threat of atomic warfare
- Nuclear close calls
- Castle Bravo
- Human radiation experiments
- Campaign for Nuclear Disarmament
- Sinking of the Rainbow Warrior
- Semipalatinsk Test Site
