= Nuclear risk during the Russo-Ukrainian war (2022–present) =

Risk of nuclear conflict during the Russo-Ukrainian war

During the Russo-Ukrainian war, several senior Russian politicians, including President Vladimir Putin, former president and prime minister Dmitry Medvedev, and Foreign Minister Sergey Lavrov, have made a number of statements widely seen as nuclear blackmail. The possibility of Russia using tactical nuclear weapons, and the risk of broader nuclear escalation, has been widely discussed by commentators and in the media. US scholars have called the invasion "the type of scenario most likely to trigger a nuclear war in Europe". On the other hand, British historian Lawrence Freedman argued the risk was low: "In Putin's mind, nuclear use is best kept for the most extreme contingencies when the state faces an existential threat."

Some of the Russian government's "red lines" have been crossed without nuclear response. For example, the June 2025 Operation Spiderweb coordinated drone attack by Ukraine on Russia's strategic bomber force, which is in use for conventional attacks against Ukraine.

In October 2022, Russian officials accused Ukraine of preparing a radiological weapon in the form of a dirty bomb. An International Atomic Energy Agency investigation refuted the claim. US officials feared Russia would use the claims or a false flag attack to establish pretext for a nuclear strike on Ukraine.

In March 2023, Putin announced plans to station tactical nuclear weapons in Belarus, via Iskander short-range ballistic missiles, and gravity bombs for Su-25 aircraft. This was possibly completed in late 2024.

On November 21, 2024, following an announcement about changes to its nuclear doctrine, Russia fired an Oreshnik ballistic missile targeting the Pivdenmash (Yuzhmash) aerospace factory in Dnipro, Ukraine. This was the first use of a typically nuclear-armed multiple independently targetable reentry vehicle in combat. It was partly in response to a US policy allowing ATACMS and Storm Shadow use for attacks in Russia.

In addition to nuclear weapons threats, the Russian occupation of the Zaporizhzhia Nuclear Power Plant has led to a crisis over the safety of the plant and the risk of a nuclear disaster.

== Occupation of Chernobyl by Russian forces ==
The Chernobyl Exclusion Zone was the site of fighting between Russian and Ukrainian forces during the Battle of Chernobyl as part of the Russian invasion of Ukraine. On 24 February 2022, Russian forces captured the plant. The resulting activity reportedly led to a 20-fold increase of detected radiation levels in the area due to disturbance of contaminated soil. On 9 March 2022, there was a power cut at the plant itself. No radiation leaks were reported as of 9 March 2022. However, Ukrainian authorities reported that there was a risk of a radiation leak due to spent fuel coolant being unable to circulate properly.

On 30 March 2022, Russian forces formally handed control of the plant back to its employees, and most occupying forces withdrew. Ukrainian National Guard personnel were moved to Belarus as prisoners of war. On 2 April 2022, Ukrainian media reported that the flag of Ukraine was raised at the plant.

According to Chernobyl operator Energoatom, Russian troops had dug trenches in the most contaminated part of the Chernobyl exclusion zone, receiving "significant doses" of radiation. BBC News mentioned unconfirmed reports that some were being treated in Belarus. The equipment of Chernobyl nuclear power plant and radioactive materials were looted by Russian forces.

== Russian nuclear blackmail ==
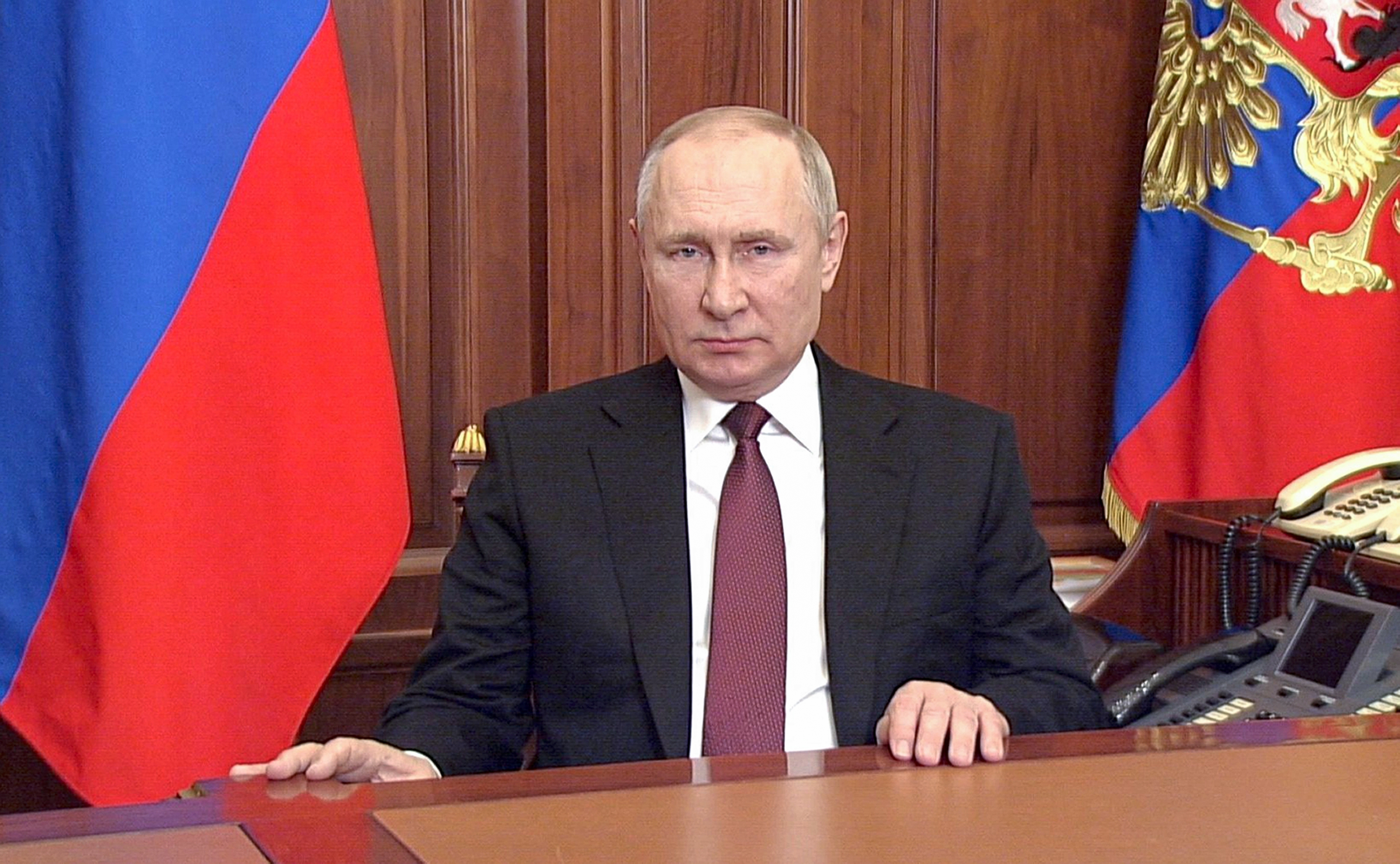
Russian president Vladimir Putin announcing the invasion on 24 February 2022

=== 2022 ===
Late in the evening of 27 February 2022, three days after the launch of the Russian invasion, President Putin ordered Russia's nuclear forces to go into a "special mode of combat duty", a state of high alert.

On 20 April 2022, Russia carried out its first test launch of the RS-28 Sarmat, a new long-range intercontinental ballistic missile (ICBM). Putin said the new missile could defeat any missile defences, and that it should cause countries threatening Russia to "think twice". The United States Department of Defense confirmed that Russia had properly notified the U.S. about the launch in advance, pursuant to New START, and that the U.S. considered the launch to be a routine test and not a threat.

On 24 April, in apparent response to US secretary of state Antony Blinken's meeting with Zelenskyy in Kyiv on 23 April, Russian foreign minister Sergey Lavrov stated that further support of Ukraine could cause tensions which could potentially lead to a World War III scenario involving Russia's full arsenal of weapons. The day after Lavrov's comments, CNBC reported that US secretary Lloyd Austin referred to Russia's nuclear war rhetoric as being "dangerous and unhelpful".

In an apparent response to Germany deploying armed tanks to Ukraine, Putin announced in Russia's main legislative assembly that Russia would respond to any combative military provocation from outside of Ukraine with prompt peremptory action possible only with Russia's unique arsenal of nuclear weapons. Pentagon Press secretary John Kirby called Putin's assertion of nuclear potency contrary to the process of the peaceful resolution of the current conflict in Ukraine.

On 29 May, after repudiating accusations made against Russia regarding atrocities in Bucha, the Russian ambassador to the UK, Andrei Kelin, said in an interview with the BBC that he did not believe Russia would use tactical nuclear weapons in Ukraine until Russian sovereignty was found to be in peril.

The state-owned Russian television channel Russia-1 has been noted for the frequency with which its presenters propose Russian nuclear attack on Western countries, including the United Kingdom and United States of America.

==== Potential Russian tactical strike ====
After a number of successful Ukrainian counteroffensive operations, a number of Russian units were in danger of being surrounded and destroyed. US intelligence started to receive information that Russia began to think about a potential tactical nuclear strike on Ukraine.

On 21 September, while announcing a partial mobilization of conscripts, Putin said that Russia "will use all the means at our disposal" – widely interpreted as a threat to use nuclear weapons – to defend the country’s territory. He warned that his threat was "not a bluff", baselessly accused NATO of "nuclear blackmail" and of threatening to use nuclear weapons against Russia, and said Russia's nuclear weapons were more advanced than NATO's. Russian Foreign Minister Sergey Lavrov did not rule out the use of nuclear weapons to defend annexed Ukrainian territories. Several days later, former Russian president and Putin ally Dmitry Medvedev made a more explicit threat of a nuclear strike against Ukraine.

On 1 October, Ramzan Kadyrov, head of the Chechen Republic, called on Russia to use low-yield nuclear weapons in Ukraine in response to Russia losing the strategically important Ukrainian town of Lyman, the first prominent Russian official to directly call for the use of nuclear weapons. In response to Kadyrov's comments, Kremlin press secretary Dmitry Peskov said that the use of nuclear weapons would be determined by Russian military doctrine and not by emotions.

Later in October, Russian officials, including Russian defense minister Sergei Shoigu, began accusing Ukraine of preparing to use a radioactive dirty bomb on Ukrainian territory, prompting concerns in the West that Russia itself might be planning to use a dirty bomb and blame it on Ukraine. The allegations were additionally communicated in phone calls to Western officials by two top Russian officials. On 24 October, John Kirby stated that there was no evidence Russia was preparing a dirty bomb strike. A tweet by the Russian Ministry of Defence, purportedly showing evidence of a Ukrainian dirty bomb in production, was debunked as a collection of old and unrelated photos. At Ukraine's request, the United Nations sent an IAEA investigation to Ukraine, which found no evidence of a dirty bomb being developed or any other undeclared nuclear activity. US feared that those allegations by Russia may be a confirmation of it preparing for a nuclear strike on Ukraine, using dirty bomb allegations or a false flag attack as a pretext.

The US, as reported by CNN, has "prepared 'rigorously' for potential Russian nuclear strike in Ukraine". It also engaged US diplomats, as well as asked other countries, namely China and India, to engage diplomatically to persuade Russia to avoid nuclear escalation.

=== 2023 ===
On 22 January 2023, Vyacheslav Volodin, the speaker of the Duma, wrote on Telegram that "If Washington and NATO countries supply weapons that will be used to strike civilian cities and attempt to seize our territories, as they threaten, this will lead to retaliatory measures using more powerful weapons," and "Arguments that the nuclear powers have not previously used weapons of mass destruction in local conflicts are untenable. Because these states did not face a situation where there was a threat to the security of their citizens and the territorial integrity of the country." In the same month, Russia repeatedly accused Ukraine of storing its military equipment in the nuclear power plants under its control. The IAEA has permanent observers in all Ukrainian plants since 2022, and on 24 January 2023, the agency issued a statement that it had found no military equipment in the plants.

On 21 February 2023, during a Presidential Address to the Federal Assembly, Putin announced that Russia would be suspending its participation in New START, the last remaining nuclear weapons treaty between Russia and the United States. He stated, "[Russia] is not withdrawing from the treaty but is suspending its participation." On 26 February 2023, to state-owned television channel Russia-1, Putin said that Russia had no choice but to "take into account" the nuclear capabilities of NATO, and that the West wanted to "liquidate" Russia. Russia said it would continue informing the US on planned launches of intercontinental and submarine-launched ballistic missiles under the 1988 Ballistic Missile Launch Notification Agreement.

On 25 March 2023, Putin announced plans to install Russian tactical nuclear weapons in Belarus. On 29 March, Russia's Defense Ministry announced that it would conduct a nuclear missile drill, which includes the testing of nuclear-tipped RS-24 Yars missiles.

In March 2023, Russian journalist Dmitry Muratov, who won the Nobel Peace Prize in 2021, warned that Russian state propaganda "is preparing people to think that nuclear war is not a bad thing. On TV channels here, nuclear war and nuclear weapons are promoted as if they're advertising pet food."

In June 2023, Russian political scientist Sergey Karaganov called for the use of nuclear weapons by Russia against NATO member states in Europe, saying that "we will have to hit a bunch of targets in a number of countries in order to bring those who have lost their mind to reason."

A study by RAND Corporation, published in September 2023, concluded, that Russian military losses- at the level which may threaten the security of Putin's regime- would provide the most likely trigger for nuclear use. However, they also pointed out three primary factors restraining Putin: concern about NATO military capabilities, concern for international reactions including losing China's support, and belief that his goals are achievable without nuclear escalation.

=== 2024 ===
FIRMS imagery of the 20 and 21 September fire from the test failure at Plesetsk Cosmodrome

Leaked documents seen by the Financial Times in 2024 described a threshold for the country's use of tactical nuclear weapons that is lower than Russia had previously disclosed. Alexander Gabuev, director of the Carnegie Russia Eurasia Centre in Berlin told the FT: "This is the first time that we have seen documents like this reported in the public domain […] They show that the operational threshold for using nuclear weapons is pretty low if the desired result can’t be achieved through conventional means."

On or around 20 September, Russia tested its newest ICBM, the RS-28 Sarmat in an apparent attempt at nuclear blackmail. The test failed and destroyed the launch silo and its surrounding facilities.

On 25 September, Putin warned the West that if attacked with conventional weapons Russia would consider a nuclear retaliation. Putin went on to threaten nuclear powers that if they supported another country's attack on Russia, then they would be considered participants in such an aggression. Russia and the United States are the world's biggest nuclear powers, holding about 88% of the world's nuclear weapons. Experts said Putin's announcement was aimed at dissuading the United States, the United Kingdom, and France from allowing Ukraine to use Western-supplied long-range missiles such as the Storm Shadow and ATACMS in strikes against Russia. Two days later, Belarusian President and close ally of Russia Alexander Lukashenko warned that Belarus will use nuclear weapons if attacked by the West.

On 19 November 2024 Putin signed a decree allowing Russia to use nuclear weapons in response to conventional attacks by a non-nuclear state supported by a nuclear power, which also included a dramatic change in the trigger from "existential threat" to "critical threat to Russia's sovereignty or territory".

According to this document, Russian nuclear deterrence policy seeks to maintain nuclear forces at a "sufficient" level, "guarantees protection of national sovereignty and territorial integrity," deters aggression, and enables escalation management, as well as the "termination" of adversary "military actions" on conditions "acceptable" to Russia. The document adds that the Russian President could authorize nuclear weapons employment in the following scenarios:

1. "the receipt of reliable data" about a ballistic missile attack against Russian or allied territory,
2. the use by an adversary of "nuclear and other weapons of mass destruction" against Russia or an ally,
3. "adversary actions" on "government or military" targets that could affect Russia's ability to retaliate with nuclear weapons,
4. a conventional "aggression against" Russia and (or) Belarus that "poses a critical threat to their sovereignty and (or) territorial integrity," and
5. "the receipt of reliable data" about a "mass start of aerospace attack means" and "their crossing of [Russia's] state border." The document also states that Russia considers "an aggression" by "any nonnuclear state, but with participation or with support from a nuclear state," a "joint attack" against Russia.

On 7 December, Russia and Belarus signed an agreement offering security guarantees to Belarus including nuclear security and the possible use of Russian nuclear weapons to repel aggressions. Two days later Belarusian President Lukashenko confirmed the presence of Russian nuclear weapons in Belarus.

=== 2025 ===
On 4 May in an interview to mark his 25 years of power in Russia, Putin remarked that "he hoped that there would be no need to use nuclear weapons" to bring the Russian invasion of Ukraine "to its logical conclusion".

On 31 July in response to US President Trump's warning to Russia Dmitry Medvedev made a nuclear threat referencing the Soviet era dead hand automatized, second strike system.

=== 2026 ===
On 24 February, the fourth anniversary since the invasion, the Russian Foreign Intelligence Service accused France and the United Kingdom of preparing to supply Ukraine with a nuclear weapon, with the Russian foreign ministry warning that such a move would lead to a direct conflict between NATO states and Russia.

== International reactions to threats of using nuclear weapons ==
=== 2022 ===
On 14 April 2022, The New York Times reported comments by CIA director William Burns, who said "potential desperation" could lead President Putin to order the use of tactical nuclear weapons.

On 4 May, the US Senate held the "Hearing on Nuclear Readiness Amid Russia-Ukraine War" where Admiral Charles A. Richard stated that current nuclear triad defence capabilities in the US were operating at a minimal acceptable level of operational capacity, with Russian stockpiles and Chinese stockpiles currently larger than those of the US. On 6 May, Russian foreign ministry spokesman Alexei Zaitsev stated that Russia would not use nuclear weapons in Ukraine, describing their use as "not applicable to the Russian 'special military operation'".

On 23 May, Russian diplomat Boris Bondarev resigned from his position and issued a critique of the invasion, singling out Lavrov's position on the potential use of Russian nuclear arms: "In 18 years, he (Lavrov) went from a professional and educated intellectual ... to a person who constantly broadcasts conflicting statements and threatens the world with nuclear weapons!" Japan's Prime Minister Fumio Kishida stated, that Japan would support further international discussion about Russia and its nuclear arms threats during the invasion of Ukraine at the upcoming nuclear non-proliferation meeting taking place next August. On 20 June, the "Conference on the Humanitarian Impact of Nuclear Weapons" opened in Vienna to discuss potential catastrophic effects of nuclear arms, amid rising fears over Russia's possible use of nuclear weapons during the 2022 invasion of Ukraine.

On 1 July, during a visit by Lavrov to Belarus, Belarusian president Alexander Lukashenko indicated support for Moscow to use nuclear weapons against the broad threats of Western hegemony over Russia and its allies demonstrated during the conflict in Ukraine.

On 13 August, in an interview with the BBC, Jim Hockenhull, the outgoing head of UK Military Intelligence, said he considered the possibility of Russia imminently using nuclear weapons to be "unlikely".

In a September 2022 interview, U.S. President Joe Biden was asked what consequences would ensue for Russian use of nuclear weapons. Biden responded: "You think I would tell you if I knew exactly what it would be? Of course, I'm not gonna tell you. It'll be consequential... They'll become more of a pariah in the world than they ever have been. And depending on the extent of what they do will determine what response would occur." On 26 September, national security advisor Jake Sullivan spoke of "catastrophic consequences" if Russia used nuclear weapons, adding that "in private channels we have spelled out in greater detail (to Russia) exactly what that would mean". Secretary of State Antony Blinken similarly referred to a "catastrophic" U.S. response.

NATO Secretary-General Jens Stoltenberg stated on 21 September that NATO would "not engage in that same kind of reckless and dangerous nuclear rhetoric as President Putin". On 4 October, British foreign minister James Cleverly said any Russian use of nuclear weapons would lead to consequences. Minister of Foreign Affairs of Poland Zbigniew Rau has stated a NATO response should be "devastating", but non-nuclear. Rau also stated on 5 October that he has asked for the U.S. to base nuclear weapons on Polish territory; this may have been partly in response to Russia's recent nuclear threat and partly in response to the prospect of Russia basing nuclear weapons in Belarus.

In September 2022, a Ukrainian sea drone attack on the Crimean Sevastopol Naval Base failed when the satellite Internet service Starlink, used for Ukrainian communications, didn't work in the target area. Elon Musk, CEO of Starlink, had denied Ukraine's request to turn on Starlink coverage up to Crimea. He had been warned by Russian ambassador to the US Anatoly Antonov that an attack on Crimea would be met with a nuclear response from Russia and feared that an attack on Crimea could escalate the conflict to WW3. Anne Applebaum wrote in The Atlantic that Musk's influence had been played by Russian disinformation.

On 6 October 2022, during a speech at a private fundraiser in New York City, Biden said that for the "[f]irst time since the Cuban Missile Crisis, we have a direct threat of the use of the nuclear weapon if, in fact, things continue down the path they've been going... Think about it: We have not faced the prospect of Armageddon since Kennedy and the Cuban Missile Crisis. We've got a guy I know fairly well; his name is Vladimir Putin. I spent a fair amount of time with him. He is not joking when he talks about the potential use of tactical and nuclear weapons, or biological or chemical weapons, because his military is, you might say, significantly underperforming... I don't think there’s any such thing as an ability to easily [use] a tactical nuclear weapon and not end up with Armageddon." According to the Associated Press, Biden sometimes speaks in an unguarded way, using only rough notes, at such private fundraisers; White House Press Secretary Karine Jean-Pierre later said that Biden's comments were not based on new intelligence or information. In an interview with CNN's Jake Tapper that aired on 11 October 2022, Biden said that he did not believe Putin would ultimately resort to deploying nuclear weapons in Ukraine, but criticized Putin's statements on the topic as "irresponsible".

In an interview with the BBC on 11 October 2022, GCHQ Director Jeremy Fleming said the agency had seen no indications that Russia was preparing for the use of a tactical nuclear weapon. Later, in a statement released on 18 October, Major General Kyrylo Budanov, Chief of the Main Directorate of Intelligence of Ukraine's Ministry of Defense, said he did not believe Russia would use nuclear weapons in Ukraine.

On October 22, 2022 a former CIA director David Petraeus told ABC News, that "the use of nuclear weapons by Russia in Ukraine... would not be a situation triggering the alliance’s Article 5, which calls for a collective defense. That is because Ukraine is not part of NATO".

=== 2023 ===
On 24 January 2023, the Bulletin of the Atomic Scientists adjusted its Doomsday Clock to 90 seconds to midnight, a 10-second advancement from the Clock's previous time setting in 2020. The organization cited increasing risk of nuclear escalation stemming from Russia's invasion of Ukraine as a major factor in the adjustment.

During a press briefing at the White House on 25 January 2023, John Kirby, Coordinator for Strategic Communications for the United States National Security Council, said that the United States does not "have any indication that Mr. Putin has any intention to use weapons of mass destruction - let alone nuclear weapons, tactical or otherwise." Kirby also said the United States has seen "absolutely no indications that Mr. Putin has designs on striking NATO territory."

=== 2024 ===
On 26 February 2024, after meeting with several other European heads of state in Paris to discuss support for Ukraine, French President Emmanuel Macron declined to rule out the possibility of deploying Western military personnel in Ukraine, saying that "anything is possible" to help Ukraine win the war. On 29 February, during his annual Presidential Address to the Federal Assembly, Putin warned that more direct Western intervention in the war would result in a nuclear conflict; he stated that "we [Russia] also have the weapons that can strike targets on their territory, and what they are now suggesting and scaring the world with, all that raises the real threat of a nuclear conflict that will mean the destruction of our civilization." In an interview with El País published on 1 March, Deputy Secretary General of NATO Mircea Geoană said that the alliance did "not see any imminent threat of Russia using [nuclear] weapons," but decried Putin's statements as "very dangerous, because they erode trust"; he also affirmed that "we at NATO have no intention or plans to deploy troops to Ukraine."

=== 2025 ===
On 1 August 2025, President Donald Trump ordered the deployment of two United States Navy nuclear submarines "in the appropriate regions" in response to statements made by Dmitry Medvedev regarding Trump's previously-stated deadline for ending the war in Ukraine.

== Analysis of nuclear blackmail ==
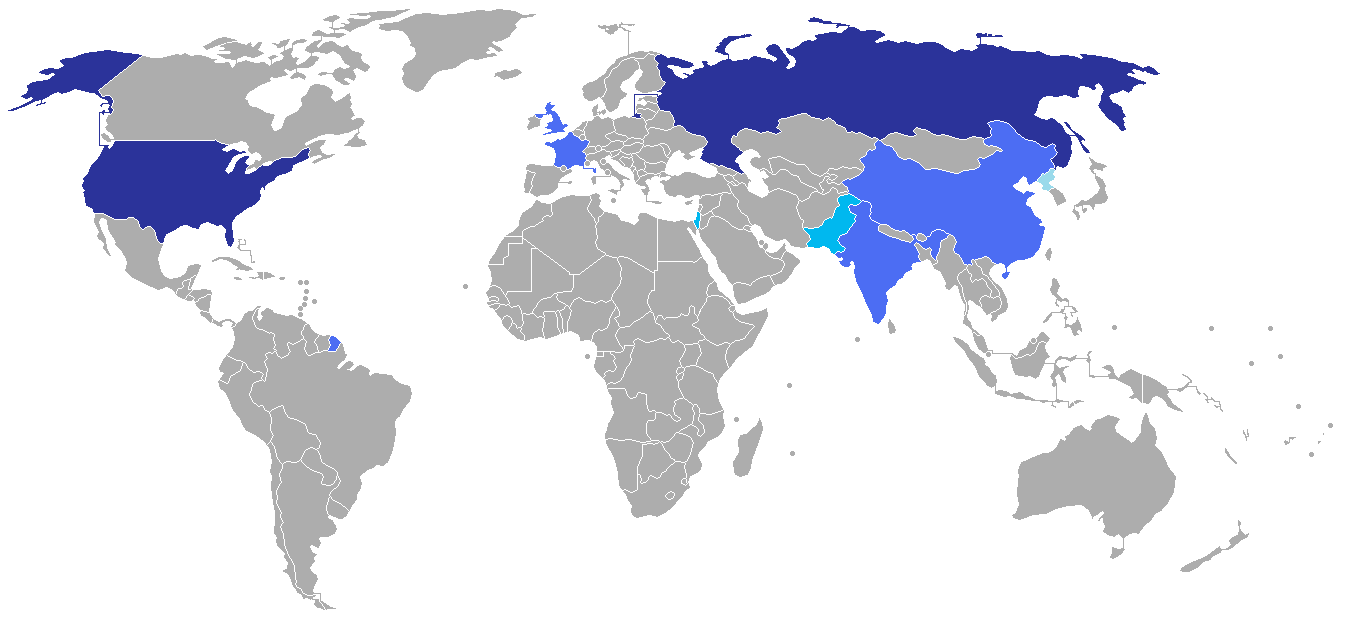
Large nuclear weapons stockpile with global range (dark blue)

In April 2022, American political activist Daniel Ellsberg compared Vladimir Putin's nuclear threats to Richard Nixon’s self-proclaimed "madman strategy".

Eric Schlosser, writing for The Atlantic magazine on 22 June 2022, stated that the nuclear saber-rattling by Russia during the invasion appeared to suggest the most probable uses of nuclear weapons would be:

1. A high-altitude explosion over the Black Sea, intended not to cause casualties, but to be a show of force and a threat of possible escalation. For example, a military expert Mark Cancian from CSIS suggested the possibility of detonating high in the atmosphere to produce an electromagnetic pulse and knock out electronic equipment.
2. A decapitation strike that would involve using a nuclear bunker buster against Volodymyr Zelensky and top military officials in Ukraine.
3. A nuclear attack on a military target designed to minimize civilian casualties.
4. A nuclear attack on a major Ukrainian city, similar to the atomic bombings of Hiroshima and Nagasaki, intended to cause widespread panic and force a surrender.

On 7 September, The Washington Post reported that the Russian high military command had published an analysis saying that tactical nuclear arms remained a viable option for use against Ukraine, quoting Ukrainian commander in chief Valeriy Zaluzhnyi as stating: "There is a direct threat of the use, under certain circumstances, of tactical nuclear weapons by the Russian Armed Forces... It is also impossible to completely rule out the possibility of the direct involvement of the world’s leading countries in a ‘limited’ nuclear conflict, in which the prospect of World War III is already directly visible."

Hans M. Kristensen, director of the Nuclear Information Project at the Federation of American Scientists, said that "if you start detonating nuclear weapons in the area you potentially get radioactive fallout that you can't control — it could rain over your own troops as well, so it might not be an advantage to do that in the field." He also said that "the big problem is with people both inside the Russian system, but also in the public in general, if they think about tactical nuclear weapons as something small; something less severe or something almost okay." On 1 October 2022, the Institute for the Study of War argued that Russian soldiers are "almost certainly incapable of operating on a nuclear battlefield", owing to their disorganization, and that this inability to advance through a nuclear environment reduces the likelihood of Russian tactical nuclear weapons use in the first place.

In a 2 October 2022 analysis, The Jerusalem Post stated "Most experts do not think that Russian President Vladimir Putin will actually use nuclear weapons in Ukraine at the end of the day, but the number of those who think he will or might is growing." Different analysts hypothesized different initial Western responses, depending in part on the nature of the initial Russian nuclear attack on Ukraine. Hypothetical initial responses included: increased sanctions, a conventional assault on Russian forces in Ukraine, a nuclear attack on Russian forces in Ukraine, or a nuclear attack on Belarus. Their analysis added that, even if Russia used a nuclear weapon, "the likelihood is still no" that it would lead to a full nuclear war. Mark Cancian has suggested increased weapons shipments, including previously restricted weapons like NATO aircraft, advanced anti-missile batteries, and ATACMS long-range missiles.

In January 2023, Graham Allison, writing for Time, presented a seven-point summary of Putin's hypothetical intention to deploy tactical nuclear weapons in Ukraine. Allison stated that:

1. There is a "rational" basis for Putin to apply limited nuclear weapons based on the older historical precedent set by Truman in WWII against Japan.
2. Putin has evaluated the risks of American retaliation for the use of tactical nuclear weapons and America's response that it would cause "catastrophic consequences" for Russia, the same as it would have during the height of the Cold War.
3. The potential loss of face for Putin before the Russian people in the case that Zelenskyy is successful in repelling further Russian occupational gains might provide an incentive for Putin to expand his theater of warfare to include tactical nuclear weapons against Ukraine.
4. Putin does consider it politically justified to apply first-use of tactical nuclear weapons based on the standing Russian military doctrine called "escalate to de-escalate", in order to make adversarial forces stand down.
5. Putin is aware of Biden's assertion that U.S. forces "will not fight World War III for Ukraine", even though Biden is aware of America's previous commitments to the military strategy of mutually assured destruction.
6. Reagan's doctrine that a "nuclear war cannot be won and must never be fought" is part of America's political legacy as well, which appears relevant to Biden's perspective of which Putin is aware.
7. Putin is also aware of the Cold War doctrine developed in previous generations that Soviet adversaries would be met with "determined effort" by U.S. military forces in case of Soviet military belligerence while conducting military operations.

== Crisis at nuclear plants ==
=== Zaporizhzhia Nuclear Plant crisis ===
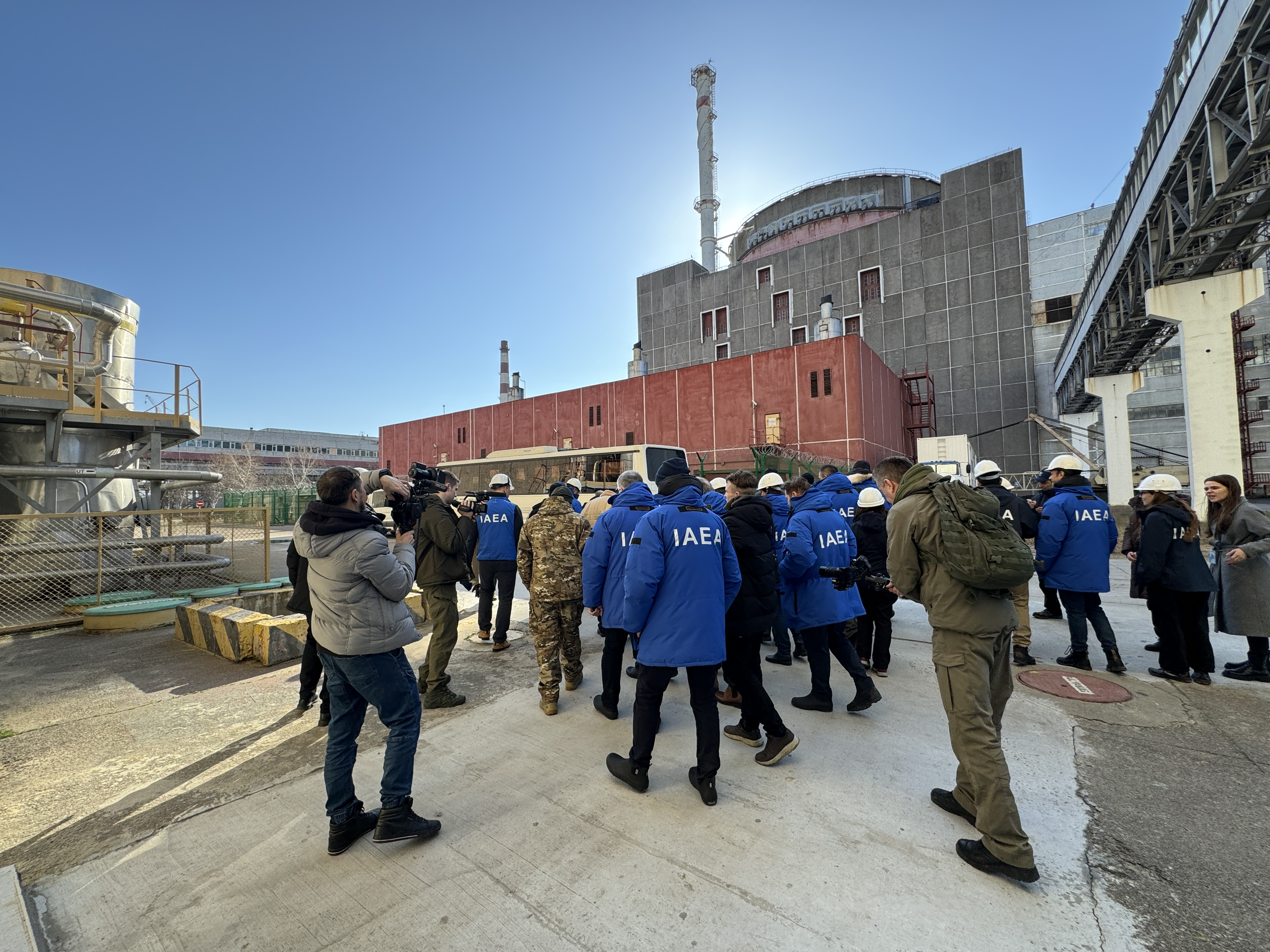
Rafael Grossi and IAEA mission team members at the Zaporizhzhia Nuclear Power Plant on 7 February 2024

At the beginning of the 2022 Russian invasion of Ukraine, during the Battle of Enerhodar on 4 March 2022, Zaporizhzhia Nuclear Power Plant (ZNPP), the largest nuclear power plant in Europe, was attacked and occupied by Russian forces. It was the first full-scale military attack and occupation of an operational nuclear power plant in history. It has become the center of an ongoing nuclear safety crisis, described by Ukraine as an act of nuclear terrorism by Russia.

Since September 2022, all six reactors have been placed in various states of shutdown, the same month Russia annexed the region in a disputed referendum. In 2025, Russia confirmed its long-term plans for Rosatom to operate the plant, currently operated by Ukrainian Energoatom staff, and in connection to the Russian power grid. Ukrainian forces have made multiple attempts to recapture the plant, and both sides blame each other for direct and indirect attacks on it. ZNPP has seen destruction of its infrastructure via shelling and damage to its power lines. The future of the plant's safety and electricity production is a significant point in the peace negotiations of the war.

Ukrainian authorities call the crisis the largest situation of its kind in history. Experts vary on whether a potential disaster may exceed the scale of previous disasters at nuclear power plants. According to a report by the International Atomic Energy Agency (IAEA), "The situation in Ukraine is unprecedented. It is the first time a military conflict has occurred amid the facilities of a large, established nuclear power program." Nuclear safety expert Attila Aszódi said that an event similar in type and scale to the Chernobyl disaster is technically and physically not possible in the Zaporizhzhia plant, while calling for urgent steps to ensure the safety of the plant. The Bellona Foundation called the crisis "something the world nuclear energy community never thought it would see — and thus never prepared for."

=== Kursk Nuclear Power Plant ===
The IAEA's Director General Rafael Grossi urged both Russia and Ukraine to exercise "maximum restraint" to avoid an accident at the Kursk Nuclear Power Plant during the August 2024 Kursk Oblast incursion, following reports of "significant military activity" near the facility.

In August 2025, a fire broke out at Kursk Nuclear power plant, allegedly due to a Ukrainian drone strike. The fire was extinguished, with no injuries or excess radiation reported. The Ukrainian government declined to comment on the strike.

=== Chernobyl Nuclear Power Plant ===
On 14 February 2025, an unmanned aerial vehicle hit the New Safe Confinement structure at the Chernobyl Nuclear Power Plant in Ukraine. The attack resulted in significant damage to the protective shelter, but did not lead to increased radiation levels in the surrounding area. Ukrainian President Volodymyr Zelenskyy said that a Russian combat drone carrying a "high-explosive warhead" had struck the structure. Russia denied the allegations, instead suggesting that Ukrainian officials made the claim to disrupt peace negotiations.

== Russian nuclear deterrence infrastructure ==
In May 2024, Ukrainian drones attacked two early-warning long-range Voronezh radars, one in Armavir, southern Russia and one near Orsk in Russia's Orenburg Oblast. An anonymous U.S. official said the United States "is concerned about Ukraine's recent strikes against Russian ballistic missile early-warning sites."

== See also ==
- Madman theory
- Nuclear blackmail
- Atomic bombings of Hiroshima and Nagasaki
- Cuban Missile Crisis
- China's final warning
- Disinformation in the Russian invasion of Ukraine
- Media portrayal of the Russo-Ukrainian War
- Mutual assured destruction
- Nuclear terrorism
- Nuclear warfare
- Global catastrophe scenarios
- Planned Soviet nuclear strike on China in 1969
- Russia and weapons of mass destruction
- World War III
