= Faculty of World Economy and International Affairs =

The Faculty of World Economy and International Affairs is a Faculty group at the Higher School of Economics in Russia. It was established in 2006 and increased the scope of the Faculty of World Economy, which was founded in 2002.

== Structure ==
One of the features of the Faculty is the matrix approach in the course of studies, which includes economic and political specialisation on different countries and regions, as well as the so-called “problem” specialisation.

The Faculty includes five departments:

- School of World Economy
- School of International Affairs
- School of Asian Studies
- Institute of Trade Policy
- Centre for Comprehensive European and International Studies (CCEIS)

== Areas of Studies ==
The Faculty focuses on the range of theoretical and practical courses. The studies is divided into different programs:

- Undergraduate Programme
- Masters Programme

Undergraduate Programme can be divided into the following areas of focus:

- World Economy
- International Affairs
- Asian and African Studies
- HSE and University of London Parallel Degree Programme in International Relation
- HSE and Kyung Hee University Double Degree Programme in Economics and Politics in Asia

Master’s programmes:

Specializations within the World Economy Programme:

- World Economy
- Master of International Business
- International Trade Policy

Specializations within the International Affairs and European Studies:

- International Relations in Eurasia
- International Relations: European and Asian Studies

Specializations within the Asian and African Studies:

- Socioeconomic and Political Development of Modern Asia

== Special Features ==
Students have a wide range of languages to choose from in their curriculum along with English, which is compulsory for all students: German, French, Spanish, Portuguese, Italian, Chinese, Japanese, Arabic.

Faculty of World Economics and International Affairs is very special in its attitude to English. First of all, English is among the list of the obligatory written entrance exams and at the end of the studies students’ level of the language can be identified as Advanced. Secondly, all Faculty’s students learn English, regardless of the foreign language they learned previously. Unlike other Faculties of the HSE where students have English classes only for two years, the Faculty of World Economics and International Affairs provides its students with an opportunity to learn languages for four years with the amount of classes accounting for 914 hours, which is equivalent to the level of the Moscow State Linguistic University.

A new objective for the English department is to train students for international exams in English. All students will take an international exam after finishing their English studies. The schools of HSE have two Exams: IELTS and BEC which are considered to be important for academic and professional progress.

== Personalities ==
The Dean of the Faculty is Sergey Karaganov.
