= Angus Roxburgh =

English journalist (born 1954)

- Born: 1954 (age 71–72)
- Occupations: Journalist, Singer-songwriter
- Notable credit: BBC News
- Website: http://www.angusroxburgh.com

Angus Roxburgh (born 1954) is a British journalist, broadcaster, former external PR consultant to the Russian government, and singer-songwriter.

== Education and early career ==
Born in Scarborough, North Riding of Yorkshire, England, and raised in Scotland, Roxburgh studied Russian and German at the universities of Aberdeen and Zurich. After graduation, he taught Russian at Aberdeen University and then worked as a translator for Progress Publishers in Moscow. He wrote a book about the Soviet media, titled Pravda: Inside the Soviet News Machine.

== Journalism ==
In 1984, Angus Roxburgh began work as a Russian monitor at the BBC Monitoring Service, based in Caversham, England. In 1986, he moved to the BBC Russian Service in London as a script writer.

In April 1987, he started working as a sub-editor on The Guardian newspaper, and in October 1987 became Moscow Correspondent of The Sunday Times. In June 1989, he was expelled in a tit-for-tat expulsion after a group of Soviet spies was deported from London. From 1989 to 1990, Roxburgh covered the fall of communism in eastern Europe for The Sunday Correspondent newspaper.

In 1990–1991, he worked as consultant on the BBC television documentary series, The Second Russian Revolution, and wrote a book of the same name. He covered the August 1991 coup against Soviet leader Mikhail Gorbachev for The Guardian.

From 1992, Roxburgh was the BBC's Moscow Correspondent, and, from 1998, a BBC Europe Correspondent, based in Brussels. He wrote a book about the rise of the far-right in Europe entitled Preachers of Hate.

For three years from 2006, he worked for GPlus, a Brussels-based public relations company, as an external consultant to the Russian government.

From 2009 to 2011, he worked on a second BBC series about Russia, titled Putin, Russia and the West, and wrote a book, The Strongman: Vladimir Putin and the Struggle for Russia. In a February 2012 article in The Daily Telegraph, journalist Peter Oborne criticised Roxburgh's involvement in the programme, claiming, without citing any evidence, that it led to an imbalance in favour of Putin: "I have no doubt that [Roxburgh] is a man of integrity, but it is profoundly shocking that the BBC should even have considered using him, given the nature of his previous employment." The BBC issued a statement in response, which said: "Angus Roxburgh was once a PR advisor to the Kremlin. He was also a Sunday Times correspondent, and later the BBC’s Moscow correspondent. That is why he was hired: he helped secure interviews with key Kremlin insiders." The series was widely praised and won several prizes, including a Peabody award. Roxburgh's book, The Strongman, was shortlisted for International Affairs Book of the Year (2013) and was described by the Telegraph as "fair, nuanced and well-written."

He has made many radio documentaries, including one to mark the fiftieth anniversary of Yuri Gagarin's flight into space, The Communist Cosmos, for BBC Radio 4 in April 2011.

He works as a freelance writer and broadcaster. In 2017, he published Moscow Calling, a memoir of his experiences studying and working in Russia. Professor Archie Brown of Oxford University wrote that the book "illuminates discerningly the dramatic changes that have occurred in Russia over the past 40 years, many of which he witnessed at first hand". It was shortlisted for the Saltire Society Non-Fiction Book of the Year.

== Music ==
Angus Roxburgh plays guitar and piano, and began writing songs in his youth. His first album, Harmonies For One, was released in November 2011.

The Sunday Herald described it as "a collection of heartfelt, self-penned songs ... an emotive mix that touches on themes of love, heartache and social commentary".

== Bibliography ==
- Pravda: Inside the Soviet News Machine, Victor Gollancz, London, 1987.
- The Second Russian Revolution, BBC Books, London, 1991.
- Preachers of Hate, Gibson Square Books, London, 2003.
- The Strongman: Vladimir Putin and the Struggle for Russia, I.B.Tauris, London 2011. Roxburgh, Angus (November 2011). The Strongman: Vladimir Putin and the Struggle for Russia (1 ed.). London: I.B. Tauris.
- Moscow Calling: Memoirs of a Foreign Correspondent, Birlinn Ltd, Edinburgh, 2017
