= Council for Foreign and Defense Policy =

Russian think tank

- Совет по внешней и оборонной политике
- Formation: February 25, 1992; 34 years ago
- Headquarters: Malaya Ordynka Ulitsa 29
- Location: Moscow, Russia
- Official language: Russian
- Website: globalaffairs.ru

The Council for Foreign and Defense Policy (CFDP, SVOP) (Russian: Совет по внешней и оборонной политике) is a Russian Think Tank. It was formed on February 25, 1992. It has been called the "leading public foreign policy organization" for Russia.

Russian President Vladimir Putin regularly participates in the Council for Foreign and Defense Policy discussion club "Valdai".

== Projects ==
Source
Strategy for Russia
Military construction
Valdai International Discussion Club
World Political Economy Club
Russia and Europe
Russia-USA
Russia and the CIS
Russia and the Baltics
Russia and Asia
Russia-NATO
Russia and globalization
Russia and the World

== Ranking ==
In 2017 the Think Tanks and Civil Societies Program's, Global Go To Think Tank Index (GGTTI) ranking of think tanks, the Council for Foreign and Defense Policy is in a number of "sub-lists":

- 41st out of 135 under Top Foreign Policy and International Affairs Think Tanks.
- 58th of 110 under Top Think Tank by Area Research.
- 24th out of 75 "Best Government Affiliated Think Tanks"
- 107th out of 150 "Best Independent Think Tanks"

== Publications ==
- U.S. Russian Relations at the Turn of the Century: Reports of the Working Groups Organized by the Carnegie Endowment for International Peace, Washington and the Council on Foreign and Defense Policy. 2000.

== Chairman of the Presidium ==
- Alexey Georgievich Arbatov (ru:Арбатов, Алексей Георгиевич)
- Tatyana Viktorovna Borisova (ru:Борисова, Татьяна Викторовна)
- Vladimir Sergeevich Velichko (ru:Величко, Владимир Сергеевич)
- Sergey Alexandrovich Karaganov (ru:Караганов, Сергей Александрович)
- Yuri Georgievich Kobaladze (ru:Кобаладзе, Юрий Георгиевич)
- Evgeny Mikhailovich Kozhokin (ru:Кожокин, Евгений Михайлович)
- Fedor Alexandrovich Lukyanov 2014 AKA Fyodor Lukyanov. (ru:Лукьянов, Федор Александрович)
- Alexander Vyacheslavovich Losev (ru:Лосев, Александр Вячеславович)
- Viktor Nikolaevich Mironov (ru:Миронов, Виктор Николаевич)
- Nikolai Vasilievich Mikhailov (ru:Михайлов, Николай Васильевич)
- Sergei Ashotovich Mndoyants (ru:Мндоянц, Сергей Ашотович)
- Alexander Vladimirovich Mordovin (ru:Мордовин, Александр Владимирович)
- Vyacheslav Alekseevich Nikonov (ru:Никонов, Вячеслав Алексеевич)
- Alexey Konstantinovich Pushkov (ru:Пушков, Алексей Константинович)
- Vladimir Arsentievich Rubanov (ru:Рубанов, Владимир Арсентьевич)
- Vladimir Alexandrovich Ryzhkov (ru:Рыжков, Владимир Александрович)
- Garegin Ashotovich Tosunyan (ru:Тосунян, Гарегин Ашотович)
- Vitaly Tovievich Tretyakov (ru:Третьяков, Виталий Товиевич)
- Alexander Valeryanovich Tsalko (ru:Цалко, Александр Валерьянович)
- Igor Yurievich Yurgens (ru:Юргенс, Игорь Юрьевич)
