= Nuclear blackmail =

Military strategy

Nuclear blackmail is a form of nuclear strategy in which a state uses the threat of nuclear weapons to compel or deter an adversary's action.

== Definitions ==
Jeff McMahan argues that nuclear blackmail involves the use of coercive nuclear threats to compel a country to do what it is morally at liberty not to do or to deter a country from doing what it is morally at liberty to do. He notes that whether such a threat constitutes nuclear blackmail often depends on moral judgments about the action compelled or deterred—judgments that are likely to differ between opposing parties.

== History ==
=== By the United States ===
In 1953, during the final phase of active hostilities in the Korean War and the early period of the Eisenhower administration, U.S. Secretary of State John Foster Dulles conveyed messages of nuclear blackmail through indirect channels to the Communists—including the North Koreans, Chinese, and Soviets—warning to put the conflict to an end by using atomic bombs if no progress was made toward a negotiated settlement. Nuclear blackmail may have complicated rather than facilitated an armistice, because the Chinese refused to appease the Americans with their threats and the United Nations members such as the British did not support a full-scale escalation.

In January 1955, the Chinese government made the decision to develop the nuclear bomb as a result of the unpredictabilities brought by the nuclear blackmail levied by foreign powers, particularly the United States. On October 16, 1964, when China became a nuclear power, the Chinese government stated:

"The Chinese Government fully understands the good intentions of peace-loving countries and peoples in demanding an end to all nuclear tests. But more and more countries are coming to realize that the more exclusive the monopoly of nuclear weapons held by the U.S. imperialists and their partners, the greater the danger of a nuclear war. They are very arrogant when they have those weapons while you haven't. But when those who oppose them also have such weapons, they will not be so haughty, their policy of nuclear blackmail and nuclear threats will not be so effective, and the possibility of complete prohibition and thorough destruction of nuclear weapons will increase. We sincerely hope that a nuclear war will never break out. We are deeply convinced that, so long as all peace-loving countries and peoples make joint efforts and persist in the struggle, nuclear war can be prevented."

On April 7, 2026, US President Donald Trump posted to Truth Social that "a whole civilization will die tonight, never to be brought back again", causing international concern that Trump would use nuclear weapons in Iran during the 2026 Iran war. The Secretary General of Amnesty International said that Trump’s statement "may constitute a threat to commit genocide". Multiple right-wing commentators and many Democrats condemned the post, and some called for him to be removed through the 25th Amendment.

=== By Russia ===
On September 25, 2024, Russian President Vladimir Putin warned the West that if attacked with conventional weapons Russia would consider a nuclear retaliation. Putin went on to threaten nuclear powers that if they supported another country's attack on Russia, then they would be considered participants in such an aggression. This was described by the office of Ukrainian President Volodymyr Zelenskyy as nuclear blackmail.

=== By others ===
Following the 2025 India–Pakistan conflict, Indian Prime Minister Narendra Modi stated that Pakistan had been engaging in nuclear blackmail, which India would no longer tolerate, adding that the country would not be intimidated by nuclear threats.

In 1981, the US Department of Energy security director Martin Dowd said there had been 75 cases in the last five years of nuclear blackmail by people threatening to release radioactive material on the public, in which almost all of the cases were threats by "cranks and weirdos" but several blackmail attempts were serious.

== See also ==
- Brinkmanship
- Deterrence theory
- Doomsday Clock
- Essentials of Post–Cold War Deterrence
- Mutual assured destruction
- Nuclear imperialism
- Nuclear risk during the Russo-Ukrainian war (2022–present)
- Nuclear terrorism
- Samson Option
