= Russian International Affairs Council =

Pro-Russian think tank

Coordinates: 55.7414°N 37.6142°E

Russian International Affairs Council (RIAC)
- Type: Think tank
- Founded: 2011
- Headquarters: Moscow, Russia
- Key people: Igor Ivanov, Andrei Kortunov
- Website: russiancouncil.ru/en/

The Russian International Affairs Council (RIAC, Russian: Российский совет по международным делам) is a non-profit academic and diplomatic think tank established by the presidential decree dated 2 February 2010. The founders of the RIAC are the Ministry of Foreign Affairs of the Russian Federation, the Ministry of Education and Science, the Russian Academy of Science, the Russian Union of Industrialists and Entrepreneurs and the Russian news agency Interfax.

The Russian International Affairs Council was founded on orders of then-President Dmitry Medvedev to contribute to Russia's soft power efforts.

The RIAC activities are aimed at strengthening peace, friendship and solidarity between peoples, preventing international conflicts and promoting conflict resolution and crisis settlement. It operates as a link between the state, scholar community, business, and civil society in an effort to find foreign policy solutions to current international issues. The RIAC is one of Russia's public diplomacy tools.

The RIAC mission is to facilitate Russia's peaceful integration into the global community, partly through greater cooperation between Russian scientific institutions and foreign think tanks/scholars on major international issues.

The council's strategic mission is to facilitate communication between government officials and experts, as well as business and civil communities when elaborating foreign policy decisions.

== Management ==
- Igor Ivanov — President
- Andrei Kortunov — General Director
- Ivan Timofeyev (also spelled Ivan Timofeev) — Programming Director

== Presidium ==
- Pyotr Aven — Member of the Board of Directors of LetterOne, Former Minister of Foreign Economic Relations of Russia
- Igor Ivanov — RIAC President, Former Minister of Foreign Affairs of Russia, Former Secretary of the Russian Security Council
- Andrei Kortunov — RIAC General Director
- Fyodor Lukyanov — Editor-in-Chief of Russia in Global Politics magazine, Chairman of the Presidium of the Council for Foreign and Defense Policy, Research Director of the Valdai Discussion Club
- Aleksei Meshkov — Russian Ambassador to France, Russian Ambassador to Monaco, Former Deputy Minister of Foreign Affairs of Russia
- Dmitry Peskov — Press Secretary of the President of Russia, Deputy Head of the Russian Presidential Administration

== Activities ==
RIAC's Activities are aimed at assisting practical research in global politics and international relations, which will contribute to the implementation of Russia's foreign policy interests and the establishment of mechanisms for their advancement.

- Organizing research on foreign relations issues that are deemed top priorities in Russian foreign policy.
- Preparing expert evaluations and advice on foreign policy issues.
- Assisting with the implementation of research-based proposals and recommendations.
- Joining Russian, foreign and international organizations in research into issues in foreign relations and developing common approaches to identifying solutions.
- Holding academic events, i.e. conferences, roundtables, seminars, etc., to promote research into international problems and identify solutions.
- Supporting the publication and distribution of research results, including those obtained under the project activities.
- Helping integrate Russian and foreign research activities in the field of foreign relations.
- Providing education within the scope of the projects.
- Assisting with the political promotion of project outcomes.

== See also ==
- Carnegie Moscow Center
- Council on Foreign Relations (CFR)
- RAND Corporation
