= Flashman's Lady =

1977 novel by George MacDonald Fraser

- First edition
- Author: George MacDonald Fraser
- Cover artist: Arthur Barbosa
- Language: English
- Genre: Historical novel
- Publisher: Barrie & Jenkins
- Publication date: 1977
- Publication place: United Kingdom
- Media type: Print (Hardback & Paperback)
- Pages: 328
- ISBN: 978-0-452-26489-2
- OCLC: 16980497
- Preceded by: Flashman in the Great Game
- Followed by: Flashman and the Redskins

Flashman's Lady is a 1977 novel by George MacDonald Fraser. It is the sixth of the Flashman novels.

== Plot introduction ==
Presented within the frame of the supposedly discovered historical Flashman Papers, this book describes the bully Flashman from Tom Brown's School Days. The papers are attributed to Harry Paget Flashman, who is not only the bully featured in Thomas Hughes' novel, but also a well-known Victorian military hero. The book begins with an explanatory note that while this is the sixth packet of the papers to be published, the story contained within actually takes place chronologically after Flashman, the first packet to be published, and between the two timeframes featured in Royal Flash, the second story to be published.

Flashman's Lady begins with Flashman's encounter with Tom Brown, a former acquaintance from Rugby School, and progresses through cricket, battling pirates with James Brooke in Borneo, and enslavement in Madagascar under Queen Ranavalona I, detailing his life from 1842 to 1845. This book is unique among the Flashman series for containing extracts from the diary of his wife, Elspeth. It also contains a number of notes by Fraser, in the guise of editor, giving additional historical information on the events described.

== Plot summary ==
The story begins with a chance meeting between Flashman and Tom Brown in a London tavern, the Green Man. (Note: A historical tavern that was, as Fraser says, "a famous haunt of cricketers". However in the novel the author places it in Regent Street, when it was in fact located in Oxford Street.) As Flashman was a good cricket bowler at school, Brown invites him to join a scratch team of Old Rugbeians Brown is organising, to play in a cricket match at Lord's.

Flashman's impressive play (performing possibly the first ever hat-trick) leads to more matches, and an encounter with Daedalus Tighe, a notorious bookie. He also meets Don Solomon Haslam, a businessman from the East Indies, who has a lot of money, prestige, and a fascination for Elspeth, Flashman's wife. Due to a wager with Haslam, blackmail from Tighe, and threats from an angry, cuckolded duke, Flashman is forced to accompany Haslam, Elspeth, and Morrison (his father-in-law) on a trip to Singapore.

Haslam kidnaps Elspeth and flees east; investigations reveal that "Don Solomon Haslam", Old Etonian and prosperous businessman in London and Singapore, is also "Suleiman Usman", a well-known pirate prince based in Borneo. Flashman must reluctantly chase after them, with the help of James Brooke. This chase takes him to the jungles of Borneo, the nests of pirates, and finally to Madagascar, where the Malagasies enslave him and Queen Ranavalona makes him her military adviser and lover. Escape from the island seems impossible, and with his wife's help he has to overcome his cowardice to evade their minders.

== Characters ==
=== Fictional characters ===
- Harry Paget Flashman - The hero or anti-hero
- Elspeth - His loving and possibly unfaithful wife
- Morrison - His father-in-law
- Tom Brown - His former rival at Rugby
- Suleiman Usman/Solomon Haslam - The society man who went to Eton College is also the notorious pirate whose stronghold is in Borneo. Flashman describes him as "portly, you might say, if not fat, with a fleshy, smiling face, and fine teeth which flashed white against his swarthy skin."

=== Historical characters ===
- Fuller Pilch - Considered to be the best cricket batsman of his time, who Flashman catches out. Flashman says "I'm not sure that the sincerest tribute I got wasn't Fuller Pilch's knitted brow and steady glare as he sat on a bench with his tankard, looking me up and down for a full two minutes and never saying a word."
- Alfred Mynn - A renowned all-rounder cricketer of the era known for his roundarm bowling.
- Nicholas Felix - The third famous cricketer Flashman defeats.
- Richard Harris Barham - Noted novelist who Flashman meets at a hanging
- Whampoa - Chinese merchant who is the Flashmans' host in Singapore
- Joseph Balestier - Planter and merchant who was the first United States consul in Singapore
- Catchick Moses - Armenian Jewish merchant and co-founder of The Straits Times
- Henry Keppel - British post captain who accompanies Flashman and Brooke to Borneo
- James Brooke - The White Rajah who saves Flashman in Singapore and then takes him to rescue his wife. Flashman is impressed with him despite himself.
- Angela Burdett-Coutts - Flashman finds an image of her in Brooke's possession, and finds out that Brooke has a crush on her. Flashman remembers her not as fondly - "I'd taken a loving fumble at her myself...but she'd simply stared straight ahead of her and dislocated my thumb. Wasteful little prude."
- Charles Anthoni Johnson Brooke - Brooke's nephew and eventual successor as White Rajah
- Jean Laborde - A Frenchman and former slave in Madagascar who helps Flashman on his arrival in that country
- Ranavalona I - The queen of Madagascar and Flashman's lover. Flashman describes her as "a diabolical despot who was undoubtedly mad, fickle, dangerous, and fiendishly cruel," although he later decides she is more wicked than mad.
- Radama II of Madagascar - Ranavalona's son, who protects Elspeth in Madagascar.

== Reception ==
The Observer said "the narrative proceeds at a splendid posthorn gallop". The Guardian said it had "the same fruity value from one's favourite abject swine." "What a way to learn history!" declared the Daily Telegraph.

Auberon Waugh in the Evening Standard called it "a triumph".

Martin Amis called the novel one of this books of the year in a piece for The Observer declaring "as a recent convert to the Flashman Papers I sometimes feel I would be happy reading nothing else for the rest of my life - the variety of action and scene, the lightly worn erudition, Flashman's irresistible anti-heroism."
