= Flashman and the Dragon =

1985 novel by George MacDonald Fraser

- First edition
- Author: George MacDonald Fraser
- Cover artist: Arthur Barbosa
- Language: English
- Genre: Historical novel
- Publisher: Collins
- Publication date: 1985
- Publication place: United Kingdom
- Media type: Print (Hardback & Paperback)
- Pages: 352
- ISBN: 0-00-271245-8
- OCLC: 12520104
- Preceded by: Flashman and the Redskins
- Followed by: Flashman and the Mountain of Light

Flashman and the Dragon is a 1985 novel by George MacDonald Fraser. It is the eighth of the Flashman novels.

The Guardian said the book was "as buoyant as ever".

== Plot introduction ==
Presented within the frame of the supposedly discovered historical Flashman Papers, this book describes the bully Flashman from Tom Brown's School Days. The papers are attributed to Flashman, who is not only the bully featured in Thomas Hughes' novel, but also a well-known Victorian military hero. The book begins with an explanatory note detailing the discovery of these papers.

The present novel takes place shortly after Flashman's service with John Brown in the United States (detailed in Flashman and the Angel of the Lord). There is no explanation as to how he ends up in Hong Kong, but it is from here that he begins his adventures in China. Flashman meets both the leaders of the Taiping Rebellion and members of the Qing Dynasty who participated in the Second Opium War.

== Plot summary ==
In Hong Kong, Flashman is persuaded by Phoebe Carpenter, a lovely minister's wife, to accompany a shipment of opium into Canton, in exchange for a large sum of money and the promise of a later, more pleasant meeting. On the way he discovers that instead of opium he is carrying guns to the Taiping rebels. In Canton, Flashman manages to convince Harry Smith Parkes that he was trying to stop the shipment. However, instead of being able to head for home as he originally intended, he is put on the intelligence staff in Shanghai. From Shanghai he travels to Nanking and meets the leaders of the Taiping rebels, in order to persuade them not to march on Shanghai.

Flashman then proceeds to the mouth of the Peiho to join Lord Elgin's staff for his march to Peking. After being captured by the Imperials, he meets Xianfeng Emperor and becomes the prisoner and lover of Yehonala, the imperial concubine. When Lord Elgin's army arrives at Peking, he witnesses the destruction of the Imperial Summer Palace. But after that event, while heading for home, he is drugged and apparently kidnapped (perhaps shanghaied, given the dress of his kidnappers) while attempting to fulfil his promise with Phoebe Carpenter. There the story ends, and it is never revealed in any subsequent volume what then became of him immediately afterwards. However, there are several references in other books to his service in the American Civil War, suggesting that he must have returned to that country before 1864, and we know (from Flashman on the March) that he was in Mexico in 1867.

== Characters ==
=== Fictional characters ===
- Colonel Sir Harry Paget Flashman - The protagonist.
- Reverend Josiah Carpenter - A British missionary in China who smuggles firearms to the Taiping rebels.
- Mrs Phoebe Carpenter - Reverend Carpenter's wife.
- Private Nolan - A British Army soldier who is twice imprisoned with Flashman.

=== Historical characters ===
- James Hope Grant - British general and commander of the British forces during the Second Opium War. Flashman says, "He wasn't much of a general; it was notorious he'd never read a line outside the Bible; he was so inarticulate he could barely utter any order but 'Charge!'; his notions of discipline were to flog anything that moved...But none of this mattered in the least because, you see, Hope Grant was the best fighting man in the world."
- Frederick Townsend Ward - American soldier of fortune and initial commander of the Ever Victorious Army. Flashman tries to shoot him at one point, but later says, "while Gordon finished the Taiping business, it was young happy-go-lucky Fred who broke the ground for him."
- Hong Xiuquan - Founder and leader of the Taiping Rebellion, referred to as Hung Hsiu-chuan. Flashman meets him at a time when his mind has deteriorated from excess debauchery, and refers to him as a "raving, dangerous, dreadful madman, and one of the most diabolical powers ever loosed on a suffering world."
- Harry Smith Parkes - British diplomat
- John Arbuthnot Fisher - Midshipman when Flashman meets him on the Pearl River, but later Admiral of the Fleet.
- Garnet Joseph Wolseley - British army officer on Hope Grant's staff in China.
- Charles Montauban - Commander of the French forces during the Second Opium War.
- Lord Elgin - High Commissioner to China and the ambassador whose job it was to go to Peking and see that the Treaty of Tientsin was honoured. He was also responsible for the destruction of the Summer Palace, which was vilified by many as an uncivilised act of vandalism. Flashman, however, liked him and called him, "the shrewdest diplomatic of his day, hard as a hammer and subtle as a Spaniard." Flashman sees the destruction of the Summer Palace as a way of punishing the cruel and decadent court rather than the populace.
- John Moyse - the "Private of the Buffs" who refuses to kow-tow to a local mandarin. Flashman has no such scruples.
- Dighton Probyn - British cavalry officer, decorated with Victoria Cross.
- Li Xiucheng - Military commander of the Taiping Rebellion, referred to as Loyal Prince Li. Flashman says he could "feel the force that had brought him in ten years from apprentice charcoal-burner and private soldier to the third place in the Taiping hierarchy...It was there, in the cold soft voice and hard unwinking eyes; he was a fanatic of course, and a formidable one."
- Chen Yucheng
- Hong Rengan - cousin of Hong Xiuquan and Prime Minister of the Taiping movement, referred to as Hung Jen-Kan. Flashman calls him an "extraordinary man".
- Charles George Gordon - British army officer; Flashman meets him briefly during the destruction of the Summer Palace.
- Henry Loch - Secretary to Lord Elgin.
- Felice Beato - A semi-official photographer to the British forces of the expedition.
- Prince Yi
- Sushun
- Sengge Rinchen - Mongol general leading the Manchu forces, referred to as Sang Kol-in-sen.
- The Xianfeng Emperor - Eighth emperor of the Manchu Qing Dynasty, referred to as Emperor Hsienfeng.
- Empress Dowager Ci'an
- Empress Dowager Cixi - Yehonala, the imperial concubine, when Flashman meets her. Flashman at one point refers to her as a monster, although he reconsiders and instead says, "With Yehonala everything was extreme; whatever she did was done with every fibre of her, and enjoyed with sensual intensity - whether it was nibbling a sugared walnut, or half-killing a partner in bed, or flaunting a new dress, or having an offender flogged nearly to death..." He later says she was one of three women he ever felt more than lust for (excluding Elspeth), the other two being Lola Montez and Rani Lakshmi Bai. She was also one of the three most beautiful people in the world according to Flashman, the other two being Lola Montez and Elspeth.
- The Tongzhi Emperor
- Prince Gong
- Szu-Zhan - A very tall female bandit - member of the Provident Brave Butterfly Triad.
