= Championship belt =

Large belt used to signify a champion

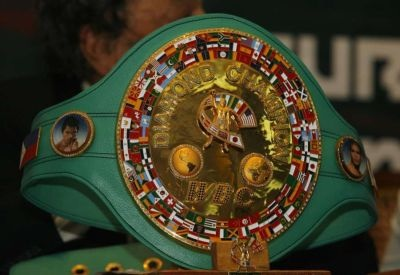
World Boxing Council championship design belt

A championship belt is a large, extravagantly designed belt used primarily in combat sports as an award, similarly to trophies in other sports. There are several companies in the business of constructing championship belts. The first belt given as a prize for accomplishments within the ring was presented in 1810 by King George III to bare-knuckle boxer Tom Cribb, after he defeated Tom Molineaux, an American who was possibly a former slave.

Championship belts are primarily used as awards in combat sports, including professional boxing, professional wrestling, and mixed martial arts. The grand prize of the 2024 Microsoft Excel World Championship was a championship belt. Championship belts have also been used in non-combat sports, such as golf, as well as esports.

== See also ==
- Championship ring
- Medal
- Trophy
