= The Candlemass Road =

- First edition (UK)
- Author: George MacDonald Fraser
- Language: English
- Genre: historical fiction
- Publisher: Harvill Press (UK); HarperCollins (US)
- Publication date: 1993
- Publication place: United Kingdom
- Pages: 156

The Candlemass Road is a historical novel from George MacDonald Fraser set in the time of the Border Reivers, a period Fraser had earlier written about in The Steel Bonnets and would later return to in The Reavers.

Fraser later described it as "a rather dark morality tale - at least I meant it to have a moral - in what I hope was a reasonable imitation of Elizabethan English".

The book is mentioned in the film All My Friends Are Leaving Brisbane.

== Reception ==
The Washington Post said "Readers who enjoy a snatch of history brought to life will enjoy this brief but fascinating tale. However, the slightness of the plot, along with the old-fashioned treatment of point of view and the lack of character development, will leave those looking for a satisfying story disappointed."
