= Flashman and the Angel of the Lord =

1994 novel by George MacDonald Fraser

- First edition
- Author: George MacDonald Fraser
- Language: English
- Genre: Historical novel
- Publisher: HarperCollins
- Publication date: 1994
- Publication place: United Kingdom
- Media type: Print (hardback & paperback)
- Pages: 400
- ISBN: 0-00-273015-4
- OCLC: 31331024
- Preceded by: Flashman and the Mountain of Light
- Followed by: Flashman and the Tiger

Flashman and the Angel of the Lord is a 1994 novel by George MacDonald Fraser. It is the tenth of the Flashman novels.

== Plot introduction ==
Presented within the frame of the supposedly discovered historical Flashman Papers, this book describes the bully Flashman from Tom Brown's School Days. The papers are attributed to Flashman, who is not only the bully featured in Thomas Hughes' novel, but also a well-known Victorian military hero. The book begins with an explanatory note detailing the discovery of these papers.

The present novel takes place immediately after Flashman in the Great Game and before Flashman and the Dragon. It details Flashman's involvement with John Brown and his raid on Harper's Ferry, West Virginia, from 1858 to 1859.

== Plot summary ==
At the start of the novel, Flashman leaves Calcutta before the wrath of a cuckolded husband can find him. He proceeds to South Africa, where by a chance meeting he reunites with John Charity Spring (whom he had worked for as a slaver in Flash for Freedom! and seen shanghaied in Flashman and the Redskins). Spring uses his daughter, Miranda, and her feminine wiles to have Flashman drugged and sent to the United States, where charges against his old aliases still exist. Flashman manages to avoid the authorities, but Crixus (one of the chiefs of the Underground Railroad from Flash for Freedom!) finds him and tries to convince him to join John Brown's attempt to start a slave rebellion. One of Crixus' followers, a black man named Joe Simmons, actually works for the Kuklos, a possible forerunner of the Ku Klux Klan. They also want Flashman to help Brown, but in order to start a civil war. One last double-cross exists: the wife of the leader of the Kuklos works for Allan Pinkerton, who brings Flashman to meet William H. Seward. Seward, considered by many at that time to be the next President of the United States, also wants Flashman to join with Brown, but to slow him down and prevent the raid into the South from ever happening, and therefore prevent civil war.

Of course Flashman fails at this, and he becomes an eyewitness to the whole event.

== Characters ==
=== Fictional characters ===
- Flashman – The hero or anti-hero
- John Charity Spring
- Miranda Spring
- Joe Simmons
- Crixus
- Annette Mandeville
- Charles La Force
- Hannah Popplewell

=== Historical characters ===
- Julia Ward Howe – Future writer of the Battle Hymn of the Republic. Flashman meets her at a party and calls her "a spanking little red-head with a sharp eye."
- John Brown – One of the title characters, Brown was considered to be either a hero or a scoundrel, depending on whose view of history one is reading. As far as Flashman was concerned, he usually disliked anyone that nearly got him killed, and he says, "he was a sincere, worthy, autocratic, good-natured, terrible, dangerous old zealot, hard as nails, iron-willed, brave beyond belief, and possessed of all the muscular Christian virtues which I can't stand." Later Flashman says, "there's a case to be made for saying he was the most evil influence ever let loose in North America." Despite all this, Flashman clearly liked the man, and he even saves Brown's life towards the end.
- George Edward Grey – Governor of Cape Colony.
- Allan Pinkerton – A Scottish born detective.
- William H. Seward – United States Senator. Flashman says he was "civil, pleasant, easy – and the most vicious arm-twister I ever struck".
- Franklin Benjamin Sanborn – A Member of the Secret Six.
- Henry Wilson – United States Senator
- Samuel Gridley Howe – A Member of the Secret Six.
- George Luther Stearns – A Member of the Secret Six.
- John Henrie Kagi – "Secretary of War" to Brown.
- Aaron Stevens - One of John Brown's raiders.
- Shields Green - One of John Brown's raiders.
- Dangerfield Newby – One of John Brown's raiders.
- Barclay Coppock – One of John Brown's raiders.
- Frederick Douglass – Escaped slave and abolitionist. Brown meets him with Flashman in tow in order to convince him to join the raid. Flashman describes him as "altogether white in speech and style, but I doubt if he knew it or cared; he had a fine sense of his own dignity, which would have irked me whatever colour he was".
- J.E.B. Stuart – Robert E. Lee's aide-de-camp at Harper's Ferry.
- Henry A. Wise – The Governor of Virginia.
