= Flash for Freedom! =

Novel by George MacDonald Fraser

- First edition cover
- Author: George MacDonald Fraser
- Cover artist: Arthur Barbosa
- Language: English
- Genre: Historical novel
- Publisher: Barrie & Jenkins
- Publication date: 1971
- Publication place: United Kingdom
- Media type: Print (Hardback & Paperback)
- Pages: 272
- ISBN: 978-0-214-65358-2
- OCLC: 108225
- Dewey Decimal: 823/.9/14
- LC Class: PZ4.F8418 Ro PR6056.R287
- Preceded by: Royal Flash
- Followed by: Flashman at the Charge

Flash for Freedom! is a 1971 novel by George MacDonald Fraser. It is the third of the Flashman novels.

== Plot introduction ==
Presented within the frame of the supposedly discovered historical Flashman Papers, this book describes the bully Flashman from Tom Brown's School Days. The papers are attributed to Flashman, who is not only the bully featured in Thomas Hughes' novel, but also a well-known Victorian military hero. The book begins with an explanatory note detailing the discovery of these papers, the supposed controversy concerning their authenticity and Fraser's hinted at vindication through an article from The New York Times from 29 July 1969.

The New York Times article is instead about the publisher's (World Publishing Company) concerns that 10 of the 34 reviewers of Flashman had ignored the publicity material that stated the book was a novel. Instead, these reviewers had praised the memoir for its "ring of authenticity", but "the only difficulty with these encomiums for Sir Harry Flashman is that he is a complete fiction". The confusion is somewhat understandable because "Fraser has been lauded for his meticulous research, thrilling plotting and sensitivity to the realities of history and human nature, as well as his refreshingly non-PC attitudes. ,,, and "his peerless gift for dialect and slang., but it is the device of the series’ outspoken and morally dubious protagonist that makes such accounts stand out."

Flash for Freedom! begins with Flashman considering an attempt at being made a Member of Parliament and continues through his involvement in the Atlantic slave trade, the Underground Railroad, and meeting a future president, detailing his life from 1848 to 1849. It also contains a number of notes by Fraser, in the guise of editor, giving additional historical information on the events described.

== Plot summary ==
From Dahomey to the slave state of Mississippi, Flashman has cause to regret a game of pontoon with Benjamin Disraeli and Lord George Bentinck. From his ambition for a seat in the House of Commons, he has to settle instead for a role in the West African slave trade, under the command of Captain John Charity Spring, a Latin-spouting madman. Captured by the United States Navy, Flashman has to talk his way out of prison by assuming the first of his many false identities in America. After a visit to Washington, D.C., he escapes from his Navy protectors in New Orleans and hides in a brothel run by an amorous madame, Susie Willinck. He is again taken into custody, this time by members of the Underground Railroad. Travelling up the Mississippi River with a fugitive slave ends badly once again, and the rest of the story has Flashman as a slave driver on a plantation, a potential slave himself, and a slave stealer fleeing from vigilantes; on the run, he meets, and is assisted by, Abraham Lincoln (still a junior congressman at the time) who shows his granite-hard underlying opposition to slavery. Eventually he ends up back in New Orleans at the mercy of Spring. This story is continued in Flashman and the Redskins.

At the end of the novel, Flashman claims that his escape with Cassy across the Ohio River was the inspiration for the anti-slavery novel, Uncle Tom's Cabin, with the names altered and the story focusing on the slave Cassy rather than Flashman.

== Characters ==
=== Fictional characters ===
- Harry Flashman - The anti-hero.
- John Morrison - Harry's Scottish father-in-law and wealthy mill-owner. An unattractive example of the Victorian capitalist class. The future Lord Paisley repeatedly laments the financial cost of his daughter's marriage while making use of Flashman's relatively high social status and popular fame. In Flash for Freedom! he contrives to have his unwanted son-in-law shipped out of England to serve as supercargo on a slave ship. Flashman intends to blackmail him with this information only to find he has died in the meantime.
- Captain John Charity Spring M.A. - The formidable and eccentric captain of the Balliol College, a slave ship owned in part by Morrison. He continually utters Latin phrases (conveniently translated by Fraser). Spring reappears in Flashman and the Redskins and finally as a wealthy Cape Colony landowner in Flashman and the Angel of the Lord, where he settles his outstanding grievances against Flashman by having the latter kidnapped. Spring is referred to as having "long gone to his account" in Flashman and the Tiger, having been murdered by Sebastian Moran.
- Lady Caroline Lamb - A slave transported by the Balliol College whom Flashman "covers" and to whom he teaches some English and (to startle Spring) Latin phrases. Flashman gives her the name of a famous British aristocrat.
- Susie Willinck - A New Orleans madame with whom Flashman hides out on his escape from the Naval authorities. She later reappears in Flashman and the Redskins.
- Cassy - A young female slave who helps Flashman escape from his imprisoners in Mississippi. Courageous and passionate she bemuses Flashman by her mixed judgments of his character.
- George Randolph - An educated and intelligent quadroon who twice attempts to organize slave risings in the South. The anti-slavery underground railroad movement manipulates Flashman into escorting the fugitive Randolph to freedom in Ohio. The equally conceited and self-centered duo detest each other. Randolph is presumed dead after falling overboard from a Mississippi steamboat, but is reported as having reached Canada alive at the end of the novel.
- Peter Omohundro - A slave-catcher who recognises Randolph while Flashman is trying to smuggle him out, leading to Flashman abandoning his charge. He later reappears in Flashman and the Redskins, where he recognises Flashman in a bar and tries to have him arrested, but is killed by Spring.
- Tommy Bryant - a fellow officer of Flashman's in Flashman. Bryant settles an outstanding grievance against Flashman by framing him in Flash for Freedom! for cheating at pontoon; Flashman responds by attacking Bryant, leading to the former being forced to ship with Spring.
- Annette Mandeville - The wife of a Southern slave owner who has an affair with Flashman before framing him for rape when the affair is discovered, causing her husband to sell him as a slave in revenge. She later reappears in Flashman and the Angel of the Lord as an agent of the Kuklos conspiracy, who ultimately kill her for betraying them.
- Mr. Mandeville - Annette's husband, who sells Flashman into slavery after she accuses him of rape. By the time of Flashman and the Angel of the Lord he has died of alcohol poisoning.
- Buck Robinson - A slave-catcher who pursues Flashman and Cassy through Mississippi and shoots Flashman in the buttock before eventually being driven away by Abraham Lincoln while trying to make him give them up.
- George Hiscoe and Thomas Little - A pair of slave traders who Flashman is given to by the Mandevilles, charged with delivering him and Cassy to a plantation. Both are killed by Cassy in the course of their escape.
- Beauchamp Millward Comber - A British naval officer spying on Spring who dies of injuries sustained while fighting the Amazons after confessing his secret to Flashman, who later impersonates him after the Balliol College is captured.
- Crixus - An operative of the Underground Railroad who press-gangs Flashman into trying to help Randolph escape. He later reappears in Flashman and the Angel of the Lord.
- Kinnie - A slave-trader aboard the Balliol College. He is killed by the Dahomey Amazons.
- Kirk - A slave-trader aboard the Balliol College. He is captured by the Dahomey Amazons and last seen being raped as a form of ritual humiliation.
- Sullivan - A slave-trader aboard the Balliol College. He is shot and seemingly killed by Spring, but Flashman and the Tiger retcons this by mentioning that he was murdered by Sebastian Moran.
- Looney - A servant aboard the Balliol College and a friend of Sullivan. Flashman convinces him to shoot Spring after he shoots Sullivan.
- The cabin boy - A servant aboard the Balliol College who is sold to the Dahomeys by Spring. In Flashman and the Tiger he is revealed to be Sebastian Moran, who has spent his entire adult life tracking down and killing Balliol College crew in revenge.

=== Historical characters ===
- Benjamin Disraeli - The future Prime Minister, who Flashman calls a "cocky little sheeny". Although casually insulted by Flashman at Cleeve House, Disraeli is subsequently one of the few persons present to question his guilt as a card-cheat.
- Lord George Bentinck
- Fanny Locke
- William Ewart Gladstone
- King Gezo - King of Dahomey. Spring deals with him for slaves.
- Dahomey Amazons - The army of King Gezo who butcher a small number of Spring's crew.
- Abraham Lincoln - Future President of the United States. Flashman describes him as "an unusually tall man, with the ugliest face you ever saw, deep dark eye sockets and a chin like a coffin" and says, "just why I liked him I couldn't say; I suppose in his way he had the makings of as big a scoundrel as I am myself".

== Background ==
Fraser says the idea for the climactic trial sequence came from his wife.

Diabolique magazine argued this would have been a better novel to adapt for the movies than Royal Flash but there has been no film version to date.
