= Flashman and the Mountain of Light =

1990 novel by George MacDonald Fraser

- First edition
- Author: George MacDonald Fraser
- Cover artist: Arthur Barbosa
- Language: English
- Genre: Historical novel
- Publisher: Collins
- Publication date: 1990
- Publication place: United Kingdom
- Media type: Print (Hardback & Paperback)
- Pages: 332
- ISBN: 0-00-271135-4
- OCLC: 21299277
- Preceded by: Flashman and the Dragon
- Followed by: Flashman and the Angel of the Lord

Flashman and the Mountain of Light is a 1990 novel by George MacDonald Fraser. It is the ninth of the Flashman novels.

== Plot introduction ==
Presented within the frame of the supposedly discovered historical Flashman Papers, this book describes the bully Flashman from Tom Brown's School Days. The papers are attributed to Flashman, who is not only the bully featured in Thomas Hughes' novel, but also a well-known Victorian military hero. The book begins with an explanatory note detailing the discovery of these papers.

The book begins with Flashman being questioned about Koh-i-Noor by Queen Victoria. As Flashman cannot tell the truth to the Queen without offending her, he reminisces about the First Sikh War, 1845 and 1846, and how he acquired Koh-i-Noor (The Mountain of Light).

== Plot summary ==
At the end of events in Flashman's Lady, Flashman is sent to India when the English are anticipating conflict with the Sikh Army, the Khalsa. He is dispatched by Major George Broadfoot to the Punjab, masquerading as a solicitor attempting to settle the Soochet legacy. Flashman becomes entangled in the intrigues of the Punjabi court before being forced to flee at the outbreak of war, then becomes involved in plans by the Punjabi nobility to curb the power of the Khalsa.

Returning to the relative safety of the British forces, Flashman arrives just in time to become an unwilling participant in the attack on Ferozeshah. Injured, he attempts to avoid the rest of the war in a sick bed, but is called personally by the Maharani of the Punjab to attend to an urgent mission: smuggling her son Daleep Singh and the Koh-i-Noor diamond out of the country.

== Characters ==
=== Fictional ===
- Flashman

=== Historical ===
- George Broadfoot
- Hugh Gough, 1st Viscount Gough
- Henry Hardinge, 1st Viscount Hardinge
- Henry Havelock
- Alexander Gardner
- Jind Kaur
- Duleep Singh
- Gulab Singh
- Lal Singh
- Tej Singh
- Josiah Harlan

== Critical reception ==
A review by Charles Solomon, of the Los Angeles Times, highlighted that Fraser's thorough knowledge of British imperial history enabled a realistic depiction of events experienced by Flashman, and that the book "abounds with swashbuckling thrills".
