= Flashman and the Tiger =

1999 book by George MacDonald Fraser

- First edition
- Author: George MacDonald Fraser
- Language: English
- Genre: Historical novel
- Publisher: HarperCollins
- Publication date: 1999
- Publication place: United Kingdom
- Media type: Print (hardback & paperback)
- Pages: 352 pp (paperback)
- ISBN: 0-00-721722-6
- OCLC: 62265058
- Preceded by: Flashman and the Angel of the Lord
- Followed by: Flashman on the March

Flashman and the Tiger is a 1999 book by George MacDonald Fraser. It is the eleventh of the Flashman books.

== Plot introduction ==
Presented within the frame of the supposedly discovered historical Flashman Papers, this book describes the bully Flashman from Tom Brown's School Days. The papers are attributed to Flashman, who is not only the bully featured in Thomas Hughes' novel, but also a well-known Victorian military hero. The book begins with an explanatory note detailing the discovery of these papers. It also states that smaller narratives have been discovered mixed in with the larger packets which comprise the previous books. Flashman and the Tiger is a collection of three of these narratives.

"The Road to Charing Cross" is the longest, detailing Flashman's involvement in preventing an assassination attempt on Emperor Franz Josef. It takes place in 1878 and from 1883 to 1884. "The Subtleties of Baccarat" describes the Tranby Croft affair in 1890 to 1891. "Flashman and the Tiger", covering 1879 and 1894, borrows some characters from Sir Arthur Conan Doyle for a tale about blackmail and revenge. It is also the only Flashman story to give any detail about his adventures with the Zulus. The title story had been originally serialised in the Daily Express, between 29 September 1975 and 3 October 1975, with illustrations by Andrew Robb.

== Plot summary ==
"The Road to Charing Cross" begins with Flashman going to Berlin with Henri Blowitz to help him get a copy of the Treaty of Berlin and publish it before anyone else has it. He also meets Caprice, a beautiful member of the French secret service. Five years later, Flashman is looking for an excuse to leave London and avoid being sent to Sudan with Charles George Gordon. Luckily, a letter from Blowitz arrives inviting him to Paris. He rides the maiden voyage of the Orient Express and makes the acquaintance of a princess, Kralta, supposedly so that she can sleep with him. This turns out to be a ruse on the part of the princess and Otto von Bismarck, and Flashman is forced to join with Rupert Willem von Starnberg, son of the villain from Royal Flash, and save Emperor Franz Josef from assassination by Magyar nationalists. It turns out that Starnberg has plans of his own, and Flashman must save both the Emperor and himself.

"The Subtleties of Baccarat" has Flashman at the home of Sir Arthur Wilson with the Prince of Wales, just when the royal baccarat scandal is unfolding. Unlike in most Flashman stories, he is mainly an observer of the event, simply giving bad advice when asked to. However, in a twist, someone he has known for years unexpectedly turns out to be the most important player in the story.

"Flashman and the Tiger" begins in South Africa, with Flashman fleeing from the Battle of Isandlwana in a wagon. After his escape, he meets Tiger Jack Moran about ten miles (16 km) away, and both head to Rorke's Drift and the nightmare that awaits them. Later, at the mention of Flashman's name, Moran says "if I'd only known." Years later, in 1894, Flashman finds out what he meant when Moran blackmails his granddaughter for sex. Moran reveals that he was the cabin boy on Captain John Charity Spring's slave ship Balliol College (see Flash for Freedom!), who was traded to King Gezo of Dahomey as a white slave and has spent much of his adult life avenging himself on the ship's former crew. To save her, Flashman lies in wait for Moran disguised as a drunken tramp, but finds himself in a scene from "The Adventure of the Empty House", and encounters Sherlock Holmes, who has Moran arrested. Watson recognises him, but is "corrected" by Holmes, who produces an entirely incorrect analysis of who the "tramp" is.

== Characters ==
=== The Road to Charing Cross ===
==== Fictional characters ====
- Flashman - The hero or anti-hero.
- Caprice
- Princess Kralta
- Rupert Willem von Starnberg
- Hutton, of the Foreign Office.

==== Historical characters ====
- Henri Blowitz - Bohemian journalist. Flashman describes him as "a five-foot butterball with a beaming baby face behind a mighty moustache, innocent blue eyes, bald head, and frightful whiskers a foot long".
- Ulysses S. Grant - Former U.S. president, he was visiting Europe at the time of the story.
- Patrice MacMahon - President of the French Third Republic. Flashman is with Grant when he meets with him.
- Otto von Bismarck - German statesman. Flashman has enough prior experience of him that he avoids another encounter, but still accidentally meets him in Berlin.
- Pyotr Andreyevich Shuvalov - Russian statesman. He is the source of most of Blowitz's information about the treaty, through Caprice, who seduces him.
- Georges Nagelmackers - Head of the Orient Express line.
- Franz Joseph I of Austria - Emperor of Austria. Flashman saves him from assassination.
- Elisabeth of Bavaria - Empress consort of Austria. Flashman dances with her at a ball.
- Johann Strauss II - Conducts the band while Flashman and Empress Elisabeth dance.
- Lord Granville - The British Foreign Secretary.
- Garnet Wolseley - The British field marshal.
- Charles George Gordon - The British major-general.

=== The Subtleties of Baccarat ===
==== Fictional characters ====
- Flashman
- Elspeth - His adoring and possibly unfaithful wife.

==== Historical characters ====
- Prince of Wales - Future King Edward VII. Flashman appears to know him well and claims to have shared his lovers, Lillie Langtry and Daisy Brooke. He also suspects Elspeth of having "been at grips in a potting-shed at Windsor in '59" with him.
- William Gordon-Cumming - Central figure in the scandal. His similarities with Flashman are not lost on the latter, who eyes him with some jealousy as a younger version (and more authentic military hero) of himself.
- Lord Coleridge - Lord Chief Justice of England and Wales, and judge at the trial.
- Charles Russell - British statesman who represents the defendants at the trial.
- H. H. Asquith - Future Prime Minister who represents the defendants at the trial.

=== Flashman and the Tiger ===
==== Fictional characters ====
- Flashman
- Elspeth
- Tiger Jack Moran - Flashman meets him after the Battle of Isandlwana on the way to Rorke's Drift, and describes him as "a killing gentleman."
- Selina Flashman - She is Flashman's nineteen-year-old granddaughter. With uncharacteristic sentimentality Flashman is prepared to spend much of his fortune in preserving "Selly's" innocence from the licentious Moran. This proves to be wasted effort when he discovers that she has become one of the Prince of Wales' mistresses.
- Sherlock Holmes
- Doctor Watson

==== Historical characters ====
- Henry Pulleine - Brevet lieutenant colonel at the Battle of Isandlwana.
- Anthony Durnford - Lieutenant colonel at the Battle of Isandlwana.
- John Chard - British lieutenant of the Royal Engineers and commanding officer at Rorke's Drift.
- Lord Chelmsford - A British general.
- Gonville Bromhead - British lieutenant at Rorke's Drift.
- Oscar Wilde - A playwright.
- Edward VII
- George Smith - British army chaplain
