= The Pyrates =

1983 comic novel

- First edition
- Author: George MacDonald Fraser
- Language: English
- Publisher: William Collins, Sons (UK)
- Publication date: 1983
- Publication place: United Kingdom

The Pyrates is a comic novel by George MacDonald Fraser, published in 1983. Fraser called it "a burlesque fantasy on every swashbuckler I ever read or saw".

== Plot ==
Written in arch, ironic style and containing a great deal of deliberate anachronism, it traces the adventures of a classic hero (Captain Benjamin Avery, RN, very loosely based on Henry Every), multiple damsels in distress, and the six captains who lead the infamous Coast Brotherhood (John Rackham, Black Bilbo, Firebeard, Happy Dan Pew, Akbar the Terrible and Sheba the She-Wolf). It also concerns the charismatic anti-hero, Colonel Thomas Blood (cashiered), a rakish dastard who is loosely modeled on the historical figure, Thomas Blood. All of the above face off against the malevolently hilarious Spanish viceroy of Cartagena, Don Lardo. The book's 400 pages of continuous action travel from England to Madagascar to various Caribbean ports of call along the Spanish Main.

As with Fraser's other historical novels, the storyline incorporates fictitious characters with real life people such as King Charles II and Samuel Pepys.

The book is completely unrelated to the 1991 movie Pyrates starring Kevin Bacon.

== 1986 TV version ==
The Pyrates
- Directed by: Andrew Gosling
- Written by: Mervyn Haisman
- Produced by: Ian Keill
- Starring: Marcus Gilbert
- Cinematography: Derek Slee
- Edited by: Dave Hambelton
- Music by: Rodney Newton
- Production companies: BBC; Canamedia Productions
- Distributed by: BBC Two
- Release date: 21 December 1986
- Running time: 85 mins
- Countries: United Kingdom; Canada
- Language: English

A television adaptation starring Marcus Gilbert and Jane Snowden was shown on BBC2 on 28 December 1986.

The film was one of a number made by the team of Andrew Gosling and Ian Keill.

George MacDonald Fraser had written numerous screenplays but had nothing to do with the film, claiming "The BBC bought it and they liked to do their own thing. All I asked was that they kept as closely as they could to the original."

The Glasgow Herald wrote "the television version seemed to me to be a rather pale imitation of the original."

=== Cast ===
- Marcus Gilbert as Captain Ben Avery
- Tom Adams as Jack Rackham
- Jane Snowden as Lady Vanity Rooke
- Josette Simon as Sheba
- Malcolm Stoddard as Colonel Blood
- Nicholas Gecks as Happy Dan Pew
- Wanda Ventham as Anne Bonny
- Tatyana Colombo as Donna Meliflua
- John Savident as Don Lardo
- Robin Bailey as Solomon
- Howard Lang as Captain Yardley
- John Rapley as Samuel Pepys
- Howard Goorney as Groonbaun
- Nosher Powell as Firebeard
- Richard Davies as Dai Lemmer

== Stage version ==
A world premiere stage adaptation was written and produced by members of Chicago's Defiant Theatre in 2004.

== Captain in Calico ==
Much of the material had been covered in a novel Fraser wrote in 1959, Captain in Calico. This novel was published after his death.
