= The Green Man and Still =

Former tavern in London, England

Coordinates: 51°30′55″N 0°8′29″W

The Green Man and Still was a tavern in Oxford Street, London. It was much favoured during the 18th and 19th centuries by cricketers playing at the nearby Thomas Lord's grounds, including William Beldham, Tom Walker and David Harris, and was also patronised by the leading bookmakers of the day.

== Etymology ==
The name may have been a reference to the coat of arms of the Worshipful Company of Distillers. This included a distilling apparatus - a still - and an American Indian, who sign-painters would have depicted clad in green leaves and similar to the legendary Green Man. The Green Man, conflated with the legendary wild man of the wood had been symbols of intoxication since the 17th century.

A number of other pubs have had this name, including former pubs in Clarkenwell, London and Chorley.

== History ==
The tavern was originally situated at 335 Oxford Street, between Argyll Street and Queen Street (which no longer exists) and was also a coaching inn (a 1792 map shows it at the entrance to a stagecoach yard), the start point/terminus of several stage coach routes out of London. In the early 19th century there were two daily coaches from Bath that stopped here, as well as wagons from Cheltenham

In the early part of the 19th century, the pub was a meeting place for professional cricketers and bookmakers. At the time, large sums of money could be bet on cricket and the Green Man was often where bookmakers would meet players to bribe them to throw matches.

By 1852 it was also a parcel office for the London & North-Western Railway and in 1864 the established coaching firm of Chaplin & Horne took over the office, which had most likely stopped being a tavern by this date. In 1882, this office apparently closed and moved to 241 Oxford Street: however, as the current 241 premises (following the renumbering of Oxford Street during the late 19th century redevelopment) are barely 100 feet further west down the street, it couldn't have been too arduous a move. The building at 241 was purchased in 1898 by the Baker St & Waterloo Railway and demolished in February 1901, by which time the office had relocated to 151 Oxford Street (between Berwick Street and Poland Street), retaining the 'Green Man & Still' name as late as the early 1920s.

== In culture ==
The tavern, described as a "famous haunt of cricketers", is mentioned in George McDonald Fraser's 1977 historical novel Flashman's Lady, although the author places it in Regent Street not in Oxford Street. Here, the scoundrel Harry Flashman has a chance meeting with Tom Brown, an old school acquaintance, which sets in course an unwelcome train of events.
