= The Light's on at Signpost =

2002 memoir by George MacDonald Fraser

- Author: George MacDonald Fraser
- Language: English
- Genre: memoir
- Publisher: HarperCollins
- Publication date: 2002
- Publication place: United Kingdom
- Pages: 368
- ISBN: 0-00-713646-3
- Dewey Decimal: 823/.914 B
- LC Class: PR6056.R287 Z466 2002

The Light's on at Signpost is a memoir from novelist and screenwriter George MacDonald Fraser covering his various adventures in screenwriting as well as essays on the state of then-contemporary Britain.

== Overview ==
The book is composed of three parts, told cyclically: the first is Angry Old Man, where Fraser discusses his observations of British society and government, like Tony Blair's Labour government, education and Irish terrorism. This is then followed by Interlude, where Fraser makes some remark on something amusing or interesting in his own life, such as his military career, his relationship with Oliver Reed or boyhood trips to the Highlands. The last, Shooting Scripts, is his recollections of working on various film projects. These include chapters on:

- working on The Three Musketeers with Richard Lester;
- a diary entry when working on The Prince and the Pauper (1977);
- his work on the script for Superman (1978);
- working on Force 10 from Navarone in Yugoslavia;
- being approached to write a sequel to The Crimson Pirate by Burt Lancaster;
- adapting the novel Tai Pan, including working with Steve McQueen and Richard Fleischer;
- and working on Red Sonja and meeting Arnold Schwarzenegger.

== Reception ==
D.J. Taylor's review in The Guardian was mixed, remarking the film recollections had interest, but the political sections were 'stern and entirely predictable harangues on such subjects as law and order, New Labour and so on'. Hugh Massingberd, writing for The Telegraph, was more positive; he praised Fraser's writing style, earnestness and humour, but ultimately found it a 'strange mixed bag of a book'.

== See also ==
- Quartered Safe Out Here, another memoir by Fraser
