= Defiant Theatre =

American theatre company

Defiant Theatre was a Chicago-based theatre company founded in 1993 by a group of students from the University of Illinois at Urbana-Champaign, which included Nick Offerman. The eclectic troupe specialized in productions that emphasized inventive stagecraft, perverse and controversial topics, and skillful stage combat. While the company is highly regarded for original plays such as Action Movie: The Play and Godbaby, Defiant Theatre received notable attention for productions of plays by Caryl Churchill, Alfred Jarry, Sarah Kane, and William Shakespeare. Chicago Magazine named Defiant the "Best Experimental Theatre" in their August 1999 Best of Chicago issue. The company disbanded in 2004.

== Production history ==
=== 1993/1994 season ===
==== Hamlet ====
by William Shakespeare
directed by Christopher Johnson
Opened Friday, November 19, 1993 at The Greenview Arts Center

"Rosencrantz and Guildenstern may be dead; Defiant Theatre's Hamlet most certainly is not." - Chicago Reader

==== Landscape of the Body ====
by John Guare
directed by Darren Critz
Opened Friday, February 11, 1994 at American Theater Company

==== The Quarantine ====
by Darren Critz
directed by Joe Foust
CHICAGO PREMIERE
at Strawdog Theatre Company

"Defiant Theatre has come up with some splendidly gruesome, darkly comic stage images... Defiant Theatre is clearly a company to keep an eye on." - Chicago Reader

=== 1994/1995 season ===
==== The Dumb Waiter/Victoria Station ====
by Harold Pinter
The Dumb Waiter directed by Joe Foust
Victoria Station directed by Rob Kimmel
at Angel Island

"Kindles with riveting slowness to a small but triumphant climax." - Chicago Reader

==== Women and Water ====
by John Guare
directed by Darren Critz
at American Theater Company

"What is most thrilling about this production is how well it reveals the subtleties of Guare's play." - Chicago Reader

==== Apt Pupil ====
based on the novella by Stephen King
adapted and directed by Christopher Johnson
WORLD PREMIERE
Opened Thursday, May 4, 1995 at The Preston Bradley Center

"It's given me vivid nightmares for the past two nights (and counting)." - Chicago Reader

=== 1996 season ===
==== The Ugly Man ====
by Brad Fraser
directed by Linda Gillum & Barb Wruck Thometz
CHICAGO PREMIERE
Opened Saturday, January 13, 1996 at Strawdog Theatre Company

"The Defiant production has just the right tone." - Chicago Tribune

==== Ubu Raw ====
based upon Alfred Jarry's Ubu Roi
adapted by Joe Foust & Richard Ragsdale
directed by Joe Foust
WORLD PREMIERE
Opened Saturday, June 1, 1996 at American Theater Company

"The most sensational off-Loop show to hit the stage in a very long time... The production is truly remarkable." - Chicago Tribune

"Breathtaking disregard for their own safety." - Chicago Reader

==== Red Dragon ====
based upon the novel by Thomas Harris
adapted and directed by Christopher Johnson
WORLD PREMIERE
Opened Wednesday, October 23, 1996 at The Firehouse

=== 1997 season ===
==== The Mystery of Irma Vep ====
by Charles Ludlam
directed by Jim Slonina
Opened Monday, May 5, 1997 at National Pastime Theater

==== Caligula ====
by Albert Camus
directed by Richard Ragsdale
Opened Monday, July 21, 1997 at The Griffin Theatre

==== The Skriker ====
by Caryl Churchill
directed by Linda Gillum
CHICAGO PREMIERE
Opened Monday, October 13, 1997 at American Theater Company

"An ensemble work in every aspect... They've put on one hell of a show." - Chicago Tribune

=== 1998 season ===
==== Phaedra's Love ====
by Sarah Kane
directed by Lisa Rothschiller
AMERICAN PREMIERE
Opened Wednesday, June 10, 1998 at American Theater Company

"It's punk, pulp fiction classicism, whipped into a frenzy in a tight, stylish production." - Chicago Reader

==== Action Movie: The Play ====
by Joe Foust & Richard Ragsdale
directed by Joe Foust
WORLD PREMIERE
Opened Wednesday, July 22, 1998 at American Theater Company

"Unforgettable theatrical thrills." - Chicago Tribune

"A visceral, confrontational theatergoing experience... The company has managed to put all the blockbuster films this summer to shame." - Chicago Reader

==== Dracula ====
by Mac Wellman
directed by Richard Ragsdale
CHICAGO PREMIERE
Opened Monday, October 5, 1998 at Charybdis Multi-Arts Complex

"Defiant gives the script's malevolent camp a pointed recklessness." - Chicago Reader

=== 1999 season ===
==== Bluebeard ====
by Charles Ludlam
directed by Jim Slonina
Opened Thursday, March 11, 1999 at Victory Gardens Theater Downstairs Studio

"Gleefully indulges Ludlam's cheese-ball side... Gloriously awful." - Chicago Reader

==== Action Movie: The Play: The Director's Cut ====
by Joe Foust & Richard Ragsdale
directed by Joe Foust
Opened Wednesday, June 16, 1999 at American Theater Company

"The play's endless stunts are just as brilliantly executed and breathtaking as they were before." - Chicago Reader

==== Burning Desires ====
by Joan Schenkar
directed by Linda Gillum
MIDWEST PREMIERE
Opened Wednesday, November 3, 1999 at National Pastime Theater

=== 2000 season ===
==== The Love Talker ====
by Deborah Pryor
directed by Richard Ragsdale
at Victory Gardens Theater Downstairs Studio

==== Godbaby ====
by Christopher Johnson
directed by Jim Slonina
WORLD PREMIERE
Opened Friday, June 16, 2000 at American Theater Company

==== Macbeth ====
by William Shakespeare
directed by Christopher Johnson
Opened Friday, October 27, 2000 at The Viaduct

=== 2001 season ===
==== Cleansed ====
by Sarah Kane
directed by Lisa Rothschiller
AMERICAN PREMIERE
Opened Friday, March 16, 2001 at The Viaduct

==== Fortinbras ====
by Lee Blessing
directed by Justin Fletcher
Opened Friday, September 14, 2001 at The Viaduct

==== Sci-fi Action Movie in Space Prison ====
written and directed by Joe Foust
WORLD PREMIERE
Opened Saturday, December 8, 2001 at American Theater Company

=== 2002 season ===
==== Flaming Guns of the Purple Sage ====
by Jane Martin
directed by Linda Gillum
CHICAGO PREMIERE
Opened Friday, March 29, 2002 at The Viaduct

==== Dope ====
by Christopher Johnson
directed by Christopher Johnson & Jim Slonina
WORLD PREMIERE
Opened Friday, July 5, 2002 at American Theater Company

==== Nicholas DeBeaubien's The Hunchback of Notre Dame ====
by John Kohler, Larry Larson, Levi Lee and Rebecca Wackler
directed by Jim Slonina
MIDWEST PREMIERE
Opened Thursday, September 12, 2002 at A Red Orchid Theatre

=== 2003 season ===
==== Titus Andronicus ====
by William Shakespeare
directed by Christopher Johnson
Opened Friday, January 17, 2003 at The Viaduct

==== Defiant Fabulon ====
featuring Fabulon Historifarcicon
by Christopher Johnson
directed by Jim Slonina
Opened Friday, August 8, 2003 at The Viaduct

==== Dracula ====
by Steven Dietz
adapted from the novel by Bram Stoker
directed by Richard Ragsdale
Opened Sunday, October 12, 2003 at The Vittum Theatre

"Defiant Theatre, not a troupe to shy away from the eek, the ook or even the odd "uck," has a spirited blood-sucker now on display, just in time for Halloween." - Chicago Tribune

=== 2004 season ===
==== Action Movie: The Play ====
by Joe Foust & Richard Ragsdale
directed by Joe Foust
Opened Sunday, April 18, 2004 at The Chopin Theatre

==== The Pyrates ====
based on the novel by George MacDonald Fraser
adapted by Justin Fletcher & Richard Ragsdale
directed by Justin Fletcher
Opened Sunday, June 27, 2004 at The Chopin Theatre

==== A Clockwork Orange ====
by Anthony Burgess
adapted from his novel
directed by Christopher Johnson
Opened Thursday, September 9, 2004 at Gallery 37's Storefront Theater

== Awards ==
=== 1996 ===
Ubu Raw
After Dark Award

- Overall Technical Achievement

=== 1997 ===
Red Dragon
Joseph Jefferson Citations

- Original Adaptation - Christopher Johnson
- Actor in a Principal Role - Christopher Thometz
- Sound Design - Brian & Matthew Callahan
- Original Music - Sean Sinitski

=== 1998 ===
The Skriker
Joseph Jefferson Citations

- Costume Design - Carol Cox, Jennifer Keller, Sarah Laleman, Beth Nowak, Christine Pascual
- Puppetry and Masks - B. Emil Boulos, Joe Foust, Andrew Leman, Nick Offerman, Sean Sinitski, Christopher Thometz

After Dark Award

- Overall Technical Achievement

Action Movie: The Play
After Dark Awards

- Sound Design - Gregor Mortis, Greg Nishimura, Prank, Sean Sinitski
- Direction - Joe Foust

=== 2001 ===
Cleansed
After Dark Awards

- Direction - Lisa Rothschiller
- Outstanding Ensemble

=== 2002 ===
Fortinbras
Joseph Jefferson Citation

- Actor in a Supporting Role - Jim Slonina

Flaming Guns of the Purple Sage
After Dark Award

- Outstanding Production

=== 2005 ===
Action Movie: The Play
Joseph Jefferson Citations

- Outstanding Ensemble
- Sound Design - Gregor Mortis
- Fight Choreography - Joe Foust & Geoff Coates
