= Flashman in the Great Game =

1975 novel by George MacDonald Fraser

- First edition cover
- Author: George MacDonald Fraser
- Cover artist: Arthur Barbosa
- Language: English
- Genre: Historical novel
- Publisher: Barrie & Jenkins
- Publication date: 1975
- Publication place: United Kingdom
- Media type: Print (Hardback & Paperback)
- Pages: 336
- ISBN: 0-214-20120-1
- OCLC: 2006145
- Dewey Decimal: 823/.9/14
- LC Class: PZ4.F8418 Fn PR6056.R287
- Preceded by: Flashman at the Charge
- Followed by: Flashman's Lady

Flashman in the Great Game is a 1975 historical novel by George MacDonald Fraser. It is the fifth of the Flashman novels.

== Plot introduction ==
Presented within the frame of the supposedly discovered historical Flashman Papers, this book describes the bully Flashman from Tom Brown's School Days. The papers are attributed to Flashman, who is not only the bully featured in Thomas Hughes' novel, but also a well-known Victorian military hero. The book begins with an explanatory note detailing the discovery of these papers. Fraser also states he has received communications from people either claiming to be a descendant of Flashman or of someone to whom Flashman owed money.

Flashman in the Great Game begins with Flashman at Balmoral as a guest of Queen Victoria. Here he meets with Lord Palmerston, who recruits him to go to Jhansi in India and investigate rumours of an upcoming rebellion among the Sepoys. Flashman skulks through India in various disguises, narrowly avoiding death several times and witnessing first-hand the carnage of the Sepoy Mutiny. Flashman in the Great Game covers the years 1856 to 1858. It also contains a number of notes by Fraser, in the guise of editor, giving additional historical information on the events described.

== Plot summary ==
Flashman not only encounters Lord Palmerston at Balmoral, but also his old nemesis Nicholas Pavlovich Ignatiev. He escapes assassination narrowly and journeys to Jhansi in India, where he meets Rani Lakshmi Bai, the beautiful queen. He listens to her grievances against the British Raj and attempts to seduce her. Whether or not he is successful is unclear, but immediately afterwards Flashman is nearly garroted by Thuggees. In disguise as Makarram Khan, a Hasanzai of the Black Mountain, he takes refuge in the native cavalry at Meerut. Meerut is where the Sepoy Mutiny begins.

Flashman survives the Siege of Cawnpore and the Siege of Lucknow but ends up imprisoned in Gwalior after an attempt to deliver Lakshmi into British hands. He is released just in time to witness the death of Lakshmi, but then his appearance after two months in prison leads to his misidentification as a mutineer. After being knocked out during the British attack on the Rani's camp, he awakens to something that makes Hugh Rose later wonder that Flashman did not lose his mind - he is gagged and tied to the muzzle of a cannon, about to be executed with other mutineers. Quick thinking allows him to communicate with gestures his true ethnicity to his British captors. In an uncharacteristically humane act, he orders the Indian mutineers who were going to be blown away alongside him, to be freed saying "the way things are hereabouts, one of 'em's probably Lord Canning." In this book Flashman often behaves heroically, though his interior thoughts are often - but not always - those of a coward and a cad.

== Victoria Cross and knighthood ==
At the end of the book Flashman receives the Victoria Cross and finds out he is to be knighted, continuing his knack for being rewarded for heroics despite his efforts to avoid doing anything dangerous. However, his attempt to sneak into Jhansi to convince the Rani to surrender is an act of bravery (and he is nearly killed for his efforts). He also took part in some of the most terrifying actions of the mutiny and even took to defending Cawnpore during the siege. Therefore, this is the first time that one could argue, he did in fact deserve the Victoria Cross and his knighthood, not only for the feats of (unintentional) bravery, but for the horrors he was forced to endure and the initiative he showed in trying to complete his mission. At the end of the book he finds out that he is described—in the recently published book Tom Brown's School Days—as a bully and a coward.

== Characters ==
=== Fictional characters ===
- Flashman: The hero or anti-hero.
- Elspeth: His adoring and possibly unfaithful wife.
- Ilderim Khan: His old Afghan blood brother from Flashman. Killed by sepoys during the retreat from Cawnpore.
- Scud East: His old schoolmate who dies at Cawnpore.
- James Kane Rowbotham: A British civilian who leads his own group of vigilantes to lynch Indians suspected of being mutineers. He and his group are killed by the mutineers at the Siege of Cawnpore.
- Rowbotham's Moss-troopers (Cheeseman, O'Toole, Fields, Jinks): A group of vigilantes led by James Rowbotham. Only about twenty of them survive the attempt to reach Cawnpore.
- Mrs Leslie: A woman attached to the Meerut garrison with whom Flashman, in his disguise as Makkaram Khan, has an affair. Killed by sepoys during the Meerut Massacre.

=== Historical characters ===
Indians

- Rani Lakshmi Bai: Queen of Jhansi. Flashman becomes acquainted with in a way other Westerners failed and ultimately (possibly) seduces her.
- Nana Sahib: One of the leaders of the Sepoy Mutiny. Flashman meets him at the Siege of Cawnpore.
- Tantya Tope: One of the leaders of the Sepoy Mutiny. Flashman meets him at the Siege of Cawnpore.
- Azimullah Khan: One of the leaders of the Sepoy Mutiny. Flashman meets him at the Siege of Cawnpore.

British civilians

- Queen Victoria
- Prince Albert
- Lord Palmerston: Prime Minister of the United Kingdom. Flashman calls him both "an impatient old tyrant" and a "decent, kindly old sport at bottom".
- Lord Ellenborough: Former Governor-General of India
- Thomas Hughes, author of Tom Brown's School Days. Flashman meets him before the publication of that book, in which he is not portrayed in a complimentary manner.
- Thomas Henry Kavanagh: The Irishman who slipped out of Lucknow in disguise and met up with Campbell to guide him in to relieve the besieged garrison. Flashman accompanies him and gets him out of a few jams along the way. Flashman considers him to be a blundering idiot, but also says "anyone who's as big a bloody fool as that, and goes gallivanting about seeking sorrow, must be called courageous."
- Florence Nightingale: Flashman sits in at a meeting with her and Queen Victoria and answers her questions about soldiers and social infections. He finds her attractive, but the presence of the queen keeps him from taking "a squeeze at her".
- William Howard Russell: A reporter with The Times. Considered to be one of the first modern war correspondents.
- Charles Wood: First Lord of the Admiralty

British soldiers

- Sam Browne
- Lord Cardigan. National hero, former commander of the Light Brigade during the Crimean War, and no friend of Flashman.
- Colin Campbell: British General who relieves the Siege of Lucknow. Flashman says "he was an ugly old devil, with a damned caustic tongue and a graveyard sense of humour, but I never saw a man yet who made me feel more secure."
- Lord Canning Governor General of India at the time of the Mutiny.
- Henry Havelock: British General who recaptures Cawnpore. Flashman describes him as looking like "Abraham Lincoln dying of diarrhoea, with his mournful whiskers and bloodhound eyes".
- James Hope Grant
- Clement Walker Heneage
- Harry Hammon Lyster
- John Moore: British Major, killed in action at the Siege of Cawnpore.
- General John Nicholson: Officer of the East India Company. Flashman meets him on his way to Jhansi, and Nicholson insists on praying with him. Later, he is killed at Delhi.
- Robert Napier
- James Outram: British General who helps recapture Lucknow. Then he selects Flashman to accompany Thomas Kavanagh on his hazardous mission.
- Lord George Paget
- Fred Roberts
- William Stephen Raikes Hodson
- Hugh Rose
- Mowbray Thomson: British officer at the Siege of Cawnpore. One of a handful of survivors of the Satichaura Ghat massacre, who escapes down the River Ganges with Flashman.
- Hugh Wheeler: British General who commands the garrison during the siege of Cawnpore

Other

- Nicholas Pavlovich Ignatieff: Flashman's nemesis from Flashman at the Charge. He turns up at Balmoral as a Russian diplomat.
