= Black Ajax =

1997 novel by George MacDonald Fraser

- First edition
- Author: George MacDonald Fraser
- Language: English
- Genre: historical
- Publisher: HarperCollins
- Publication date: 1997
- Publication place: United Kingdom

Black Ajax is a historical novel by George MacDonald Fraser based on the career of Tom Molineaux. It is set during the Regency era. The father of Harry Flashman appears as a major character although the book is not part of the official Flashman series.

As in those novels, several real life characters are depicted including:

- Tom Molineaux
- Bill Richmond
- Tom Cribb
- George IV
- Beau Brummel
- Pierce Egan
- Harriette Wilson
- Henry Somerset, 7th Duke of Beaufort
