= Mr American =

1980 novel by George MacDonald Fraser

- First edition
- Author: George MacDonald Fraser
- Language: English
- Genre: Historical novel
- Publisher: Collins
- Publication date: 1980
- Publication place: United Kingdom
- Media type: Print (hardback & paperback)
- Pages: 304 pp (paperback edition)
- ISBN: 0-00-647018-1
- OCLC: 35134967

Mr American is a 1980 novel by George MacDonald Fraser, who described it as longer and more "conventional" than his usual work.

== Plot summary ==
Mark Franklin arrives on the Mauretania at Liverpool in 1909 with a copy of Shakespeare's works, an old Mexican charro saddle and two Remington pistols in his battered luggage. A tall and softly-spoken American prospector, who made his fortune in a silver strike in Nevada, he is visiting the 'old country' to see his roots.

He goes to London where he meets and has a one-night stand with 'Pip' Delys, a music hall performer. She gives him the name which forms the title of the book. He then buys a house in Castle Lancing, the Norfolk village his ancestors came from in the 17th century. A chance event during a fox hunt, when the fox hides in Franklin's picnic basket, leads to an acquaintance with King Edward VII, and the beginning of an enmity with a neighbour (Frank, Lord Lacy) which lasts throughout the book.

Through playing bridge with Edward and his mistress Alice Keppel, Franklin elevates himself greatly in the king's estimation through his easy manners.

When the king invites him to Sandringham, Franklin meets Winston Churchill, Jackie Fisher, and Ernest Cassel. This allows Fraser to depict some of the historical background of the build-up to the First World War. He also meets General Flashman, from Fraser's well-known historical fiction series. Flashman is in his late 80s at the start of the book (as he says, "I'm eighty-eight next May, and I attribute my longevity to an almost total abstinence from tea"), and an important sub-plot involves his grandniece, Lady Helen Cessford, a suffragette.

An old partner in crime, Kid Curry, tracks him down and demands half of all his wealth. Franklin refuses, and the stage is set for a midnight gunfight, which Franklin wins with the assistance of his manservant Samson. They bury the body in a field.

He falls in love with, and marries, another neighbour, Peggy Clayton. Her brother is an officer in the British Army and is involved in running guns to Ireland during the Curragh Mutiny, using Franklin's money obtained by Peggy from him by deception.

Over the years, Franklin gradually grows apart from his young wife, at first due to the breach of trust over the money, and then when he discovers her sexual infidelity. The novel ends with the outbreak of war in 1914, and Franklin deciding to return to the US, leaving the bulk of his fortune in England for his wife and her family. At the last moment, he changes his mind, and the reader is left unsure whether he intends to return to his unfaithful wife, to possibly accompany Samson who plans to serve in the Legion of Frontiersmen under Frederick Selous, or something else entirely.

== Reception ==
The Guardian said the book "bulges with period research but without the familiar knockabout uplift. Flashy makes an appearance, a ghost of his old reprobate self, and if this is the last of him, I salute him but not, I fear, his successor."

== Proposed adaptation ==
In 1983 Sir Lew Grade announced he would make the book as an eight-hour miniseries. No miniseries has resulted.
