= Tom Cribb =

English bare-knuckle boxer (1781–1848)

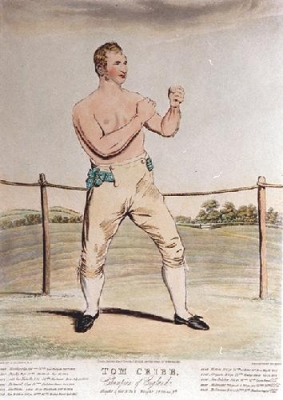

Personal information
- Born: 8 July 1781 Hanham
- Died: 11 May 1848 (aged 66) London
- Height: 5 ft 9 in (175 cm)
- Weight: 189–199 lb (86–90 kg)

Boxing career

Boxing record
- Wins: 15
- Losses: 0
- No contests: 1

Tom Cribb (8 July 1781 – 11 May 1848) was an English bare-knuckle boxer of the 19th century. He was All England Champion from 1808 to 1822.

== Early life ==
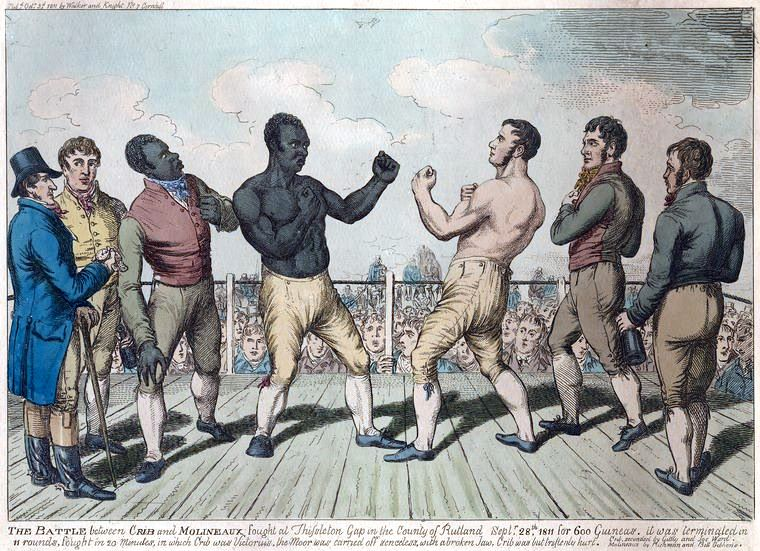
Tom Cribb vs Tom Molineaux, 1811

Born in Hanham near Bristol, Cribb moved to London at the age of 13 and after working as a bell-hanger sought work as a coal porter in Wapping.

== Boxing career ==
His first fight was with George Maddox on 7 January 1805 at Wood Green in Middlesex, now part of north London. Victory over Maddox, followed by another over Tom Blake a month later, persuaded him to become a professional pugilist, under the supervision of Captain Robert Barclay.

George Nicholls was the only fighter to defeat Cribb, on 20 July 1805. Later, the foremost prizefighting reporter, Pierce Egan, stated that he was aware that some "friends of the CHAMPION" had encouraged the myth that Cribb enjoyed an unbeaten career by "withholding the name of his vanquisher" (Boxiana, vol. 1).

On 8 April 1807 Cribb beat Jem Belcher (who had been English champion from 1800 to 1805). The fight lasted 44 rounds and took place at Moulsey Hurst, the major prizefighting venue at the time. Following the retirement of reigning champion John Gully, Cribb fought Bob Gregson in October 1808 to determine the new English champion. This fight also took place at Moulsey Hurst and resulted in a win for Cribb in 23 rounds. Cribb then defended his title successfully at Epsom Downs Racecourse in a second bout against Jem Belcher on 1 February 1809.

On 18 December 1810 he fought an American, former slave Tom Molineaux, at Copthorne Common in Sussex. Cribb beat Molineaux in 35 rounds. The fight was controversial for two reasons: Molineaux was injured when the crowd invaded the ring, and Cribb at one point seemed to have taken longer than the specified time to return to the centre of the ring. Cribb then faced Molineaux again in 1811, beating him at Thistleton Gap in Rutland in 11 rounds.

Having beaten Gregson, Belcher and Molineaux, Cribb's reputation was so high that he received no further challenges for a further eleven years, and eventually retired from the ring in 1822. Dowling (1841) records that 'On 15 May 1822, Cribb publicly resigned the championship on the stage of the Fives Court, on which occasion he was presented with a belt, and was succeeded by Tom Spring'.

== After retirement ==
Cribb became a coal merchant (and part-time boxing trainer). Later he worked as a pub landlord, running the Union Arms, Panton Street, close to Haymarket in central London.

In 1839 he relocated to Woolwich in south-east London, where he died in 1848, aged 66. He was buried in the churchyard of St Mary Magdalene, Woolwich – where a monument to his memory was erected.

== Legacy ==
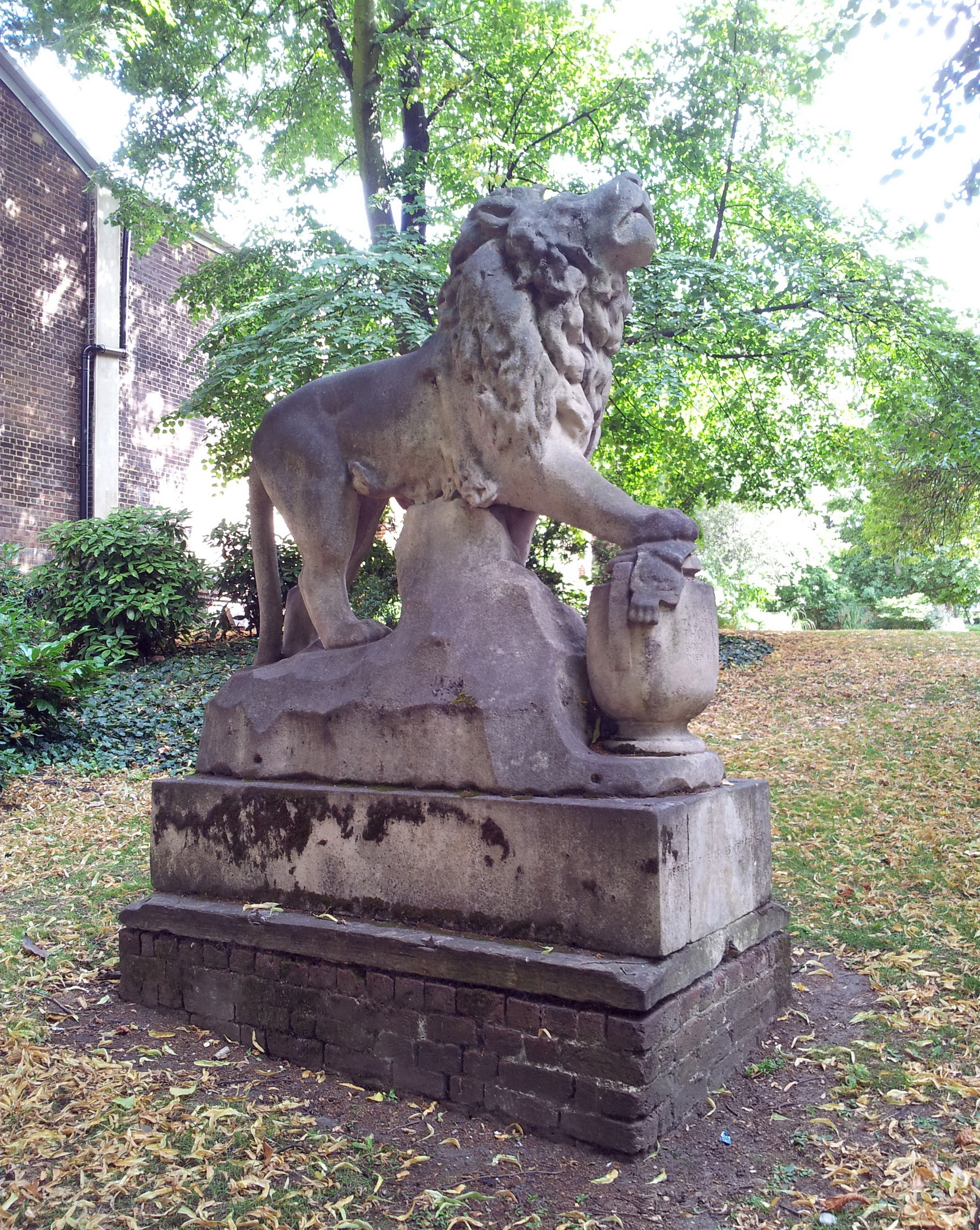
Tom Cribb's tomb in Woolwich

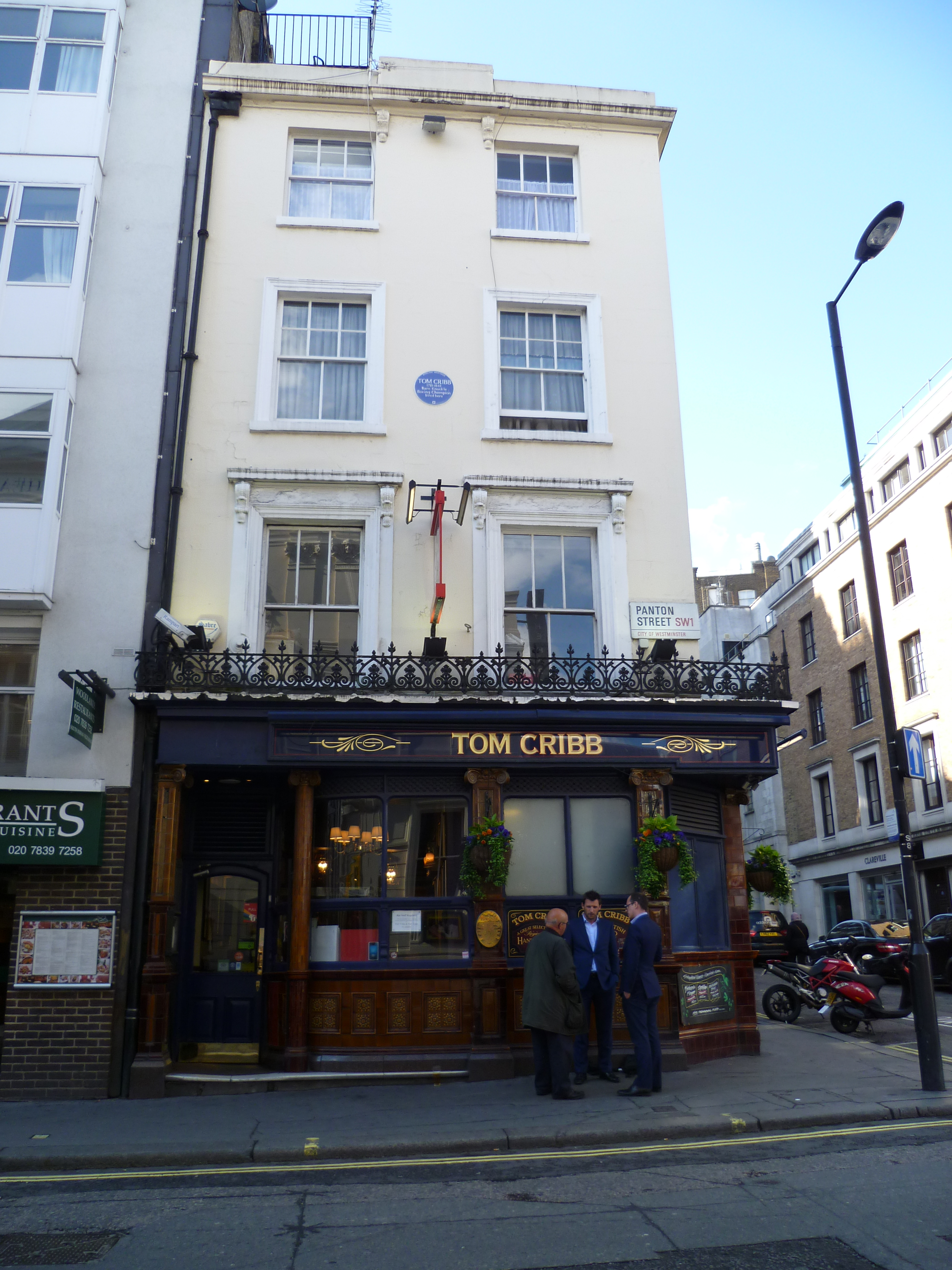
The Tom Cribb pub, London

Cribb's tomb, in the shape of a lion resting his paw on an urn, still stands in St Mary's Gardens in Woolwich. Also in Woolwich, a road in the Royal Arsenal area has been named in his honour.

The Tom Cribb pub is located at 36 Panton Street, St James, London. This is the same address as the Union Arms, which was originally 26 Panton Street, but later renumbered.

There is a popular local legend in the Bristol area that Cribbs Causeway, a road not far from Hanham that has given its name to a major out-of-town retail park and entertainment complex, was named after Tom Cribb. Despite being proved to be false, this has not stopped the legend from continuing.

An English footwear brand named after Thomas Cribb existed between 2003 and 2007. The brand name "Thomas Cribb" is currently registered to the creators of the brand.

=== Dramatic and literary references ===
Tom Hyer, the first recognised American heavyweight champion, portrayed the character "Tom Cribb" in a scene from Pierce Egan's Tom and Jerry, or Life in London during a single performance at the National Theatre (Boston, Massachusetts) on 9 March 1849.

Cribb features prominently in George MacDonald Fraser’s novel Black Ajax, a fictionalised account of Tom Molineaux's life. In Charles Dickens' comic novel Martin Chuzzlewit (ch.9), Cribb is humorously cited as the inventor of a defensive stance used by the boy Bailey, as the landlady Mrs Todgers aims a smack at his head.

Tom Crabbe, a boxer contesting the prize in a game devised in The Will of an Eccentric, a novel by Jules Verne, is evidently inspired by Tom Cribb.

Cribb and Molineux are mentioned in the opening chapter of "War of the Roses" by Warren Adler. In the novel, the boxers had been immortalized in a pair of small Staffordshire porcelain figures, and the ill-fated couple bid against each other to obtain the figures during an estate auction.

Cribb is noted in one episode ("The Detective Wore Silk Drawers" - largely centred on prize-fighting) of the first series of Granada Television's Victorian crime drama Cribb, in which one of Cribb's men speculates whether he is descended from the famous boxer.

Cribb's fights with Molineaux, was turned into a 2014 play by Ed Viney called Prize Fighters.

Cribb is also mentioned in the novel Mauler by Shawn Williamson. He appears to introduce the exotic Tasmanian Tiger (thylacine), the hero of the story, also known as Mauler and Cu´chulain.

Cribb is memorialised in The Letter of Marque, 12th in the Aubrey-Maturin series of novels by Patrick O'Brian. In the novel, one of the captain's favorite personal long cannons is named "Tom Cribb".

Georgette Heyer's 1935 novel, Regency Buck, opens with Cribb's fight with Molineaux at Thistleton Gap in Rutland in 1811.

== References and sources ==
Sources

- Dowling, Frank Lewis (1841), Fistiana, or the Oracle of the Ring.
- Hurley, John (2009). Tom Cribb: The Life of The Black Diamond. Stroud: The History Press. ISBN 978-0-7524-4751-3.
- Lobel, Mary D and Crossley, Alan (Eds.) (1969). Victoria County History: A History of the County of Oxford: Volume 9. pp. 171–188.
- Miles, Henry Downes (1906). Pugilistica: the history of British boxing containing lives of the most celebrated pugilists. Vol. 1. Edinburgh: J.Grant. pp. 242–277.
- Snowdon, David (2013), Writing the Prizefight: Pierce Egan's Boxiana World, Bern.
- Stephen, Leslie, ed. (1888). "Cribb, Tom" . Dictionary of National Biography. Vol. 13. London: Smith, Elder & Co.
