= The Hollywood History of the World =

- Author: George MacDonald Fraser
- Language: English
- Publication date: 1988; 1996 (rev. ed.)
- Publication place: United Kingdom

The Hollywood History of the World is a 1988 book about historical movies written by George MacDonald Fraser.

Fraser said he was inspired to write the book when it occurred to him that "in a way, Hollywood has been a great historical educator, because if you or I or anyone else thinks of ancient Rome, you probably think of something you've seen in the movies. Who would know what the Romans wore or looked like or a chariot race looked like if they hadn't seen Ben Hur? Who would know what a Philistine temple looked like if Victor Mature hadn't pushed one over? I think we get more vivid pictures of history from the movies than we ever get from histories. Sometimes there are minor distortions, sometimes there are major distortions, but one can be pretty sure the background detail has been accurately researched."

It divides films into seven main "ages":

- The Ancient World (films discussed include One Million Years B.C., Ben-Hur (1959), Cleopatra (1963), The Robe, Demetrius and the Gladiators, The Fall of the Roman Empire);
- Knights and Barbarians (The Vikings, Becket, The Lion in Winter, Macbeth (1948), The Adventures of Robin Hood);
- Tudors and Sea-Dogs (The Private Life of Henry VIII, Fire Over England, The Sea Hawk (1940));
- Romance and Royalty (Scaramouche (1952), Waterloo (1970));
- Rule Britannia (Sanders of the River, Lives of a Bengal Lancer, The Drum, The Four Feathers (1939), North West Frontier, Zulu);
- New World, Old West (Western Union, True Grit (1969), My Darling Clementine); and
- The Violent Century (All Quiet on the Western Front (1930), The Way Ahead, Mrs. Miniver, Platoon, Full Metal Jacket).

It was republished in 1996, adding entries on films such as Braveheart, Last of the Mohicans (1992), and Rob Roy (1995).

== Portraits ==
The book is notable for its juxtaposition of historical portraits against those of the actors who portrayed the subjects, with Fraser frequently offering comments about how well the likeness has been achieved, as in the following from the 1970 film Cromwell:

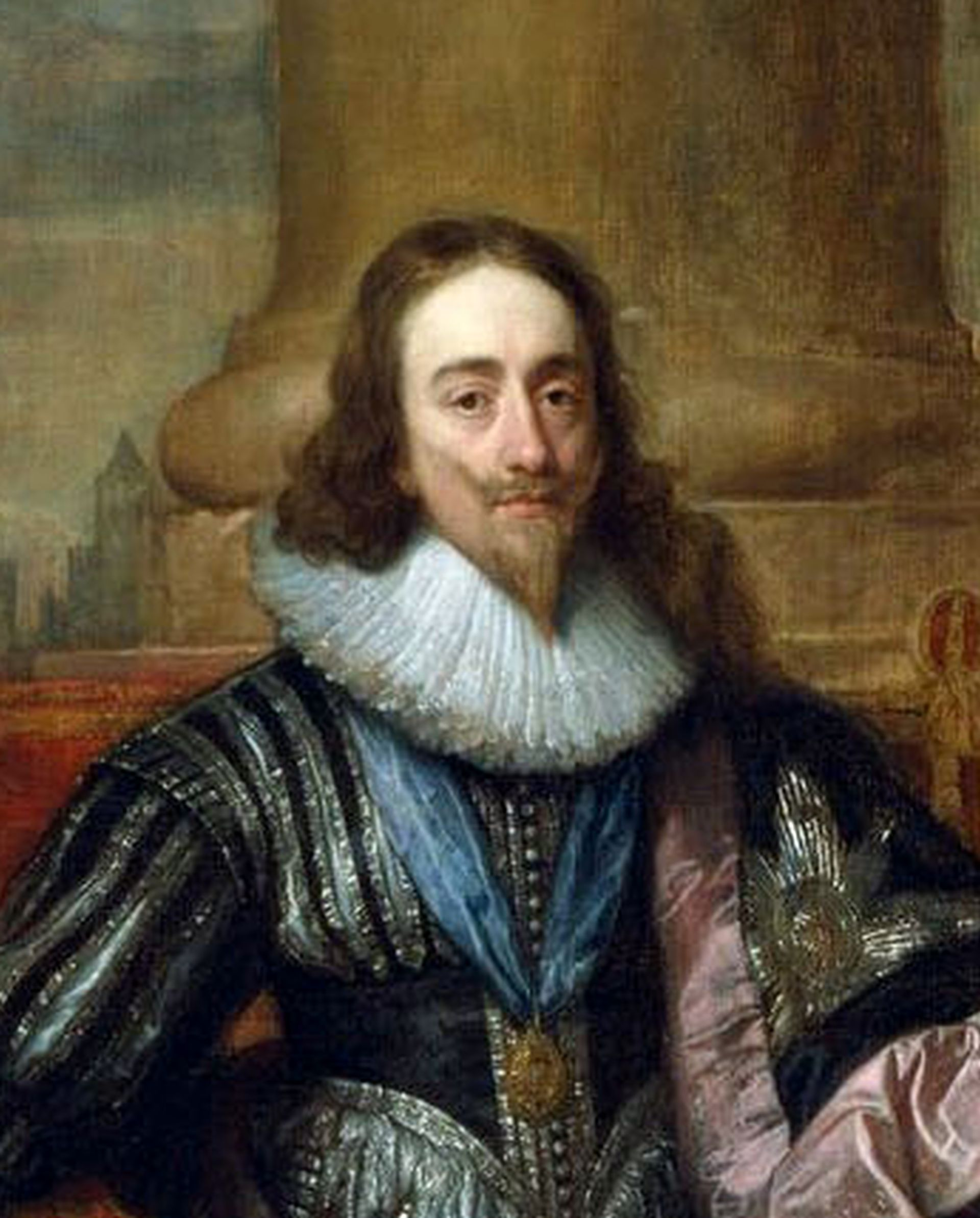
Charles I, as painted by Sir Anthony van Dyck, was portrayed by Alec Guinness: "Perhaps the best living image ever presented in a historical film; he is Van Dyck's portraits come to life, and if some expert points out that he is slightly too tall, he doesn't look it".

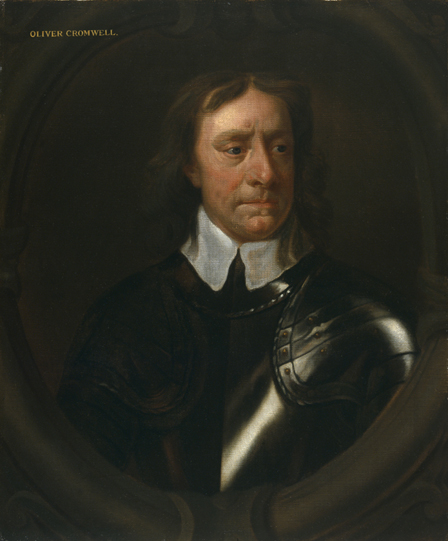
Oliver Cromwell, as painted by Peter Lely, was portrayed by Richard Harris: "He looks nothing like, and can give no believable impression of, that plain, burly, enigmatic Englishman who stares so enigmatically out of his portraits."
