= Royal Flash (film) =

1975 British adventure comedy film

- US film poster
- Directed by: Richard Lester
- Screenplay by: George MacDonald Fraser
- Based on: Royal Flash by George MacDonald Fraser
- Produced by: David V. Picker; Denis O'Dell
- Starring: Malcolm McDowell; Alan Bates; Florinda Bolkan; Oliver Reed; Tom Bell; Joss Ackland; Lionel Jeffries; Alastair Sim; Michael Hordern; Britt Ekland
- Cinematography: Geoffrey Unsworth
- Edited by: John Victor-Smith
- Production company: Two Roads Productions
- Distributed by: 20th Century Fox
- Release dates: 15 August 1975 (London); 11 October 1975 (UK)
- Running time: 102 minutes
- Country: United Kingdom
- Language: English
- Budget: $4.4 million
- Box office: $1.6 million

Royal Flash is a 1975 British adventure comedy film directed by Richard Lester and starring Malcolm McDowell, Oliver Reed, Alan Bates and Florinda Bolkan. It was written by George MacDonald Fraser based on his 1970 Flashman novel of the same name.

Though it received mixed reviews for its performances and action scenes, Royal Flash had only a limited release in cinemas.

== Plot ==
The film begins with Flashman making a patriotic speech to the boys of Rugby School framed by a giant Union Jack, in a scene which appears to be a parody of the opening sequence in the 1970 film Patton. There is a brief flashback to the events of the original Flashman, with the head of Rugby School recounting Flashman's exploits in Afghanistan.

The film then follows the plot of the book, which itself largely derives from The Prisoner of Zenda.Flashman is forced by Otto von Bismarck to impersonate a Danish prince, who is about to marry a German princess. Bismarck exacts this retribution partly in revenge for his humiliation at the hands of Flashman in London; Flashman stole Bismarck's mistress Lola Montez, then manoeuvred him into boxing against a professional boxer, John Gully, at a house party. Bismarck does not wish the Princess to marry a Dane, since this may tilt the balance on the Schleswig-Holstein Question and interfere with his plans for a united Germany.

== Cast ==
- Malcolm McDowell as Captain Harry Flashman
- Alan Bates as Rudi Von Sternberg
- Florinda Bolkan as Lola Montez
- Oliver Reed as Otto von Bismarck
- Tom Bell as De Gautet
- Joss Ackland as Sapten
- Christopher Cazenove as Eric Hansen
- Henry Cooper as John Gully, M.P.
- Lionel Jeffries as Kraftstein
- Alastair Sim as Mr Greig
- Michael Hordern as headmaster
- Britt Ekland as Duchess Irma
- Richard Pearson as Duchy Chamberlain
- Alan Howard as Ducky Chamberlain
- Bob Hoskins as Police Constable
- Richard Hurndall as Detchard
- Arthur Brough as King Ludwig of Bavaria
- Elizabeth Larner as Baroness Pechman
- Margaret Courtenay as Soprano
- Stuart Rayner as Speedicut
- Leon Greene as Grundwig
- David Jason as The Mayor
- Noel Johnson as Lord Chamberlain
- Ben Aris as Fireman
- Rula Lenska as Helga
- Bob Peck as Police Inspector
- John Stuart as English General
- Frank Grimes as Lieutenant
- Paul Burton as Tom Brown
- Tessa Dahl as 1st girl
- Claire Russell as 2nd girl
- Kubi Chaza as Lucy
- David Sterne as policeman
- Meg Davis as barmaid
- Roger Hammond as master

== Production ==
Flashman, the first novel of The Flashman Papers series, had been published in 1968 and attracted the interest of film producers. At one stage Richard Lester was to direct, but the necessary financing could not be secured. However, Lester enjoyed the novel and then hired George MacDonald Fraser to adapt The Three Musketeers for two successful films in the early 1970s. This enabled Lester to obtain finance for a Flashman film.

Royal Flash was the second Flashman novel, and had been published in 1970. The New York Times said "Mr MacDonald Fraser has considerable narrative skill... most ingeniously plotted and often hilariously funny."

Lester said he did not want to film the first novel as "after putting so much work into it originally, I felt that I'd already made the film, even though it had never reached the shooting stage. It was dead." Lester admitted the second novel was "simpler to film in many ways. You might call it Adventures of Harry Flashman, Otto von Bismark and Lola Montez." Diabolique argued the second novel was chosen for filming as opposed to the first because it would be less expensive, and the basic storyline had been successfully used before.

The film was one of the first produced by executive David Picker following his resignation from being head of United Artists in 1973. He had just made Juggernaut with Lester.

In 1969 John Alderton had been cast as Flashman but David Picker wanted a better known actor in the lead. Malcolm McDowell was cast.

Lester did not want the film to look too close to the Musketeers movies so he used a new production designer and cinematographer. Just prior to filming, Picker and United Artists withdrew finance, but Twentieth Century Fox – who had distributed the Musketeers films – stepped in instead.

The film was shot partly on location in Bavaria. Lester said the film "was hell to make, not because of the actors - I liked the cast very much - but let's say I was less happy with the crew. I think Germany was a difficult place to film in."

The film was cut from 118 minutes to 102 minutes prior to release. Among the scenes lost were flashbacks to Flashman's life at school, and the entire role of Roy Kinnear.

Lester said the film was "generally ignored and considered to be a substandard version of The Three Musketeers. It was perhaps a poor choice of mine to pursue because it was a period film, a comic romp with some serious overtones and a lot of swordplay and it did come after Musketeers which was a well loved piece of subject matter."

Lester also felt "that equivocal anti hero wasn't easy to take. They wanted a real hero, a hero that was a bounder as well as a hero. And Malcolm McDowell was absolutely 100% bounder - the sleaze was coming through to the film."

Despite the film's disappointing reception, Lester said it was one of the few films he made that he liked watching again.

== Reception ==
The Observer said the film "leaves one breathless not so much with enchantment as with boredom".

The Wall Street Journal said it was "disappointing".

Diabolique magazine argued the film suffered from miscasting in key roles, lack of voice over and for perhaps not being the best introduction to Harry Flashman for cinema audiences.

== Home media ==
A UK DVD and Blu-ray was released on 20 May 2013 by Odeon Entertainment. Twilight Time released the film on a limited edition Blu-ray disc in 2013.
