= Flashman and the Redskins =

Novel by George MacDonald Fraser

- First edition
- Author: George MacDonald Fraser
- Cover artist: Arthur Barbosa
- Language: English
- Genre: Historical novel
- Publisher: Collins
- Publication date: 1982
- Publication place: United Kingdom
- Media type: Print (Hardback & Paperback)
- Pages: 512 pp (paperback)
- ISBN: 0-00-721717-X
- OCLC: 67865478
- Preceded by: Flashman's Lady
- Followed by: Flashman and the Dragon

Flashman and the Redskins is a 1982 novel by George MacDonald Fraser. It is the seventh of the Flashman novels.

== Plot introduction ==
Presented within the frame of the supposed discovery of a trunkful of papers detailing the long life and career of a Victorian officer, this series centres around Flashman, the bully from Tom Brown's School Days. The papers are attributed to him, who has grown from the schoolboy of Thomas Hughes's novel into a well-known and much decorated military hero. The book begins with an explanatory note detailing the discovery of these papers.

The story proper begins with Flashman fleeing with Susie Willinck (a New Orleans madam, aka "Miss Susie"), as described at the end of Flash for Freedom!. They cross the continent to join the California Gold Rush, meeting several well-known personalities of the American West in 1849 and 1850. The story resumes in 1875, when he takes part in the Battle of the Little Bighorn the following year. It also contains a number of notes by Fraser, in the guise of editor, giving additional historical information on the events described.

== Plot summary ==
In his haste to leave New Orleans and the threat of imprisonment, Flashman agrees to shepherd Susie Willinck and her company of prostitutes to Sacramento, where she intends to set up shop and make a bundle from gold miners. As wagon captain, Flashman is nominally in charge of his and Susie's (now his wife) collection of women, supplies, sex toys and the other forty-niners and invalids looking for a better life but he depends on the guidance of Richens Lacey Wootton to see them through. Unfortunately, Wootton becomes stricken with cholera. Flashman is left to get everyone to Bent's Fort in safety, which Comanches make difficult for him. Eventually, they reach Santa Fe, New Mexico, where Flashman absconds with two thousand dollars made from selling one of the prostitutes, Cleonie, to Navajos.

For safety in the wilderness, Flashman falls in with a group of travellers but he discovers them to be scalp-hunters, when they attack a band of Apaches. Flashman joins in but refuses to take any scalps or rape captive women, which saves him when the scalp-hunters are killed by the rest of the tribe on their return. He ends up marrying Sonsee-Array, the daughter of chief Mangas Coloradas, and becoming friends with Geronimo. He eventually escapes and is saved by Kit Carson on the Jornada del Muerto.

In 1875 Flashman returns to America with his wife, Elspeth. He meets George Armstrong Custer (whom Flashman had met during the US Civil War) and businesswoman Mrs. Arthur B. Candy, and later travels to Bismarck, North Dakota, to meet with Mrs. Candy and pursue a carnal relationship. However Mrs Candy is revealed to be Cleonie, the former slave girl, who is intent on revenge and at her connivance, he is kidnapped by Sioux and kept captive at Greasy Grass. He escapes just in time to see the defeat and death of Custer—possibly being the one who kills Custer—and to be partly scalped himself by his own illegitimate son from Cleonie, Frank Grouard, who by choice has been living as an Indian. The book ends with Flashman and his son travelling to Deadwood where Flashman meets another former acquaintance, Wild Bill Hickok prior to returning home.

== Characters ==
=== Fictional characters ===
- Harry Paget Flashman - The hero or anti-hero
- Elspeth - His loving and possibly unfaithful wife.
- Susie B. Willinck - A brothel owner and former prostitute. One of Flashman's "wives".
- Cleonie Grouard/Mrs. Arthur B. Candy - One of Susie Willinck's prostitutes.
- Sonsee-Array - Daughter of Apache chief Mangas Colorado and Flashman's "wife".
- Grattan Nugent-Hare - A member of Susie's wagon train, he absconds with two thousand dollars. Flashman later runs into him, discovering that he is one of Gallantin's scalp hunters, and that Susie had an affair with him. Flashman eventually gets into a fight with him over Sonsee-Array, which leads to Flashman accidentally killing him.

=== Historical characters ===
- Jim Bridger - Mountain man who confirms Flashman as suitable to be a wagon-captain
- Spotted Tail - A Brulé Lakota who Flashman initially meets in 1849, and then in 1875 at a wedding in Chicago. He may or may not have slept with Elspeth.
- John Joel Glanton - Scalphunter who Flashman falls in with. He describes Glanton (who he refers to as Gallantin) as "a burly fellow with feathers in his hat and two pistols belted over his frock-coat; when he turned I saw he had a forked beard and a great red birth-mark over half his face - a Sunday school-teacher, devil a doubt." Flashman is deceived into joining a scalp-hunt, an affair that results in his capture by the Apaches.
- Mangas Coloradas - Apache chief. Flashman is terrified by his physical appearance, and says, "He was a fine psychologist...an astute politician, and a bloody, cruel, treacherous barbarian who'd have been a disgrace to the Stone Age." Flashman eventually finds himself, due to circumstances beyond his control, forced to wed Colorado's daughter.
- Geronimo - Referred to in the novel as "the Yawner," Geronimo appears as one of Flashman's Apache captors and, later, friends. Though Flashman is open about his loathing for the Apache, he also refers to Geronimo as his "closest Indian friend." Flashman also refers to his relationship with Geronimo in the early 1900s, nearly half a century after their time together.
- Kit Carson - Carson makes a cameo in which he rescues a terrified Flashman from a group of pursuing Apache braves. Later, Flashman, while sitting with Carson, is mistaken for the legendary frontiersman by a drunken gold miner.
- Lucien Maxwell - Maxwell is briefly part of Carson and Flashman's travelling party.
- Philip Sheridan
- William Tecumseh Sherman
- John Pope
- George Crook
- Crazy Horse - Sioux leader who Flashman meets twice only briefly, first as a child in the company of Spotted Tail, and later during his captivity at Greasy Grass. Flashman describes him as "young and wiry, lean-faced and lank-haired and without paint - but with those eyes he didn't need any."
- Ulysses S. Grant - President of the United States during the present novel, but Flashman evidently knows him from before. He says, "Grant was the same burly, surly bargee I remembered, more like a city storekeeper than the first-rate soldier he'd been and the disillusioned President he was."
- William B. Allison - Flashman accompanies him to Fort Robinson and translates in his negotiations with the Sioux for the Black Hills. Flashman calls him "a Senator of unusual stupidity and flatulence". In an uncharacteristic show of sympathy for the Black Hills Sioux, Flashman suggests that had Allison been less sanctimonious, the entire war could have been avoided.
- Alfred Terry
- Red Cloud
- George Armstrong Custer - American soldier famous for his Last Stand at Greasy Grass. Flashman is acquainted with him from the American Civil War and clearly finds him annoying but also refers to him as a good cavalryman. Flashman refers to Custer as "a reckless firebrand who absolutely enjoyed warfare, and would have been better suited to the Age of Chivalry, when he'd have broken the Holy Grail in his hurry to get at it." When, at the Battle of the Little Bighorn, Flashman urges Custer to retreat, he is rebuffed—a decision that clearly resulted in the subsequent massacre of the 7th Cavalry at Last Stand Hill. During the battle, Flashman sees him die as he fires at a Sioux and likely misses - the implication being that Flashman shot him.
- Elizabeth Bacon Custer
- Thomas Custer
- Boston Custer
- Marcus Reno
- Frederick Benteen
- Myles Keogh
- James Calhoun
- Henry Armstrong Reed
- John Gibbon
- George Yates
- James Butler
- Chief Gall
- Wild Bill Hickok
- Richens Lacey Wootton
- Frank Grouard - In Flashman and the Redskins, Grouard is revealed to be Flashman's illegitimate son. MacDonald Fraser takes significant liberty in adapting Grouard's personal history so as to complete the novel's story. For example, Grouard is portrayed as having a Harvard education and having a friendly relationship with Spotted Tail.

== Reception ==
Kingsley Amis was a fan of the Flashman novels and always regarded this book as the best in the series. In The Boston Phoenix, reviewer Michael Gee noted that "The inevitability of the destruction of the Indian tribes is an unlikely topic for a comic novel. Fraser and his rascally 19th-century stand-in are to be commended for making the latest Flashman escapade as funny as it is. Just the same, this time history wins out. By the end of Flashman and the Redskins, the reader is likely to share the hero’s rather grim view of human nature. He’s also likely to share Flashman’s genial distaste for the romantic sweeping saga of the 19th century. And a good thing, too."
