= Tom Molineaux =

Bare-knuckle boxer (1784–1818)

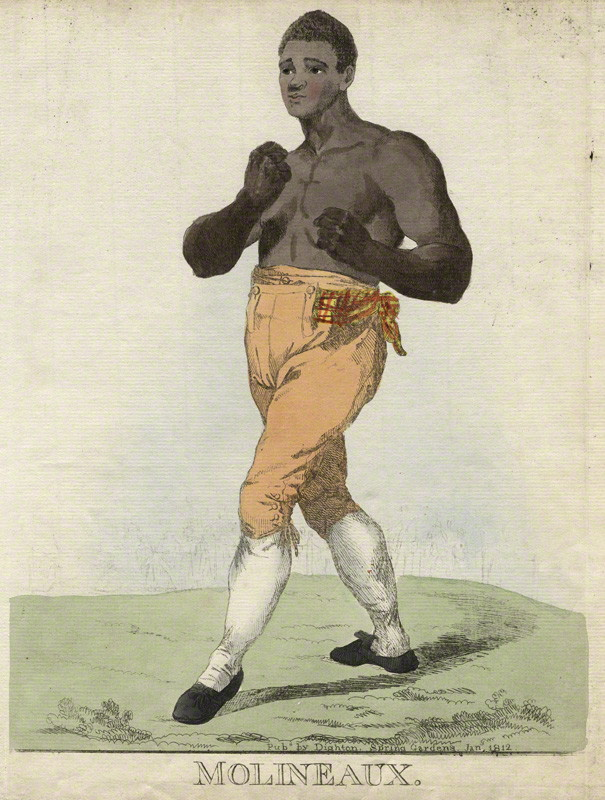
- Tom Molineaux by Robert Dighton.

Personal information
- Born: March 23, 1784 Virginia, United States
- Died: August 4, 1818 (aged 34) Galway, Ireland
- Height: 5 ft 8 in (173 cm)
- Weight: Heavyweight

Boxing career
- Stance: Orthodox

Boxing record
- Total fights: 10
- Wins: 5
- Losses: 3
- Draws: 1
- No contests: 1

Thomas Molineaux (March 23, 1784 – August 4, 1818), sometimes spelled Molyneaux or Molyneux, was an American bare-knuckle boxer and possibly a former slave. He spent much of his career in the United Kingdom of Great Britain and Ireland, where he had notable successes. He arrived in England in 1809 and started his fighting career there in 1810. His two fights against Tom Cribb, who was widely regarded as the Champion of England, in 1810 and 1811 brought Molineaux fame even though he lost both contests. The result of the first encounter was hotly contested, with accusations of a fix. The second match with Cribb, however, was an undisputed loss. His prizefighting career ended in 1815. After a tour that took him to Scotland and Ireland, he died in Galway, Ireland, in 1818 at age 34.

== Early life ==
According to some of the chroniclers of 19th-century boxing, Molineaux was born into slavery in the State of Virginia, USA in 1784. The most detailed account claims that he was born on a plantation and that he took his surname from the owners' name. An earlier writer just states that he came from the United States of America. In one account he boxed with other slaves to entertain plantation owners and was granted his freedom and $500 after winning a fight on which the son of the plantation owner had staked $100,000. Another source claims he was in the service of the one-time American ambassador to London, William Pinkney. One of his biographers points out that while some of these accounts may be based on truth, they cannot be substantiated and may have been romanticised to some extent. After obtaining his freedom, Molineaux was reported to have moved to New York, where he was said to have been involved in "several battles" and had claimed the title "Champion of America". He subsequently emigrated to England where he expected to be able to earn money as a prize fighter.

== Career in Europe ==
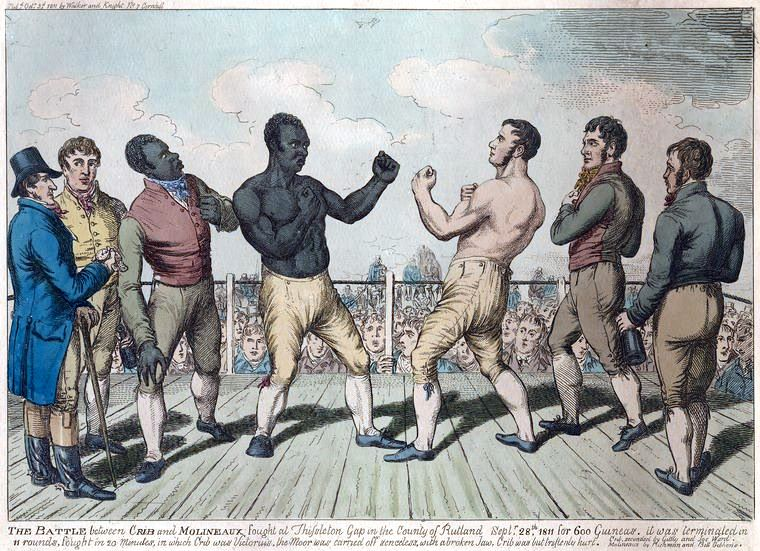
Molineaux (left) vs Tom Cribb.

Molineaux found his way to London in 1809 where he made contact with Bill Richmond, another ex-slave-turned-boxer who ran the pub the Horse and Dolphin in Leicester Square, London. Molineaux's first fight in England occurred at Tothill Fields, Westminster, on July 24, 1810. According to one report, the match was preceded by bull baiting. Molineaux won the fight, beating Jack Burrows of Bristol in front of a small crowd in 65 minutes. Bill Richmond seconded Molineaux for the fight and Tom Cribb seconded Burrows.

Molineaux's second fight in England was against Tom Blake, whose nickname was "Tom Tough". The fight took place at Epple Bay near Margate on August 21, 1810, the American ending up victorious after eight rounds when Molineaux knocked out Blake. In this fight, the American was reported to have shown "great improvement in the science of pugilism".

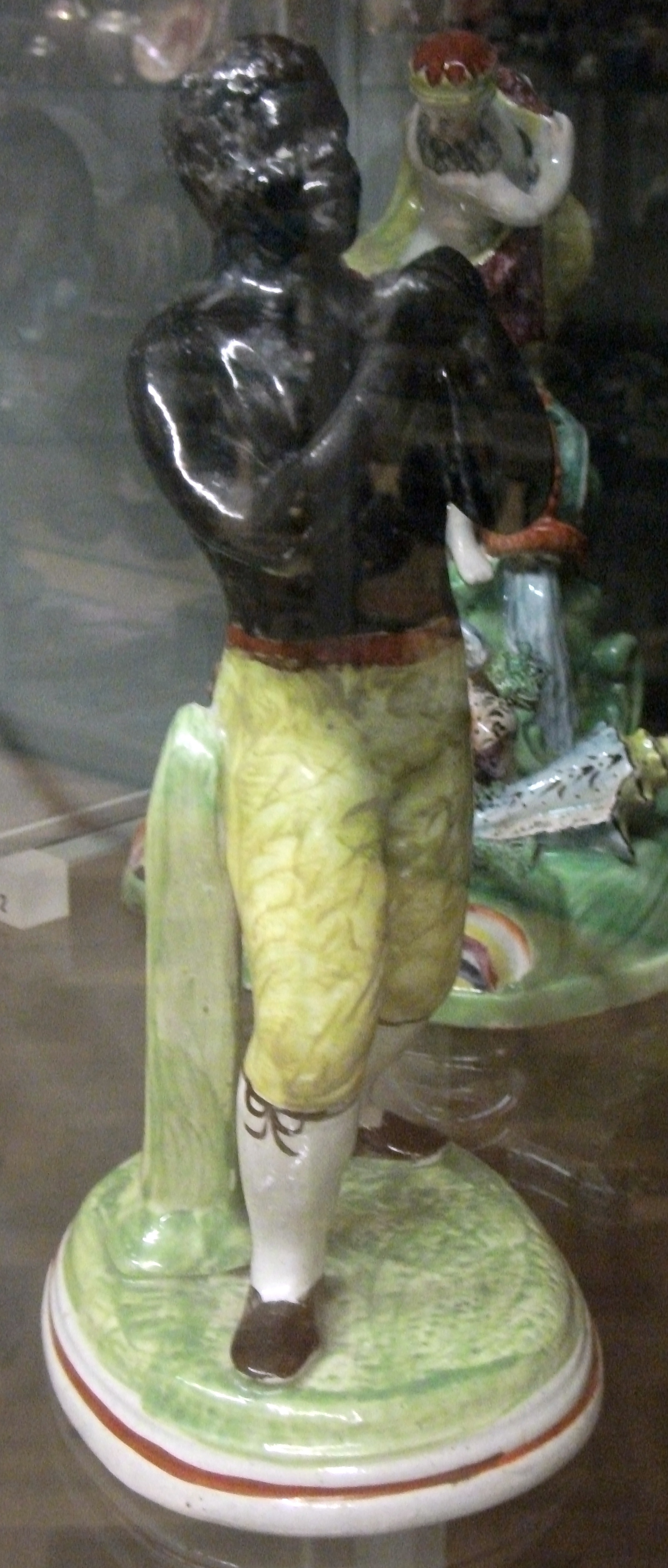
Staffordshire figure, c. 1815

On December 18, 1810, having been trained by Bill Richmond, Molineaux fought Tom Cribb at Shenington Hollow in Oxfordshire for the English title. According to the journalist and sportswriter Pierce Egan, who was present, Molineaux stood at five foot eight and a quarter inches tall and, for this fight, weighed "fourteen stone two" (198 pounds (90 kg)). Egan wrote that few people, including Cribb, expected the fight to last very long; there was betting that Cribb would win in the first ten rounds. Molineaux proved a powerful and intelligent fighter, and the two heavily battered each other. There was a disturbance in the 19th round as Molineaux and Cribb were locked in a wrestler's hold (legal under the rules of the time) so that neither could hit the other nor escape. The referee stood by, uncertain whether he should break the two apart, and the dissatisfied crowd pushed into the ring. In the confusion, Molineaux hurt his left hand; Egan could not tell if it had been broken. There was a dispute over whether Cribb had returned to the line before the allowed 30 seconds had passed. If he had not, Molineaux would have won, but the referee could not tell in the confusion and the fight went on. After the 34th round, Molineaux said he could not continue, but his second persuaded him to return to the ring, where he was defeated in the 35th round.

Two days after the fight, Richmond took Molineaux to the Stock Exchange in London, where the boxer received an ovation and was presented with 45 guineas.

On May 21, 1811, Molineaux took on William Rimmer, a 22-year-old fighter from Lancashire. The bout took place at Moulsey Hurst and Molineaux won after 21 rounds.

A return fight with Tom Cribb took place on September 28, 1811, at Thistleton Gap in Rutland and was watched by 15,000 people. Egan, who was present, said that both fighters "weighed less by more than a stone", which means Molineaux weighed at most 185 pounds (84 kg) for this fight. As preparation for the bout, Cribb had undertaken extensive training under the guidance of Captain Barclay. Molineaux, though still hitting Cribb with great power, was out-fought; Cribb broke his jaw and finally knocked him out in the 11th round. After the fight Richmond and Molineaux parted.

Molineaux fought four subsequent bouts, winning three and losing one. On April 2, 1813, Molineaux fought Jack Carter at Remington, Gloucestershire, the American winning after 25 rounds. After the fight, Molineaux went on tour, where he sparred in exhibition bouts. In 1813, he fought Abraham Denton at Derby, his opponent being described as a "country pugilist" with the stature of a giant. Molineaux won the contest. The tour took him to Scotland, and on May 27, 1814, he took on a boxer named William Fuller at Bishopstorff, Paisley, Ayrshire. After four rounds of fighting the match was interrupted when the "sheriff of Renfrewshire, attended by constables, entered the ring, and put a stop to it". A rematch was staged at Auchineux, 12 miles from Glasgow on May 31, 1814. 2 rounds were fought there, lasting 68 minutes, Molineaux being awarded the contest. On March 11, 1815, Molineaux fought and lost to George Cooper at Corset Hill, Lanarkshire.

Molineaux also entered Cornish wrestling tournaments in England when touring in the early 1800s.

== Post-boxing life ==
Molineaux's prizefighting career ended in 1815. However, he continued to show his talents in sparring exhibitions. After visiting Scotland, he toured Ireland, where in 1817, he was reportedly in the northern part of the island. He suffered from tuberculosis. After a stint in a debtors' prison he became increasingly dependent on alcohol.

He died penniless in the bandroom of the 77th Regiment in Galway, Ireland, on 4 August 1818. He was 34 years old.

In 2018, Galway City Museum held an exhibition on the life of Molineaux to mark the 200th anniversary of his death. Also in 2018 a plaque was erected in Galway at the site of his death.

In 2019, Katie Taylor unveiled a headstone over his previously unmarked grave in St James' graveyard in Galway.

== Career record ==
5 wins, 3 losses, 1 draw
Result	Opponent	Date	Location	Duration
Win	Jack Burrows	July 24, 1810	Tothill Fields, Westminster	65 minutes
Win	Tom Blake	August 21, 1810	Epple Bay near Margate	8 rounds
Loss	Tom Cribb	December 18, 1810	Copthorne Gap, Surrey	35 rounds
Win	William Rimmer	May 21, 1811	Moulsey Hurst	21 rounds
Loss	Tom Cribb	September 28, 1811	Thistleton Gap	11 rounds
Win	Jack Carter	April 2, 1813	Remington, Gloucestershire	25 rounds
Draw	William Fuller	May 27, 1814	Bishopstorff, Paisley	4 rounds
Win	William Fuller	May 31, 1814	Auchineux	2 rounds
Loss	George Cooper	March 11, 1815	Corset Hill, Lanarkshire	14 rounds

== Legacy ==
- Molineaux is a direct ancestor of American hip-hop artist LL Cool J. The rapper, named James Todd Smith, found out the information when he had his genealogy traced on a television show titled Finding Your Roots.
- A hand-coloured etching of Molineaux by Robert Dighton is held in the National Portrait Gallery in London.
- A fictionalized account of Molineaux's boxing career is the basis of Black Ajax by George MacDonald Fraser.
- In 2003, Molineaux was featured in the television documentary Georgian Underworld: Bare Knuckle Boxer.
- Thomas Molineaux is featured in the short animation The Prize Fighter, directed by Jason Young.
- Tom Molyneaux is featured as a ghost in the short story Apparition in the Prize Ring by Robert E. Howard, who was a boxing fan.
- Molineaux's fight with Cribb was turned into a 2014 play called Prize Fighters (based on the book Bristol Boys by Jack Allen) by director Ed Viney and was performed in the Tobacco Factory in 2015.
- Molineaux's return fight with Cribb in 1811 at Thistleton Gap is referred to in Regency Buck, a novel by Georgette Heyer.
- Molineaux was inducted into the International Boxing Hall of Fame in 1997.
- In 2010, Molineaux was inducted into the Bare Knuckle Boxing Hall of Fame.
- In 2017, a documentary film Ag Trasnú an Atlantaigh Dhuibh (Crossing the Black Atlantic), directed by Des Kilbane and Andrew Gallimore, premiered at the Galway Film Fleadh.

== See also ==
- Boxing
