= Flashman (novel) =

1969 novel by George MacDonald Fraser

- First edition cover
- Author: George MacDonald Fraser
- Cover artist: Arthur Barbosa
- Language: English
- Genre: Historical novel
- Publisher: Barrie & Jenkins
- Publication date: 1969
- Publication place: United Kingdom
- Media type: Print (hardback and paperback)
- Pages: 256
- ISBN: 0-257-66799-7
- OCLC: 29733
- Dewey Decimal: 823/.9/14
- LC Class: PZ4.F8418 Fp PR6056.R287
- Preceded by: -
- Followed by: Royal Flash

Flashman is a 1969 novel by George MacDonald Fraser. It is the first of the Flashman novels.

== Plot introduction ==
Presented within the frame of the discovery of the supposedly historical Flashman Papers, this book chronicles the subsequent career of the bully Flashman from Tom Brown's School Days. The book begins with a fictional note explaining that the Flashman Papers were discovered in 1965 during a sale of household furniture in Ashby, Leicestershire.

The papers are attributed to Harry Paget Flashman, the bully featured in Thomas Hughes's novel, who becomes a well-known Victorian military hero (in Fraser's fictional England). The papers were supposedly written between 1900 and 1905. The subsequent publishing of these papers, of which Flashman is the first installment, contrasts the public image of a (fictional) hero with his own more scandalous account of his life as an amoral and cowardly bully.

Flashman begins with the eponymous hero's own account of his expulsion from Rugby and ends with his fame as "the Hector of Afghanistan". It details his life from 1839 to 1842 and his travels to Scotland, India, and Afghanistan.

It also contains a number of notes by the author, in the guise of a mere editor of the papers, providing additional historical glosses on the events described. The history in these books is largely accurate; most of the prominent figures Flashman meets were real people.

== Plot summary ==
Flashman's expulsion from Rugby for drunkenness leads him to join the British Army in what he hopes will be a sinecure. He joins the 11th Regiment of Light Dragoons commanded by Lord Cardigan, to whom he toadies in his best style. After an affair with a fellow-officer's lover, he is challenged to a duel but wins after promising a large sum of money to the pistol loader to give his opponent a blank load in his gun. He does not kill his opponent but instead delopes and accidentally shoots the top off a bottle thirty yards away, an action that gives him instant fame and the respect of the Duke of Wellington.

Once the reason for fighting emerges, the army stations Flashman in Scotland. He is quartered with the family of textile industrialist Morrison and soon enough takes advantage of one of the daughters, Elspeth. After a forced marriage, Flashman is required to resign the Hussars due to marrying below his station. He is given another option, to make his reputation in India.

By showing off his language and riding skills in India, Flashman is assigned to the staff of Major General William George Keith Elphinstone, who is to command the garrison at the worst frontier of the British Empire at that time, Afghanistan. Upon arrival, he is instructed to undertake various diplomatic missions and thereby increases his knowledge of the contemporary Afghan political situation, local culture and language. During one early diplomatic mission, Flashman makes an enemy of the terrifying Gul Shah and, characteristically, takes false credit for slaying assassins sent by Gul to kill him: in reality he attempted to flee in fear while his companion bravely fought and died to protect him from the assassins.

Meanwhile in Kabul, senior British commanders and diplomats appear unaware or unwilling to accept that the situation in the country is worsening. For his part, Flashman accurately observes the deteriorating situation during his various assignments in the country: his reports are generally ignored.

He is back in Kabul to observe a mob storming the house of Sir Alexander Burnes, one of the senior British political officers. Burnes, his brother and his staff are slain in the street while the ill-led British army does nothing, remaining in their encampment outside of Kabul. Flashman again attempts to flee in midst of the confusion but is captured and tortured by Gul Shah, only to be rescued and then subsequently used as a diplomatic envoy by the duplicitous Afghan leader Akbar Khan.

This tale sets the tone for Flashman's proceeding adventures, including the disastrous 1842 retreat from Kabul and the Battle of Jellalabad, in the First Anglo-Afghan War. Despite being captured, tortured and escaping death numerous times, hiding and shirking his duty as much as possible, he comes through it with a hero's reputation; although his triumph is tempered when he realises his wife might have been unfaithful while he was away.

== Characters ==
=== Fictional characters ===
- Harry Paget Flashman - The hero or anti-hero,
- Elspeth Morrison - His adoring and possibly unfaithful wife,
- Henry Buckley Flashman - His father,
- John Morrison - His father-in-law,
- Judy - His father's mistress and (briefly) Flashman's lover,
- Bernier - The man he insults and duels with,
- Josette - Bernier's lover, with whom Flashman has an affair,
- Fetnab - Flashman's language and sexual tutor in India,
- Sher Afzul - A Ghilzai Khan to whom Flashman is sent as an emissary,
- Narreeman - An Afghan dancer whom Flashman rapes,
- Gul Shah - Sher Afzul's nephew, Narreeman's lover and later husband, and Flashman's torturer,
- Hudson - Flashman's sergeant on the retreat from Kabul who comes to realise Flashman is a coward but dies before he can expose him.

=== Historical characters ===
- Thomas Hughes - The author of Tom Brown's Schooldays.
- Thomas Arnold - The headmaster of Rugby School.
- Lord Cardigan - Flashman's original commanding officer, whom he describes as "amusing, frightening, vindictive, charming, and downright dangerous" and "too stupid ever to be afraid".
- Captain John Reynolds - embroiled in "The Black Bottle Affair" with Lord Cardigan.
- Lord Auckland - Governor-General of India.
- Sir Robert Henry Sale - Commander at the Battle of Jellalabad.
- Lady Sale - Sir Robert's wife, and celebrated diarist.
- Paolo Di Avitabile - Governor of Peshawar, Flashman said of him "the Sikhs and Afghans were more scared of him than the devil himself".
- Willoughby Cotton - Former army commander at Kabul.
- Alexander Burnes - Political agent at Kabul, Flashman is present at his assassination.
- General John Nicholson.
- Colin Mackenzie - army officer who is depicted as one of the few competent British officers in Afghanistan.
- George Broadfoot - reckoned to be one of the bravest officers amongst the British in Kabul.
- William Hay Macnaghten - Head political agent at Kabul, Flashman is present at his assassination.
- General Elphinstone - Commander of the Kabul army, whom Flashman describes as "the greatest military idiot of our own or any other day".
- Akbar Khan - Led the revolt in Kabul and held Flashman hostage; Flashman "was impressed by the obvious latent strength of the man" but also says "he was something of a dandy".
- William Nott (1782 – 1845), a British military leader in India.
- Henry Havelock - army officer who meets Flashman at the Siege of Jalalabad.
- Edward Law, 1st Earl of Ellenborough- Governor-General of India, whom Flashman found to be rather long-winded.
- Duke of Wellington - goes with Flashman to visit the Queen and shakes his hand.
- Queen Victoria - Flashman describes her as "rather plump, and pretty enough beneath the neck".
- Prince Albert - who has "hellish-looking whiskers" according to Flashman.
- Thomas Babington Macaulay - present when Flashman meets the Queen.

== Background ==
George MacDonald Fraser was a journalist who dreamt of becoming a novelist. He wrote a straight historical novel in the mid-1950s which no one would publish (this was published posthumously as Captain in Calico) and came to feel that he would achieve success only if he did something in a more comical vein. In 1966 he came up with the idea of basing a novel around Harry Flashman from Tom Brown's School Days - "I thought he was a good character gone to waste. He only appears for a few minutes in the book."

Fraser later said he was inspired to put pen to paper by two events: going on a recent trip to Borneo and Malaya during the Indonesian Confrontation which re-ignited his interest in Asia and soldiering, and having just completed a stint as acting editor of his paper, which re-enforced his determination to get out of journalism. He told his wife "I'll write us out of this".

When Fraser was deputy editor at the Glasgow Herald he typically finished his day at midnight. "When you do that you read til three or four in the morning anyway," he recalled. "I wrote instead, and did research."

Fraser wrote the book after work in nightly bursts, taking ninety hours all up with no advance plotting or revisions. Half way through he broke his arm and could not type; he might have given up but his wife read it, was enthusiastic, and encouraged him to continue. He took two years to find a publisher, before it was taken up by Herbert Jenkins.

== Reception ==
When the book was published in America, several reviewers thought it was a true story. "The trouble was, these weren't idiots," Fraser said. "They were university professors and people."

Reviews were generally positive and the book sold well. "It just went whoof," said Fraser.

By 1970 the book had sold out two hard back runs of 10,000 each and over 200,000 copies in paperback. This success – notably the sale of the film rights – enabled Fraser to leave journalism and become a full-time writer. It also compelled him to move to the Isle of Man to avoid income tax.

== Proposed film version ==
Film rights were sold to Bob Booker and George Foster's Cinema Organization company, and initial plans called for a movie to be directed by Richard Lester. In August 1969 it was announced the script would be written by Charles Wood with filming to start early the following year.

Lester admired the book greatly, saying "it was an extraordinary period of British history and it was a marvellously interesting premise... There were lots of things in it that made sense to me—about soldiering, about the military, about the economics of military politics. And I also had various notions about the Victorian ethic and the Protestant, John Foster Dulles ethic and the relationship of one to the other."

Lester obtained funds from United Artists and John Alderton was cast as Flashman. Frank Muir, who worked on the script, said that because Alderton was not known in the United States he had to do a screen test but United Artists approved him. In February 1970 it was reported Joan Collins was in talks with Lester to play a role.

Lester was scouting locations in Spain to stand in for Afghanistan and was about to start casting when there was a change of management at United Artists and the film was cancelled. Muir later wrote "I think the unfortunate loser was John Alderton. If ever it was a case of the right actor finding the right part and then losing it through no fault of his own it was John."

The British film industry was in crisis at the time due to the withdrawal of American finance. By March 1970 the project was cancelled. It has been suggested United Artists may have been made reluctant in part by the failure of another historical adventure film, The Adventures of Gerard based on the stories of Arthur Conan Doyle that had inspired Fraser to write Flashman.

Lester said it "came about at the time when the film industry began to collapse within itself. A sort of implosion. It’s a very expensive project, a period film where at one point 13,000 of the British Army have to retreat in January from Kabul into India, being attacked by hordes of Afghans. It’s not the sort of thing that you can do on a shoestring... To do it properly it would be a very expensive film; and I don’t think one should do it improperly. "

Lester later said, "it came in that very bad year for United Artists when they wrote off 90 million and cancelled nearly everything." After the failure of The Bed Sitting Room Lester did not make a film for five years.

In August 1971 Stanley Baker was attached as producer with Lester still to direct. However, the film was not made.

Lester admired Fraser's writing and later hired the author to write the screenplay for The Three Musketeers (1973). This launched Fraser's scriptwriting career and he and Lester collaborated on the one film (to date) made from a Flashman novel, Royal Flash (1975). Diabolique magazine argued that Flashman would have been a better introduction to the character.

In 2015, Variety reported that 20th Century Fox was developing a movie adaptation of the Flashman novels, with Ridley Scott and Peter Chernin producing.
