= Flashman on the March =

2005 novel by George MacDonald Fraser

- First edition cover
- Author: George MacDonald Fraser
- Language: English
- Genre: Historical novel
- Publisher: HarperCollins
- Publication date: 2005
- Publication place: United Kingdom
- Media type: Print (hardback & paperback)
- Pages: 320 pp (paperback)
- ISBN: 0-00-719740-3
- OCLC: 62264997
- Preceded by: Flashman and the Tiger

Flashman on the March is a 2005 novel by George MacDonald Fraser. It is the twelfth and last Flashman novel.

== Plot introduction ==
As in all of Fraser's Flashman novels, the story is presented as part of the Flashman Papers, supposedly written by Sir Harry Flashman, the villain of Tom Brown's School Days. It begins with the usual explanatory note detailing the discovery of the papers.

The adventure is set in 1867-8 and starts in Trieste, shortly after Flashman's service with Emperor Maximilian I in Mexico. Flashman then travels to Abyssinia (Ethiopia) and takes part in General Robert Napier's 1868 expedition.

== Plot summary ==
Having fled Mexico aboard the Austrian warship carrying the Emperor Maximilian's body home for burial, Flashman is on the run, after mortally offending Admiral Tegethoff by seducing his great-niece en voyage. Flashman meets an old acquaintance, Jack Speedicut (who appears in other Flashman novels), who enlists him to escort a shipment of Maria Theresa thalers to General Robert Napier's forces in Abyssinia, via Suez.

General Napier, overjoyed to find the noted military hero Flashman arrived in Abyssinia, immediately despatches him on a secret undercover mission to recruit Queen Masteeat and her Galla people, who are opposed to Emperor Theodore II of Ethiopia, travelling in the company of her half-sister Uliba-Wark, who is herself scheming to depose Queen Masteeat. Flashman succeeds in enlisting the assistance of Queen Masteeat, but is then captured by Emperor Theodore's forces.

The second half of the novel deals with Flashman's relations with the Emperor and covers the final battle with Napier's forces and their allies, after which Theodore commits suicide. Flashman tells Napier at the conclusion that the British government could have avoided the whole sorry adventure if they had simply given Theodore the respect that a monarch deserves by properly responding to his letters.

== Characters ==
=== Fictional characters ===
- Harry Paget Flashman - The hero or anti-hero.
- Jack Speedicut - An old school friend of Harry's, who also appears as a supporting character in Tom Brown's Schooldays.
- Uliba-Wark - The half-sister of Queen Masteeat. Although initially an ally and lover to Flashman, she vows revenge on him after he throws her over a waterfall. Upon arriving in Galla territory she attempts to kill Flashman and stage a coup, but is inadvertently foiled when Emperor Theodore attacks her band of conspirators, killing her.
- Yando - An Abyssinian chief who tries to force Uliba-Wark to marry him and tortures Flashman. He is executed on Uliba-Wark's orders after being captured.
- Malee - Uliba-Wark's servant girl who seduces Flashman and later betrays the two to Yando.
- Miriam - The leader of Emperor Theodore's Amazons. Accidentally killed by one of Theodore's mortars during the Battle of Magdala.
- Gertrude Tegetthoff - Wilhelm von Tegetthoff's niece, who loses her virginity to Flashman.

=== Historical characters ===
- Wilhelm von Tegetthoff - Austrian admiral.
- Robert Napier, 1st Baron Napier of Magdala
- Captain Speedy - Victorian soldier and explorer.
- Emperor Theodore II of Ethiopia
- Queen Masteeat
- G. A. Henty - Writer
- Henry Morton Stanley explorer and journalist
