= The Steel Bonnets =

1971 book by George MacDonald Fraser

The Steel Bonnets: The Story of the Anglo Scottish Border Reivers
- Author: George MacDonald Fraser
- Language: English
- Genre: history
- Publisher: Barrie & Jenkins.
- Publication date: 1971
- Publication place: United Kingdom

The Steel Bonnets: The Story of the Anglo Scottish Border Reivers (London: Barrie & Jenkins) is a 1971 historical non-fiction book by George MacDonald Fraser about the Border Reivers.

Fraser researched the book with his wife. It concentrates mainly on the 16th century, and seeks to de-glamourise the period in some ways.

The Daily Telegraph called it "a vigorous and valuable book."
