= The Reavers =

- First edition
- Author: George MacDonald Fraser
- Language: English
- Publisher: HarperCollins
- Publication date: 2007
- Publication place: United Kingdom

The Reavers is a 2007 comic novel from George MacDonald Fraser set during the Elizabethan Era.

It was the last novel Fraser published in his lifetime. "This book is nonsense," said Fraser. "It is meant to be... wildly over the top, written for the fun of it."
