= Quartered Safe Out Here =

1993 memoir by George MacDonald Fraser

- Author: George MacDonald Fraser
- Language: English
- Genre: memoir
- Publisher: Harvill
- Publication date: 1993
- Publication place: United Kingdom

Quartered Safe Out Here: A Recollection of the War in Burma is a military memoir of World War II by George MacDonald Fraser, the author of The Flashman Papers series of novels. Quartered Safe Out Here was first published in 1993.

It describes in graphic and memorable detail Fraser's experiences as a 19-year-old private in 9th Battalion, The Border Regiment, fighting with the British 14th Army against the Imperial Japanese Army, during the latter stages of the Burma Campaign in late 1944 and 1945. This included his participation in the Battle of Meiktila and Mandalay and the Battle of Pokoku and Irrawaddy River operations.

The military historian Sir John Keegan wrote: "There is no doubt that it is one of the great personal memoirs of the Second World War." Keegan gives similar praise to Norman Lewis's Naples '44 memoir, later produced as a feature film. Fraser's book has also been praised by the English author Melvyn Bragg and the American playwright David Mamet.

The book's title is a quotation from Rudyard Kipling's 1890 poem "Gunga Din", and is ironic since Fraser certainly was not "quartered safe out here", while serving in Burma during one of the final campaigns of the war.

The book includes several criticisms of the state of Britain today. Fraser called it "an extremely politically incorrect book."

== Adaptation ==
The book was adapted into an audio drama by Robin Brooks, with Nicholas Nunn as Fraser. It was broadcast on BBC Radio 4 in July 2025.
