= Caro Fraser =

British writer (1953–2020)

Caroline Georgiana ("Caro") Fraser (1953 - 12 April 2020) was a British novelist, and the daughter of writer George MacDonald Fraser, author of The Flashman Papers books.

Fraser was born in Carlisle in 1953, but her family moved to Glasgow shortly afterwards and she was brought up there until her mid-teens, attending Glasgow High School for Girls. When she was 15 her father published the first book in the Flashman series, and the family subsequently moved to the Isle of Man, where she went to The Buchan School. She started writing professionally in 1992, but before that she was a commercial and maritime lawyer, and before that an advertising copywriter.

She had four children and died of cancer 20 April 2020.

== Publications ==
=== Caper Court series ===
- The Pupil (1992)
- Judicial Whispers (1995)
- An Immoral Code (1997)
- A Hallowed Place (1999)
- A Perfect Obsession (2002)
- A Calculating Heart (2004)
- Breath of Corruption (2007)
- Errors of Judgment (2013)
- A Touch of Silk (2020)

=== The Haddon Chronicles ===
- The Summer House Party (2017) ISBN 978-1786691484
- Summer of Love (2018) ISBN 978-1788541381

=== Other novels ===
She also wrote six stand-alone novels, which she described on her web site as romantic fiction for the thinking woman.

- The Trustees (1994)
- An Inheritance (1996)
- Beyond Forgiveness (1998)
- A Little Learning (2001)
- Familiar Rooms in Darkness (2003)
- A World Apart (2006)
