= Captain in Calico =

2015 novel by George MacDonald Fraser

- First edition
- Author: George MacDonald Fraser
- Language: English
- Publisher: HarperCollins
- Publication date: 2015
- Publication place: United Kingdom

Captain in Calico is a 2015 novel by George MacDonald Fraser. It was published seven years after his death in 2008 and is about the pirate John Rackham. Mary Read and Anne Bonny also appear as characters in this novel.

== Plot ==
John Rackham asks the governor of the Bahamas, Woodes Rogers, for a royal pardon. Rogers agrees for his own reasons.

== Background ==
The novel was written in 1959 and was heavily influenced by authors Fraser long admired, such as Rafael Sabatini, PC Wren, GA Henty and Sir Walter Scott, along with pirate films like Captain Blood.

The manuscript was found by Fraser’s three children when they cleared out their parents’ home following the death of their mother. According to Fraser's daughter Caro:

In the last room, right in the corner, in what had been my father’s old study, was a fireproof safe which we had forgotten about. It took us a while to get the combination. And in there was this manuscript which he'd clearly put away hoping, I think, it would be found. If he had plans for another Flashman novel, he didn't leave any trace behind, because I don't think he wanted anyone to use material that he had half-prepared. But this was on its own, and in the safe.

They were eventually persuaded to publish by HarperCollins, Fraser's publisher.

The publication has come about because we had to sell all those books in my father’s library, and we went through my father’s favourite bookshop, Heywood Hill, in Mayfair, who wanted something original like a pamphlet he had written, to help publicise the sale. So we thought, what about the first chapter of this book he'd written. Would that do? And Heywood Hill said, ‘Are you crazy? You've got an unpublished novel by George MacDonald Fraser?’ And the ball just kept rolling from there.

Captain in Calico would probably be even less likely to find a publisher today than 60 years ago, and we do not want readers to be deceived into thinking it is vintage George MacDonald Fraser, and of the standard of the Flashman novels, or the McAuslan short stories. Indeed, we thought long and hard before allowing it to be published, and are only doing so because we believe that, as an early work, Captain in Calico is a delightful curiosity, one which we hope will provide fans of GMF with a fascinating insight into the inspirations and creative impulses that turned him into such a fine novelist.
