= Royal Flash =

1970 novel by George MacDonald Fraser

- First edition cover
- Author: George MacDonald Fraser
- Cover artist: Arthur Barbosa
- Language: English
- Genre: Historical novel
- Publisher: Barrie & Jenkins
- Publication date: 1970
- Publication place: United Kingdom
- Media type: Print (Hardback & Paperback)
- Pages: 256
- ISBN: 978-0-257-65101-9
- OCLC: 29733
- Dewey Decimal: 823/.9/14
- LC Class: PZ4.F8418 Fp PR6056.R287
- Preceded by: Flashman
- Followed by: Flash for Freedom!

Royal Flash is a 1970 novel by George MacDonald Fraser. It is the second of the Flashman novels. It was made into the film Royal Flash in 1975 and remains the only Flashman novel to be filmed.

== Plot summary ==
Royal Flash is set during the Revolutions of 1848. The story features Lola Montez and Otto von Bismarck as major characters, and fictionalises elements of the Schleswig-Holstein Question, 1843, 1847 and 1848. It is set in the fictional Duchy of Strackenz, making it the only Flashman novel to be set in a fictitious location.

Other characters include:

- Prince Edward
- Lola Montez
- Ludwig I of Bavaria
- John Gully
- Nicholas Ward
- Lord Conyngham
- Richard Wagner
- Franz Liszt
- Oscar Wilde
- Henry Irving
- Karl Marx
- Lord Palmerston
- Viscount Peel
- Jefferson Davis

The book is loosely based on the plot of The Prisoner of Zenda. Flashman explains that this is because the story was plagiarised from him by its author, Anthony Hope. In a letter, Fraser wrote that during his researches into an earlier Flashman book he had discovered that in real life Bismarck and Lola Montez had been in London at the same time. He added that it had been too good an opportunity to miss.

The book's plot is anachronistic in depicting Bismarck already in 1848 striving for the unification of Germany. In fact, during the revolutions of 1848 Bismarck was completely opposed to German Unification, which in 1848 was a cause promoted by radical revolutionaries that the conservative Bismarck detested. Unlike his depiction in the book, Bismarck only took up German Unification much later in his career, when he could use it to enhance the power of the Prussian Monarchy and his own.
