= George MacDonald Fraser =

British author (1925–2008)

George MacDonald Fraser OBE FRSL
- Born: 2 April 1925; Carlisle, Cumberland, England
- Died: 2 January 2008 (aged 82); Douglas, Isle of Man
- Occupation: Author
- Known for: The Flashman Papers series of novels; McAuslan short stories; screenplay for Octopussy
- Spouse: Kathleen Hetherington (m. 1949)
- Children: 3, including Caro Fraser

George MacDonald Fraser OBE FRSL (2 April 1925 – 2 January 2008) was a British author and screenwriter. He is best known for a series of works that featured the character Flashman. Over the course of his career he wrote eleven novels and one short-story collection in the Flashman series of novels, as well as non-fiction, short stories, novels and screenplays—including those for the James Bond film Octopussy, The Three Musketeers (along with both its sequels) and an adaptation of his own novel Royal Flash.

== Biography ==
Fraser was born in Carlisle, England, on 2 April 1925, son of medical doctor William Fraser and nurse Annie Struth, née Donaldson. Both his parents were Scottish. It was his father who passed on to Fraser his love of reading, and a passion for his Scottish heritage.

Fraser was educated at Carlisle Grammar School and Glasgow Academy; he later described himself as a poor student due to "sheer laziness". This meant that he was unable to follow his father's wishes and study medicine.

=== War service ===
In 1943, during World War II, Fraser enlisted in the Border Regiment and served in the Burma campaign, as recounted in his memoir Quartered Safe Out Here (1993). After completing his Officer Cadet Training Unit (OCTU) course, Fraser was granted a commission into the Gordon Highlanders. He served with them in the Middle East and North Africa immediately after the war, notably in Tripoli. In 1947, Fraser decided against remaining with the army and took up his demobilisation. He wrote semi-autobiographical stories and anecdotes of his time with the Gordon Highlanders in the "McAuslan" series.

=== Journalism ===
After his discharge, Fraser returned to the United Kingdom. Through his father he got a job as a trainee reporter on the Carlisle Journal and married another journalist, Kathleen Hetherington. They travelled to Canada, working on newspapers there, before returning to Scotland. Starting in 1953, Fraser worked for many years as a journalist at the Glasgow Herald newspaper, where he was deputy editor from 1964 until 1969. He briefly held the title of acting editor.

=== Novelist and screenwriter ===
In 1966, Fraser got the idea to turn Flashman, a fictional coward and bully originally created by Thomas Hughes in Tom Brown's School Days (1857), into a "hero", and he wrote a novel around the character's exploits. The book proved popular and sale of the film rights enabled Fraser to become a full-time writer. He moved to the Isle of Man where he could pay less tax. He also says he found the island "simpler a nicer place to live... more like the Britain I knew and loved as a child."

There was a series of further Flashman novels, presented as packets of memoirs written by the nonagenarian Flashman looking back on his days as a hero of the British Army during the 19th century. The series is notable for the accuracy of its historical settings and praise it received from critics. For example, P. G. Wodehouse said of Flashman, "If ever there was a time when I felt that 'watcher-of-the-skies-when-a-new-planet' stuff, it was when I read the first Flashman."

The first Flashman sequel was Royal Flash. It was published in 1970, the same year that Fraser published The General Danced at Dawn, a series of short stories which fictionalised his post-war military experience as the adventures of "Dand" MacNeill in a Scottish Highland regiment. The following year Fraser published a third Flashman, Flash for Freedom!, as well as a non-fiction work, The Steel Bonnets (1971), a history of the Border Reivers of the Anglo-Scottish Border.

The film rights to Flashman were bought by Richard Lester, who was unable to get the film funded but hired Fraser to write the screenplay for The Three Musketeers in Christmas 1972. This would be turned into two films, The Three Musketeers and The Four Musketeers, both popular at the box office, and it launched Fraser as a screenwriter.

Following Flashman at the Charge (1973), Fraser wrote the screenplay for the movie Royal Flash (1975), also directed by Richard Lester. It was not a success at the box office.

There was another collection of Dand McNeill stories, McAuslan in the Rough (1974), then Flashman in the Great Game (1975) and Flashman's Lady (1977). He was hired to rewrite The Prince and the Pauper (1977) and Force 10 from Navarone (1978). The latter was directed by Guy Hamilton who arranged for Fraser to do some work on the script for Superman (1978). He did some uncredited work on the film Ashanti and wrote an unused script for Tai Pan to star Steve McQueen. He also wrote a biopic of General Stilwell for Martin Ritt which was not filmed.

Fraser tried a more serious historical novel with Mr American (1980), although Flashman still appeared in it. Flashman and the Redskins (1982) was a traditional Flashman and The Pyrates (1983) was a comic novel about pirates. He was one of several writers who worked on the James Bond film Octopussy (1983). Richard Fleischer arranged for him to do work on the script for Red Sonja (1985).

After Flashman and the Dragon (1985) he was reunited with Lester on The Return of the Musketeers (1988) then released a final volume of McAuslan stories, The Sheikh and the Dustbin (1988) and did another history, The Hollywood History of the World (1988). When that film book came out he was reportedly working on a science fiction film Colossus and adapting Conan Doyle's The Lost World for TV but neither project was filmed.

Following Flashman and the Mountain of Light (1990), Fraser wrote a version of The Lone Ranger for John Landis which ended up not being filmed. He did his memoirs of his experiences during World War II, Quartered Safe Out Here (1992).

He wrote a short novel about the Border Reivers of the 16th century, The Candlemass Road (1993), then Flashman and the Angel of the Lord (1994) and Black Ajax (1997), a novel about Tom Molineaux, which featured Flashman's father as a support character.

Flashman and the Tiger (1999) consisted of three different Flashman stories. The Light's on at Signpost (2002) was a second volume of memoirs, focusing on Fraser's adventures in Hollywood and his criticisms of modern-day Britain. The latter could also be found in Flashman on the March (2005), the final Flashman, and The Reavers (2007), a comic novel about the Border Reivers in the style of The Pyrates.

Following his death a novel was discovered amongst his papers, Captain in Calico. This was published in 2015.

== Honours ==
Fraser was appointed Officer of the Order of the British Empire (OBE) in the 1999 Birthday Honours for services to literature. A traditionalist, he was an Honorary Member of the British Weights and Measures Association, which opposes compulsory conversion to the metric system.

== Family ==
Fraser married Kathleen Hetherington in 1949. They had three children, Simon, Caroline and Nicholas; he had eight grandchildren. He was a supporter of Glasgow football team Partick Thistle.

Fraser died in Douglas on 2 January 2008 from cancer, aged 82. The eulogy at his funeral was spoken by Terry Cringle of Manx Radio.

== Publications ==
=== Flashman novels ===
The Flashman series constitute Fraser's major works. There are 12 books in the series:

1. Flashman (1969)
2. Royal Flash (1970)
3. Flash for Freedom! (1971)
4. Flashman at the Charge (1973)
5. Flashman in the Great Game (1975)
6. Flashman's Lady (1977)
7. Flashman and the Redskins (1982)
8. Flashman and the Dragon (1985)
9. Flashman and the Mountain of Light (1990)
10. Flashman and the Angel of the Lord (1994)
11. Flashman and the Tiger (1999)
12. Flashman on the March (2005)

=== Short stories ===
The "Dand MacNeill" or "McAuslan" stories is a series of semi-autobiographical short stories based on the author's experiences in the Gordon Highlanders, in North Africa and Scotland, soon after World War II. Some of the stories were originally bylined "by Dand MacNeill", a play on the regimental motto BYDAND, meaning standfast:

- The General Danced at Dawn (1970)
- McAuslan in the Rough (1974)
- The Sheikh and the Dustbin (1988)
- The Complete McAuslan (2000) (All the stories in the three volumes, with a new introduction.)

=== History ===
- The Steel Bonnets (1971), a history of the Border Reivers of the Anglo-Scottish Border.
- The Hollywood History of the World: From One Million Years B.C. to Apocalypse Now (1988, revised 1996) The book discusses how Hollywood deals with history. It concludes that the standard of historical analysis in most movies is far better than one might imagine. The text is illustrated by comparative images of figures from history and the actors who portrayed them in film.

=== Memoirs ===
- Quartered Safe Out Here (1992), a memoir of his experiences as an infantryman in the Border Regiment during the Burma campaign of World War II
- The Light's on at Signpost (2002), a memoir of the author's days writing in Hollywood, interspersed with criticism of political correctness and New Labour.

=== Other novels ===
- Mr American (1980), a novel about a mysterious American in England.
- The Pyrates (1983), a tongue-in-cheek novel incorporating all the possible buccaneer film plots into one.
- Black Ajax (1997), a novel about Tom Molineaux, a 19th-century black prizefighter in England. (As in Mr American, this novel is also connected to the Flashman series—in this case Sir Harry Flashman's father plays a minor role.)
- The Candlemass Road (1993), a short novel about the Border Reivers of the 16th century.
- The Reavers (2007), a comic novel of the Border Reivers, loosely based on the Candlemass Road, in the style of his earlier novel The Pyrates.
- Captain in Calico (2015), a novel posthumously issued.

=== Select articles ===
- "Long before the decay of lying", Chicago Tribune (1963) [Chicago, Ill] 9 Nov 1969: p6.

=== Radio ===
Fraser adapted The Candlemass Road, Flash for Freedom and Flashman at the Charge for BBC radio plays. Fraser was also a staunch critic of political correctness and enlarged upon his views on this matter (and others) on the BBC radio show, "Desert Island Discs." Terry Cringle of Manx Radio interviewed Fraser for an "Island Life" programme.

== Filmography ==
=== Screenplays ===
- The Three Musketeers (1973)
- The Four Musketeers (1974)
- Royal Flash (1975, adapted from his novel)
- The Prince and the Pauper (1977)
- Octopussy (1983)
- Red Sonja (1985)
- The Return of the Musketeers (1989)

=== Uncredited script revisions ===
- Force 10 from Navarone (1978)
- Superman (1978)
- Ashanti (1979)
- Superman II (1980)

=== Unproduced screenplays ===
Fraser also wrote the following scripts which were never filmed:

- Adaptation of The General Danced at Dawn commissioned in 1972
- Prince of Thieves from the Alexandre Dumas' version of the Robin Hood story
- Bulldog Drummond – adaptation of the novels commissioned by Thorn EMI in 1985 for producer Tim Burrill
- Hannah – adaptation of novel about the life of Helena Rubenstein with director Jack Clayton
- Thirteen Against the Bank – true story about a man who leaned how to beat the bank at Monte Carlo
- Adaptation of the William Tel story set against the background of the Battle of Mortgarten
- The Lone Ranger with director John Landis, circa 1990
- Out of Time – adaptation of a novel The Ice People about the discovery of a man and a woman from an ancient civilisation trapped in ice – for producer Pierre Spengler, circa 1985
- Berry and Co based on a story by Dornford Yates for director Lindsay Anderson
- Stortebekker for director Wolfgang Petersen about the medieval German pirate Klaus Störtebeker
- Quentin Durward from the novel by Sir Walter Scott
- Stillwell, a biopic of Joe Stillwell for director Martin Ritt at MGM (early 1980s)
- Adaptation of the James Clavell novel Tai-Pan, intended to star Steve McQueen (not used when the movie was made in 1986) – also a sequel
- Adaptation of Twenty Thousand Leagues Under the Seas for Dino de Laurentiis and director Richard Fleischer, circa 1985

== Popular culture ==
Fraser's Flashman at the Charge (1973) was serialised in the April and June 1973 issues of Playboy. The climactic sequence of Flashman in the Great Game (1975) was also excerpted there.

There is a Flashman Pub in Monte Carlo named after the main character in his Flashman series of books. There was another one in South Africa and a number of Flashman appreciation societies in North America.
