= Arthur Barbosa =

British artist

Barbosa, Artur
- Born: Artur Ernesto Teixeira de Vasconcelos Barbosa; 6 March 1908; Liverpool, United Kingdom
- Died: 5 October 1995 (aged 87)
- Education: Liverpool School of Art; Heatherley School of Fine Art; Central School of Art
- Known for: Illustration

Artur Ernesto Teixeira de Vasconcelos Barbosa (6 March 1908 – 5 October 1995) was an artist best known for his distinctive cover illustrations for Georgette Heyer and George MacDonald Fraser's The Flashman Papers novels, which he produced for 17 and 25 years respectively. Although always anglicising his first name, he disliked modern familiarity and preferred being known as Barbosa.

== Biography ==
He was born in Liverpool, his father was a Portuguese vice-consul, and his mother half-French. He attended St Edward's School, Oxford and later studied at Liverpool School of Art, Heatherley School of Fine Art and the Central School of Art. His first successful exhibitions were in London where he was a founder member of the Pandemonium Group alongside Nicolas Bentley, Eliot Hodgkin and Victor Reinganum. He illustrated for Everybody's Weekly and the Radio Times and produced his first book covers for London publishers.

In 1928 he worked on the interior of St Andrew's Church, West Kirby, designing the organ case, pew fronts and six-foot candlesticks.

From 1930 he began working as a designer for theatre, working with André Charlot, Kenneth Duffield and Cecil Landauin. At this time he also illustrated for Vogue, Harper's Bazaar, The Sketch, The Bystander, Night and Day and the Queen.

Barbosa spent the Second World War in the Portuguese section of the Ministry of Information then returning to illustrating he worked for Moss Bros.

During the 1950s he worked almost exclusively for American publishers and began his association with Georgette Heyer. His dust jacket designs for her post-war books and for those of George MacDonald Fraser were especially notable, though he also illustrated for other writers; Dorothy Dunnett, Doris Leslie, Maria Fagyas, Rona Randall, Dennis Wheatley and Hilary Ford to name but a few.

In the 1966, his friendship with Rex Harrison led him back to interior design, for the actor's house in Portofino, Italy. And later he undertook the refurbishment of the interior of Elizabeth Taylor's yacht Kalizma. He also counted Cecil Beaton and Laurence Olivier amongst his friends.

He continued working until a few months before his death and won a Golden Clio award for British sherry label designs featuring portraits of the Duke of Wellington and Edward Elgar

He developed a strong interest in royalty and assembled an extensive collection of original photographs of members of European and Russian royal families from 1850 to 1914.

== Personal life ==
He was married three times but had no children, his last marriage to Isobel lasted 34 years until his death in 1995, aged 89 despite his long-held belief that the ideal marriage was a contract for nine years.
