= List of Primetime Emmy Award records =

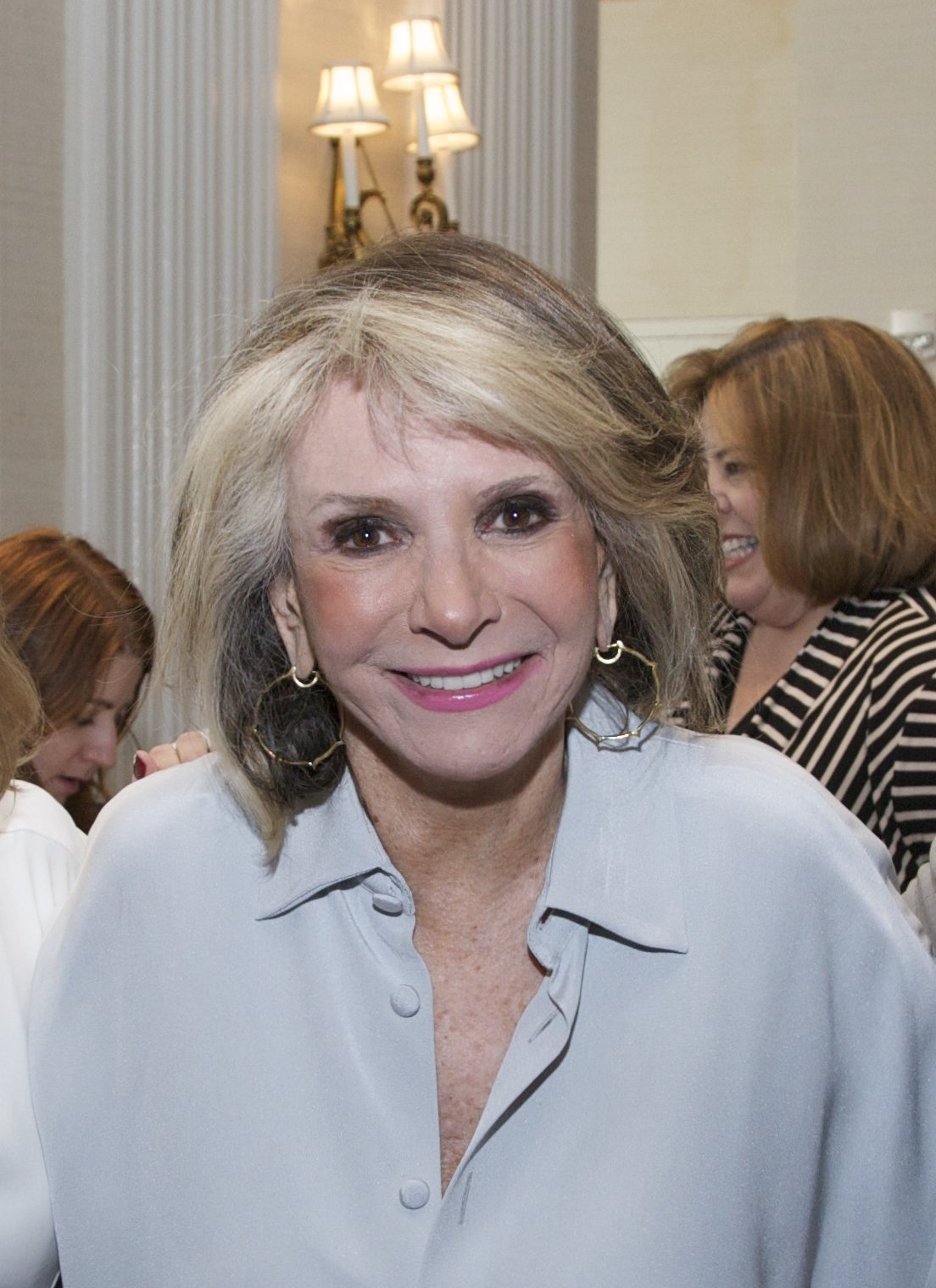
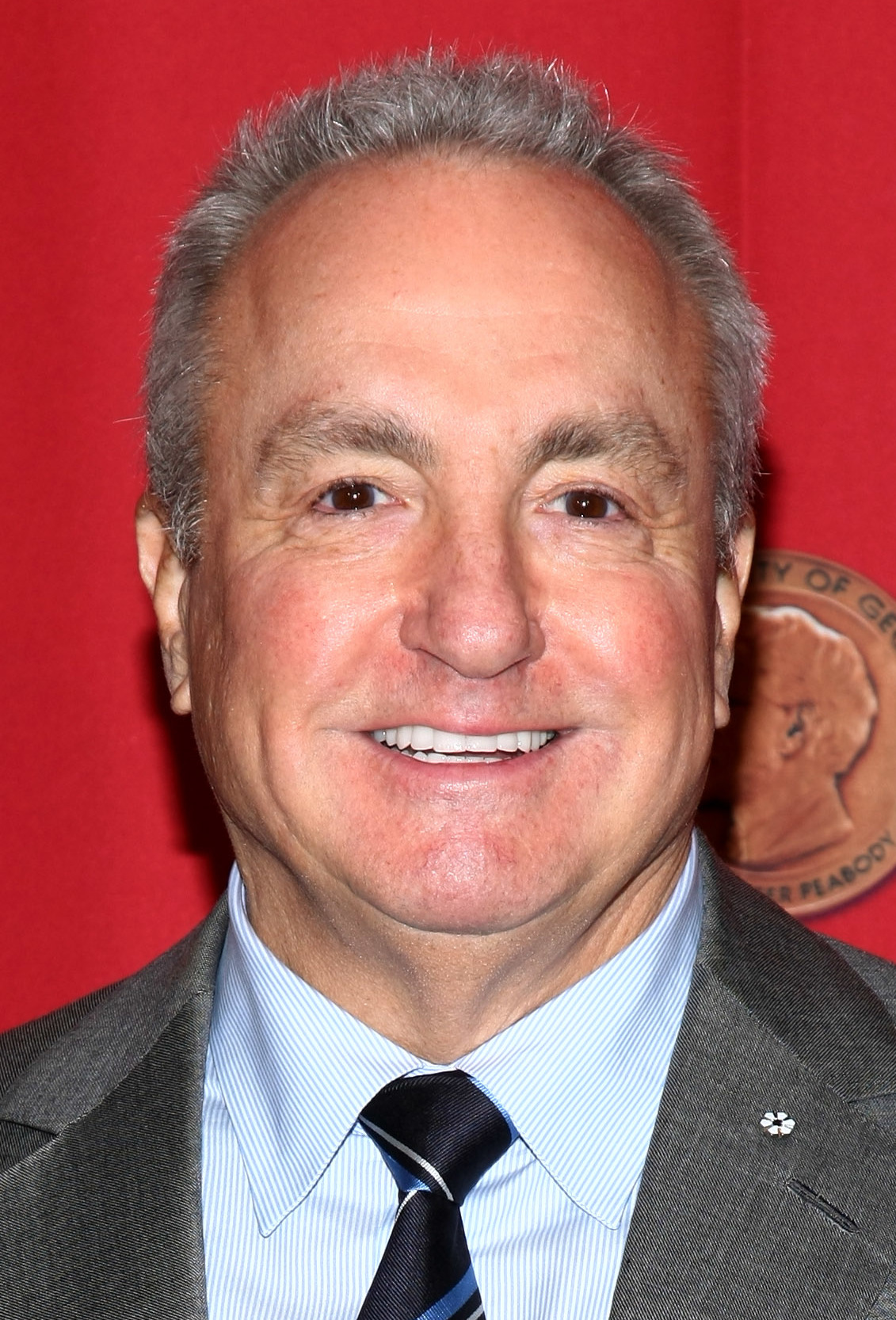
Sheila Nevins (31) and Lorne Michaels (107) hold the records with the most wins and nominations, respectively

This list of Primetime Emmy and Creative Arts Emmy awards records are current as of the 78th Primetime Emmy Awards and 78th Primetime Creative Arts Emmy Awards ceremonies to be held on September 5 to 6, and 14, 2026.

== Largest sweep of main categories for a program/series ==
Similar to the Academy Awards's "Big Five", the seven main categories of Primetime Emmy Awards are those for Outstanding Series, Lead Actor, Lead Actress, Supporting Actor, Supporting Actress, Directing and Writing for each three divisions of format programs: Comedy, Drama, and Limited or Anthology series.

Three television programs have won all seven main categories, while six programs have won six; All in the Family is the only program to have won six awards at the same ceremony twice. Winners are noted in bold.

Year	Division	Awards							Won
Year	Division	Program	Directing	Writing	Lead Actor	Lead Actress	Supporting Actor	Supporting Actress	Won
1972 (24th)	Comedy	All in the Family	**John Rich**	**Burt Styler** / Alan J. Levitt / Philip Mishkin / Norman Lear	**Carroll O'Connor**	**Jean Stapleton**	Rob Reiner	**Sally Struthers**	6
1978 (30th)	Comedy	All in the Family	**Paul Bogart**	**Barry Harman** / **Harve Brosten** / **Bob Schiller** / **Bob Weiskopf** / Erik Tarloff / Mel Tolkin / Larry Rhine	**Carroll O'Connor**	**Jean Stapleton**	**Rob Reiner**	Sally Struthers	6
1981 (33rd)	Drama	Hill Street Blues	Corey Allen / Georg Stanford Brown / **Robert Butler**	**Steven Bochco** / **Michael Kozoll** / Anthony Yerkovich	**Daniel J. Travanti**	**Barbara Babcock** / Veronica Hamel	**Michael Conrad** / Charles Haid / Bruce Weitz	Barbara Bosson / Betty Thomas	6
2004 (56th)	Miniseries	Angels in America	**Mike Nichols**	**Tony Kushner**	**Al Pacino**	**Meryl Streep** / Emma Thompson	Justin Kirk / Ben Shenkman / Patrick Wilson / **Jeffrey Wright**	**Mary-Louise Parker**	**7**
2015 (67th)	Limited Series	Olive Kitteridge	**Lisa Cholodenko**	**Jane Anderson**	**Richard Jenkins**	**Frances McDormand**	**Bill Murray**	Zoe Kazan	6
2020 (72nd)	Comedy	Schitt's Creek	**Andrew Cividino** / **Dan Levy**	**Dan Levy** / David West Read	**Eugene Levy**	**Catherine O'Hara**	**Dan Levy**	**Annie Murphy**	**7**
2021 (73rd)	Drama	The Crown	Benjamin Caron / **Jessica Hobbs**	**Peter Morgan**	**Josh O'Connor**	**Olivia Colman** / Emma Corrin	**Tobias Menzies**	**Gillian Anderson** / Helena Bonham Carter / Emerald Fennell	**7**
2023 (75th)	Comedy	The Bear	**Christopher Storer**		**Jeremy Allen White**	—N/a	**Ebon Moss-Bachrach**	**Ayo Edebiri**	6
2023 (75th)	Drama	Succession	**Mark Mylod** / Andrij Parekh / Lorene Scafaria	**Jesse Armstrong**	Brian Cox / **Kieran Culkin** / Jeremy Strong	**Sarah Snook**	Nicholas Braun / **Matthew Macfadyen** / Alan Ruck / Alexander Skarsgård	J. Smith-Cameron	6
2025 (77th)	Limited Series	Adolescence	**Philip Barantini**	**Jack Thorne** / **Stephen Graham**	**Stephen Graham**	—N/a	**Owen Cooper** / Ashley Walters	**Erin Doherty** / Christine Tremarco	6
2026 (78th)	Comedy	Widow's Bay	**Hiro Murai**	**Katie Dippold**	**Matthew Rhys**	—N/a	**Stephen Root**	Dale Dickey / **Kate O'Flynn**	6

== Overall wins ==
=== Individuals ===
Most wins for an individual

- Sheila Nevins – 31

Most wins for an individual in a single year

- Moira Demos – 4 (2016)
- Amy Sherman-Palladino – 4 (2018)
- Dan Levy – 4 (2020)
- Seth Rogen – 4 (2025)

Most wins for a person of color

- RuPaul – 14

Most wins for directing and writing

- Jon Stewart – 22

Most wins for producing

- Sheila Nevins – 31

Most wins for acting or performers

- Cloris Leachman, Julia Louis-Dreyfus, Jean Smart and Allison Janney – 8

Most wins for acting or a performer for the same role in the same program/series

- Julia Louis-Dreyfus as Selina Meyer for Veep – 6 (2012–2017)

Most wins for voice-over performances

- Hank Azaria, Dan Castellaneta, Seth MacFarlane and Maya Rudolph – 4

Most wins for voice-over performances for the same role in the same program/series

- Dan Castellaneta as Homer Simpson for The Simpsons – 4
- Seth MacFarlane as Stewie Griffin and various characters for Family Guy – 4
- Maya Rudolph as Connie the Hormone Monstress for Big Mouth – 4

Most wins for Outstanding Animated Program

- Matt Groening for The Simpsons and Futurama – 14 (1990–1991, 1995, 1997–1998, 2000–2003, 2006, 2008, 2011, 2019, 2023)

Most wins for Outstanding Individual Performance in a Variety or Music Program

- Harvey Korman – 4 (1969, 1971–1972, 1974)

Most wins for Outstanding Host for a Reality or Competition Program

- RuPaul Charles for RuPaul's Drag Race – 8 (2016–2023)

Most wins for a television program/series

- Saturday Night Live – 95

Most wins for an online-streaming original program/series

- The Crown – 24

Most wins for a television program/series for its first season

- Shōgun – 18 (2024)

Most wins for a television program/series for its final season

- Game of Thrones – 12 (2019)

Most wins for a television program/series in a single year

- Shōgun – 18 (2024)

Most wins for a single episode

- "Boardwalk Empire" (Boardwalk Empire) – 6 (2011)
- "Battle of the Bastards" (Game of Thrones) – 6 (2016)

=== Networks ===
Most wins for a network

- NBC – over 1,000

Most wins for a network in a single year

- CBS – 44 (1974)
- Netflix – 44 (2021)

Most wins for a comedy-genre television program/series

- Frasier and The Simpsons – 38

Most wins for a comedy-genre television program/series for its first season

- Widow's Bay – 14 (2026)

Most wins for a comedy-genre television program/series for its final season

- Schitt's Creek – 9 (2020)

Most wins for a comedy-genre television program/series in single year

- Widow's Bay – 14 (2026)

Most wins for a drama-genre television program/series

- Game of Thrones – 59

Most wins for a drama-genre television program/series for its first season

- Shōgun – 18 (2024)

Most wins for a drama-genre television program/series for its final season

- Game of Thrones – 12 (2019)

Most wins for a drama-genre television program/series in a single year

- Shōgun – 18 (2024)

Most wins for a limited program/series

- John Adams – 13

Most wins for a television film

- Behind the Candelabra and Eleanor and Franklin – 11

Most wins for an animated television program/series

- The Simpsons – 38

Most wins for an animated television program/series in a single year

- The Simpsons – 6 (1992)
- Love, Death & Robots – 6 (2021)

Most wins for a variety special

- The Kennedy Center Honors – 16

Most wins for a variety program/series

- Saturday Night Live – 95

Most wins for a reality-competition program/series

- RuPaul's Drag Race – 24

Most wins for Outstanding Comedy Series

- Frasier – 5 (1994–1998)
- Modern Family – 5 (2010–2014)

Most wins for Outstanding Drama Series

- Hill Street Blues – 4 (1981–1984)
- L.A. Law – 4 (1987, 1989–1991)
- The West Wing – 4 (2000–2003)
- Mad Men – 4 (2008–2011)
- Game of Thrones – 4 (2015–2016, 2018–2019)

Most wins for Outstanding Limited or Anthology Series

- Prime Suspect – 3 (1993–1994, 1997)

Most wins for Outstanding Television Movie

- Black Mirror – 3 (2017–2019)

Most wins for Outstanding Animated Program

- The Simpsons – 12 (1990–1991, 1995, 1997–1998, 2000–2001, 2003, 2006, 2008, 2019, 2023)

Most wins for Outstanding Variety, Music, or Comedy Special

- The Kennedy Center Honors – 7 (1994, 1996, 2009–2013)

Most wins for Outstanding Variety, Music, or Comedy Series

- The Daily Show with Jon Stewart – 11 (2003–2012, 2015)

Most wins for acting in a comedy-genre television program/series

- The Mary Tyler Moore Show and The Simpsons – 16

Most wins for acting in a comedy-genre television program/series in a single year

- The Simpsons (1992) – 6

Most wins for acting in a drama-genre television program/series

- Breaking Bad, The Sopranos, and The West Wing – 9

Most wins for acting in a drama-genre television program/series in a single year

- The Crown – 5 (2021)

Most wins for acting in a limited program/series

- American Crime Story, American Horror Story and Angels in America – 4

Most wins for acting in a limited program/series in a single year

- Angels in America – 4 (2003)

Most wins for acting in a television film

- The Glass Menagerie – 4

Most wins for acting in an animated television program/series

- The Simpsons – 16

Most wins for acting in an animated television program/series in a single year

- The Simpsons – 6 (1992)

== Overall nominations ==
Most nominations for a network in a single year

- Netflix – 160 (2020)

Most nominations for a Television Program

- Saturday Night Live – 317

Most nominations for a Comedy Series

- Cheers – 117

Most nominations for a Drama Series

- Game of Thrones – 161

Most nominations for a Limited Series

- Roots – 37

Most nominations for a Television Movie

- Grey Gardens – 17
- Eleanor and Franklin – 17
- Bury My Heart at Wounded Knee – 17
- Eleanor and Franklin: The White House Years – 17

Most nominations for an Animated Program

- The Simpsons – 99

Most nominations for a Reality Competition Program

- Dancing with the Stars – 129

Most nominations for a Variety Series

- Saturday Night Live – 306

Most nominations for a Variety Special

- The Kennedy Center Honors – 59

Most nominations for Outstanding Host for a Reality or Reality Competition Program

- RuPaul Charles – 11

Most nominations for a Comedy Series for its final season

- Hacks – 24 (2026)

Most nominations for a Comedy Series for its first season

- The Studio – 23 (2025)

Most nominations for a Drama Series for its final season

- Game of Thrones – 32 (2019)

Most nominations for a Drama Series for its first season

- NYPD Blue – 27 (1994)

Most nominations for an individual in a single year

- Louis C.K. – 9 (2013)

Most nominations for an individual

- Lorne Michaels – 107

Most nominations for an individual (actress)

- Cloris Leachman – 22

Most nominations for an individual without a win

- Angela Lansbury – 18

Most nominations for an streaming original program

- The Crown – 87

Most nominations for Outstanding Drama Series

- Law & Order – 11

Most nominations for Outstanding Comedy Series

- Cheers – 11
- M*A*S*H – 11

Most nominations for Outstanding Animated Program

- The Simpsons – 31

Most nominations for Outstanding Short Form Animated Program

- Robot Chicken – 12

Most nominations for Outstanding Competition Program

- The Amazing Race – 22

Most nominations for Outstanding Variety Series

- Saturday Night Live – 20

Most nominations for Outstanding Variety Special

- The Kennedy Center Honors – 11

Most nominations for Outstanding Individual Performance in a Variety or Music Program

- Billy Crystal – 12

Most nominations for a Variety Series in a single year

- Saturday Night Live – 22 (2017)

Most nominations for a Reality-Competition Program in a single year

- American Idol (2011), Dancing with the Stars (2009), RuPaul's Drag Race (2018, 2020), and The Voice (2014) – 10

Most nominations for a series without a win in a single year

- The Handmaid's Tale – 21 (2021)

Most nominations for an Outstanding Animated Program (both main and short-form) without a win

- Steven Universe – 6 (2015–2020)

Most nominations for an Animated Program in a single year

- The Simpsons – 9 (1990, 2009)

Most nominations for acting in a series in a single year

- Succession – 14 (2022)

Most nominations for a Comedy Series in a single year

- Hacks – 24 (2026)

Most nominations for a Drama Series in a single year

- Game of Thrones – 32 (2019)

Most nominations for acting in a Television Movie

- And the Band Played On, The Glass Menagerie, and The Normal Heart – 6

Most nominations for acting in a Variety Special

- Hamilton – 7

Most nominations for acting in a Limited Series

- Roots – 13

Most nominations for a Television Program without a win

- Better Call Saul – 53

== First wins ==
First non-US television series to win a major Primetime Emmy for each divisions

- Fleabag (U.K.) – Outstanding Comedy Series (2019)
- Elizabeth R (U.K.) – Outstanding Drama Series (1972)
- Tom Brown's Schooldays (U.K.) – Outstanding Limited or Anthology Series (1973)

First Canadian television series to win a major Primetime Emmy

- Schitt's Creek – Outstanding Comedy Series (2020)

First non-English language television series to win a major Primetime Emmy

- Shōgun (Japanese) – Outstanding Drama Series (2024)

First video game-based television series to be win a Primetime Emmy for the major program/series categories

- Arcane (Based on League of Legends by Riot Games) – Outstanding Animated Program (2022)

First television series to be adapted from a work of the same name to win Primetime Emmys

- Shōgun (NBC) – Outstanding Limited or Anthology Series (1981) and Shōgun (FX) – Outstanding Drama Series (2024); both series are based on the 1975 novel by James Clavell

First Asian-born person to win a Primetime Emmy for producing

- Jess Española (Philippines) – Outstanding Animated Program (2008)
- Gideon Raff (Israel) – Outstanding Drama Series (2011)
- Hiro Murai (Japan) – Outstanding Comedy Series (2024)

First Asian-born person to win a Primetime Emmy for writing a drama series

- Gideon Raff (Israel) – Outstanding Writing for a Drama Series (2011)

First Asian-born person to win a Primetime Emmy for directing a drama series

- Hwang Dong-hyuk (South Korea) – Outstanding Directing for a Drama Series (2022)

First Asian-born person to win a Primetime Emmy for directing a comedy series

- Hiro Murai (Japan) – Outstanding Directing for a Comedy Series for Widow's Bay (Apple TV+) (2026)

First East Asian-born people to win Outstanding Drama Series

- Eriko Miyagawa and Hiroyuki Sanada (Japan) – Shōgun (2024)

First Asian-born actor to win a Primetime Emmy for acting

- Lee Jung-jae (South Korea) – Outstanding Lead Actor in a Drama Series (2022)

First Asian-born actress to win a Primetime Emmy for acting

- Anna Sawai (Japan) – Outstanding Lead Actress in a Drama Series (2024)

First Asian-diaspora actor to win a Primetime Emmy for acting

- Riz Ahmed (U.K.-Pakistan) – Outstanding Lead Actor in a Limited or Anthology Series or Movie (2017)

First Asian-diaspora actress to win a Primetime Emmy for acting

- Archie Panjabi (U.K.-India) – Outstanding Supporting Actress in a Drama Series (2010)

First actors/actresses to win Primetime Emmys for non-English speaking roles

- Lee Jung-jae (Korean) – Outstanding Lead Actor in a Drama Series (2022)
- Anna Sawai (Japanese) – Outstanding Lead Actress in a Drama Series (2024)

First performer of Generation Z to win in a major acting category

- Owen Cooper (age 15) for Adolescence (Netflix) – Outstanding Supporting Actor in a Limited or Anthology Series or Movie (2025)

First actor/actress to win for every season of a television series

- Bill Cosby for I Spy (NBC) – Outstanding Lead Actor in a Drama Series (1968)
- Jean Smart for Hacks (HBO Max) – Outstanding Lead Actress in a Comedy Series (2026)

First actor/actress to win all three Primetime Emmy acting awards for comedy

- Betty White – Outstanding Supporting Actress in a Comedy Series for The Mary Tyler Moore Show (1975), Outstanding Lead Actress in a Comedy Series for The Golden Girls (1986), and Outstanding Guest Actress in a Comedy Series for The John Larroquette Show (1996)

First actor/actress to win all three Primetime Emmy lead acting awards

- Matthew Rhys – Outstanding Lead Actor in a Drama Series for The Americans (2018), Outstanding Lead Actor in a Comedy Series for Widow's Bay (2026), and Outstanding Lead Actor in a Limited or Anthology Series or Movie for The Beast in Me (2026)

First actor/actress to win two Primetime Emmy lead acting awards in the same year

- Matthew Rhys – Outstanding Lead Actor in a Comedy Series for Widow's Bay (2026) and Outstanding Lead Actor in a Limited or Anthology Series or Movie for The Beast in Me (2026)

== First nominations ==
First non-US television series to be nominated a Primetime Emmy for the major program/series categories

- The Avengers (U.K.) – Outstanding Drama Series (1967)
- Tom Brown's Schooldays and The Last of the Mohicans (both U.K.), and The Life of Leonardo da Vinci (Italy/Spain/France) – Outstanding Limited or Anthology Series (1973)

First animated television series to be nominated a Primetime Emmy for the major program/series categories

- The Flintstones – Outstanding Comedy Series (1961)

First non-English language television series to be nominated a Primetime Emmy for the major program/series categories

- Squid Game (Korean) – Outstanding Drama Series (2022)
- The Life of Leonardo da Vinci (Italian) – Outstanding Limited or Anthology Series (1973)

First video game-based television series to be nominated a Primetime Emmy for the major program/series categories

- The Last of Us (Based on a video game of the same name by Naughty Dog) – Outstanding Drama Series (2023/2024)
- Carmen Sandiego (Based on a video game of the same name by Broderbund) – Outstanding Children's Program (2019)
- Arcane (Based on League of Legends by Riot Games) – Outstanding Animated Program (2022)

First television series to be adapted from a work of the same name to be nominated Primetime Emmys for the major program/series categories

- Shōgun (NBC) – Outstanding Limited or Anthology Series (1981) and Shōgun (FX) – Outstanding Drama Series (2024); both series are based on the 1975 novel by James Clavell

First Asians-born to be nominated a Primetime Emmy for producing, directing, or writing

- Jess Española (Philippines) – Outstanding Animated Program (2008)

First Asians-born to be nominated a Primetime Emmy for acting

- Toshiro Mifune (Japan) - Outstanding Lead Actor in a Limited or Anthology Series or Movie (1981)
- Yoko Shimada (Japan) - Outstanding Lead Actress in a Limited or Anthology Series or Movie (1981)
- Yūki Meguro (Japan) - Outstanding Supporting Actor in a Limited or Anthology Series or Movie (1981)

First Italian to be nominated a Primetime Emmy for acting

- Philippe Leroy – Outstanding Lead Actor in a Limited or Anthology Series or Movie (1973)

First actors/actresses to be nominated Primetime Emmys for non-English speaking roles

- Philippe Leroy – Outstanding Lead Actor in a Limited or Anthology Series or Movie (1973)

First non-binary person to be nominated a Primetime Emmy for producing, directing, or writing

- Rebecca Sugar – Outstanding Short Form Animated Program (2011)

First centenarian to be nominated a Primetime Emmy

- Norman Lear for Live in Front of a Studio Audience (ABC) – Outstanding Variety Special (Live) (2022)

== Age-related records ==
Oldest winner

- Norman Lear (age 98) as producer for Live in Front of a Studio Audience (ABC) – Outstanding Variety Special (Live) (2020)

Oldest nominee

- David Attenborough (age 100) for A Gorilla Story: Told by David Attenborough (Netflix) and Ocean with David Attenborough (National Geographic) – Outstanding Narrator (2026)

Oldest actor/actress to be nominated in a major acting category

- Carol Burnett (age 91) for Palm Royale (Apple TV+) – Outstanding Supporting Actress in a Comedy Series (2024)

Oldest actor/actress to win a Primetime Emmy Award for Outstanding Lead Actress in a Limited or Anthology Series or Movie

- Sally Field (79) for Remarkably Bright Creatures (Netflix) – Outstanding Lead Actress in a Limited or Anthology Series or Movie (2026)

Youngest winner

- Roxana Zal (age 14) for Something About Amelia (ABC) – Outstanding Supporting Actress in a Limited Series or Special (1984)

Youngest two-time winner

- Zendaya (age 26) for Euphoria (HBO) – Outstanding Lead Actress in a Drama Series (twice for 2020 and 2022)

Youngest nominee

- Keshia Knight Pulliam (age 6) for The Cosby Show (NBC) – Outstanding Supporting Actress in a Comedy Series (1986)

== See also ==
- List of Primetime Emmy Award winners
- List of Primetime Emmy Awards ceremonies
