= 25th Primetime Emmy Awards =

1973 American television programming awards

- Date: May 20, 1973
- Location: Shubert Theatre, Los Angeles, California
- Presented by: Academy of Television Arts and Sciences
- Hosted by: Johnny Carson

Highlights
- Most awards: The Waltons (5)
- Most nominations: The Waltons (9)
- Outstanding Comedy Series: All in the Family
- Outstanding Drama Series: The Waltons
- Outstanding Limited Series: Tom Brown's Schooldays
- Outstanding Variety Musical Series: The Julie Andrews Hour

Television/radio coverage
- Network: ABC

The 25th Emmy Awards, later known as the 25th Primetime Emmy Awards, were handed out on May 20, 1973. The ceremony was hosted by Johnny Carson. 35 awards were presented. This would be the final ceremony that included daytime categories, as the Daytime Emmy Awards premiered the next year. Winners are listed in bold and series' networks are in parentheses.

The top shows of the night were All in the Family which won its third consecutive Primetime Emmy Award for Outstanding Comedy Series, and The Waltons. The Waltons, in its first season, had the most major nominations heading into the ceremony (9), and won the most major awards on the night with five.

== Winners and nominees ==
=== Programs ===
Programs
| **Outstanding Comedy Series**: **All in the Family (CBS)**; M*A*S*H (CBS); The Mary Tyler Moore Show (CBS); Maude (CBS); Sanford and Son (NBC) | **Outstanding Drama Series - Continuing**: **The Waltons (CBS)**; Cannon (CBS); Columbo (NBC); Hawaii Five-O (CBS); Kung Fu (ABC); Mannix (CBS) |
| **Outstanding Variety Musical Series**: **The Julie Andrews Hour (ABC)**; The Carol Burnett Show (CBS); The Dick Cavett Show (ABC); The Flip Wilson Show (NBC); The Sonny & Cher Comedy Hour (CBS) | **Outstanding Single Program - Variety or Musical - Variety and Popular Music**: **Liza with a Z (NBC)**; Applause (CBS); Once Upon a Mattress (CBS) |
| **Outstanding Program Achievement in Daytime Drama**: **The Edge of Night (CBS)**; Days of Our Lives (NBC); The Doctors (NBC); One Life to Live (ABC) | **Outstanding Program Achievement in Daytime**: **Dinah's Place (NBC)**; **Three on a Match (NBC) – Bill Cullen**; The Hollywood Squares (NBC); The Hollywood Squares (NBC) – Paul Lynde; The Hollywood Squares (NBC) – Peter Marshall; Jeopardy! (NBC); The Mike Douglas Show (Syndicated); Password (ABC) |
| **Outstanding Achievement in Children's Programming - Informational/Factual**: **ABC Afterschool Special (ABC): "The Last of the Curlews"**; **A Picture of Us (NBC)**; ABC Afterschool Special (ABC): "The Last of the Curlews" – Jameson Brewer; In the News (CBS); Make a Wish (ABC) | **Outstanding Achievement in Children's Programming - Entertainment/Fictional**: **The Electric Company (PBS)**; **Sesame Street (PBS)**; **Zoom (PBS)**; The Electric Company (PBS) – Henry Behar; The Electric Company (PBS); Sesame Street (PBS) – Robert Myhrum; Sesame Street (PBS) – Joe Raposo; You're Not Elected, Charlie Brown (CBS) |
| **Outstanding Achievement in Sports Programming**: **1972 Summer Olympics (ABC)**; **1972 Summer Olympics (ABC) – Roone Arledge**; **ABC's Wide World of Sports (ABC)**; 1972 Summer Olympics (ABC) – Keith Jackson; 1972 Summer Olympics (ABC) – Jim McKay; ABC College Football (ABC); NFL Monday Night Football (ABC); Super Bowl VII (NBC) | **Outstanding Single Program - Drama or Comedy**: **A War of Children (CBS)**; That Certain Summer (ABC); Long Day's Journey into Night (ABC); The Marcus-Nelson Murders (CBS); The Red Pony (NBC) |
| **Outstanding New Series**: **America (NBC)**; The Julie Andrews Hour (ABC); Kung Fu (ABC); M*A*S*H (CBS); Maude (CBS); The Waltons (CBS) | **Outstanding Limited Series**: **Tom Brown's Schooldays (PBS)**; The Last of the Mohicans (PBS); The Life of Leonardo da Vinci (CBS) |

=== Acting ===
==== Lead performances ====
Acting
| **Outstanding Continued Performance** **by an Actor in a Leading Role in a Comedy Series**: **Jack Klugman as Oscar Madison in The Odd Couple (ABC)**; Alan Alda as Hawkeye Pierce in M*A*S*H (CBS); Redd Foxx as Fred G. Sanford in Sanford and Son (NBC); Carroll O'Connor as Archie Bunker in All in the Family (CBS); Tony Randall as Felix Unger in The Odd Couple (ABC) | **Outstanding Continued Performance** **by an Actress in a Leading Role in a Comedy Series**: **Mary Tyler Moore as Mary Richards in The Mary Tyler Moore Show (CBS) (Episode: "Put on a Happy Face")**; Bea Arthur as Maude Findlay in Maude (CBS); Jean Stapleton as Edith Bunker in All in the Family (CBS) |
| **Outstanding Continued Performance** **by an Actor in a Leading Role (Drama Series - Continuing)**: **Richard Thomas as John-Boy Walton in The Waltons (CBS)**; David Carradine as Kwai Chang Caine in Kung Fu (ABC); Mike Connors as Joe Mannix in Mannix (CBS); William Conrad as Frank Cannon in Cannon (CBS); Peter Falk as Lt. Columbo in Columbo (NBC) | **Outstanding Continued Performance** **by an Actress in a Leading Role (Drama Series - Continuing)**: **Michael Learned as Olivia Walton in The Waltons (CBS)**; Lynda Day George as Lisa Casey in Mission: Impossible (CBS); Susan Saint James as Sally McMillan in McMillan & Wife (NBC) |
| **Outstanding Continued Performance by an Actor in a Leading Role (Drama/Comedy - Limited Episodes)**: **Anthony Murphy as Tom Brown in Tom Brown's Schooldays (PBS)**; John Abineri as Chingachgook in The Last of the Mohicans (PBS); Philippe Leroy as Leonardo da Vinci in The Life of Leonardo da Vinci (CBS) | **Outstanding Continued Performance by an Actress in a Leading Role (Drama/Comedy - Limited Episodes)**: **Susan Hampshire as Becky Sharp in Vanity Fair (PBS)**; Vivien Heilbron as Rachel Verinder in The Moonstone (PBS); Margaret Tyzack as Bette in Cousin Bette (PBS) |

==== Supporting performances ====
| **Outstanding Performance by an Actor in a Supporting Role in a Comedy**: **Ted Knight as Ted Baxter in The Mary Tyler Moore Show (CBS)**; Edward Asner as Lou Grant in The Mary Tyler Moore Show (CBS); Gary Burghoff as Radar O'Reilly in M*A*S*H (CBS); Rob Reiner as Michael Stivic in All in the Family (CBS); McLean Stevenson as Henry Blake in M*A*S*H (CBS) | **Outstanding Performance by an Actress in a Supporting Role in a Comedy**: **Valerie Harper as Rhoda Morgenstern in The Mary Tyler Moore Show (CBS) (Episode: "Rhoda Morgenstern: Minneapolis to New York")**; Cloris Leachman as Phyllis Lindstrom in The Mary Tyler Moore Show (CBS); Sally Struthers as Gloria Stivic in All in the Family (CBS) |
| **Outstanding Performance by an Actor in a Supporting Role in a Drama**: **Scott Jacoby as Nick Salter in That Certain Summer (ABC)**; James Brolin as Dr. Steven Kiley in Marcus Welby, M.D. (ABC); Will Geer as Zebulon Walton in The Waltons (CBS) | **Outstanding Performance by an Actress in a Supporting Role in a Drama**: **Ellen Corby as Esther Walton in The Waltons (CBS)**; Gail Fisher as Peggy Fair in Mannix (CBS); Nancy Walker as Mildred in McMillan & Wife (NBC) |

==== Single performances ====
| **Outstanding Single Performance by an Actor in a Leading Role**: **Laurence Olivier as James Tyrone Sr. in Long Day's Journey into Night (ABC)**; Henry Fonda as Carl Tiflin in The Red Pony (NBC); Hal Holbrook as Doug Salter in That Certain Summer (ABC); Telly Savalas as Theo Kojak in The Marcus-Nelson Murders (CBS) | **Outstanding Single Performance by an Actress in a Leading Role**: **Cloris Leachman as Victoria Douglas in A Brand New Life (ABC)**; Lauren Bacall as Margo Channing in Applause (CBS); Hope Lange as Janet Salter in That Certain Summer (ABC) |

=== Directing ===
Directing
| **Outstanding Directorial Achievement in Comedy**: **The Mary Tyler Moore Show (CBS): "It's Whether You Win or Lose" – Jay Sandrich**; All in the Family (CBS): "The Bunkers and the Swingers" – John Rich and Bob LaHendro; M*A*S*H (CBS): "Pilot" – Gene Reynolds | **Outstanding Directorial Achievement in Drama -** **A Single Program of a Series with Continuing Characters and/or Theme**: **Kung Fu (ABC): "An Eye for an Eye" – Jerry Thorpe**; Columbo (NBC): "The Most Dangerous Match" – Edward M. Abroms; The Waltons (CBS): "The Love Story" – Lee Philips |
| **Outstanding Directorial Achievement in Variety or Music**: **The Julie Andrews Hour (ABC): "Lisa Doolittle and Mary Poppins" – Bill Davis**; The Flip Wilson Show (NBC): "Roberta Flack and Burt Reynolds" – Tim Kiley; The Sonny & Cher Comedy Hour (CBS): "Mike Connors" – Art Fisher | **Outstanding Directorial Achievement in Comedy, Variety or Music**: **Liza with a Z (NBC) – Bob Fosse**; Duke Ellington... We Love You Madly (CBS) – Stan Harris; Get Happy (NBC) – Martin Charnin and Dave Wilson; Once Upon a Mattress (CBS) – Dave Powers and Ron Field; You're a Good Man, Charlie Brown (CBS) – Walter C. Miller |
**Outstanding Directorial Achievement in Drama - A Single Program**: **The Marcus-Nelson Murders (CBS) – Joseph Sargent**; That Certain Summer (ABC) – Lamont Johnson; A War of Children (CBS) – George Schaefer

=== Writing ===
Writing
| **Outstanding Writing Achievement in Comedy**: **All in the Family (CBS): "The Bunkers and the Swingers" – Michael Ross, Bernard West and Lee Kalcheim**; M*A*S*H (CBS): "Pilot" – Larry Gelbart; The Mary Tyler Moore Show (CBS): "The Good-Time News" – Allan Burns and James L. Brooks | **Outstanding Writing Achievement in Drama**: **The Waltons (CBS): "The Scholar" – John McGreevey**; Columbo (NBC): "Étude in Black" – Steven Bochco; The Waltons (CBS): "The Love Story" – Earl Hamner Jr. |
| **Outstanding Writing Achievement in Comedy, Variety or Music**: **Acts of Love and Other Comedies (ABC)**; The Lily Tomlin Show (CBS); Liza with a Z (NBC) | **Outstanding Writing Achievement in Variety or Music**: **The Carol Burnett Show (CBS): "Steve Lawrence and Lily Tomlin"**; The Flip Wilson Show (NBC): "Sammy Davis Jr., Ed Sullivan and Marilyn Michaels"; The Julie Andrews Hour (ABC): "Eliza Doolittle and Mary Poppins" |
| **Outstanding Writing Achievement in Drama - Original Teleplay**: **The Marcus-Nelson Murders (CBS) – Abby Mann**; Hawkins on Murder (CBS) – David Karp; That Certain Summer (ABC) – Richard Levinson and William Link | **Outstanding Writing Achievement in Drama - Adaptation**: **The House Without a Christmas Tree (CBS) – Eleanor Perry**; Go Ask Alice (ABC) – Ellen M. Violett; The Red Pony (NBC) – Robert Totten and Ron Bishop |

== Most major nominations ==
Networks with multiple major nominations (Note: "Major" constitutes the categories listed above: Program, Acting, Directing, and Writing. Does not include the technical categories.)
| Network | Number of Nominations |
|---|---|
| CBS | 64 |
| ABC | 31 |
| NBC | 28 |
| PBS | 14 |

Programs with multiple major nominations
| Program | Category | Network | Number of Nominations |
|---|---|---|---|
| The Waltons | Drama | CBS | 9 |
| The Mary Tyler Moore Show | Comedy | CBS | 8 |
| All in the Family | Comedy | CBS | 7 |
| M*A*S*H | Comedy | CBS | 7 |
| That Certain Summer | Special | ABC | 6 |
| 1972 Summer Olympics | Sports | ABC | 4 |
| Columbo | Drama | NBC | 4 |
| The Julie Andrews Hour | Variety | ABC | 4 |
| Kung Fu | Drama | ABC | 4 |
| The Marcus-Nelson Murders | Special | CBS | 4 |
| The Electric Company | Children's | PBS | 3 |
| The Flip Wilson Show | Variety | NBC | 3 |
| The Hollywood Squares | Daytime | NBC | 3 |
| Liza with a Z | Variety | NBC | 3 |
| Mannix | Drama | CBS | 3 |
| Maude | Comedy | CBS | 3 |
| The Red Pony | Special | NBC | 3 |
| Sesame Street | Children's | PBS | 3 |
| ABC Afterschool Special: "The Last of the Curlews" | Children's | ABC | 2 |
| Applause | Variety | CBS | 2 |
| Cannon | Drama | CBS | 2 |
| The Carol Burnett Show | Variety | CBS | 2 |
| The Last of the Mohicans | Limited | PBS | 2 |
| The Life of Leonardo da Vinci | Limited | CBS | 2 |
| Long Day's Journey Into Night | Special | ABC | 2 |
| McMillan & Wife | Drama | NBC | 2 |
| The Odd Couple | Comedy | ABC | 2 |
| Once Upon a Mattress | Variety | CBS | 2 |
| Sanford and Son | Comedy | NBC | 2 |
| The Sonny & Cher Comedy Hour | Variety | CBS | 2 |
| Tom Brown's Schooldays | Limited | PBS | 2 |

== Most major awards ==
Networks with multiple major awards
| Network | Number of Awards |
|---|---|
| CBS | 17 |
| ABC | 11 |
| PBS | 6 |
| NBC | 5 |

Programs with multiple major awards
| Program | Category | Network | Number of Awards |
|---|---|---|---|
| The Waltons | Drama | CBS | 5 |
| The Mary Tyler Moore Show | Comedy | CBS | 4 |
| 1972 Summer Olympics | Sports | ABC | 2 |
| All in the Family | Comedy | CBS | 2 |
| The Julie Andrews Hour | Variety | ABC | 2 |
| Liza with a Z | Variety | NBC | 2 |
| The Marcus-Nelson Murders | Limited | CBS | 2 |
| Tom Brown's Schooldays | Limited | PBS | 2 |
