= Kapampangan =

Kapampangan, Capampañgan or Pampangan may refer to:

- Kapampangan people, of the Philippines
- Kapampangan language, their Austronesian language
