= Prehistory of Pampanga =

Pampanga's Location in the Philippines

Pampanga lies within the Central Plain region and has a total land area of 2,180.70 square kilometers. Together with Bulacan, Nueva Ecija, Pangasinan and Tarlac, the region includes a total area of approximately 5,900 square miles, mostly composed of lowlands and arable areas.

The original Kapampangan region was ten times larger than the present borders shown on the map. 35,000 years ago Neolithic is from 12,000 BP only. The Candaba adze ax is estimated at 3,000BP only(Neolithic era), a series of Mt. Pinatubo eruptions dumped lava, ashes, tephra and lahar into the sea, forming the present landmass of the region.

== Pre-Spanish to Spanish Period ==
Before the Spaniards arrived in Pampanga, the Kapampangans were expert in constructing sailboats. These were made using hardwood, such as apitong and baticuling, for dwelling, fishing and trading. Moreover, the caracoa, owned by the chieftains, were war boats which predominantly carried warriors. These boats were light and crescent-shaped. Due to these features, boats were known to be swift and easy to maneuver especially on the cunning waves of the old Pampanga River.

On the other hand, Chinese junks were flat-bottomed in order to navigate shallow waters without getting damaged. During the Spanish regime, these junks were used as carriers to transport goods from Pampanga, and then to be sold along the esteros, between Sta. Cruz and Quiapo markets. Its five-stage masts provided power to secure the goods.

== Archaeology of Pampanga ==
Shards of Tradeware Ceramics from Porac, Pampanga

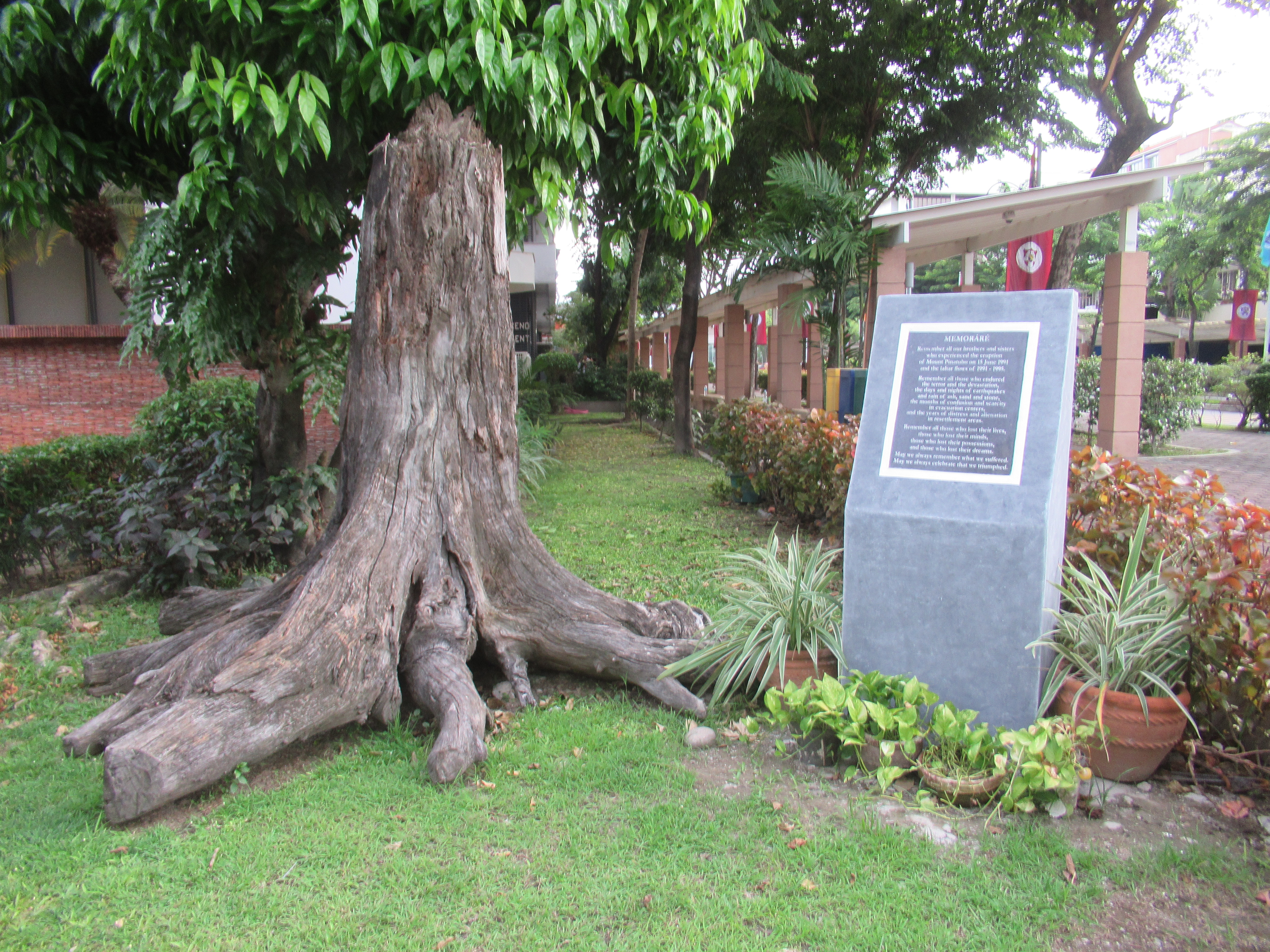
2,970 Year-old prehistoric tree from Abacan River

Pampanga is among the earliest provinces which underwent through scientific archaeological research. As early as the American colonial period, there have been several ventures by different groups of scientists, most of which are foreigners. All these expeditions aimed to give contributions in understanding the history of the said province as a whole.

=== Porac ===
One of the most famous archaeological sites in the province is the Hacienda Ramona site, located near Porac, Pampanga. Originally it was a plantation, owned by Warner, Barnes, & Co., an American company. It was first explored by a team led by G.M. Goodall from 1935 to 1936, where they found an early and remarkable Porcelain-Age site. In 1939, a more extensive exploration was done in the area, hoping to retrieve more artifacts from the site. The team, which includes E.D. Hester, George Woods, and Herman Costenoble, found a large quantity of burial jars and smaller ceramic pieces of various shapes and sizes. Sadly, only few of these artifacts were preserved – most of them were either lost or destroyed during the war.

The Hacienda Ramona site is of great relevance in reconstructing the area's earlier times. Since the site is large, it provided many artifacts such as jars, porcelain, and bowls. This is important, since it establishes the fact that the early Pampangueῆos already had a fixed and thriven trade system with the Chinese merchants. The archaeologists were also able to identify three periods of inhabitation within the site. They discovered an extensive burial area dated from the Late Tang to the Middle Sung dynasty, a village site dated from the Late Sung to the Yuan dynasty, and a smaller village site dated to the beginning of the Ming period. The age and order of the sites were identified mostly because of the patterns and motifs embedded in the porcelains (since every Chinese dynasty has its own unique way of designing the pottery within its era).

Besides the Hacienda Ramona site, other sites have also been unearthed within the town of Porac. Two sites, both formerly sugar plantations, were found a few kilometers southeast of the hacienda by Herman Costenoble in 1941. Upon examination, both sites were categorized as of early Porcelain-Age sites, yielding almost similar artifacts to those discovered in the hacienda.

Another interesting site was found near the hacienda, in one of the agricultural fields of Porac. Archaeologists found a slightly trapezoidal remnant of a tool (a chisel, specifically) which was thought to be associated with the artifacts found in the nearby site. However, upon analysis, the artifact was dated to the Late Neolithic period, making it the first evidence of Neolithic occupation in the province.

In 1947, Dr. Henry Otley Beyer observed that there were different types of porcelain in Hacienda Ramona in Porac, Pampanga. Burial jars and ceramic pieces of different shapes and sizes were seen on the site. The burial jars and ceramic pieces are dated from 9th to 12th centuries A.D. (Late Tang to Middle Sung Dynasty), 13th to 14th centuries A.D. (Late Sung to Yuan Dynasty) and 14th to 15th centuries A.D. (beginning of the Ming Dynasty).

Dr. Robert Bradford Fox in 1960, excavated Balukbuk, Hacienda Dolores in Porac, Pampanga. He found habitation and burial sites. The artifacts found are earthenware sherds, 7 metal implements, 13 metal tools (not considered as grave goods), mortar and pestles, and polished stones. A grave good of 50 pieces of Chinese beads string into a bracelet was also found. The tradeware ceramics found are from China, Thailand, Vietnam, and Malaysia. These ceramics are dated from 13th to 16th centuries CE. From this site, it is observed that the dead are buried near houses and near agricultural lands.

Some people from the National Museum of the Philippines conducted an archaeological impact assessment in 1993. Three more excavations were done during 1999, 2001, and 2002 in the sugarcane plantation of Mr. Nestor Dizon in Sitio Babo Balukbuk. In the 2002 excavation, the archaeologists were able to map the site with the help of the findings from previous excavations. Approximately, 85% of the remains found in Babo Balukbuk were earthenware sherds. Some of the sherds had soot or carbon traces in the outer and inner surface, which implies that they were used for cooking. Several were decorated by carving, combing, incising, impressing and multiple combinations. The most usual design is the incision of lines below the rim or neck area of the pot. Furthermore, Dr. Victor Paz stated that some of the sherds have rice impressions, suggesting that rice was used as a temper.

Only teeth enamel, arm bones and votive elements like bracelets and tradeware were present in the matrix, implying that the site of excavation was a burial site. There was absence of skeletal remains due to the acid content of the matrix, resulting to a complicated grave identification.

Besides the artifacts mentioned above, mortars, spindle whorls, pestles and polished pumice stones were unearthed. In addition, Chinese beads from a bracelet, associated with a bangle and a brown stoneware jarlet, were also obtained. Nuts, plant remains and wood fragments were also obtained through wet flotation method. Animal bones and teeth were also present. Lastly, features such as postholes, hearths, middens and plough marks were recorded.

Recent excavations in Guagua, Pampanga supports the theory of primeval trade with China that was dated back to the 10th century or even earlier, which earlier Porac artifacts stipulated. There were hundreds of artifacts excavated in the Balagtas-Capuno property in Guagua. Among them were small blue beads used for trading and coins that was dated back to the Ching Dynasty. Moreover, Chinese plates and cookware were found by archaeologists in burial sites in Porac and Guagua towns.

=== Candaba ===
The town of Candaba was founded in 1575 from an already established settlement called Candawe. It is one of the oldest communities in pre-Hispanic times, and was settled even before the first Spanish conqueror took control of the town.

A 5,000 year old stone adze uncovered in Candaba, Pampanga (currently in the National Museum) was discovered during the 1930s. This artifact was used as a tool in making canoes or bancas. The affluent accessibility of timber, specifically apalit, lanang, and whatnot, along with skilled labors formed the industry. The adze proves a boatbuilding society and trading economy along the Pampanga River and Manila Bay. Additionally, the territory covers the largest shallow swamp in Luzon.

Presently, fisheries and agriculture remain as the primary livelihood.

=== Lubao ===
Along with Candaba, Lubao is one of the three oldest settlements in Pampanga with advanced culture and civilization in the archipelago. It is believed to have been founded by Malays, and was once governed by a native chief, assisted by the council of elders. The town got its name from “baba” meaning “lowland”.

A test excavation was conducted in Porac-Gumain River restored the paleo-shoreline at the Lim Property Site in Purok Israel II, Barangay Remedios, Lubao, Pampanga. It uncovered the earliest directly dated human occupation, about 700–600 years B.P., in the archaeological records. The occupation was dated using radiocarbon dates from samples in one of the excavation layers.

The materials that were excavated and recorded were composed of 223 earthenware sherds, 4 celadon sherds, 29 blue and white porcelain sherds, an undefined porcelain sherds, 5 black glazed stoneware sherds, a metal tool fragment, a worked Bovid bone, several worked fragments of Sus bone, and at least one small (about 10mm long) charred wood fragment.

Apart from this, the only other records in Lubao was a survey that disclosed a late Chinese tradeware. As a matter of fact, the 2005 excavation marks the first settlement that was excavated in the area.

== See also ==
- Pampanga
- Kapampangan people
- Archaeology of Porac, Pampanga

== See also ==
- Impact Assessment Project in Pampanga and Tarlac, by Bautista, A., Santiago, J., & Dizon, Ph.D., E.
- Center for Kapampangan Studies, at https://fabulouslawyer.wordpress.com/2008/08/25/center-for-kapampangan-studies/
