= The Flashman Papers =

Series of novels and stories by George MacDonald Fraser

The Flashman Papers is a series of novels and short stories written by George MacDonald Fraser, the first of which was published in 1969. The books centre on the exploits of the fictional protagonist Harry Flashman. He is a cowardly British soldier, rake and cad who is placed in a series of real historical incidents between 1839 and 1894. While the incidents and much of the detail in the novels have a factual background, Flashman's actions in the stories either are entirely fictional or are real, historical actions that are fictionally attributed to him. Flashman is a character in the 1857 novel by Thomas Hughes, Tom Brown's School Days; Hughes' version of the character is a bully at Rugby School who is expelled for drunkenness. The character was then developed by Fraser and appeared in the 1969 novel Flashman. Fraser went on to write eleven novels and one collection of short stories featuring the character.

During the course of Fraser's novels, Flashman goes from his expulsion from school into the army. Although he is a coward who tries to run away from any danger, he is involved in many famous military episodes from the 19th century, often taking actions that cause or affect events, such as his flatulence affecting the Charge of the Light Brigade, (Note: As a result of drinking inferior champagne after recovering from dysentery, Flashman suffers from flatulence. The noise of his eruptions startles his horse to such an extent it bolts towards the Russian lines, speeding up the British advance.) or being the person who probably shot George Armstrong Custer. When circumstances run against him and he is forced to fight, he often does so relatively capably. Despite his cowardice and his attempts to flee, he becomes a decorated war hero and rises to the rank of brigadier-general. He also meets people who either were notable at the time—such as Benjamin Disraeli and the Duke of Wellington—or became well known after Flashman met them—such as Abraham Lincoln. Flashman either has or tries to have sex with most of the female characters. By the end of the ninth book he estimates that he has had sex with 480 women.

The publication sequence of the books differs from the fictional chronology, with the time frame of some books overlapping. One of the novels, Flashman and the Redskins, is in two parts, the first takes place in 1849–1850 and the second covers 1875–1876. Although the main series of stories finishes in 1894, Flashman lives on until 1915 and appears in his late 80s in another Fraser novel, Mr American.

== Context ==
The great mass of manuscript known as the Flashman papers was discovered during a sale of household furniture ... The papers, which had apparently lain untouched for fifty years, in a tea chest ... were carefully wrapped in oilskin covers.

— Explanatory note, Flashman

The series consists of twelve historical fiction books written by the journalist, author and screenwriter George MacDonald Fraser, that were published between 1969 and 2005. The series consists of eleven novels and one collection of short stories, spanning from 1839 to 1894; they are the memoirs of the fictional character General Sir Harry Paget Flashman, VC, KCB, KCIE. Although Flashman is fictional, the settings and history of the events, and the people with whom he interacts are all largely based around historical events and individuals, although three contain elements of other novels. (Note: Royal Flash took elements from Anthony Hope's 1894 novel The Prisoner of Zenda in what The Guardian described as "a double literary conceit"; Flash for Freedom ends with Flashman and a slave girl avoiding their pursuers by escaping over a frozen river, an event Flashman claims was later used in Harriet Beecher Stowe's 1852 novel Uncle Tom's Cabin; and the short story "Flashman and the Tiger", from the book of the same name, intertwines a Flashman story into the Sherlock Holmes story "The Adventure of the Empty House".) Flashman first appeared in the 1857 semi-autobiographical novel Tom Brown's School Days by Thomas Hughes as a bully at Rugby School, who persecutes Tom Brown, and who is expelled for drunkenness: Fraser's series of novels starts with Flashman's expulsion from school. Based on a literary conceit, an explanatory note—itself also fictional—at the start of Flashman sets the context and explains that the memoirs had been found in an auction house in Ashby, Leicestershire, and had subsequently come into the possession of Fraser, who has acted in the role of editor. Fraser also included pages of notes and appendices at the end of each volume, providing the factual background for Flashman's endeavours.

Fraser was working as a journalist on The Glasgow Herald when he wrote the first novel, Flashman; writing in the evenings, after work, he took 90 hours in total to write the story. After the book was published, he left journalism and took up writing novels. When a break from writing was forced upon him by a broken arm, he abandoned the book until his wife read the manuscript and urged him to finish. He did not find a publisher for the novel for two years, until Barrie & Jenkins published it in 1969. When the novel was published in the US the same year, of the 34 reviews read by Alden Whitman of The New York Times, ten of them considered the book to be a genuine autobiography. Fraser researched each novel at Trinity College Dublin. From their first publication, the books were a commercial success, and new editions appeared on the best-sellers' lists.

== Flashman ==
FLASHMAN, Harry Paget, brigadier-general, V.C., K.C.B., K.C.I.E.: Chevalier, Legion of Honour; Order of Maria Theresa, Austria; Order of the Elephant, Denmark (temporary); US Medal of Honor; San Serafino Order of Purity and Truth, 4th class

— Biographical note, Flashman on the March

Flashman is from a semi-aristocratic background; he recounted that his great-grandfather "made a fortune in America out of slaves and rum, and piracy, too, I shouldn't wonder". His father was "a dissolute former MP, living beyond the bounds of respectable society, and ... his mother [was] born of the self-promoting Paget family". Despite joining the army after expulsion from school, Flashman is a self-confessed coward with a false reputation for bravery, earned at the expense of others, and despite him trying to avoid danger at all costs. He is also "a scoundrel, a drunk, a liar, a cheat [and] a braggart", who was described by Fraser as "an unrepentant old cad" whose only positive features are "humour and shameless honesty as a memorialist".

Flashman is 6 feet 2 inches (1.88 m) tall, weighs 13 stone (180 lb; 83 kg) (12½ stone in the first book, fourteen stone in the last), has broad shoulders and is attractive to women. (Note: In the first novel, Flashman describes himself as six feet tall and weighing 12 and a half stone: in Flashman and the Angel of the Lord he says he is six feet, two inches tall.) He was forced into marriage in the first book, after he "caddishly deflowered" Elspeth Morrison, the daughter of a wealthy Scottish textile manufacturer with whom he had been billeted. Despite being married—and the fact he deeply loves his wife—Flashman is "a compulsive womaniser" who has bedded 480 women by the tenth book in the series, which was set in 1859. Elspeth is also probably unfaithful to him on several occasions. Flashman notes that he has three "prime talents, for horses, languages, and fornication"; he was also described by the master-at-arms of the 11th Hussars as a strong swordsman and was skilled with a lance, particularly at tent pegging. When it is necessary for him to control his fear, he will perform bravely, although is more adept at saving his own skin at the expense of others.

In the course of the series, Flashman is promoted to the rank of brigadier-general, and decorated numerous times by different countries. While the books cover some of the awards—such as being given the Victoria Cross for his actions during the sieges of Cawnpore and Lucknow—some stories are not known, such as how and why he served on both sides of the American Civil War and how he won the Medal of Honor. (Note: Fraser had no intention of describing Flashman's role in the American Civil War. In a 2002 interview he said, "to me, the American Civil War is a colossal bore. It was a rotten war, it's been done to death and I'm not terribly interested. An American wrote to me urging me to write it, saying it had to be the high point of Flashman's career. I wrote back saying: 'Son, it's a foreign sideshow. The Crimea, the Indian Mutiny, these were the important things in Flashman's life. Your civil war? He was so disinterested that he fought on both sides'.")

During his travels Flashman meets people who took part in 19th-century events, including Queen Victoria, Abraham Lincoln, Otto von Bismarck, Oscar Wilde and Florence Nightingale, and he is involved as a participant in some of the century's most notable events, including the Indian Rebellion, the Taiping Rebellion, the charge of the Light Brigade, the Siege of Khartoum, John Brown's raid on Harpers Ferry and the Battle of the Little Bighorn.

Flashman died in 1915, although the details are unknown.

== Publication sequence ==
Books by publication sequence
Title and time	Publisher	Date	Length (first edition)	Plot	Ref.
Flashman (1839–1842)	Herbert Jenkins	1969	256 pp	Flashman's expulsion from Rugby School for drunkenness leads him to join the British Army. He joins the 11th Regiment of Light Dragoons commanded by Lord Cardigan. After an affair with a fellow-officer's lover, he fights a duel, but cheats. He is posted to Scotland because of the affair, and is billeted with the Morrison family; he takes advantage of one of the daughters, Elspeth. After a forced marriage, Flashman is required to resign his position in the Hussars and instead is gazetted into a position with the East India Company. After revealing his language and riding skills, Flashman is assigned to Afghanistan, where he is present at the retreat from Kabul, the last stand at Gandamak and the Siege of Jalalabad.	
Royal Flash (1842–1843 and 1847–1848)	Barrie & Jenkins	1970	256 pp	Fleeing from a police raid on a brothel he was visiting, Flashman meets Lola Montez and Otto von Bismarck. Some years later Flashman is tempted to Munich, where Bismarck has him abducted; he is blackmailed into imitating Prince Carl Gustaf, a fictional member of the Danish royal family. Gustaf is to be married to Duchess Irma, the ruler of the fictional Duchy of Strackenz; according to Bismarck the prince has contracted a sexually transmitted disease, which would be embarrassing if uncovered by his future wife. This turns out to be a lie and the prince has been imprisoned in Jotunberg Castle. Flashman is a doppelgänger of the Prince and is trained to take his place until the Prince is cured. Flashman is accompanied to Strackenz by Bismarck's accomplices, Rudi von Starnberg, Detchard and de Gautet, and is married to the Duchess. Shortly afterwards, while out hunting, Flashman finds out that Bismarck meant to double-cross him and kill him, but he turns the tables on his attacker and tortures the information out of him and kills him instead. He is then captured by Strackenzian nationalists and forced to help them storm the Jotunberg Castle. They are successful, but Flashman and von Starnberg fight in the dungeon, with Flashman narrowly escaping death before escaping back to England, with the help of Montez, who robs him along the way.	
Flash for Freedom! (1848–1849)	Barrie & Jenkins	1971	272 pp	Flashman is falsely accused of cheating at cards, and runs away from disgrace by accepting an offer of a berth on the slaving ship part owned by his father-in-law; the ship is captained by John Charity Spring, an ex-fellow of Oriel College, Oxford who quotes Latin and Greek at length. After sailing to Dahomey, Spring buys slaves from King Ghezo; the deal goes wrong and the crew are attacked by Gezo's Amazons, resulting in the mortal wounding of the third mate, Mr Comber. Comber dies, but admits to Flashman that he is a spy for the navy, giving Flashman his papers to prove his identity. The ship makes its way to America but is captured by the United States Navy. Flashman assumes the identity of Comber and escapes, hiding in the brothel of Susie Willinck. He is abducted by the Underground Railroad and forced to assist in transporting a slave to freedom in Canada. He is accused of being an abolitionist and escapes, ending up employed as a slave driver on a plantation. Caught having sex with the owner's wife, he is himself sold into slavery, but escapes with a slave, before being assisted to freedom by junior congressman Abraham Lincoln. He returns to New Orleans and demands passage to Britain from Spring.	
Flashman at the Charge (1854–1855)	Barrie & Jenkins	1973	286 pp	Flashman is ordered to protect and mentor William of Celle—a (fictional) cousin of Queen Victoria—during the Crimean War; William is killed. Flashman is subsequently involved in The Thin Red Line, the charge of the Heavy Brigade and the charge of the Light Brigade, where he surrenders. He is taken into Russia and placed in the custody of Count Pencherjevsky; he also meets his old schoolfellow Scud East and Count Nicholas Pavlovich Ignatiev, a vicious Russian army captain. After overhearing plans for the Russian invasion of British India, Flashman and East escape, but Flashman is recaptured. He is taken by Ignatiev across central Asia as part of his plans to conquer India, but is subsequently rescued from prison by cohorts of Yaqub Beg. Tajik and Uzbek warriors attack and destroy the Russian fleet with the aid of Flashman, who had been drugged with hashish.	
Flashman in the Great Game (1856–1858)	Barrie & Jenkins	1975	336 pp	Flashman is at Balmoral Castle as a guest of Queen Victoria; he meets Lord Palmerston, who recruits him to go to Jhansi in India and investigate rumours of a rebellion among the Sepoys. Flashman again encounters Nicholas Pavlovich Ignatiev, and the Russian tries to kill him while hunting. Once in Jhansi he meets the queen, Rani Lakshmibai. He listens to her grievances against the British Raj and attempts to seduce her. Shortly afterwards he is nearly garroted by Thuggees and assumes the disguise of Makarram Khan, a Hasanzai of the Black Mountain, and takes refuge in the native cavalry at Meerut. While there, the Sepoy Mutiny begins. Flashman survives the Siege of Cawnpore and the Siege of Lucknow but ends up imprisoned in Gwalior after an attempt to deliver Lakshmi into British hands. He is released just in time to witness her death in battle. In the aftermath Flashman is awarded the Victoria Cross and is knighted; he is also given a copy of the recently published Tom Brown's School Days, which describes him being a bully and a coward while at school.	
Flashman's Lady (1842–1845)	Barrie & Jenkins	1977	328 pp	Flashman meets Tom Brown, a former acquaintance from Rugby School, and agrees to play cricket at Lord's Cricket Ground for a team made up of Old Rugbeians. Following separate threats from a bookmaker and a Duke, Flashman accompanies Don Solomon Haslam—a businessman from the East Indies—Elspeth and his father-in-law on a trip to Singapore. Once there, Haslam reveals himself to be the pirate Sulieman Usman, and he kidnaps Elspeth. Flashman reluctantly gives chase in the company of James Brooke to rescue her, but is himself captured by Usman. He escapes from Usman's ship at Madagascar, but is captured and enslaved by the Malagasy, eventually becoming military advisor and lover to Queen Ranavalona I. He and his wife finally escape from the island during an Anglo-French naval attack.	
Flashman and the Redskins (1849–1850 and 1875–1876)	William Collins, Sons	1982	512 pp	The story immediately follows the end of Flash for Freedom! Part one In his haste to leave New Orleans and avoid arrest, Flashman agrees to accompany Susie Willinck and her company of prostitutes westwards on the California Gold Rush; Willinck forces him into marriage before the journey. Despite being attacked by a band of Comanche on the journey, they reach Santa Fe, New Mexico, where Flashman absconds with $2,000 made from selling one of the prostitutes, Cleonie, to Navajos. Flashman falls in with a group of travellers but he discovers them to be scalp-hunters, when they attack a band of Apaches. Flashman joins in but refuses to take any scalps or rape captive women, and when the scalp-hunters are attacked by the remainder of the tribe, he is saved and marries Sonsee-Array, the daughter of chief, Mangas Coloradas. He eventually escapes and is saved by Kit Carson on the Jornada del Muerto. Part two In 1875 Flashman returns to America with his wife, Elspeth. Later, in Washington DC, he meets George Armstrong Custer and Mrs. Arthur B. Candy, and travels to Bismarck, North Dakota, with Mrs. Candy to pursue a carnal relationship. She reveals herself to be the former slave Cleonie, and he is kidnapped by Sioux and kept captive at Greasy Grass. He escapes just in time to take part in the Battle of the Little Bighorn, where he sees the defeat and death of Custer—possibly being the one who kills him. Flashman is captured, partly scalped and hidden by Frank Grouard, who reveals himself to be his illegitimate son from Cleonie. Grouard breaks a promise to his mother and decides not to kill Flashman, but instead takes him back to Deadwood, Dakota Territory.	
Flashman and the Dragon (1860)	William Collins, Sons	1985	352 pp	While in Hong Kong, Flashman is reluctantly persuaded by an English vicar's wife to escort a shipment of opium into Canton; en route he discovers that instead of opium he is carrying guns to the Taiping rebels. He is subsequently put onto the British embassy intelligence staff in Shanghai. He then travels to the mouth of the Peiho to join Lord Elgin's staff for his march to Peking. During the course of the march he is captured by Qing imperial troops and becomes the prisoner and lover of Yehonala, the imperial concubine. He is finally freed when the British army arrives at Peking; he then witnesses the destruction of the imperial Summer Palace.	
Flashman and the Mountain of Light (1845–1846)	William Collins, Sons	1990	332 pp	Flashman is in India, and is dispatched by Major George Broadfoot to the Punjab, masquerading as a solicitor attempting to settle the Soochet legacy with Maharani Jind Kaur. After becoming entangled in the intrigues of the Punjabi court, Flashman is forced to flee at the outbreak of the First Sikh War, but becomes involved in plans by the Punjabi nobility to curb the power of the Khalsa. Returning to the relative safety of the British forces, Flashman arrives just in time to become an unwilling participant in the attack on Ferozepore. Injured, he attempts to avoid the rest of the war in a sick bed, but is called on by Jind Kaur to smuggle her son Duleep Singh and the Koh-i-Noor diamond out of the country.	
Flashman and the Angel of the Lord (1858–1859)	HarperCollins	1994	400 pp	While in South Africa Flashman has a chance meeting with John Charity Spring. Spring drugs Flashman and ships him to the US, where charges are still outstanding against him. Flashman avoids the authorities, but is found by Crixus, a leader of the Underground Railroad, who blackmails him into joining John Brown and taking part in his raid on Harpers Ferry. He is accompanied by one of Crixus' followers, a black man named Joe Simmons, who actually works for the Kuklos, a forerunner of the Ku Klux Klan. The Kuklos also want Flashman to help Brown, but in order to start a civil war. The wife of the leader of the Kuklos works for Allan Pinkerton, who also wants Flashman to join with Brown, but to slow him down and prevent the raid into the South from ever happening. Despite Flashman's attempts, the raid goes ahead and he is caught in the arsenal when the US Marines attack.	
Flashman and the Tiger (1878–1894)	HarperCollins	1999	352 pp	"The Road to Charing Cross"— Flashman goes to Berlin with Henri Blowitz to help get a copy of the Treaty of Berlin and publish it in The Times. Five years later, he is trying to avoid being sent to Sudan with Charles George Gordon when a letter from Blowitz arrives inviting him to Paris. He rides the maiden journey of the Orient Express and is blackmailed by Bismarck into joining Rupert Willem von Starnberg (the son of the villain from Royal Flash). Flashman and Starnberg are instructed by Bismarck to save Emperor Franz Josef from assassination by Magyar nationalists, but Flashman is in turn tricked by Starnberg, who is one of the assassins. "The Subtleties of Baccarat"—Flashman is an observer of the Tranby Croft affair, which he discovers was caused by his wife. "Flashman and the Tiger"—Flashman meets "Tiger Jack" Moran in the aftermath of the Battle of Isandlwana; the pair escape to Rorke's Drift. Years later Moran reveals he was the cabin boy on Captain John Charity Spring's ship, the Balliol College (see Flash for Freedom!); he has been seeking revenge against the ship's crew and was blackmailing Flashman's granddaughter in order to sleep with her. While trying to kill him, Flashman is mistaken for a tramp by Sherlock Holmes, while the police arrest Moran for trying to kill Holmes (see "The Adventure of the Empty House").	
Flashman on the March (1867–1868)	HarperCollins	2005	320 pp	While in Trieste, Flashman meets an old school friend, Jack Speedicut, who enlists him to escort a shipment of Maria Theresa thalers to General Robert Napier. Napier is based in Abyssinia, on a military expedition against King Tewodros II. On Flashman's arrival in Abyssinia, Napier enlists him and despatches him on a secret undercover mission to recruit Queen Masteeat and her Galla people, who are opposed to Tewodros. Flashman succeeds in enlisting the assistance of Queen Masteeat, but is then captured by Tewodros' forces. Flashman is held captive while Napier's forces advance and then storm the capital Magdala—now Amba Mariam—and is present when the king commits suicide.	

== Fictional chronology ==
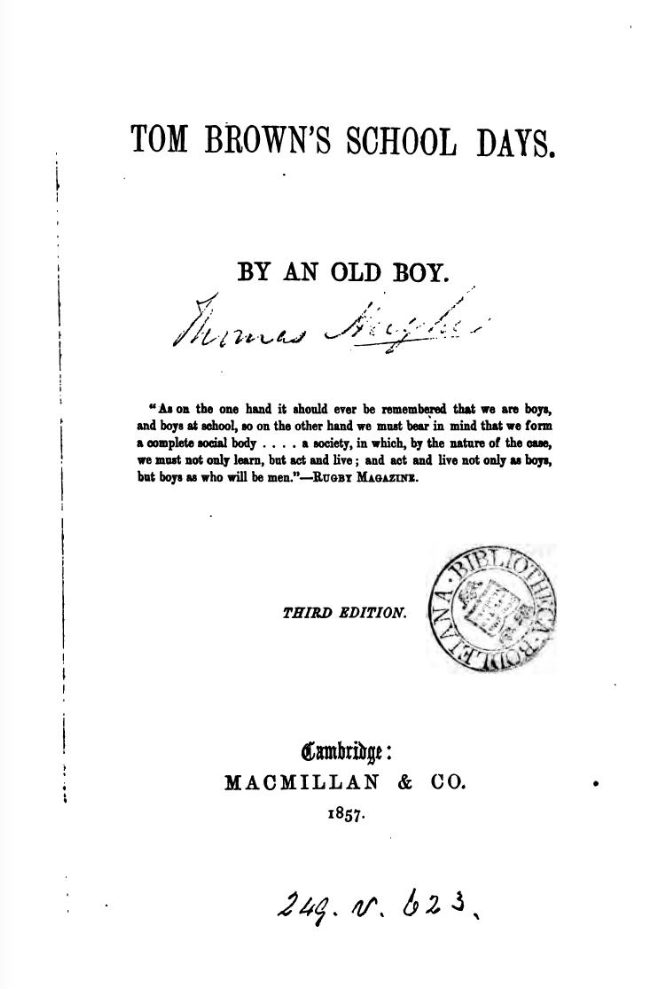
Title page of Thomas Hughes's 1857 novel Tom Brown's School Days, the origin of the Flashman character

Flashman's fictional chronology
Title	Years covered	Publication order	Locations	Ref.
Flashman	1839–1842	1	Britain, India and Afghanistan	
Royal Flash	1842–1843	2	Britain, Germany and Denmark	
Flashman's Lady	1842–1845	6	Britain, Borneo and Madagascar	
Flashman and the Mountain of Light	1845–1846	9	Indian Punjab	
Royal Flash	1847–1848	2	Germany and Denmark	
Flash for Freedom!	1848–1849	3	Britain, West Africa and the USA	
Flashman and the Redskins	1849–1850	7	USA	
Flashman at the Charge	1854–1855	4	Britain, Crimea and Central Asia	
Flashman in the Great Game	1856–1858	5	Britain and India	
Flashman and the Angel of the Lord	1858–1859	10	India, South Africa and the USA	
Flashman and the Dragon	1860	8	China	
Flashman on the March	1867–1868	12	Mexico, Abyssinia	
Flashman and the Redskins	1875–1876	7	USA	
"The Road to Charing Cross"	1878	11	Berlin	
"Flashman and the Tiger"	1879	11	Africa	
"The Road to Charing Cross"	1883–1884	11	Europe	
"The Subtleties of Baccarat"	1890 & 1891	11	Britain	
"Flashman and the Tiger"	1894	11	Britain	

== Other references ==
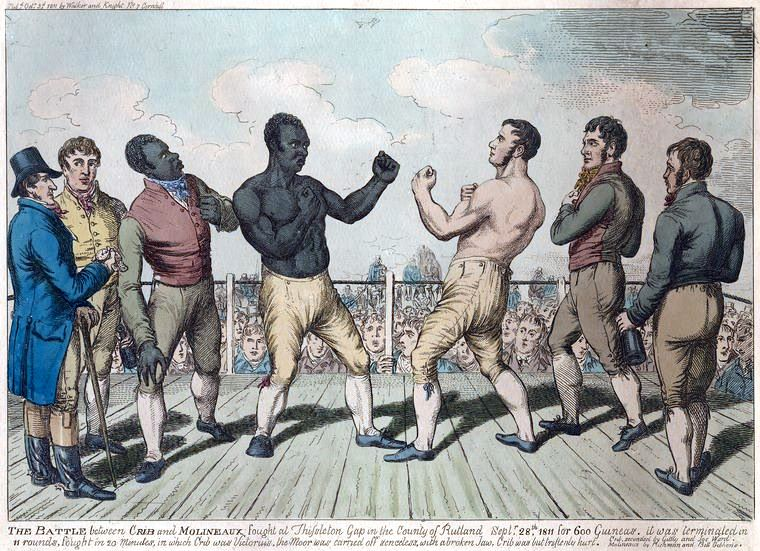
Tom Molineaux—Black Ajax—(fourth from the left) was financially backed by Flashman's father.

Flashman also appears in another book by Fraser, Mr American, aged 88, while his father was one of the financial backers of the bare-knuckle boxer Tom Molineaux in Black Ajax.

== Notes and references ==
=== Bibliography ===
- Allen, Bruce (1 September 1998). "Black Ajax". The World and I. 13 (N9). News World Communications: 278. ISSN 0887-9346.
- Fraser, George MacDonald (1974). Flashman. London: Pan Books. ISBN 978-0-330-02484-6.
- Fraser, George MacDonald (1991). Flashman and the Mountain of Light. London: HarperCollins. ISBN 978-0-00-617980-1.
- Fraser, George MacDonald (1993a). Royal Flash. London: HarperCollins. ISBN 978-0-00-617678-7.
- Fraser, George MacDonald (1993b). Flashman's Lady. London: HarperCollins. ISBN 978-0-00-617678-7.
- Fraser, George MacDonald (1993c). Flashman and the Redskins. London: HarperCollins. ISBN 978-0-00-617801-9.
- Fraser, George MacDonald (1993d). Mr. American. London: HarperCollins. ISBN 978-0-00-271235-4.
- Fraser, George MacDonald (1994a). Flash for Freedom!. London: HarperCollins. ISBN 978-0-00-617679-4.
- Fraser, George MacDonald (1994b). Flashman and the Dragon. London: HarperCollins. ISBN 978-0-00-617340-3.
- Fraser, George MacDonald (1995). Flashman and the Angel of the Lord. London: HarperCollins. ISBN 978-0-00-649023-4.
- Fraser, George MacDonald (1996a). Flashman at the Charge. London: HarperCollins. ISBN 978-0-00-617676-3.
- Fraser, George MacDonald (1996b). Flashman in the Great Game. London: HarperCollins. ISBN 978-0-00-617677-0.
- Fraser, George MacDonald (2000). Flashman and the Tiger. London: HarperCollins. ISBN 978-0-00-651367-4.
- Fraser, George MacDonald (2005). Flashman on the March. London: HarperCollins. ISBN 978-0-00-719740-8.
- Hitchens, Christopher (March 2006). "Scoundrel Time; Part James Bond, part Bertie Wooster, Flashman has whored, drunk, and weaseled his way through 12 adventures set in British imperial times". Vanity Fair (547). Condé Nast Publications.
- Krueger, Christine L. (2009). Encyclopedia of British Writers, 19th Century. New York: Infobase Publishing. ISBN 978-1-4381-0870-4.
- Ramsay, Allan (June 2003). "Flashman and the Victorian Social Conscience". The Contemporary Review. 282 (1649). Contemporary Review Company Ltd.
