= George Hughes (cricketer) =

English cricketer and educator

Personal information
- Full name: George Edward Hughes
- Born: 18 September 1821; Uffington, Berkshire, England
- Died: 2 May 1872 (aged 50); Hoylake, Cheshire, England
- Batting: Unknown
- Relatives: Thomas Hughes (brother)

Domestic team information
- Years: Team
- 1845: Oxford University

Career statistics
Competition	First-class
Matches	1
Runs scored	12
Batting average	6.00
100s/50s	–/–
Top score	12
Catches/stumpings	–/–
- Source: Cricinfo, 14 May 2020

George Edward Hughes (18 September 1821 – 2 May 1872) was an English first-class cricketer and barrister.

The son of the author John Hughes, he was born in September 1821 at Uffington, Berkshire. He was educated at Rugby School, before going up to Oriel College, Oxford. While studying at Oxford, he made a single appearance in first-class cricket for Oxford University against Cambridge University at Lord's in The University Match of 1845. Batting twice in the match, he was dismissed for 12 runs in the Oxford first innings by Stephen Rippingall, while in their second innings he was dismissed by the same bowler without scoring.

A student of Lincoln's Inn, he was called to the bar in 1848 and completed his Doctor of Canon Law in 1850, with Hughes practicing as a barrister in the ecclesiastical courts. His brother, Thomas Hughes, wrote the book Tom Brown's School Days in 1857, and likely based the main character Tom Brown on Hughes during his time at Rugby and later Oxford in the sequel novel Tom Brown at Oxford, though the clergyman Augustus Orlebar could also have been the basis for the character. He married Anne Salusbury Steward, with the couple having four children. Hughes died at Hoylake in May 1872 from inflammation of the lungs.
