= Augustus Orlebar (cricketer) =

English cricketer

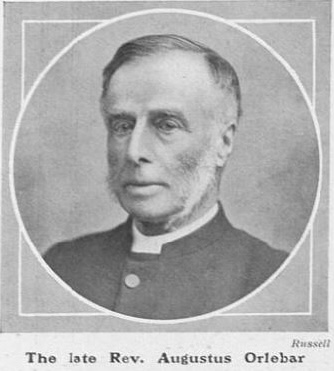

Personal information
- Full name: Augustus Orlebar
- Born: 14 June 1824; Husborne Crawley, Bedfordshire, England
- Died: 30 September 1912 (aged 88); Willington, Bedfordshire, England
- Batting: Unknown

Domestic team information
- Years: Team
- 1845: Oxford University

Career statistics
Competition	First-class
Matches	1
Runs scored	1
Batting average	0.50
100s/50s	–/–
Top score	1
Catches/stumpings	–/–
- Source: Cricinfo, 6 July 2020

Augustus Orlebar (14 June 1824 – 30 September 1912) was an English first-class cricketer and clergyman.

The son of Robert Charles Orlebar, he was born in June 1824 at Husborne Crawley, Bedfordshire. He was educated at Rugby School, where he is considered to have been a candidate for the basis of the character Tom Brown in Thomas Hughes' Tom Brown's School Days, though Hughes' brother, George, seems a more plausible candidate. From Rugby, Orlebar went up to Wadham College, Oxford. While studying at Oxford, he made a single appearance in first-class cricket for Oxford University against the Marylebone Cricket Club at Oxford in 1845. Batting twice in the match, he was dismissed in the Oxford first innings for a single run by William Lillywhite, while in their second innings he was dismissed without scoring by the same bowler.

After graduating from Oxford, Orlebar took holy orders in the Church of England. He was appointed rector of Farndish in Bedfordshire from 1852 to 1858, before serving as vicar of Willington from 1858 until his death there in September 1912. His grandson, also called Augustus, was an air vice-marshal in the Royal Air Force.
