= Kapampangan people =

Austronesian ethnic group of the Philippines

Kapampangan people Taung Kapampangan
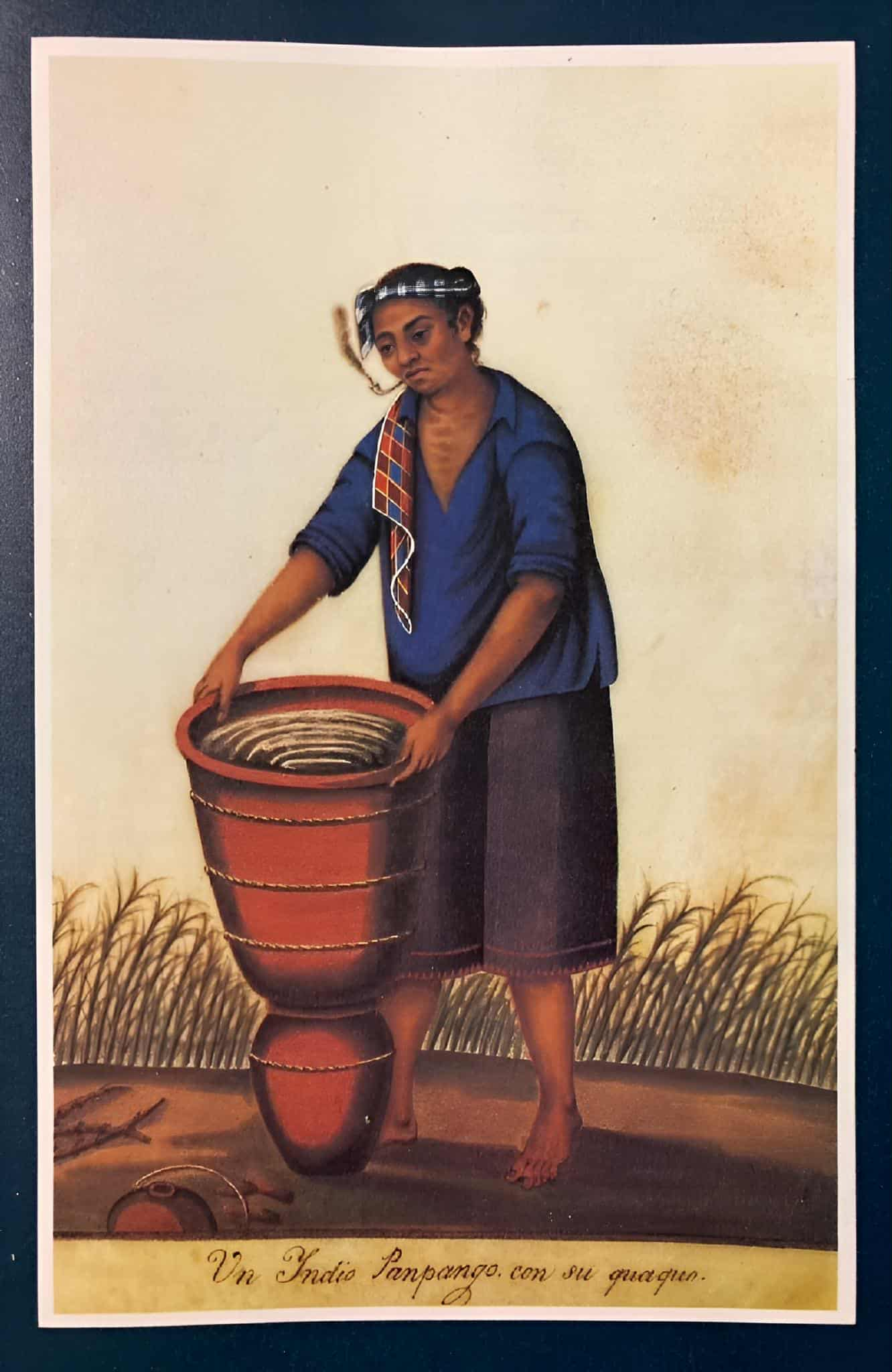
- Kapampangan native by Filipino painter Damian Domingo circa 1800's

Total population
- 3,209,738 (2020 census) (3% of the Philippine population)

Regions with significant populations
- Philippines (Central Luzon, Metro Manila) United States Canada Worldwide

Languages
- Kapampangan, Tagalog, English

Religion
- Predominantly Roman Catholicism, minority Protestantism (including Iglesia ni Cristo), Buddhism and Animism (Ariya)

Related ethnic groups
- Pangasinan, Sambal, Tagalog, Ilocano, Bicolano, other Filipino ethnic groups, Austronesian peoples

The Kapampangan people (Kapampangan: Taung Kapampangan), Pampangueños or Pampangos, are the sixth largest ethnolinguistic group in the Philippines, numbering about 2,784,526 in 2010. They live mainly in the provinces of Pampanga, Bataan and Tarlac, as well as Bulacan, Nueva Ecija and Zambales.

== Distribution ==
The Kapampangans are shown in lavender in this map.

The province of Pampanga is the traditional homeland of the Kapampangans. Once occupying a vast stretch of land that extended from Tondo to the rest of Central Luzon, huge chunks of territories were carved out of Pampanga so as to create the provinces of Bulacan, Bataan, Nueva Ecija, Aurora and Tarlac; Pampanga also included Novaliches and Valenzuela, which was formerly known as Polo, then towns in Bulacan and now included in Metro Manila. As a result, Kapampangans now populate a region that extends beyond the political boundaries of the small province of Pampanga. In the province of Tarlac, the indigenous population of Tarlac City and the municipalities of Bamban, Capas and Concepcion are Kapampangans, while the municipalities of Victoria, La Paz, have a significant Kapampangan population.

In Bataan, Kapampangans populate the municipalities of Dinalupihan and Hermosa, and the barangays of Mabatang in Abucay and Calaguiman in Samal. Kapampangans can be found scattered all across the southern barrios of Cabiao and the municipalities of San Antonio, San Isidro, Gapan and Cabanatuan in the province of Nueva Ecija and in the western section of the province of Bulacan. Kapampangan enclaves still exist in Tondo and other parts of the National Capital Region. Kapampangans have also migrated to Mindoro, Palawan and Mindanao and have formed strong Kapampangan organizations called aguman in Cagayan de Oro, Davao City and General Santos. Kapampangans also settled Ilocos Region and Cagayan Valley, with largest concentrations in Pangasinan, Cagayan, and Isabela.

== Languages ==
Kapampangans speak the Kapampangan language, which belongs to Central Luzon languages of Malayo-Polynesian languages. They even speak other languages within the environment of other ethnic groups in areas they settled and grew up in, like Sambal, Pangasinan, Ilocano, and Tagalog (all in Central Luzon).

Kapampangan settlers in Mindanao can also speak Cebuano, Hiligaynon as well as Tagalog and various indigenous Mindanaoan languages in addition to their native language but their descendants (especially newer generations born in Mindanao) only speak Cebuano, Hiligaynon, Tagalog and various indigenous Mindanaoan languages with varying fluency in Kapampangan or none at all.

== History ==
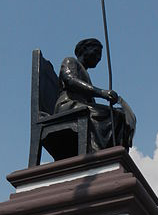
Tarik Sulayman, a prominent Kapampangan leader from Macabebe who fought against the Spanish in the Battle of Bangkusay Channel in June 1571.

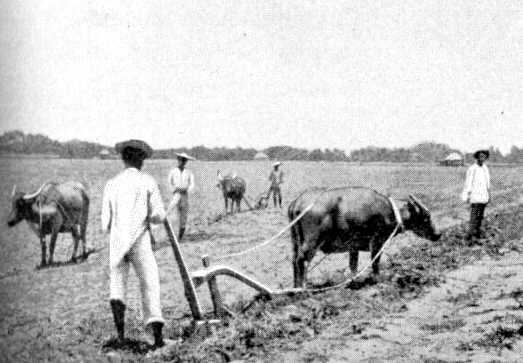
Kapampangan farmers plowing with oxen, c. 1900.

The oldest artifact ever found in the province of Pampanga is a 5000-year-old stone adze found in Candaba. It is said to be a tool used in building boats. Earthenware and tradeware dating back to 1500 BC have also been found in Candaba and Porac. Farming and fishing were the main industries of the Kapampangan people.

Kapampangans, along with Sambal people and the Sinauna (lit. "those from the beginning"), originated in southern Luzon, where they made contact with the migrating Tagalog settlers, of which contact between the Kapampangans and Tagalogs was most intensive. After this, the original settlers moved northward: Kapampangans moved to modern Tondo, Navotas, Bulacan, Nueva Ecija, Aurora, Pampanga, south Tarlac, and east Bataan and Sambals to the modern province of Zambales, in turn, displacing the Aetas. Tagalogs from southern Luzon, most specifically Cavite, migrated to parts of Bataan. Aetas were displaced to the mountain areas by the end of the 16th century. Kapampangans settled Aurora alongside Aetas and Bugkalots.

The growth of the Malacca as the largest Southeast Asian entrepôt in the Maritime Silk Road led to a gradual spread of its cultural influence eastward throughout insular Southeast Asia. Malay became the regional lingua franca of trade and many polities enculturated Islamic Malay customs and governance to varying degrees, including Kapampangans, Tagalogs and other coastal Philippine peoples. According to Bruneian folklore, at around 1500 Sultan Bolkiah launched a successful northward expedition to break Tondo's monopoly as a regional entrepot of the Chinese trade and established Maynila (Selurong?) across the Pasig delta, ruled by his heirs as a satellite. Subsequently, Bruneian influence spread elsewhere around Manila Bay, present-day Batangas, and coastal Mindoro through closer trade and political relations, with a growing overseas Kapampangan-Tagalog population based in Brunei and beyond in Malacca in various professions as traders, sailors, shipbuilders, mercenaries, governors, and slaves.

Kapampangans have played a dynamic yet conflicting role in Philippine history. The Kapampangans of Macabebe, who were formerly Muslim, were the first to defend the Luzon Empire from Spanish domination in 1571. Yet it was the Kapampangans that the Spaniards relied on to defend their new colony from the Dutch. It was at this time that "one Castilian plus three Kapampangans" were considered as "four Castilians" as long they gallantly served in the colonial armed forces. Such behaviour earned them the stereotype of being quislings in exchange for personal wealth and self-aggrandisement all throughout the archipelago. After their successful battle against the Dutch in 1640, only Kapampangans were allowed to study side by side with the Spaniards in exclusive Spanish academies and universities in Manila, by order of Governor-General Sebastián Hurtado de Corcuera. When the province of Bataan was established on January 11, 1757, out of territories belonging to Pampanga and the corregimiento of Mariveles, Tagalogs migrated to east Bataan, where Kapampangans assimilated to the Tagalogs. Kapampangans were displaced to the towns near Pampanga by that time, along with the Aetas.

When the British occupation of Manila happened in 1762, many Tagalog refugees from Manila escaped to Bulacan and to neighboring Nueva Ecija, where the original Kapampangan settlers welcomed them; Bulacan & Nueva Ecija were natively Kapampangan when Spaniards arrived; majority of Kapampangans sold their lands to the newly arrived Tagalog settlers and others intermarried with and assimilated to the Tagalog, which made Bulacan & Nueva Ecija dominantly Tagalog. The same situation happened in modern Aurora, where it was repopulated by settlers from Tagalog and Ilocos regions, with other settlers from Cordillera and Isabela, and married with some Aeta and Bugkalots, this led to the assimilation of Kapampangans to the Tagalog settlers. Kapampangans were the native residents of the northwest areas of Nueva Ecija; Pangasinan settlers moved there during early years of Spanish territorial period until the Kapampangans assimilated to the Pangasinan settlers. In 1896, Kapampangans were one of the principal ethnic groups to push and fuel the Philippine revolution against Spain. Yet it was also the Kapampangans of Macabebe that fiercely defended the last Spanish garrison against the revolutionaries.

With the outbreak of World War II, Japanese planes invaded the main province of Pampanga and attacked the United States Air Base at Clark Field in Angeles, Pampanga on December 8, 1941. Later Japanese soldiers entered the province of Pampanga in 1942 and the Japanese Occupation formally began. Many Kapampangans joined a group of stronghold soldiers that survived the invasion and officially trained under the 31st Infantry Division, Philippine Commonwealth Army. USAFFE was stationed in Pampanga on July 26, 1941, before the surrender by the Japanese to April 9, 1942. After the Battle of Bataan in 1942, some Kapampangan soldiers of the USAFFE 31st Infantry Division fought four years of battles against Japanese troops. After the fall of Bataan on April 9, 1942, many Kapampangan soldiers of the USAFFE 31st Division surrendered to the Japanese and then participated in the Bataan Death March from Mariveles, Bataan, to Capas, Tarlac.

Many Kapampangans joined the guerrilla resistance fighters of the Hukbalahap Communist resistance. Many Kapampangan guerrillas and Hukbalahap communist groups fought for more than three years of insurgency during the Japanese Occupation and also fought side by side with allied forces in the main province of Pampanga, helping local troops of the Philippine Commonwealth Army and incoming Philippine Constabulary 3rd Constabulary Regiments stationed at the general headquarters in Pampanga in operations in Central Luzon from 1942 to 1945 against the Imperial Japanese troops.

== Culture ==
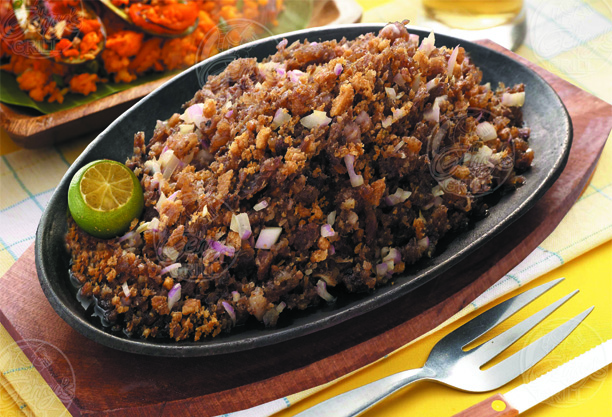
Sisig, a popular Kapampangan dish.

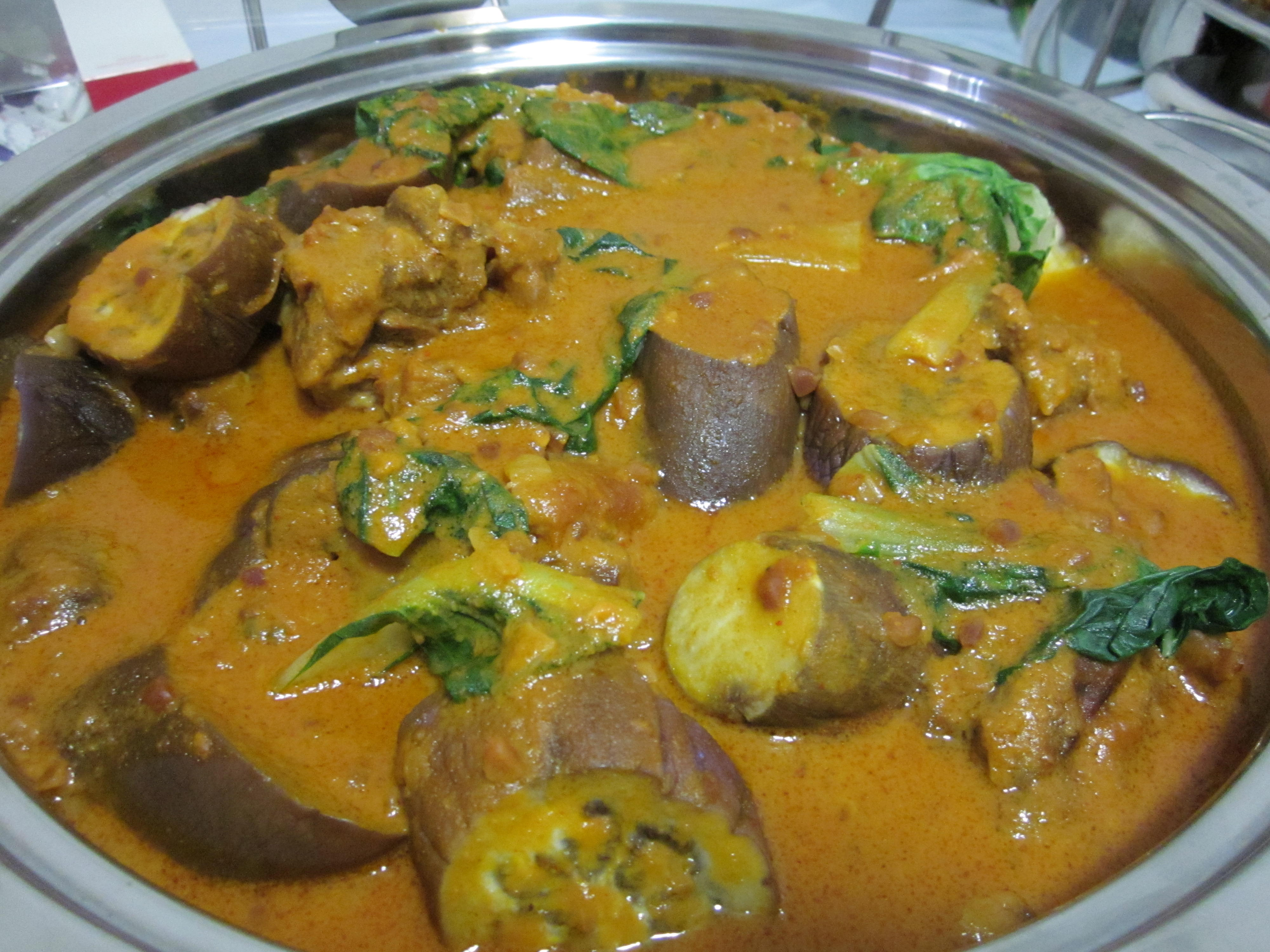
Kare-kare

=== Festivals ===
Many Kapampangan festivals display an indigenous flavor unique only to the Kapampangan people. Consider the Curaldal or "street dancing" that accompanies the Feast of Santa Lucia in Sasmuan or the Aguman Sanduk were men cross-dress as women to welcome the New Year in Minalin or the Batalla Festival to re-enact the battle between the native Muslim Moor and the new colonist Native Capampangan Christians, the historical battle between the two religious native Kapampangans. They start the battle in Ugtung-aldo or afternoon and they end it in Sisilim or sunset with the tune of what Macabebeanons and Masantuleñios called BATTALA Masantol, Macabebe and Lubao.

The Pistang Danum of the barrios of Pansinao, Mandasig, Lanang and Pasig in Candaba, where food is served on floating banana rafts on the waters of the Pampanga River was originally a non-Christian holiday that is now made to coincide with the baptism of Christ. The Kapampangan New Year or Bayung Banwa that welcomes the coming of the monsoons and the start of the planting season is made to coincide with the feast of John the Baptist. The colourful Apung Iru fluvial procession of Apalit, once a thanksgiving celebration in honour of the river, has become the feast of Saint Peter.

The most dramatic festivals can be witnessed during the Mal ay Aldo, which is the Kapampangan expression of the Holy Week. These include the erection of a temporary shrine known as the puni where the pasion or the story of Christ's suffering is chanted in archaic Kapampangan. The melody of the Kapampangan pasion was said to have been taken from their traditional epic, whose original words were lost and replaced by the story of Christ. The highlight of the Mal ay Aldo celebration is the procession of the magdarame or sasalibatbat penitents covered in blood from self-flagellation. Some of them even have themselves crucified every Good Friday at the dried up swamp of barrio Cutud in San Fernando.

=== Cuisine ===
Kapampangan cuisine, or Lutung Kapampangan, has gained a favourable reputation among other Philippine ethnic groups, which hailed Pampanga as the "Culinary Capital of the Philippines". Some popular Kapampangan dishes that have become mainstays across the country include sisig, kare-kare, tocino or pindang and their native version of the longaniza.

Other Kapampangan dishes, which are an acquired taste for the other ethnic groups include buru (fish fermented in rice), betute tugak (stuffed frogs), arobung kamaru (mole crickets sauteed in vinegar and garlic), estofadong barag (spicy stewed monitor lizard), sisig, sigang liempu, dagis a tinama (marinated rats), laman panara, Lutung Kuba ( Sweet Savory Goose, Duck)and bobotu.

=== Religion ===
Kapampangans are mostly Christians, a majority of which are Roman Catholics, Aglipay, Methodists, and the Church of Jesus Christ of Latter-day Saints (LDS Church). A few belong to non-Christian religions. However, traces of native-Austronesian Anitism, Hinduism, and Buddhism can still be found among their folk practices and traditions, as these were the majority beliefs of the Kapampangan before the imposition of Christianity in the 16th century. A few Kapampangans practice Islam, mostly by former Christians (Balik Islam) either by study abroad or contact with Moro migrants from the southern Philippines. By the early 16th century, some Kapampangans (especially merchants) were Muslim due to their links with Bruneian Malays. The old Kapampangan-speaking Kingdom of Tondo was ruled as a Muslim kingdom, Islam was prominent enough in coastal areas of Kapampangan region that Spaniards mistakenly called them "Moros" due to abundance of indications of practicing Muslim faith and their close association with Brunei.

== Prominent Kapampangans ==
The Kapampangans have produced many Rajahs, Datus, four Philippine presidents, three chief justices, a senate president, the first Filipino cardinal, guerrillas and many notable figures in public service, education, religion, diplomacy, journalism, the arts and sciences, entertainment and business.

For a list of prominent or noteworthy Kapampangans, see Category:Kapampangan people.

=== History, politics and religion ===
- Benigno Aquino Sr. – Filipino speaker of the National Assembly of the Second Philippine Republic from 1943 to 1944.
- Ninoy Aquino – Filipino senator whose assassination triggered the events that led to the People Power Revolution. Born and raised in Concepcion, Tarlac
- Corazon Cojuangco Aquino – 11th President of the Philippines.
- Benigno S. Aquino III – the 15th President of Philippines.
- Rey Aquino – a former mayor of San Fernando and the CEO of Philippine Health Insurance.
- Oscar Samson Rodriguez – a former mayor of San Fernando and former Pampanga's 3rd district representative
- Jose B. Lingad – a former Governor of Pampanga and former Pampanga's 1st district representative
- Juan Macapagal – Datu of Arayat, the great-grandson of Lakandula. He was given the title Maestre de Campo General of the natives Arayat, Candaba and Apalit for his aid in suppressing the Kapampangan Revolt of 1660 and was the only native in the Philippines to become an encomendero.
- Diosdado Macapagal – 9th President of Philippines and a native of Lubao, Pampanga.
- Gloria Macapagal Arroyo – 14th President of Philippines and daughter of president Diosdado Macapagal.
- Tarik Sulayman, a precolonial Muslim ruler from Macabebe who battled Spanish forces at the Battle of Bangkusay Channel
- Francisco Tongio Liongson, a politician and doctor, was a native of Bacolor, who became Pampanga's governor and its first senator.
- Pedro Tongio Liongson, lawyer and judge, member of the Malolos Congress (1898–1899) and Judge Advocate General of the army of the First Philippine Republic (1899–1900).
- José Abad Santos – 5th Chief Justice of the Supreme Court of the Philippines.
- Pedro Abad Santos – a doctor, lawyer, Marxist, and politician who later became a leader of the first of two Communist rebellions from the 1930s to the 1950s. He is the older brother of José Abad Santos.
- Felix Manalo – founder of the Christian religious organization Iglesia ni Cristo.
- Eliseo Soriano – evangelist and presiding minister of the Philippine-based Members Church of God International.
- Satur Ocampo – cofounder of the National Democratic Front and representative for the Bayan Muna party in the House of Representatives.
- Luis Taruc – a political figure and Communist revolutionary. He was the leader of the Hukbalahap rebel group between 1942 and 1954.
- Rufino Jiao Santos – the former Archbishop of Manila from 1953 to 1973 and was the first Filipino to be named Cardinal.
- Eddie Panlilio – the first Catholic priest in the Philippines to be elected as a provincial governor.
- Yeng Guiao – a former vice-governor of Pampanga and basketball coach.
- Gil J. Puyat – was the Senate President of the Philippines from 1967 to 1972.
- Rogelio dela Rosa – actor and senator
- Kiko Pangilinan – senator
- Randy David – political analyst, newspaper columnist, and professor at the University of the Philippines in Diliman.
- Honesto Ongtioco – Roman Catholic prelate
- Apollo Quiboloy – televangelist; born in Davao City to Kapampangan parents from Lubao.

=== Arts and culture ===
- Francisco Alonso Liongson – playwright.
- Aurelio Tolentino – nationalist writer.
- Amado Yuzon – Kapampangan Poet Laureate.
- Vicente Manansala – a National Artist of the Philippines in Visual Arts.
- Ambeth Ocampo – historian, academic, journalist and author.
- Zoilo Hilario – a member of the Institute of National Language who dedicated his life to imposing the ABAKADA on Kapampangan writing through the Akademyang Kapampangan, the organization he created.
- Brillante Mendoza – film director.
- Jess Española – animator, layout artist, and assistant director.

=== Popular culture, sports and entertainment ===
- Kara David - journalist
- Dolphy – comedian.
- Vilma Santos – actress and Governor of Batangas.
- Melanie Marquez – actress and beauty queen.
- Dong Puno – television host, media executive, newspaper columnist, and lawyer.
- Efren Reyes – billiards player.
- Francisco Bustamante – billiards player.
- apl.de.ap (Allan Pineda Lindo) – member of The Black Eyed Peas.
- Allen Dizon – actor
- Lito Lapid – actor and politician.
- Joey Marquez – basketball player, actor and politician.
- Ato Agustin – basketball player
- Arwind Santos – basketball player
- Japeth Aguilar – basketball player
- Coco Martin – actor, martial artist, film director and producer
- Calvin Abueva – basketball player
- Jayson Castro – basketball player
- Gary David – basketball player
- JC Intal – basketball player
- Rey Langit – journalist.
- Rudy Fernandez – actor
- Lorna Tolentino – actress
- Jean García – actress
- Carlos Badion – basketball player
- Ed Ocampo – basketball player
- Mark Lapid – actor, film producer, and politician
- Helen Gamboa – actress, singer, and beauty queen
- Rufa Mae Quinto – comedian
- Angel Aquino – fashion model and actress
- Liza Lorena – beauty queen and actress
- Fernando Poe Jr. – actor and politician.
- Sharon Cuneta – actress, TV host, and singer.
- KC Concepcion – actress
- Lea Salonga – singer and actress
- Judy Ann Santos – actress.
- Paquito Diaz – actor and director
- Leah Dizon – model, singer, and TV personality
- Vanessa Minnillo – television personality
- Isabel Preysler – journalist, socialite, and television host.
- Enrique Iglesias – singer-songwriter and actor
- Chábeli Iglesias – socialite
- Julio Iglesias Jr. – singer
- Hilda Koronel – actress
- Lalaine Vergara – actress and singer.
- Francisco "Django" Bustamante – billiards player
- Mikee Cojuangco Jaworski – equestrian and actress.
- Rosa Rosal – actress.
- Chris Tiu – basketball player
- Sarah Geronimo – singer and actress, movie star.
- Ryzza Mae Dizon – actress
- Rosa del Rosario – actress
- Thia Megia – a participant of American Idol Season 10. She is from Angeles City.
- John Prats – actor
- Maricel Laxa – actress
- Luis Manzano – actor
- Bamboo Manalac – singer
- Aljur Abrenica – actor
- Kris Aquino – actress
- Dimples Romana – actress and model.
- Emma Tiglao – Actress, model, journalist, television presenter, and Miss Grand International 2025
- Norman King - first Aeta from Pampanga to graduate from the University of the Philippines Manila

== See also ==
- Kapampangan language
- Pampanga
- Prehistory of Pampanga
  - Archaeology of Porac, Pampanga
- Papanggo
- Sambal people
- Tagalog people
- Ilocano people
- Lowland Christian Filipinos
- Pangasinan people
- Negrito
