= Archaeology of Porac, Pampanga =

Porac, Pampanga, Philippines contains areas in and near Babo Balukbuk that have strong indication of human habitation, according to investigations published on the University of the Philippines Archaeological Studies Program website. Later test excavations found materials dated around the 12th century to the 17th century C.E.

== Archaeological history ==
The site was excavated in 1935–1936 by G.M. Goodall and two Filipino assistants, then from 1959 to 1960 by Robert Fox, followed by an archaeological impact assessment by the National Museum of the Philippines. Three more excavations were in 1999, 2001, and 2002 in a sugar plantation. The excavation site is also called the Dizon-1 site after the plantation's owner, Nestor Dizon.

== Findings ==
The excavation team was able to excavate approximately 24 by 28 meters (79 ft × 92 ft) of land to an average of 90 cm (35 in) from the surface.

=== Stratigraphy ===
The following are the descriptions of stratigraphies without the volcanic eruption correlations according to the article:

- Layer 1 (Context 1):

top plow zone, matrix volcanic sand from 1991 Mt. Pinatubo eruption. Cultural materials in the form of earthenware and tradeware ceramics are observed and recorded.

- Layer 2 (Context 2):

dark layer with organics, but still volcanic sand. Artifacts fragmented and not oriented.

- Layer 3 (Context 14):

mottled layer with plow markings. Artifacts are fragmented with occasional pot base sitting on the context with their top parts missing (due to layer plowing).

- Layer 4 (Context 5):

light brownish layer with extensive in cultural deposits and features.

- Layer 5 etc. (Context 38, 65 & 212):

laminated natural layers of volcanic material that extended to more than two meters deep

- Context 239:

3.5 meters from the surface; three pieces of earthenware sherds, not weathered

=== Ceramics ===
Tradeware ceramics recovered from the site were dated as a mixture of 13th to 14th century and 16th century tradewares. Earthenware sherds were ubiquitous and several pot covers were recovered from different stratigraphies. However, no earthenware spindle whorls or net sinkers were recovered.

=== Metal Implements ===
At least three types of brass bangles, which were associated with burials, and two types of blades, which some have preserve fragments of sheathing or matting.

=== Features ===
Features recovered were postholes, hearths, middens, and plow marks. The postholes varied in their sizes, and 51 were recorded. Hearth remains were of ash and burnt stones and matrix concentrations. Middens were composed mostly of dumped ceramics.

=== Evidences of Tradeware from Neighboring Asian Countries ===
There are excavated tradeware ceramics identified to be from China, Thailand, Vietnam, and Burma. Chinese green lead glaze ware sherds that are known to have originated from the Tang Period were dated from the 13th–14th century, which was significantly younger than the time period of the Tang dynasty. Melendres points out that Addis believes that these are due to the continuation of the Tang tradition into later times.

It was also pointed out that the effects of the Chinese trade ban during the Ming dynasty can be seen from the few early Ming dynasty blue-and-white ceramics and the presence of ceramics from Thailand, Vietnam, and Burma. Celadon dishes found were similar to those found in the Twante district in Burma, while other celadon plates were most likely associated with Kalong wares from Thailand (15th–16th century).

Ceramics from Central Vietnam were also recovered and are determined to be manufactured in Binh Dinh during the Viet's conquest of Vijaya. Furthermore, there were also Swatow or Zhangzhou type porcelains recovered that are dated to the 16th–17th century. Melendres concluded that the presence of the Zhanzhou porcelains tells us that the Babo Balukbuk site was still being used until the arrival of the Spanish forces.

== Analysis ==
The recovered artifacts made the team conclude that the Dizon-1 site is a settlement. Their bases were on the several large postholes that may be reconstructed into house plans, the amount of recovered middens and hearths, the general cultural debris scattered, and on the density of the features.

The following sequence of habitation was also developed:

1. Before 2,300 b.p.: human habitation
2. Around 2,300 b.p.: Maraunot eruptive period covers the area with more than three meters of deposit
3. Around the 13th century C.E.: A settlement grew. The people built sturdy structures. They used earthenwares and stoneware pottery. Metal bangles and glass beads had metal implants and exchanged materials for tradeware ceramics. Rice production and consumption and use burial goods were practiced.
4. Around the 16th century: The settlement decreased and the area was replaced by ploughed fields for planting rice. It is also suggested that there was a coming different group of people about 200 years later.
5. Around 500 b.p.: Buag eruptive period covers the area with most likely airborne deposits.
6. Turn of the 20th century: Land was again used for agriculture for the cash crop sugarcane.
7. 1991: The latest eruption of Mt. Pinatubo left a thin additional layer of sandy material.

== See also ==
- Prehistory of Pampanga
