= Jess Española =

Filipino former animator, layout artist and assistant director (born 1959)

- Born: Jesus Española; 23 December 1959 (age 66); Caloocan, Rizal
- Other name: Kong Jess
- Education: University of the Philippines Diliman
- Occupations: Director; layout artist; animator
- Years active: 1985–2016
- Spouse: Marites Española
- Children: 2

Jesus "Jess" Española (born December 23, 1959) (Note: The official age of Jess Española is 56 in prior of the official date of September 13, 2016 where it established the news of Inquirer.net, so it combines the age (56) with his birthdate (Dec 23) without a year and Inquirer's published date (Sept 13, 2016), calculate with the year of 1959.) is a Filipino former animator, layout artist, special effects animator, timer and assistant director. He is best known for his work as the latter two of Fox's Futurama and The Simpsons. In his early career as an animator, prior in its introduction of outsourcing animation labors in the Philippines, he contributed with Hanna-Barbara for several animated series in late-1980s to early-1990s, most notably The Smurfs.

In 2008, Española is the first Asian and native Filipino (Kapampangan) to win the Primetime Emmy Award, The Academy of Television Arts and Sciences equivalent of the Academy Awards and one of the four major performing entertainment achievements in the United States, for his contribution as an Assistant Director of "Eternal Moonshine of the Simpson Mind" from the 19th season of The Simpsons. (Note: Some sources identified Española as being “the first Pinoy” to win an Emmy, but none of these Filipino-born have a Primetime Emmy, both win and nominated, before 2008; some have won Emmys other than Primetime in the past, including Ronnie Del Carmen won a Daytime Emmy while Rochit Tañedo and Rita Nazareno also won the News and Documentary Emmy and Regional Emmy Award, respectively.)

== Early life and education ==
Española was born in Caloocan, then in the province of Rizal (now Metro Manila), on December 23, 1959, and raised temporarily. He is conceived out of wedlock as a product of rape between his Ilonga teenage mother, when she was a high school student, and the Kapampangan father employer where she worked as a maid. His first name, Jesus, was named by his mother's friend who also became his godmother in Caloocan.

Before his birth, his mother and her younger sister lived in Guimaras during the Japanese occupation of the Philippines at the age of six and two prior as his grandfather was killed during the war. At his mother's age of sixteen, she left from Guimaras to Manila, went to search for her mother and took a job as a maid like her mother was, so she could go to school. Because she was popular in school, thanks for her talent in declamation and began receiving visits at home from suitors, she caught the attention of her male employer, she was raped by the father of a family where she worked as a maid. She kept her secret from her mother, resulting to her pregnancy; leaving to Caloocan, she was adopted by her friend to raise him with care. She later married a man from Pampanga, a town they moved in when he was at the age of nine.

He continued his elementary education at Pampanga graduated as a valedictorian amidst hunger, his stepfather forced him to work to the farm unconcerened of his education and well being. He was left unable to pursue high school education, he left his family as a result to pursue his dream. He worked as a dishwasher before entering high school. During his teenage years, he experienced hunger again during high school and he used his talent in drawing to get paid by his teachers and classmates just like in elementary years. After graduating high school, he attended the University of the Philippines Diliman, became a scholar for Fine Arts major in painting and studio arts when there was no animation curriculum during that time.

== Career ==
Since he graduated University of the Philippines with a Fine Arts degree, he started working with Burbank Animation Inc. an Australian studio branch in Makati in 1985-1988, and Fil-Cartoons, a subsidiary of Hanna-Barbera in Pasig where he served as lead animator and supervisor from 1988-1994. He spent much time of animation for several cartoon shows, particularly The New Yogi Bear Show and The Smurfs, Robinhood, Pirates of the Dark Water, Adams Family, The Dreamstone, Tom and Jerry Kids and many more sub-contracted animated episodes from the U.S and Europe. His exceptional talent was immediately noticed by the company, giving him the opportunity to be exposed with Hanna-Barbera in Los Angeles.

After he left Hanna-Barbera in the late-1994 due due to a decline in incoming projects, he worked at 7th Level Inc. for CD-ROM Edutainment Games for children for two years before joining Film Roman to work as a layout artist and assistant director for King of the Hill and Rough Draft Studios' Futurama, and later The Simpsons, a creation of Matt Groening for 20th Century Fox Animated Sitcom. One of the most notable episodes from the latter series was "Eternal Moonshine of the Simpson Mind", whose assistant directorial work for the episode eventually made history as the first Filipino ever to win a Primetime Emmy after he was not included in the nomination of the previous Futurama episode where he assisted the Supervising Director "Roswell That Ends Well", also won an Emmy but Assistant Directors were not included in the nomination during that time. One of the director of Futurama who bacame one of the Borad of Governors of the Television Academy insisted among the governors that Assistant Directors deserve to be included in the nomination.

== Personal life ==
Espanola went back to the Philippines in 2019 and taught drawing and animation at Holy Angel University in Angeles City for three years, from 2019 to 2023.

Year	Title	Credited as
1997–1998	King of the Hill	Layout artist, assistant director
1999–2003	Futurama	Layout artist, assistant director
2002	What a Cartoon!	Assistant director
2004–2016	The Simpsons	Layout artist, assistant director
2007	The Simpsons Movie	Character layout artist

=== Animator only ===
- The New Yogi Bear Show (1988)
- Police Academy: The Animated Series (1988–1989; uncredited)
- Fantastic Max (1988–1990)
- The Further Adventures of SuperTed (1989)
- The Smurfs (1989)
- Paddington Bear (1989–1990)
- Bill & Ted's Excellent Adventures (1990; uncredited)
- Tom & Jerry Kids (1991)

== Accolades ==
Year	Ceremony	Category	Television	Episode	Status	Ref/s
2008 (60th)	Primetime Creative Arts Emmy Awards	Outstanding Animated Program	The Simpsons	Eternal Moonshine of the Simpson Mind	Won	

Other awards given to Española are the Pamana Award in 2000, Reflection XII Award in 2000, Celebrity Chronicles Award in 2001, Pampanga Day Celebration Commission Professional Excellence Award in 2008, FASGI American Dream Award 2009, and MOKA – Most Outstanding Kapampangan Awards in 2010. Diosdado Macapagal Award 2016.
