= Anthony Murphy (artist) =

English painter (born 1956)

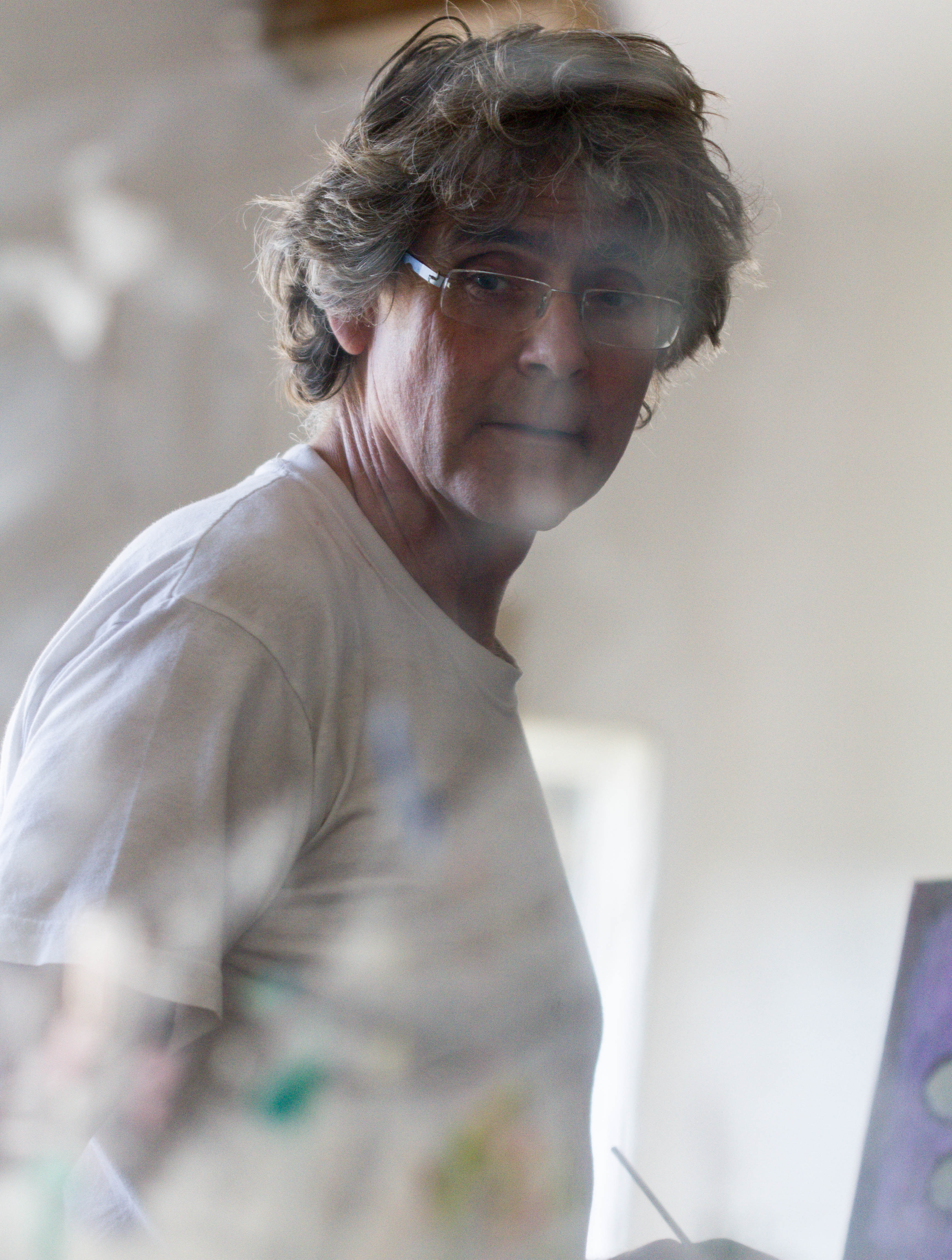
Murphy in 2013

Anthony Murphy (born 1956 in Buenos Aires) is an Argentinian-born English painter, with strong Irish connections. He exhibits regularly in Mayfair, London and Dublin, Ireland.

Murphy was a child-actor who played the eponymous hero in the British television serial, Tom Brown's Schooldays (1971). He won an Emmy Award for 'Best Lead Actor in a Miniseries' for his role as Tom Brown. The programme itself won 'Best Miniseries' after it was screened by PBS in 1973. Despite the critical acclaim, this was the only time he worked as an actor.

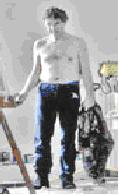
Anthony Murphy

Murphy studied Philosophy, Psychology and Physiology at New College, Oxford, from 1975 to 1978. He then married his first wife and moved to Ireland, working as a potter and an aerial photographer. But after four years he divorced, and returned to school to study law. Despite lacking passion for the law, Murphy pursued a career as a corporate lawyer, first in England then in Paris, France. In Paris he met and married his second wife. Murphy began to paint "to relieve the boredom of corporate law." Murphy's first painting exhibition in 1991 in London was a success, and his colorful Gauguin-esque paintings became highly desirable.

In 1992, Murphy relocated from Paris to a large country house near Carcassonne in the south of France to paint full-time.

His work is mainly in oil and pastel; he is known predominantly for his French and Irish scenes and his skill as a colourist. A retrospective of his work was shown in London in 2016. He currently has his studio in France and exhibits regularly.
