= Tom Brown's School Days =

1857 novel by Thomas Hughes

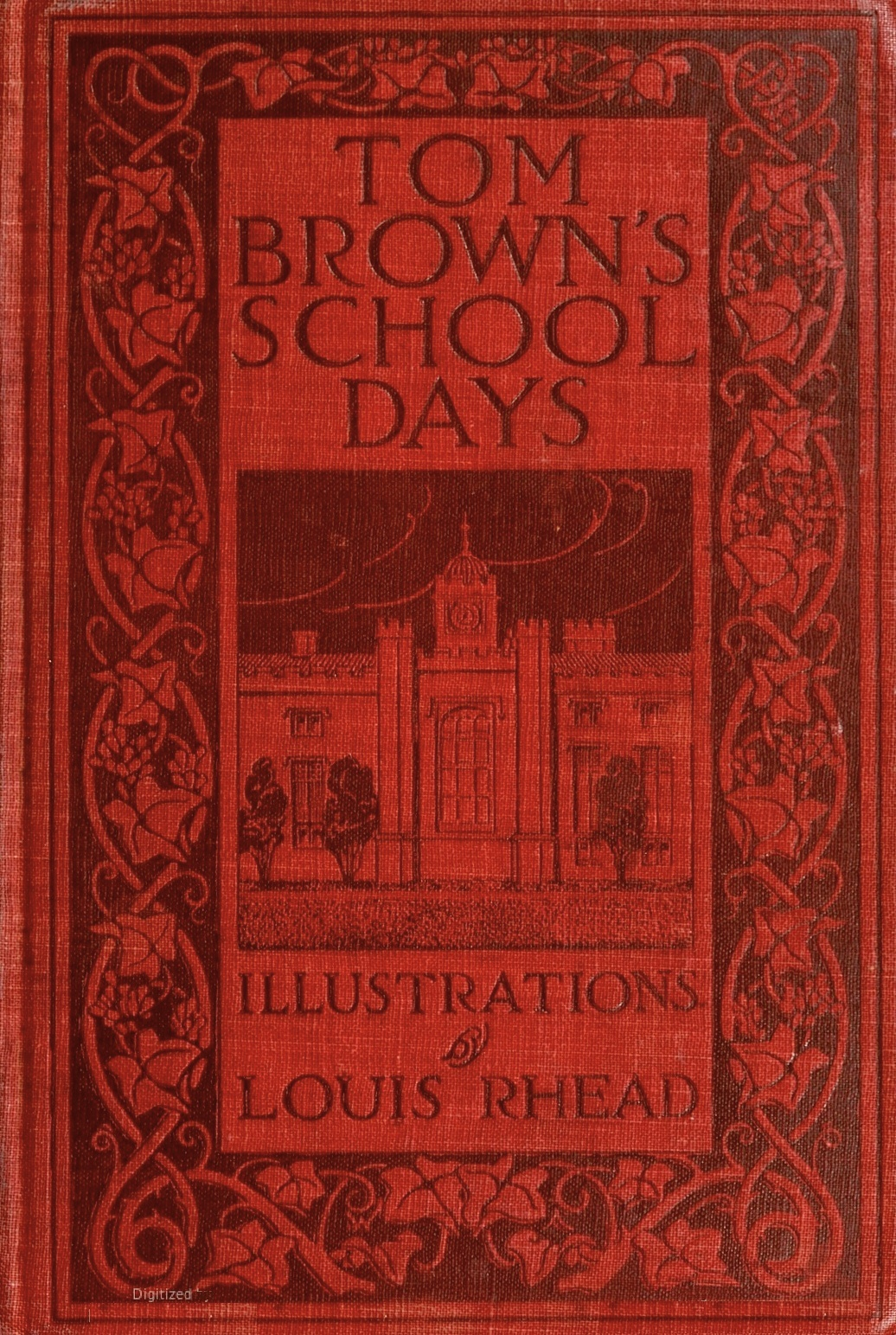
- Author: Thomas Hughes
- Language: English
- Genre: School story
- Publisher: Macmillan
- Publication date: 1857
- Publication place: United Kingdom
- Media type: Print (calfskin binding)
- Pages: 420
- ISBN: 0-19-283535-1
- OCLC: 42414413
- Dewey Decimal: 823.8
- LC Class: PR4809.H8 T66 1999
- Followed by: Tom Brown at Oxford
- Text: Tom Brown's School Days at Wikisource

Tom Brown's School Days (sometimes written Tom Brown's Schooldays, also published under the titles Tom Brown at Rugby, School Days at Rugby, and Tom Brown's School Days at Rugby) is a novel by Thomas Hughes, published in 1857. The story is set in the 1830s at Rugby School, an English public school. Hughes attended Rugby School from 1834 to 1842.

The novel was originally published as being "by an Old Boy of Rugby", and much of it is based on the author's experiences. Tom Brown is largely based on the author's brother George Hughes. George Arthur, another of the book's main characters, is generally believed to be based on Arthur Penrhyn Stanley (Dean Stanley). The fictional Tom's life also resembles the author's, in that the culminating event of his school career was a cricket match. The novel also features Dr Thomas Arnold (1795–1842), who was the actual headmaster of Rugby School from 1828 to 1841.

Tom Brown's School Days has been the source for several film and television adaptations. It also influenced the genre of British school novels, which began in the nineteenth century, and led to fictional depictions of schools such as Mr Chips's Brookfield, and St Trinian's. A sequel, Tom Brown at Oxford, was published in 1861.

== Synopsis ==
Tom Brown is energetic, stubborn, kind-hearted and athletic, rather than intellectual. He follows his feelings and the unwritten rules of the boys.

The early chapters of the novel deal with his childhood at his home in the Vale of White Horse. Much of the scene setting in the first chapter is deeply revealing of Victorian Britain's attitudes towards society and class, and contains a comparison of so-called Saxon and Norman influences on the country. This part of the book, when young Tom wanders the valleys freely on his pony, serves as a contrast with the hellish experiences in his first years at school.

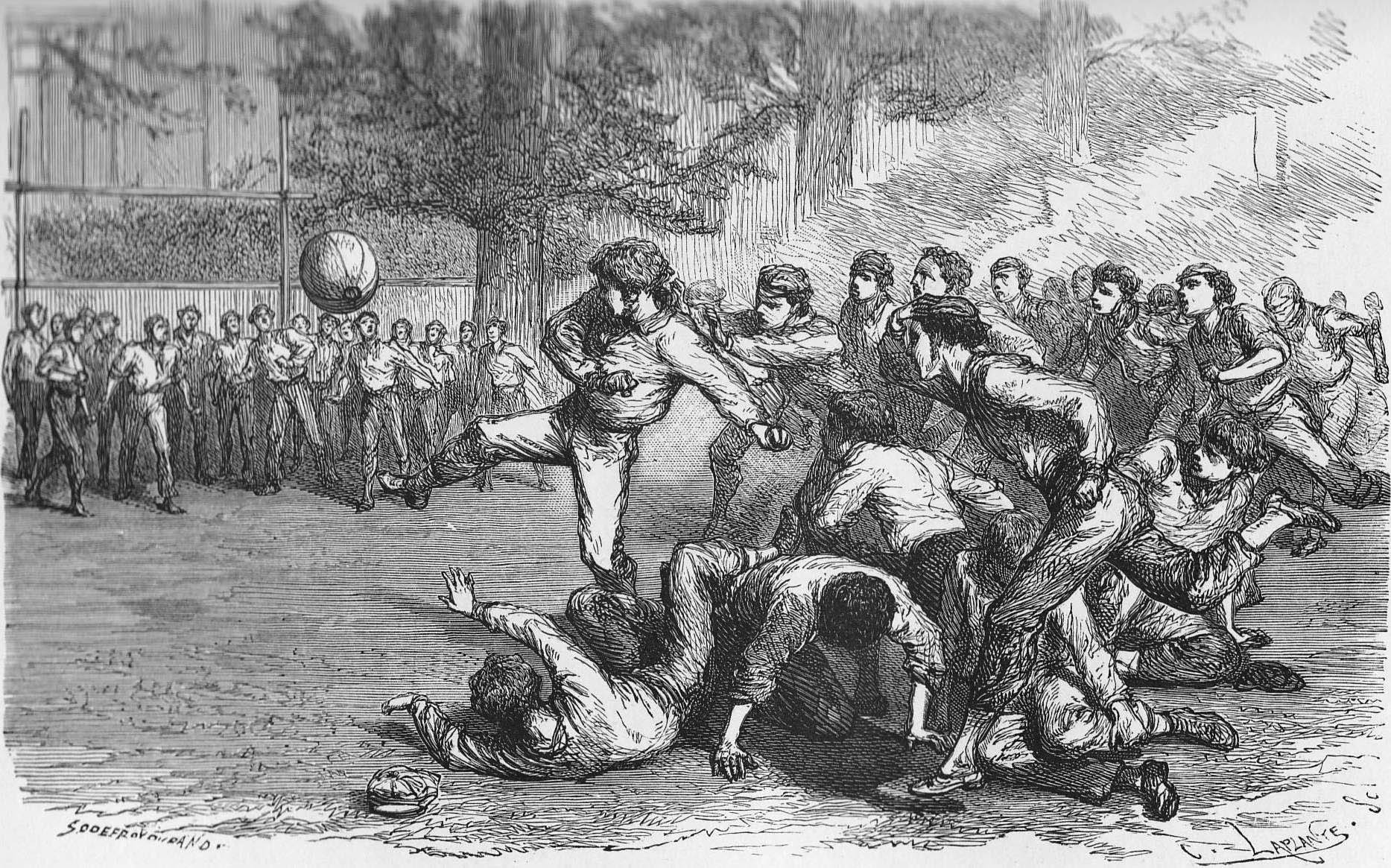
Illustration by Godefroy Durand for the 1875 French edition of the novel

His first school year is at a local school. His second year starts at a private school, but due to an epidemic of fever in the area, all the school's boys are sent home, and Tom is transferred mid-term to Rugby School.

On his arrival, the eleven-year-old Tom Brown is looked after by a more experienced classmate, Harry "Scud" East. Tom's nemesis at Rugby is the bully Flashman. The intensity of the bullying increases and after refusing to hand over a sweepstake ticket for the favourite in a horse race, Tom is deliberately burned in front of a fire. Tom and East defeat Flashman with the help of Diggs, a kind, comical, older boy. In their triumph they become unruly.

In the second half of the book, Dr Thomas Arnold (1795–1842), the historical headmaster of the school at the time, asks Tom to look after George Arthur, a frail, pious, academically brilliant, gauche, and sensitive new boy. A fight that Tom gets into to protect Arthur, and Arthur's nearly dying of fever, are described in detail. Tom and Arthur help each other and the friends develop into young gentlemen who say their nightly prayers, do not cheat on homework, and play in a cricket match. An epilogue shows Tom's return to Rugby and its chapel when he hears of Arnold's death.

== Main characters ==
- Tom Brown, a mid-term newcomer to Rugby School who learns many life lessons there (Note: The Rev. Augustus Orlebar was alleged to have been the person on whom Hughes based Tom Brown, though Hughes' brother, George, has been called a more plausible candidate.)
- Harry "Scud" East, an older boy who looks after Tom
- Dr Thomas Arnold (1795–1842), the headmaster of Rugby School from 1828 to 1841
- Flashman, a bully who targets and torments Tom
- Diggs, a jocular older student who helps Tom
- George Arthur, a frail newcomer whom Tom guides as East had guided him; perhaps based on Arthur Penrhyn Stanley
- Old Brooke, the School House captain who rules as a "football king", likely John Philip Gell (1816-1898)

== Major themes ==
A main element of the novel is Rugby School, with its traditions, and the reforms that were instituted there by Dr Arnold (1795–1842), the headmaster of the school from 1828 to 1841. He is portrayed as the perfect teacher and counsellor, and as managing everything behind the scenes. In particular, he is the one who "chums" Arthur with Tom.

The central theme of the novel is the development of boys. The symmetrical way in which Tom and Arthur supply each other's deficiencies shows that Hughes believed in the importance of physical development, boldness, fighting spirit, and sociability (Tom's contribution) as well as Christian morality and idealism (Arthur's).

The novel is essentially didactic and was not primarily written as an entertainment. As Hughes said:

Several persons, for whose judgment I have the highest respect, while saying very kind things about this book, have added, that the great fault of it is 'too much preaching'; but they hope I shall amend in this matter should I ever write again. Now this I most distinctly decline to do. Why, my whole object in writing at all was to get the chance of preaching! When a man comes to my time of life and has his bread to make, and very little time to spare, is it likely that he will spend almost the whole of his yearly vacation in writing a story just to amuse people? I think not. At any rate, I wouldn't do so myself.

— Thomas Hughes, Preface to the sixth edition

== Impact ==
Although there were as many as 90 stories set in British boarding schools published between Sarah Fielding's The Governess, or The Little Female Academy in 1749 and 1857, Tom Brown's School Days was responsible for bringing the school story genre to much wider attention. Tom Brown's School Days' influence on the genre of British school novels includes the fictional schools of Billy Bunter, Mr. Chips, St. Trinian's, and Harry Potter series.

The book contains an account of a game of rugby football, the variant of football played at Rugby School (with many differences from the modern forms). The book's popularity helped to spread the popularity of this sport beyond the school.

In Japan, Tom Brown's School Days was probably the most popular textbook of English-language origin for high-school students during the Meiji period (1868–1912). In 1899, an abridged version of the book (omitting chapter 9 of part 1, and chapters 5 and 7 of part 2) was published in Japanese translation. A subsequent, two-part, Japanese translation by Tsurumatsu Okamoto and Tomomasa Murayama appeared in 1903 and 1904, which, in addition to the previous omissions, also omitted the scene at the cricket match, due to the translators' stated ignorance of the game of cricket. In the preface to this version, the translators praised the British education system, citing the example of the friendship between Tom and Dr Arnold as an example of how to raise a great nation. Another partial translation, consisting only of part 1 of the book, was released in 1912 by schoolteacher Nagao Tachibana. A fourth translation, also abridged, by Sada Tokinoya arrived in 1925. Finally, a complete translation was released in 1947 that eventually ran to ten separate editions.

== Dramatic adaptations ==
Tom Brown's School Days has had several screen adaptations, including:

- Tom Brown's Schooldays (1916 film) (silent)
- Tom Brown's School Days (1940 film)
- Tom Brown's Schooldays (1951 film)
- Tom Brown's Schooldays (1971 TV miniseries)
- Tom Brown's Schooldays (2005 TV film)

In the 1940 U.S. film, the role of Dr Thomas Arnold was portrayed by Cedric Hardwicke, Tom Brown was played by Jimmy Lydon, and Freddie Bartholomew played East. The role of Dr Thomas Arnold as a reform-minded educator was given greater prominence than in the novel. The entertainment journal Variety praised this, saying, "It probably results in a better picture, since Cedric Hardwicke, who plays the wise and kindly teacher, is much better qualified to carry a story than is any Hollywood prodigy. Hardwicke’s performance is one of the best he has ever given on the screen". In the 1951 British film, Robert Newton portrayed Thomas Arnold, and John Howard Davies portrayed Tom Brown.

The 1971 five-part television miniseries was by the BBC, and starred Anthony Murphy as Tom Brown and Iain Cuthbertson as Dr. Arnold. It was later shown on PBS's Masterpiece Theatre in the U.S., and both the programme and Murphy's lead performance won Emmy Awards.

The two-hour 2005 TV film was by ITV. It starred Alex Pettyfer as Tom and Stephen Fry as Dr Arnold.

A musical version with music by Chris Andrews and book and lyrics by Jack and Joan Maitland was presented at the Cambridge Theatre in London's West End in 1972. The production starred Keith Chegwin, Roy Dotrice, Simon Le Bon, and Tony Sympson.

A full-cast audio drama dramatised by Joe Dunlop and directed by Chris Wallis was first broadcast in 2001 on BBC Radio 4.

== References in other works ==
- Tom Brown at Oxford
- Terry Pratchett confirmed that the section of his 1989 novel Pyramids set at the Assassin's Guild School is a parody of Tom Brown's School Days.

=== Flashman ===
The character of Flashman was adapted by the British writer George MacDonald Fraser as the adult narrator and hero (or anti-hero) of his popular series of "Flashman" historical novels called The Flashman Papers. In one of them, Flashman in the Great Game, the character whom Fraser named Harry Flashman reads Tom Brown's School Days, which refers to his youth, and its popularity causes him a few social troubles. Fraser's Flashman novels also include several other characters from Tom Brown's School Days, for example George Speedicut and Tom Brown himself in the book Flashman's Lady (1977). Flashman describes Tom's adult form as "...a giant of a man...like some boxer...". Flashman also encounters the character of "Scud" East twice, first in Flashman at the Charge, when both he and East are prisoners of war during the Crimean War, and again in Flashman in the Great Game, at the Siege of Cawnpore during the Indian Mutiny of 1857.

Flashman made some passing references to Brown in earlier novels, referring to him as "East's odious friend" in Flashman at the Charge and during Flashman's recollection of his expulsion in Flashman.

== See also ==
- Tom Brown's School Museum, a museum in Uffington, Oxfordshire
