= Tom Brown's Schooldays (TV serial) =

- Based on: Tom Brown's School Days by Thomas Hughes
- Written by: Anthony Steven
- Directed by: Gareth Davies
- Starring: Anthony Murphy; Iain Cuthbertson; Simon Fisher Turner; Richard Morant
- Country of origin: United Kingdom
- Original language: English
- No. of episodes: 5

Production
- Producer: John McRae
- Running time: 225 min

Original release
- Network: BBC1
- Release: 14 November 1971 – 11 February 1973

Tom Brown's Schooldays is a 1971 television serial adaptation of the 1857 Thomas Hughes novel Tom Brown's Schooldays. Consisting of five 45-minute long episodes, the series was directed by Gareth Davies and used a screenplay by Anthony Steven.

== Plot ==
Tom Brown's school is closed down due to a local epidemic, and he returns to his home in Uffington. Here he has an unpleasant interaction with a visitor, Sir Richard Flashman, who mistreats one of Tom's friends and attempts to abuse the housemaid. Tom stands up to him on both occasions and by way of revenge, Sir Richard persuades Tom's father to send Tom to Rugby School with the intention that his own son, Gerald Flashman, should bully him there. At Rugby, Tom meets the new reforming headmaster Dr. Arnold who is determined to reverse Rugby's recent decline. Tom is also befriended by another junior boy East, who is also a favourite victim of Flashman. The two take refuge in East's study, while Flashman and the other bullies attempt to smoke them out. They are caught by the School House Captain Brooke, who gives Flashman a caning. Brooke warns the boys about the evils of bullying, but this has little impact upon Flashman and his gang, who roast Tom over a fire and toss him in a blanket, causing him injury. None of the boys — not even Tom himself — will reveal the identity of the culprits, and Flashman goes unpunished. When Sir Richard visits the school and finds Tom's spirit still unbroken, he beats Flashman for his failure, causing Flashman to become even more devious. With the help of a local gamekeeper Cully, Flashman frames Tom for poaching, for which Tom receives a flogging by the headmaster. However, Cully's daughter Rosie knows the truth and after much soul-searching turns her father in. Tom is exonerated, and Flashman sentenced to be flogged and expelled. Flashman arranges for his father to rescue him before the chastisement begins, but after Dr. Arnold tells Sir Richard how Flashman had blamed him for his bad behaviour, he leaves his son to his fate. The story ends with Tom welcoming a new boy, in much the same way East had earlier welcomed him.

== History ==
Tom Brown's Schooldays originally screened on the BBC1 Sunday afternoon slot, which often showed serialisations of classics aimed at a family audience. It made some free adaptations to Hughes's novel, creating the role of Flashman's father, and added new sub-plots about Flashman and Arnold. It also included scenes of bullying and corporal punishment which may have been too graphic for family viewing. "Clean-up TV" campaigner Mary Whitehouse claimed that the programme broke the BBC's guidelines on the depiction of sadistic violence.

After its 1971 premiere on the BBC, the series was later shown on Masterpiece Theatre in the United States in January and February 1973 through a grant from the Mobil Oil Corporation. In his review in The New York Times, critic Howard Thompson wrote, "Two previous film versions of Tom Brown's Schooldays (one from England) pale beside this home‐screen project, which so far (two chapters) seems almost too good to be true, even from Masterpiece Theater." The program won the 1973 Primetime Emmy Award for Outstanding Limited Series, and actor Anthony Murphy won the Primetime Emmy Award for Outstanding Lead Actor in a Limited or Anthology Series or Movie for his portrayal of Tom Brown.

The 1976 television play Tomkinson's Schooldays (later incorporated into the Ripping Yarns series) is a parody of the 1971 television adaptation of Tom Brown's Schooldays.

== Cast ==
- Anthony Murphy as Tom Brown
- Iain Cuthbertson as Dr. Thomas Arnold
- Louise Jameson as Mary Arnold
- Simon Fisher Turner as Harry "Scud" East
- Richard Morant as Flashman
- Barry Stokes as Brooke
- Gerald Flood as Sir Richard Flashman
- Richard Gibson as Sunning
- Christopher Guard as Darcy
- Daniel Hill as Harry
- John Hug as Druce
- Robin Langford as Martin
- John Paul as Mr. Brown
