= The Charge of the Light Brigade (1968 film) =

- Film poster
- Directed by: Tony Richardson
- Written by: Charles Wood; John Osborne
- Produced by: Neil Hartley
- Starring: Trevor Howard; John Gielgud; Vanessa Redgrave; Harry Andrews; Jill Bennett; David Hemmings; Alan Dobie; Norman Rossington
- Cinematography: David Watkin
- Edited by: Kevin Brownlow; Hugh Raggett
- Music by: John Addison
- Production company: Woodfall Film Productions
- Distributed by: United Artists
- Release dates: 10 April 1968 (Premiere); 12 April 1968 (London)
- Running time: 139 minutes 130 minutes (TCM print)
- Country: United Kingdom
- Language: English
- Budget: $6.5 million
- Box office: $1 million (US/ Canada rental)$3.2 million (total)

The Charge of the Light Brigade is a 1968 British DeLuxe Color satirical war film made by Woodfall Film Productions and distributed by United Artists, depicting parts of the Crimean War and the eponymous charge. It was directed by Tony Richardson and produced by Neil Hartley. Its animated credits and linking passages were created by Richard Williams, drawing on the satirical use of Victorian-era jingoistic images. This film features Richardson's daughters Natasha and Joely in their debuts.

== Plot ==
As the Crimean War looms over Britain in 1853, Captain Louis Nolan, a young and ambitious cavalry officer, joins the 11th Hussars. Treated with suspicion and disdain due to his past service in India, Nolan clashes with the pompous and arrogant commander of the regiment, Lord Cardigan, culminating in a dispute over a bottle of Moselle (the "Black Bottle" affair). After Nolan and Cardigan's feud is publicised in the press, the senior general Lord Raglan forces them to reconcile to prevent further embarrassment to the army. Nolan is transferred out of the 11th Hussars to serve as a staff officer for Raglan.

After Britain declares war on Russia, Lord Raglan organises a military expedition to Crimea, and appoints Lord Cardigan as the commander of a Light Brigade of cavalry. Cardigan is outraged, however, when his brother-in-law, Lord Lucan, is given overall command of the cavalry. When the expedition arrives in Crimea, Lucan and Cardigan prove incapable of co-operating with each other, and the Light Brigade is sidelined at the Battle of Alma, where the infantry reap all of the glory.

Captain Nolan grows frustrated at the cavalry's inaction and the bumbling leadership of the aristocratic generals, and yearns to prove himself in battle. An opportunity presents itself as the Russians attack the British redoubts at Balaclava, but both Raglan and Lucan hesitate to take action. Nolan, growing agitated, implores Raglan to make use of the cavalry. Raglan relents, finally issuing an order instructing the Light Brigade to intercept the Russians before they can capture abandoned artillery pieces at the redoubts; Nolan insists on personally delivering the order to Lord Lucan.

Lucan, who cannot see the redoubts from his position in the nearby valley, initially rejects the order. An enraged Nolan gestures wildly towards the redoubts in an attempt to point out the objective to Lucan and Cardigan, but they mistakenly believe he is indicating a strong Russian battery at the opposite end of the valley. Though both men recognise that a frontal attack against artillery would be suicidal, they feel that they have no choice but to carry out Raglan's order. Nolan fails to realise that the order has been misinterpreted, and enthusiastically volunteers to join the charge.

As the Light Brigade begins to advance down the valley, Nolan suddenly realises the mistake and desperately attempts to alert Cardigan, but is immediately killed by a cannon shot, becoming the first casualty of the charge. Cardigan ignores Nolan's final pleas and leads the Brigade straight toward the Russian battery, being subjected to withering artillery fire. After sustaining devastating casualties, the Brigade reaches its target, briefly engaging the Russians in a bloody melee before hastily retreating. Only Cardigan manages to escape the carnage unhurt.

Upon returning to the British lines, Cardigan is admonished by Raglan for recklessly attacking the wrong objective. Cardigan attempts to shift the blame to Lucan, who in turn blames Raglan. As the generals bicker amongst themselves, the survivors of the Light Brigade euthanise their wounded horses.

== Cast ==
- David Hemmings as Captain Louis Nolan
- Trevor Howard as Lord Cardigan
- Vanessa Redgrave as Clarissa Morris
- Mark Burns as Captain William Morris
- John Gielgud as Lord Raglan
- Harry Andrews as Lord Lucan
- Jill Bennett as Mrs. Fanny Duberly
- Peter Bowles as Captain Henry Duberly
- Mark Dignam as General Richard Airey
- Leo Britt as General James Scarlett
- Howard Marion-Crawford as Sir George Brown
- T. P. McKenna as William Howard Russell
- Corin Redgrave as Featherstonehaugh
- Alan Dobie as Mogg
- Ben Aris as Maxse
- Norman Rossington as Sergeant-Major Corbett
- Willoughby Goddard as Squire
- Georges Douking as Marshall Jacques de St. Arnaud
- Ambrose Coghill as Douglas
- Andrew Faulds as Quaker Preacher
- Natasha Richardson as Flower Girl at Wedding (uncredited)
- Joely Richardson as Extra (uncredited)

== Production ==
=== Writing ===
The screenplay was written by Charles Wood from a first draft (uncredited) by John Osborne. It aimed to be brutally authentic, based in part on the research in Cecil Woodham-Smith's The Reason Why (1953). The film included animations by Richard Williams, based on the 19th century graphic style of Punch magazine, to explain the political events surrounding the battle. The music score was by John Addison and the cinematography by David Watkin.

In 2002, Osborne's unproduced original script was reworked into a radio play for BBC Radio 4. The original airing featured Charles Dance as Cardigan, Donald Sinden as Lucan, Joseph Fiennes as Nolan, Alec McCowen as Raglan and Lynne Miller as Fanny Duberly.

=== Casting ===
Laurence Harvey had originally purchased the film rights for The Reason Why for his own production company and Joseph E. Levine. At the conclusion of a lengthy settlement in Richardson's favour, Harvey demanded a role in the film. He was given the role of Prince Radziwill (Polish article), a Polish officer, but his part was edited out of the completed film. This lawsuit led to a falling out between Tony Richardson and John Osborne, when the latter refused to alter his script for being too close to Woodham-Smith's book. Harvey is clearly visible in one scene that takes place in a London theatre and a performance of "Macbeth."

In his memoirs, Tony Richardson mentions approaching Rex Harrison to play Lord Cardigan. However, a newspaper erroneously reported that George C. Scott was being cast in the role. This news infuriated Harrison and he dropped out of the project, leaving Trevor Howard to be cast.

The director's daughters, Joely Richardson and Natasha Richardson, appeared in the film in very small uncredited roles.

=== Filming ===
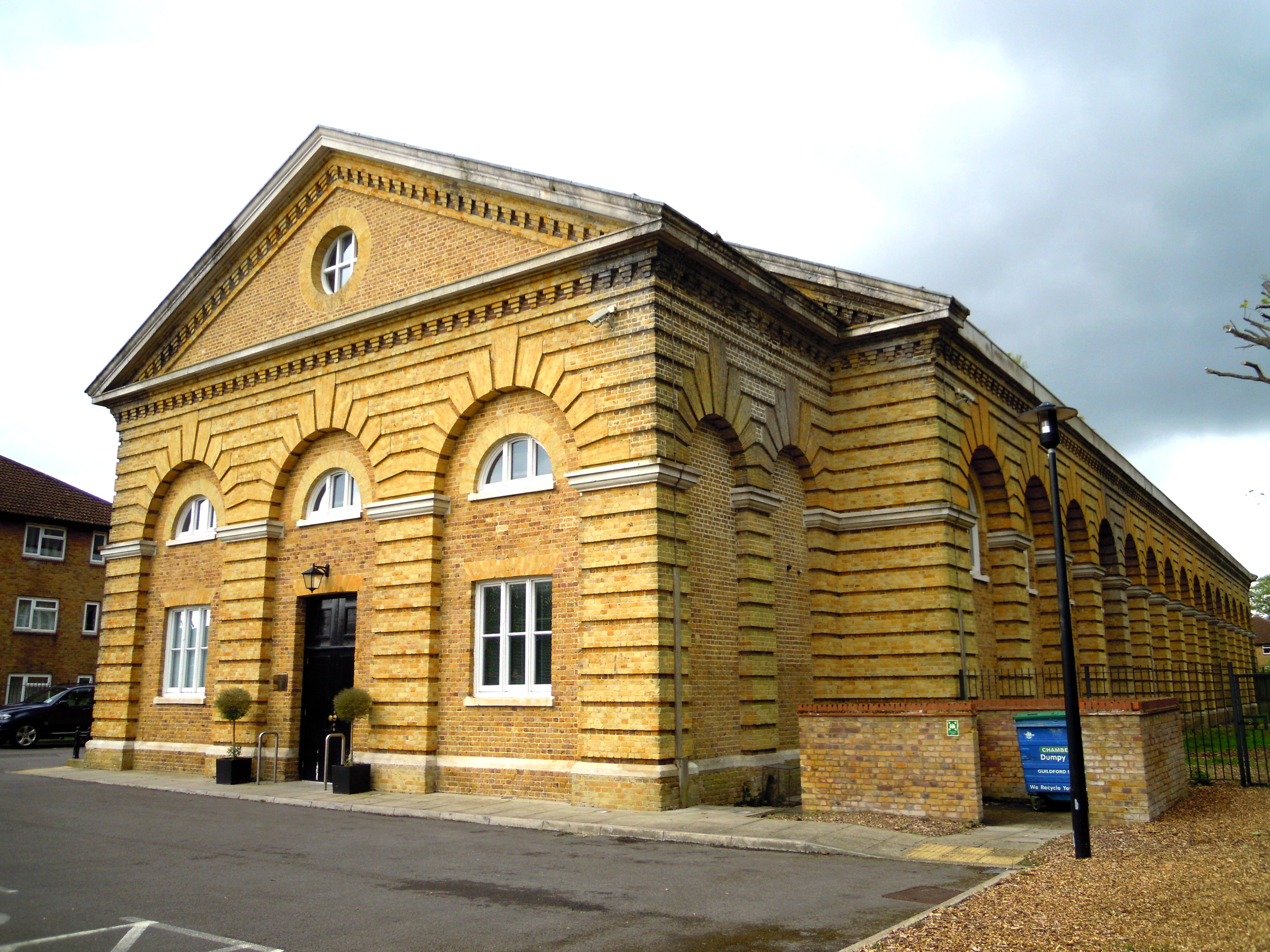
Cavalry Riding School building at Beaumont Barracks in Aldershot featured in the early scenes

The scene where troopers rush into position to salute Cardigan as he takes a morning walk with his dogs was shot at 6 Carlton House Terrace, St James's, London, a few doors along from the earl's actual London residence of 17 Carlton House Terrace. Other London street scenes were filmed in the Royal Naval Hospital, Greenwich. The Royal Mint, opposite the Tower of London, represented Horseguards, the headquarters of the Army.

The barracks scenes in the first half of the film were filmed at Beaumont Barracks in Aldershot in Hampshire, while the 'Crimea' scenes, including the Charge itself, were filmed in Turkey with the action sequences directed by Bob Simmons.

== Release ==
The film had two Royal charity benefits, on Wednesday, 10 and Thursday 11 April (the first attended by Prince Philip) before opening at the Odeon Leicester Square.

=== Reception ===
The film was not screened to critics in advance of its release with Richardson writing to The Times newspaper criticizing English critics as "spoilt and demanding children" and that they were "the most personal, the most superficial and with the least good will in the world". Despite this, the film received generally positive reviews but proved a box office bomb.

The film was produced during a time of public frustration over the Vietnam War and during a period of anti-war sentiment. It has been argued that in retrospect it can be seen as a warning against military interventions in other lands.

The Japanese filmmaker Akira Kurosawa cited this movie as one of his 100 favorite films.

On review aggregator website Rotten Tomatoes, the film holds an approval rating of 60% based on 5 reviews, with an average rating of 6.5/10.

=== Awards ===
The Charge of the Light Brigade was nominated for seven BAFTA Film Awards, but failed to win in any category.

- Nominee Best Music Anthony Asquith Award (John Addison)
- Nominee Best Actor BAFTA (Trevor Howard)
- Nominee Best Art Direction BAFTA (Edward Marshall)
- Nominee Best Cinematography BAFTA (David Watkin)
- Nominee Best Costume Design BAFTA (David Walker)
- Nominee Best Film Editing BAFTA (Kevin Brownlow)
- Nominee Best Sound BAFTA (Simon Kaye)

== Historical accuracy ==
For plot purposes, the film incorrectly portrays its protagonist Captain Nolan at the centre of the 'black bottle' affair, when Moselle wine was ordered for a guest rather than the champagne that Lord Cardigan had required. The wine was served in a black bottle, causing Cardigan to assume that the officers were consuming porter, a drink for enlisted men. The officer actually concerned was Captain John Reynolds.

In the film all of the Light Brigade regiments are outfitted with cherry coloured breeches when only the 11th Hussars wore breeches of that colour. Officers and troopers of the other four regiments wore dark blue breeches, with double yellow stripes, or in the case of the 17th Lancers, double white stripes. In one scene a single trooper of the 17th is correctly attired.

The film's depiction of the Battle of Balaclava shows the initial Russian attack on the redoubts and of course the Charge of the Light Brigade, but elides both the stand of the 93rd Sutherland Highlanders (the "Thin Red Line") and the Charge of the Heavy Brigade. According to director Tony Richardson, the Heavy Brigade scene was filmed but later cut at the studio's behest.

Likewise, Fanny Duberly is shown to be seduced by Lord Cardigan; although she was in the Crimea, she did not have an affair with Cardigan.

The film was criticised for presenting the impulsive and haughty Captain Louis Nolan in a generally positive light, as well portraying the adventurous Fanny Duberly as unfaithful and eager for carnage.
