= James Brudenell =

James Brudenell may refer to:

- James Brudenell, 5th Earl of Cardigan (1715–1811), British politician
- James Brudenell, 7th Earl of Cardigan (1797–1868), British politician and soldier
- James Brudenell (died 1746), British Member of Parliament for Andover and Chichester

== See also ==
- Brudenell Baronets
- Brudenell (disambiguation)
