= Louis Nolan =

British Army officer

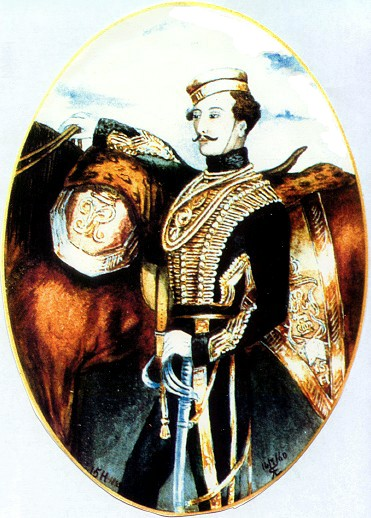
- Born: 4 January 1818; York County, Upper Canada
- Died: 25 October 1854 (aged 36) near Balaclava, Crimea, Russian Empire
- Military career
- Allegiance: Austrian Empire; United Kingdom
- Branch: (Austrian Empire) Austrian Army; British Army
- Rank: Lieutenant (Austria); Captain (UK)
- Conflicts: Crimean War: Battle of Balaclava; Charge of the Light Brigade †

Lewis Edward Nolan (4 January 1818 – 25 October 1854), known to his family as Louis Nolan and in Austrian service as Ludwig Nolan was a British Army officer and cavalry tactician best known for his role and death in the Charge of the Light Brigade during the Crimean War. Born to an infantry officer and minor official and his wife, Nolan was educated at the Austrian Pioneer Corps School at Tulln, where he was noted as an enthusiastic horseman and military theorist. After early graduation he was commissioned as a subaltern in the 10th Austrian Hussar regiment, serving in Austria, Hungary and on the Polish frontier, where he again became known for his horsemanship and was promoted to senior lieutenant. Due to the nepotism in the Austro-Hungarian armed forces, Nolan transferred to the British Army as a cornet in the 15th Light Dragoons.

Deployed in India, Nolan was eventually made the regimental riding master and an aide-de-camp to General George Berkeley, commander-in-chief in Madras, accompanying him on horse trials to evaluate the use of geldings as cavalry mounts rather than stallions, and was made a captain in 1850. Returning to Great Britain in 1851, he toured continental Europe and wrote two books on horsemanship and cavalry theory, the second of which, Cavalry: Its History and Tactics, was universally acclaimed and led to the adoption of a Nolan-designed saddle by the British Army. A trusted voice on cavalry matters, Nolan was dispatched to the Middle East in the early days of the Crimean War to hunt for appropriate mounts. After returning he was attached to the staff of General Richard Airey, and in this role delivered the order that led to the Charge of the Light Brigade.

Forty percent of the Light Brigade's soldiers were killed, wounded, captured or rendered unfit for service, including Nolan, who was the first casualty of the charge. Contemporary accounts blamed Nolan for failing to properly communicate the order, either accidentally or deliberately, while some modern historians apportion the blame not only to Nolan but also Lord Raglan, commander of the British forces in the Crimea, and the cavalry commander, Lord Lucan.

== Early life and education ==
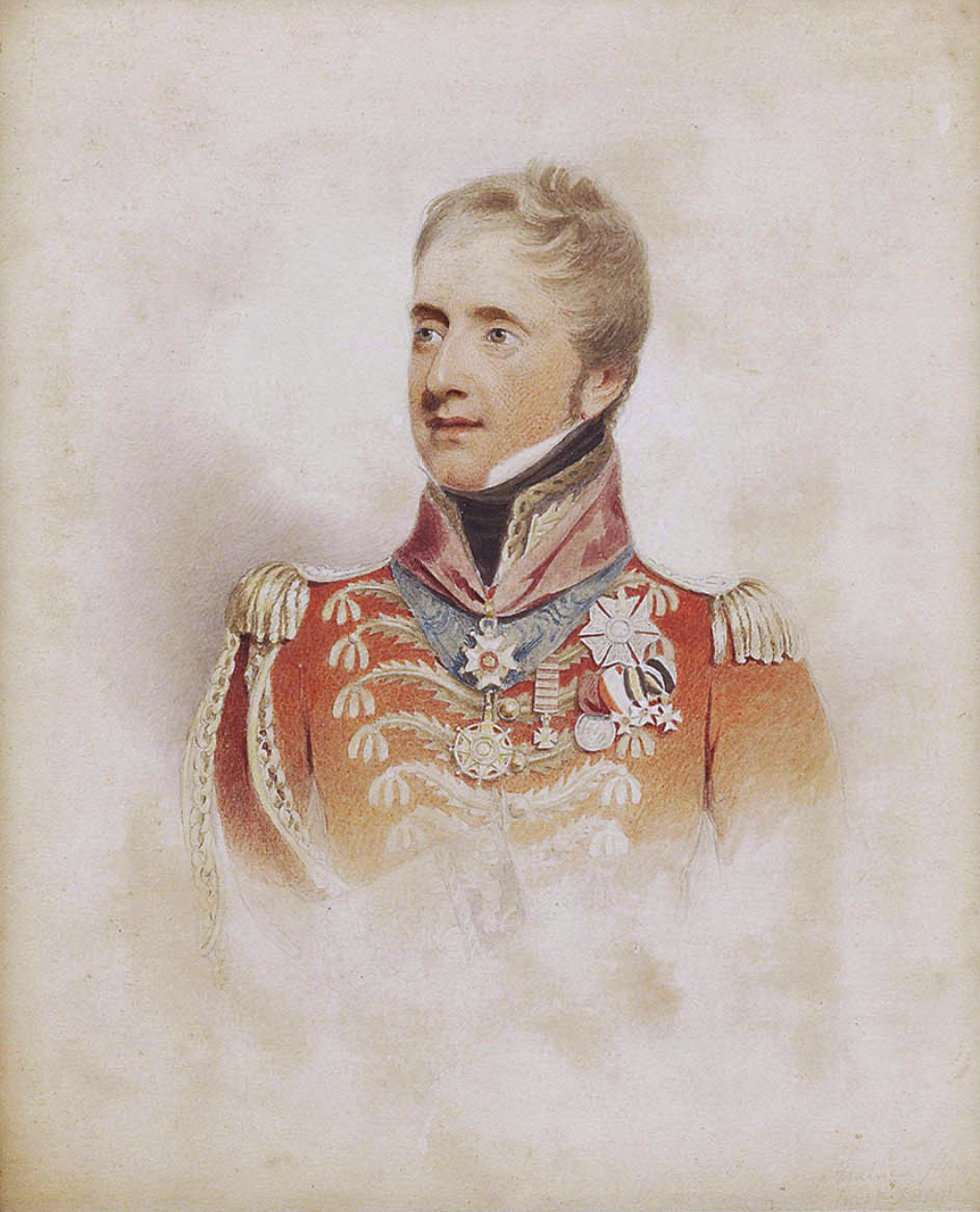
Lord Fitzroy Somerset, who interviewed Nolan and permitted him to join the British Army

Nolan was born on 4 January 1818 to Captain John Babington Nolan (1786–1850), of the 70th (Surrey) Regiment of Foot, and Elizabeth (née Hartley), in York County, Upper Canada. The Nolans had a family tradition of military service; his grandfather Babington Nolan, whose family came from County Carlow, Ireland, had served in the 13th Light Dragoons. After leaving the army, John Nolan was appointed honorary British Vice-Consul (an unpaid post) at Milan, then part of the Austrian Empire. The post of Vice-Consul gave John Nolan access to Austrian society and, through the influence of an Austrian archduke, he secured for Louis a cadetship in the Austrian Army (10th Imperial and Royal Hussars); he was accepted into the Pionier-Corps-Schule at Tulln at the age of 14, where he was known as Ludwig by his fellow cadets. His father's desire to see him given a chance to enter a prestigious branch of the armed forces meant that Nolan was regularly transferred to other cadet schools to learn more about the military. Enthusiastic about the cavalry, he was noted as an excellent horseman and student of military theory, as well as history. With the multi-lingual nature of Austria-Hungary, he also studied languages, including Hungarian. Other subjects studied there included fortification, water engineering, mathematics, fencing, swimming and bridge-building. Nolan graduated from the Pioneer School a year early in May 1835, probably following a recommendation from Prince Liechtenstein, and was made a subaltern in the 10th Austrian Hussar regiment.

Nolan served in Austria, Hungary and on the Polish frontier, and was again noted for his horsemanship and language skills. His confidential report from 1838 commended his "great zeal and application", and he was highly popular within the regiment, rising to become the senior lieutenant. Despite this, his status as a foreigner and a commoner limited his opportunities for promotion. Although promotions in the Austrian Army theoretically were merit-based, in practice favours and money were unofficially exchanged to secure them. Nolan's father attempted to get him a commission with the British Army, with little success until Nolan's return to the United Kingdom for the coronation of Queen Victoria in July 1838. While there, he secured an interview with Lord Fitzroy Somerset while his father negotiated with the Austrian General Eduard Clam-Gallas to permit Nolan to leave the Austrian army. On 23 April 1839, Nolan purchased a commission as a Cornet in the 15th Light Dragoons of the British Army for the price of £450. His resignation from the Austrian army was never formalized, and he was not struck off the rolls until 31 October 1899, 45 years after his death.

== 15th Light Dragoons ==
=== India ===
Despite the negative associations with service there, Nolan had deliberately transferred to a regiment operating in India. He initially travelled to Maidstone, where the 15th maintained a troop to train new recruits, under the command of Captain George Key. He then caught a troopship to Bombay, the Malabar, which arrived on 9 November. Soon after arrival he fell ill and was granted two years of sick leave, starting from 26 March 1840, and returned to Britain. He returned to active service in June 1841, again to the Maidstone depot, and became a Lieutenant on the 19th. He went on leave again in August to take the riding master's course and exam, and returned on 8 March 1842, newly qualified.

His attachment to the Maidstone depot gave Nolan the opportunity to further study and practice cavalry theory; he met several other officers with a similar interest, including Captain Key, with whom he became close friends. By 1842 his time at Maidstone had ended, and he departed for India in October, arriving at Madras on 9 May 1843. The 15th Light Dragoons were stationed in Bangalore, a relatively peaceful area, and Nolan did not see action during his time there. He was appointed regimental riding master on 13 August 1844, in recognition of his expertise at horsemanship. In his spare time, Nolan raced his horse Arab Beauty. At the Bangalore Cantonment Races in October 1846, he placed second in two races, and won both the Galloway Stakes and Ladies' Purse. A year later he entered Sahagun, without success.

As regimental riding master he introduced substantial changes to the cavalry training programme, reintroducing the use of leaping bars, training individual soldiers before teaching formation riding to entire squads, and appointing a dedicated soldier in each troop who was trained to break in new horses. Over the next few years the regiment's standard of horsemanship rose, increasing Nolan's reputation. When the regiment was inspected by Major General John Aitchison, a man known for his high standards, he wrote that:

Nolan's system of training horses and teaching riding is worthy of being more generally known. The seat of the men is more uniform and the hand light and firm, and as the hand and heel work together the horses in the ranks are steady to a degree I did not expect to see on a regiment mounted on entire horses.

Nolan then became a staff officer, joining the staff of General George Berkeley, commander-in-chief in Madras, as an aide-de-camp in January 1849. He quickly became close friends with Berkeley's two sons, Charles and George, who were also enthusiastic about horse-racing. In 1850 Nolan accompanied Berkeley on a tour of the region, conducting horse trials to evaluate the use of geldings as cavalry mounts rather than stallions, and was also promoted, purchasing a Captaincy on 8 March. Despite these successes, Nolan recognised that his prospects were far more limited in India than in England, and he could not afford the increased costs of serving in the colonies. At the same time, service in India was not taken seriously by many of the officers in high command, and would not be sufficient on its own to advance him. Accordingly, he obtained two years sick leave on 16 January 1851 and returned to England, intending to tour Europe and write a book on cavalry theory.

=== Grand tour and cavalry theory ===
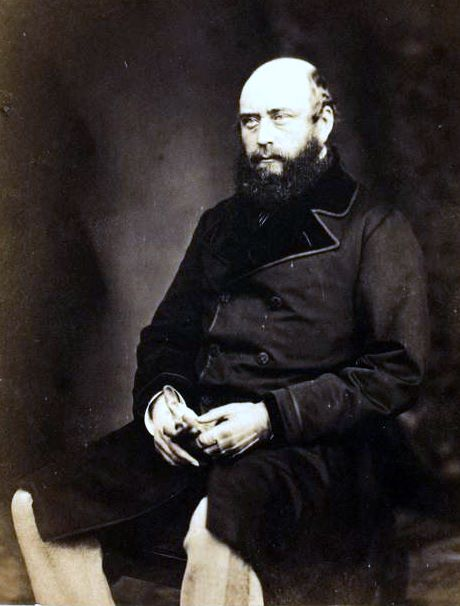
Duke of Cambridge, who attended tests of "Nolan's saddle", later ordered and used by the British Army. (Collodion, 1855, by Roger Fenton)

After a brief period in England, Nolan and Colonel George Key toured the continent, visiting countries including France, Russia, Sweden and the German states. The Swedish Horse Guards under Curt von Stedingk left a particular impression, with Nolan later writing that they were "one of the best regiments of foreign cavalry I have ever seen", and he was also impressed by François Baucher, initially considering simply translating Baucher's Méthode d'équitation into English. In Russia, he attended a military review of Cossack and Circassian cavalry, and passing through Germany, observed the Saxon dragoons. Eventually, following his return to Maidstone in October 1852 (and promotion to commander of the regiment's troop there), he published his first book, The Training of Cavalry Remount Horses: A New System, through Parker, Furnivall & Parker. Dedicated to Berkeley, the book was highly specialised and intended for practical use, aimed specifically at cavalry officers rather than equestrians generally.

The reaction to the book was limited, partly because of its specialised nature. His second book, Cavalry: Its History and Tactics, covered cavalry theory more widely and made a series of recommendations, including the use of carbines on foot rather than from the saddle, and substantial improvements to the cavalry saddle itself. The existing saddle, in use since 1796, was considered too high, restricting the use of a rider's lower legs, leading to instability. Accordingly, he designed a new saddle, with the assistance of the saddler sergeant at Maidstone depot, which focused on reducing rubbing against the horse, improved comfort and weighed less than the existing design. The resulting saddle was tested in April 1853, with attendance by the Duke of Cambridge, inspector general of cavalry. The reaction was positive, and the army commissioned it as a new model for the cavalry, known as the Universal Wood Arch Pattern design, but informally referred to as "Nolan's saddle".

Cavalry: Its History and Tactics received a much warmer reception than Training, with the Illustrated London News praising his knowledge and enthusiasm while recommending it for civilians as well as the military. Another review in The Times was also approving. Over the next few decades it continued to be well received, and was seen as "an important, even ground-breaking, work". The book gave him substantial prominence, both in Britain and the United States. It was also discussed in India, where it was praised as "the manual for a cavalry officer who would understand his profession and reflect honour upon it". A copy was sent to Bonneau du Martray of the French Imperial Staff by Major-General Wetherall of the British staff; Du Martray, having read the book, translated the entire work as Histoire et Tactique de la Cavalerie.

== Crimean War ==
=== Remount mission ===
With the Crimean War fast approaching, the British Army needed some way of obtaining cavalry horses in Turkey. One method was simply to ship horses from Britain, but this was time-consuming and expensive, and would result in a large number dying. Alternatively, horses could be bought in the Middle East, if suitable ones could be identified. The Duke of Newcastle, Secretary of State for War, needed an experienced cavalry officer to undertake such a search. With Nolan's new-found reputation he was a logical choice, and Newcastle had him struck off from the 15th Hussars and made aide-de-camp to General Richard Airey, backdated to 17 March 1854. Issued with a "special service" passport, he departed to Constantinople, meeting the steamship Thabor at Marseilles.

After arriving in Turkey he met with Skene, the British Vice-Consul, who had him introduced to Omar Pasha and invited to view the Turkish regiments. Nolan was not particularly impressed by them, judging the irregulars incapable of withstanding a Russian cavalry charge and finding the horses too small. He ordered 250 of them anyway, finding them appropriate for the British artillery if not for the cavalry. His report to Somerset (now Baron Raglan, and commander of the British forces in Turkey) included a proposal for a trip to Syria, where he claimed the horses were more appropriate. This proposal was eventually agreed to, and he went to İskenderun on 9 May. When they arrived they discovered that Turkish officials had already bought most of the army horses in northern Syria, and so they continued on to Beirut and then Damascus. Even there, they failed to find horses of sufficient quality, and so they left the city on 21 May in hopes of making contact with the Bedouin. They left with a train of 292 horses, mostly bought from the 'Anizzah, and were met at Beirut by the steamship Trent and transported back to Turkey.

=== Staff officer ===
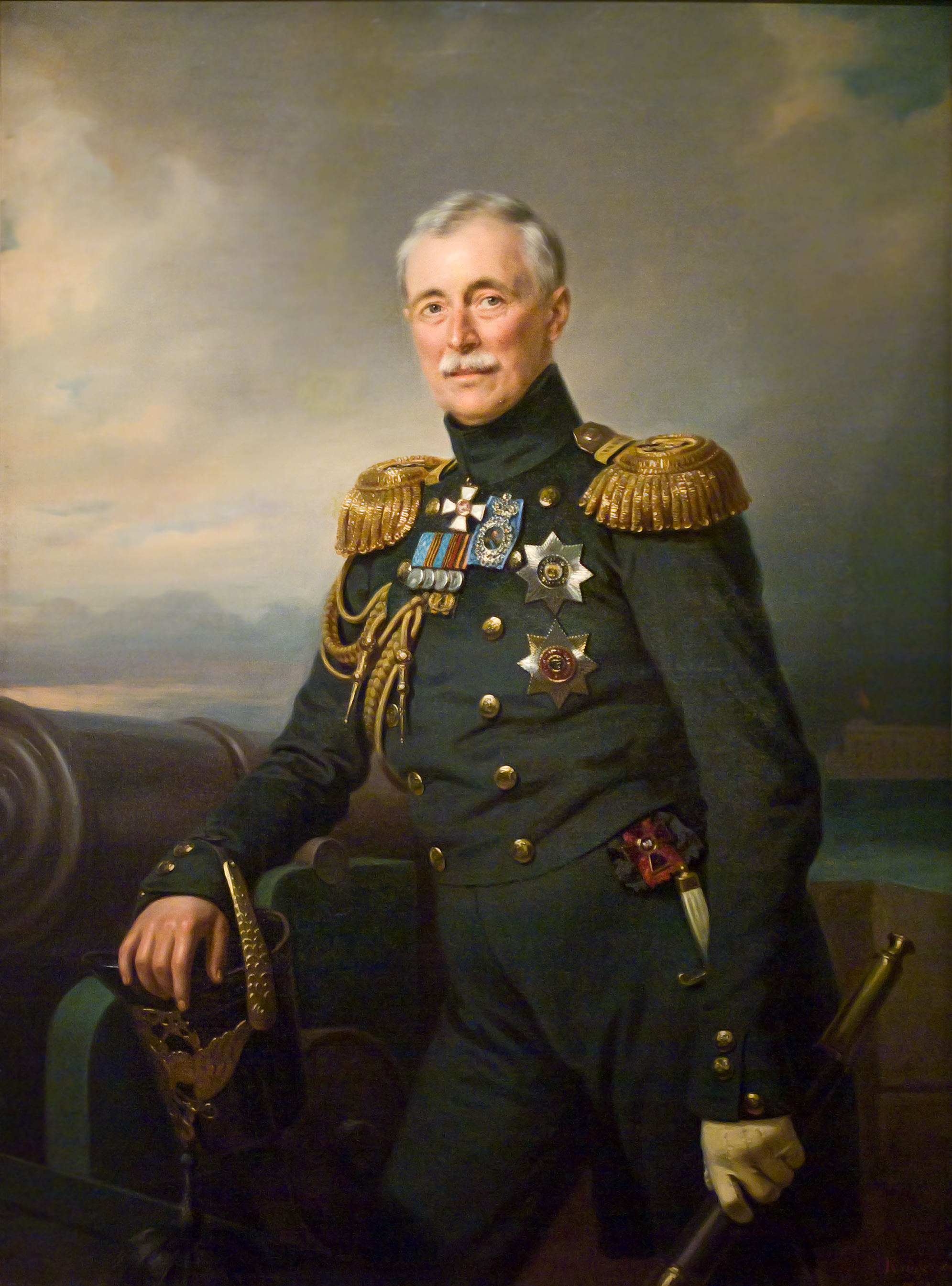
Prince Menshikov, Russian commander at the Battles of Alma and Balaclava

Nolan returned to the British forces to join the Light Division at Devna as aide-de-camp to Airey. The Royal Navy had control over the Black Sea, and with a Russian treaty with Turkey and Austria, the enemy forces were withdrawing from Eastern Europe. Despite this favourable outcome, the British government wished to negotiate with the Russians from a strong position. The decision was taken to invade the Crimea itself, with the objective of destroying or capturing the Russian naval base at Sevastopol. Raglan personally considered this unrealistic – British forces knew little about the region, the port's defences, or the strength of the Russian military, with estimates of troop numbers varying between 45,000 and 140,000. It was also quite a distance away, causing logistical difficulties.

With the Crimea identified as the target, Nolan and his fellow staff officers had to plan the assault, which eventually included 30,000 infantry, 1,240 cavalry and 54 guns, along with 24,000 French soldiers and 70 of their guns. The cavalry alone required 3,379 horses, and with such a small number of ships available the Heavy Brigade would be part of a second wave – until it arrived, the Light Brigade would be relied on as the sole unit of cavalry. The force departed for the Crimea on 2 September 1854, and began landing at Kalamita Bay, 35 miles north of Sevastopol itself. Airey (now Quartermaster-General) had the light cavalry engage in reconnaissance and screening while the rest of the force moved off the transports, and they were fully ashore by the 18th. On the 19th, they began marching to Sevastopol – still without the Heavy Brigade.

The force reached the Bulganak River that day, where skirmishers found a force of Cossacks and Russian infantry, with a light battery of artillery. The infantry and artillery had been hidden in a dip in the terrain while the British formed up, and their placement put the British cavalry in heavy danger. Raglan decided to withdraw, and sent a troop forward to cover the retreat; this body's confidence deceived the Russians into thinking that there was a larger British force than there was, and they failed to pursue the retreating cavalry. A day later, the British force, together with the French under General St Arnaud, defeated the Russians at the Battle of Alma. Nolan spent the battle as a liaison due to his fluent French, and was often galloping between the two allied armies. They resumed marching on 26 September and entered the plains of Balaclava, near Sevastopol.

=== Balaclava ===
The British camp in Balaclava was on a plateau, with two approaches – the South and North valleys – and a small hill, known as the Causeway Heights, between them. At Balaclava, the force waited for supplies while the allied ships bombarded the forts surrounding Sevastopol, starting on 17 October. The forts proved to be particularly strong, but some damage was caused and Admiral Kornilov killed. From then on, time and time again, the allied navy would bombard the forts, causing damage, which the Russians would then repair each night. While the allied armies waited to strengthen their positions and increase their resources, Prince Menshikov, commander of the Russian forces, had a desire to provide a victory to the Tsar following his defeat at Alma. He formed a plan to cut the British Army off from the harbour at Balaclava, with a secondary objective of capturing the harbour itself. The Russian forces assembled on 24 October, and attacked at around 7am on the 25th. General Gribbe covered the Russian left flank, with Semiakin, Levoutsky and Scudery on his right: General Ryzhov waited behind them, prepared to support any individual force that came under trouble. The Turkish forces in the first redoubts were quickly overwhelmed and forced to flee.

At 8am Raglan ordered the Heavy and Light cavalry brigades, under Lord Lucan, to move into line with the second set of Turkish-occupied redoubts. The order confused and infuriated Lucan – there was only one set of redoubts that had been occupied by the Turks, and it was now abandoned. Doing so also meant leaving the Turks and 550 British infantry to meet the Russian charge alone, without any cavalry support. Despite Raglan's "lackadaisical wording", Lucan interpreted the order (correctly) to require him to place the Light Brigade at the mouth of the North Valley to Balaclava, a position that left the cavalry dangerously exposed: because of the terrain, they would not be able to see advancing Russian troops until they were less than 50 feet away. As Raglan watched the cavalry form up at the mouth of the North Valley, 30 minutes after giving the order, he changed his mind and had them returned to their original position.

At the same time, Raglan wished to reinforce the Turks and British infantry, and ordered Lucan to detach four of the five Heavy Brigade cavalry regiments and send them to the defensive line. This further angered Lucan, since splitting the force in half merely reduced the cavalry's overall effectiveness, but he again complied. The result was that the first fork of the Russian cavalry attack encountered The Thin Red Line and were driven off, while the second fork, crossing the heights above the plain, encountered four regiments of the Heavy Brigade. The Russians – with between 1,500 and 2,000 men – were initially surprised to see the 800 British cavalry approaching, allowing Scarlett, the commander of the Heavy Brigades, to charge the Russians uphill. By this point Lucan had left Lord Cardigan in charge of the Light Brigade and raced over to the Heavies, later claiming that his duty trumpeter had ordered the British charge, which eventually forced the Russians to flee.

=== The Light Brigade ===
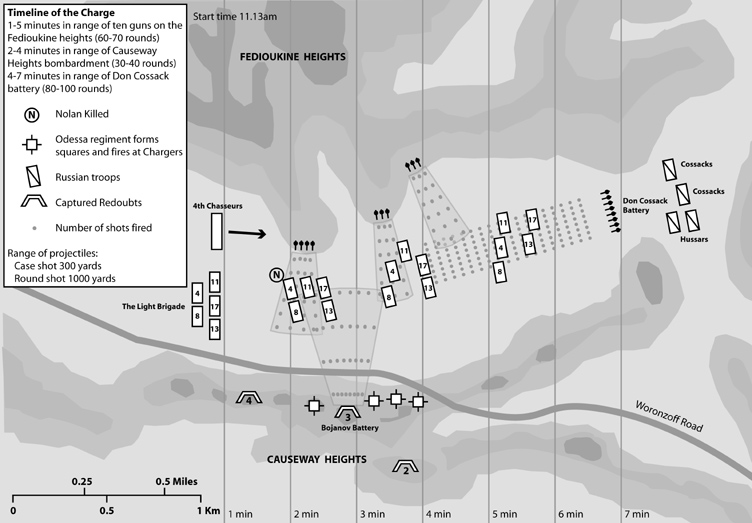
The timeline of the Charge

When Lucan left the Light Brigade idling on the plateau, he instructed Cardigan to defend the position against attack. Cardigan interpreted this to mean that he should not leave the plateau, and the Brigade remained mostly immobile while the Heavy Brigade engaged the Russian cavalry (over the objection of some of the Light Brigade's officers). This prevented the British cavalry from adequately pursuing the Russians, and no attacks were mounted down the North Valley through which they had retreated. Due to the failure of their attack, the Russians chose not to advance further, leading to Raglan deciding to attempt to retake the captured Turkish fortifications using the Light and Heavy brigades with two divisions of infantry. Although the 1st Division advanced swiftly, the 4th Division was deliberately slow, making Raglan increasingly impatient. He dispatched an aide to Lucan ordering that "Cavalry to advance and take advantage of any opportunity to recover the heights. They will be supported by the infantry which have been ordered to advance on two fronts". Lucan interpreted this to mean he should await the infantry support before attacking.

About 40 minutes later, with the infantry still having not arrived, Raglan's staff officers spotted Russian artillery teams approaching the fortifications with equipment to remove captured guns. To avoid the guns being taken, Raglan dispatched Nolan to carry a message to Lucan that read:

Lord Raglan wishes the cavalry to advance rapidly to the front, and try to prevent the enemy carrying away the guns. Troop of horse-artillery may accompany. French cavalry is on your left. Immediate.

As Nolan rode towards Lucan's position, Raglan shouted that he should "Tell Lord Lucan the cavalry is to attack immediately"; his fourth order. The Russian forces included the Don Cossack field artillery battery, containing between eight and twelve guns, drawn up at the bottom of the North Valley, with regiments of cavalry waiting behind it. Nolan carried the message to Lucan; when Lucan asked what guns were referred to, Nolan is said to have indicated, by a wide sweep of his arm, not the Causeway redoubts but the Don Cossack battery in the North Valley, around a mile away. After a brief debate, Lucan ordered the Light Brigade forward. Cardigan claimed that Lucan had ordered him to attack without quarter given, despite him pointing out the Russian artillery; Lucan, on the other hand, claimed he told Cardigan to retire from battle "if no opportunity to take his objective presented itself".

Regardless, the Brigade drew swords and was ordered by Cardigan to advance down the valley. Nolan had explicitly asked to join the Brigade for the fight, and was allowed to.

==== The Charge ====
The Light Brigade set off down the valley with Cardigan out in front, riding Ronald, leading the charge. Almost at once Nolan was seen to rush across the front, passing in front of Cardigan. It may be that he then realised the charge was aimed at the wrong target, and was attempting to stop or turn the brigade, but the Russian guns opened fire, and an artillery shell splinter mortally wounded Nolan in the chest. As the cavalry continued on its course, Nolan's horse carried him back almost to the Brigade's starting point before he finally fell from the saddle, dead. Captain Godfrey Morgan (subsequently 1st Viscount Tredegar), who was close by and saw what happened, later recounted:

The first shell burst in the air about 100 yards in front of us. The next one dropped in front of Nolan's horse and exploded on touching the ground. He uttered a wild yell as his horse turned round, and, with his arms extended, the reins dropped on the animal's neck, he trotted towards us, but in a few yards dropped dead off his horse. I do not imagine that anybody except those in the front line of the 17th Lancers (13th Light Dragoons) saw what had happened.

We went on. When we got about two or three hundred yards the battery of the Russian Horse Artillery opened fire. I do not recollect hearing a word from anybody as we gradually broke from a trot to a canter, though the noise of the striking of men and horses by grape and round shot was deafening, while the dust and gravel struck up by the round shot that fell short was almost blinding, and irritated my horse so that I could scarcely hold him at all. But as we came nearer I could see plainly enough, especially when I was about a hundred yards from the guns. I appeared to be riding straight on to the muzzle of one of the guns, and I distinctly saw the gunner apply his fuse. I shut my eyes then, for I thought that settled the question as far as I was concerned. But the shot just missed me and struck the man on my right full in the chest.

In another minute I was on the gun and the leading Russian's grey horse, shot, I suppose, with a pistol by somebody on my right, fell across my horse, dragging it over with him and pinning me in between the gun and himself. A Russian gunner on foot at once covered me with his carbine. He was just within reach of my sword, and I struck him across his neck. The blow did not do much harm, but it disconcerted his aim. At the same time a mounted gunner struck my horse on the forehead with his sabre. Spurring "Sir Briggs," he half jumped, half blundered, over the fallen horses, and then for a short time bolted with me. I only remember finding myself alone among the Russians trying to get out as best I could. This, by some chance, I did, in spite of the attempts of the Russians to cut me down.

Russian artillery continued to fire on the Light Brigade. As Lucan advanced after them with the Heavy Brigade, he saw the Light Brigade being overwhelmed by the Russian artillery and ordered the Heavies back, saying that "They have sacrificed the Light Brigade; they shall not the Heavy, if I can help it". Lucan's subsequent explanation was that he saw no point in having a second brigade mown down, and he was best positioned where he was to render assistance to Light Brigade survivors returning from the charge. The French light cavalry, the Chasseurs d'Afrique, was more effective in that it cleared the Fedyukhin Heights of the two half batteries of guns, two infantry battalions, and Cossacks to ensure the Light Brigade would not be hit by fire from that flank, and it later provided cover for the remaining elements of the Light Brigade as they withdrew.

The remainder of the Light Brigade eventually reached the Russian artillery, wreaking havoc on the fleeing gunners, before pursuing the Russian cavalry behind the artillery down the remainder of the valley. Despite being outnumbered five to one, the British cavalry who pursued the Russians managed to disrupt the enemy for some time before being killed or captured. Of the cavalry who had stayed with the abandoned artillery guns, 60 or 70 were collected by George Paget, who retired back to the British lines despite Russian cavalry harrying them. The result was 110 dead, 130 wounded, and 58 missing or captured – 40 per cent losses in an action that lasted 20 minutes.

Despite the heavy losses amongst the men he led, Lord Cardigan survived the battle. Although stories circulated afterwards that he was not actually present, he led the charge from the front and, never looking back, did not see what was happening to the troops behind him. He reached the Russian guns, took part in the fight, and then returned alone up the valley without bothering to rally or even find out what had happened to the survivors. He afterwards said all he could think about was his rage against Nolan, who he thought had tried to take over the leadership of the charge from him. After riding back up the valley, he considered he had done all that he could and then, with total indifference, left the field and went on board his yacht in Balaclava harbour, where he ate a champagne dinner.

In December 2016, it was reported that a letter was found in the British Library, written by Lieutenant Frederick Maxse, who was on Lord Raglan's staff at Balaclava, stating that Lord Raglan had sent an order for the Light Brigade to "follow the enemy and try to prevent the enemy from carrying away the guns"; those guns were some British artillery guns which were at risk. Raglan having sent Nolan to give the order, Nolan, instead of passing on the order verbatim complete as given, passed it on to Lord Lucan orally as "There, my lord, is your enemy! There are your guns!", and added the word "attack", when Raglan had intended merely a show of force. Nolan's version of the order and accompanying gesture were misunderstood, causing the disaster. Maxse's letter said that Nolan was annoyed at how little the Light Brigade had done previously, and that Nolan was angry against Lord Lucan. Nigel Kingscote (another of Raglan's staff officers) agreed that the fault was Nolan's, and said that Nolan, if he had lived, would have been "broke by court martial".

== Legacy ==
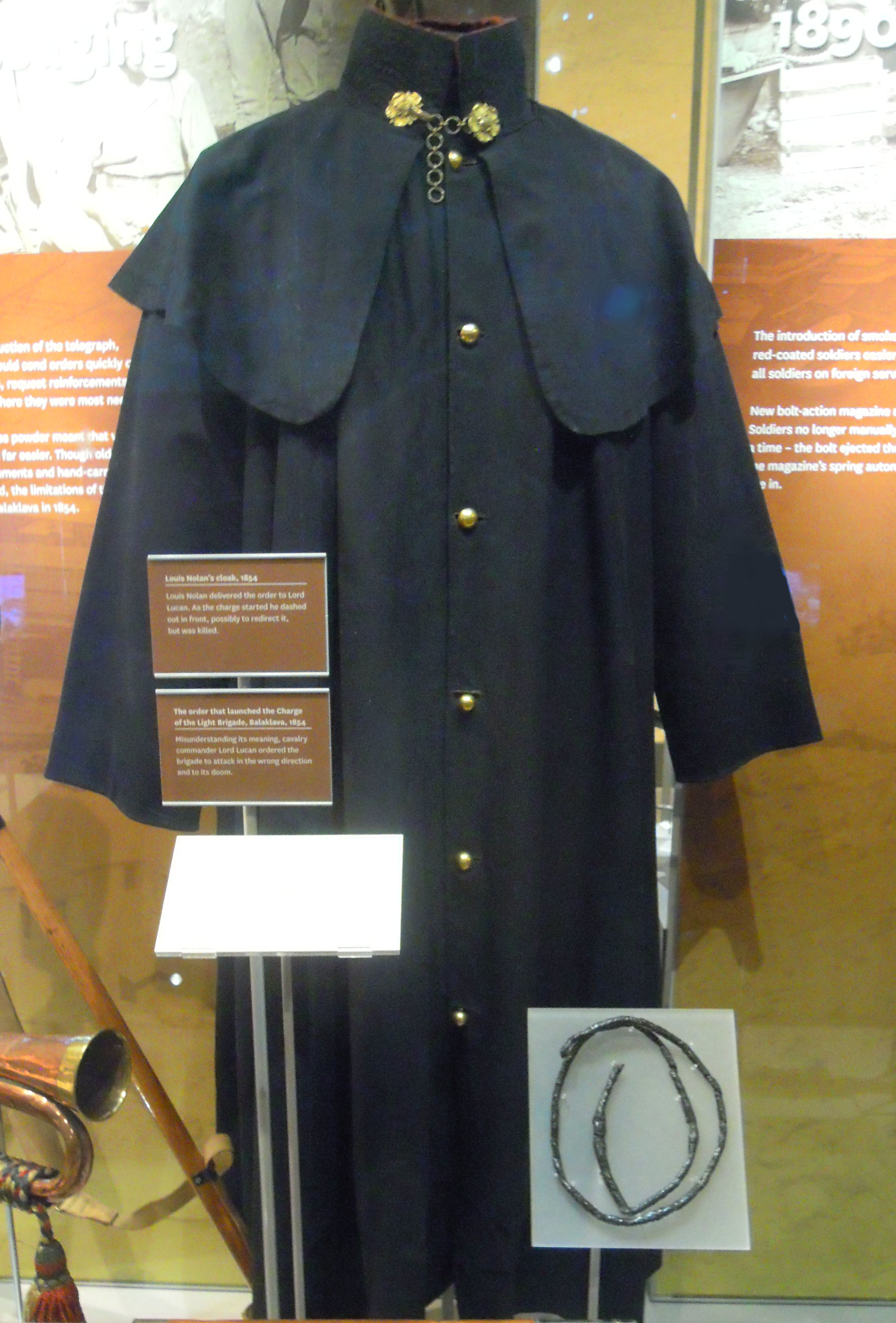
A cloak belonging to Nolan displayed in the National Army Museum. Nolan had lent his cloak to William Russell before the charge.

At the time of his death, Nolan was the last male member of his family. His cousins, the Neylans, adopted his surname and have carried his name on since then in the form of Nolan-Neylan. Some friends had a plaque erected in his memory at Holy Trinity Church in Maidstone, although his body remained in the Crimea. Most of his possessions were given to Colonel Key, including the copyright on Cavalry: Its History and Tactics, his house in London and his interests in the Adelphi Estate in Tobago.

The Charge itself and the tragedy that resulted was blamed on both Lucan and Nolan by William Howard Russell – Nolan, for misunderstanding the order and issuing a confusing message, and Lucan, for not properly keeping an eye on the terrain. Raglan himself primarily blamed Lucan, who was infuriated by this and wrote a letter to Horse Guards disputing Raglan's claim. This was too much for Viscount Hardinge, the Commander-in-Chief of the Forces, who had Lucan resign his command and return to Britain. With Hardinge unwilling to give him a court martial, Lucan wrote a pamphlet titled A Vindication of the Earl of Lucan from Lord Raglan's Reflections and a series of letters to The Times that revealed Raglan's order to have been highly ambiguous and "not the kind of dispatch required by an officer on the battlefield". At the same time, Nolan's method of delivery had been imperious, and he had insisted the urgency of the attack – something clear in Raglan's verbal order to him, but not in the written order. Public opinion became divided; people both attacked Nolan and rallied to his defence. The major newspapers, at least, maintained that with Nolan's status as a mere messenger it was inconceivable that he alone could have destroyed the Light Brigade without failings by Lucan. Lord Cardigan defended Nolan by saying the Captain "did not have the least idea of the mistake which was about to be perpetrated." Within the Crimea, however, the majority "roundly damned" Nolan. The Charge was soon overshadowed by other scandalous and bloody military failures such as the continued failure of the siege of Sevastopol.

Terry Brighton writes in Hell Riders that "in the 150 years since the charge historians have generally agreed that the blunder was indeed Nolan's. Most argue that he misunderstood the order, and when asked by Lord Lucan what Raglan intended by it pointed towards the wrong enemy guns and sent the Light Brigade to its destruction. In recent years it has even been suggested that he deliberately misled Lucan about which guns were to be attacked". Brighton himself distributes the blame more widely, holding that Raglan, Lucan and Nolan were at fault, but that the vast majority of the blame lies with Lucan. David Buttery, in Messenger of Death, agrees that the blame was at least partially Lucan's for failing to conduct adequate reconnaissance.

Nolan was played by David Hemmings in the 1968 film The Charge of the Light Brigade. In the film Nolan is portrayed as a haughty, glory-hungry officer, but also a "symbol of youth, energy and professionalism ... desperate ... to reform the army". A more sympathetic, though still impetuous, portrayal of Nolan was created by George MacDonald Fraser in his picaresque novel of 1973, Flashman At The Charge. A totally fictitious "Major Geoffrey Vickers", standing in for Nolan but with utterly different motives in ordering the charge, was played by Errol Flynn in the 1936 film, The Charge of the Light Brigade.

== Bibliography ==
- Barrett, Charles (1911). History of the XIII. Hussars. Vol. 1. Edinburgh: William Blackwood.
- Brighton, Terry (2005). Hell Riders. Penguin Military History. ISBN 0-14-101831-3.
- Buttery, David (2008). Messenger of Death: Captain Nolan and the Charge of the Light Brigade. Pen & Sword. ISBN 978-1-84415-756-3.
- Connelly, Mark (2003). The Charge of the Light Brigade. The British Film Guide. Vol. 5. London: I. B. Taurus. ISBN 1-86064-612-3.
- Moyse-Bartlett, Hubert (1971). Louis Edward Nolan and his influence on the British Cavalry. Leo Cooper Ltd. ISBN 0-85052-072-X.
- Sweetman, John (2001). The Crimean War: 1854–1856. Osprey Publishing. ISBN 978-1-84176-186-2.
- Woodham-Smith, Cecil (2000). The Reason Why: The Story of the Fatal Charge of the Light Brigade. Penguin Books. ISBN 0-14-139031-X.
