= Harry Flashman =

- The Flashman Papers character
- Cover illustration of Flashman by Gino D'Achille (2005 printing)
- First appearance: "Tom Brown's School Days"
- Last appearance: "Flashman on the March"
- Created by: Thomas Hughes
- Portrayed by: Malcolm McDowell (Royal Flash)

In-universe information
- Full name: Harry Paget Flashman
- Gender: Male
- Family: Henry Buckley Flashman (father); Lady Alicia Paget (mother)
- Spouses: Elspeth Morrison; Irma, Grand Duchess of Strackenz; Susie Willinck
- Relatives: Jack Flashman (great-grandfather)
- Nationality: English

Sir Harry Paget Flashman is a fictional character created by Thomas Hughes in the semi-autobiographical Tom Brown's School Days (1857) and later developed by George MacDonald Fraser. Harry Flashman appears in a series of 12 of Fraser's books, collectively known as The Flashman Papers, with covers illustrated by Arthur Barbosa and Gino D'Achille. Flashman was played by Malcolm McDowell in the Richard Lester 1975 film Royal Flash.

In Tom Brown's School Days (1857), Flashman is portrayed as a notorious Rugby School bully who persecutes Tom Brown and is finally expelled for drunkenness, at which point he simply disappears. Fraser decided to write the story of Flashman's later life, in which the school bully would be identified as an "illustrious Victorian soldier", experiencing many of the 19th-century wars and adventures of the British Empire and rising to high rank in the British Army, to be acclaimed as a great warrior, while still remaining "a scoundrel, a liar, a cheat, a thief, a coward—and, oh yes, a toady."

In the papers—which are purported to have been written by Flashman and discovered only after his death—he describes his own dishonourable conduct with complete candour. Fraser's Flashman is an antihero who often runs away from danger. Nevertheless, through a combination of luck and cunning, he usually ends each volume acclaimed as a hero.

== Flashman's origins ==
Fraser gave Flashman a lifespan from 1822 to 1915 and a birth-date of 5 May. He also provided Flashman's first and middle names, as Hughes's novel had given Flashman only one, using the names to make an ironic allusion to Henry Paget, 1st Marquess of Anglesey. Paget was one of the heroes of Waterloo, who cuckolded the Duke of Wellington's brother Henry Wellesley and later—in one of the period's more celebrated scandals—married Lady Anglesey, after Wellesley had divorced her for adultery.

In Flashman, Flashman says that his great-grandfather, Jack Flashman, made the family fortune in America, trading in rum, slaves and "piracy too, I shouldn't wonder". Despite their wealth, the Flashmans "were never the thing"; Flashman quotes the diarist Henry Greville's comment that "the coarse streak showed through, generation after generation, like dung beneath a rosebush". Harry Flashman's equally fictional father, Henry Buckley Flashman, appears in Black Ajax (1997).

Buckley, a bold young officer in the British cavalry, is said to have been wounded in action at Talavera in 1809, and then to have gained access to "society" by sponsoring bare-knuckle boxer Tom Molineaux, the first black man to contend for a championship. The character subsequently marries Flashman's mother Lady Alicia Paget, a fictional relation of the real Marquess of Anglesey. Buckley, it is related, also served as a Member of Parliament (MP) but was "sent to the knacker's yard at Reform". Beside politics, the older Flashman character has interests including drinking, fox hunting (riding to hounds), and women.

== Character ==
Flashman is a large man, six feet two inches (1.88 m) tall and close to 13 stone (about 180 pounds or 82 kg). In Flashman and the Tiger, he mentions that one of his grandchildren has black hair and eyes, resembling him in his younger years. His dark colouring frequently enabled him to pass, in disguise, for a Pashtun. He claims only three natural talents: horsemanship, facility with foreign languages, and fornication. He becomes an expert cricket-bowler, but only through hard effort. He needed sporting credit at Rugby School, and feared to play rugby football. He can display a winning personality when he wants to, and is very skilled at flattering those more important than himself without appearing servile.

As he admits in the Papers, Flashman is a coward, who will flee from danger if there is any way to do so, and has on some occasions collapsed in funk. He has one great advantage in concealing this weakness: when he is frightened, his face turns red, rather than white, so that observers think he is excited, enraged, or exuberant—as a hero ought to be.

After his expulsion from Rugby School for drunkenness, the young Flashman looks for an easy life. He has his wealthy father buy him an officer's commission in the fashionable 11th Regiment of Light Dragoons. The 11th, commanded by Lord Cardigan, later involved in the Charge of the Light Brigade, has just returned from India and are not likely to be posted abroad soon. Flashman throws himself into the social life that the 11th offered and becomes a leading light of Canterbury society. In 1840, the regiment is converted to Hussars with an elegant blue and crimson uniform, which assists Flashman in attracting female attention for the remainder of his military career.

A duel with another officer over a French courtesan leads to his being temporarily stationed in Paisley, Scotland. There he meets and deflowers Elspeth Morrison, daughter of a wealthy textile manufacturer, whom he has to marry in a "shotgun wedding" under threat of a horsewhipping by her uncle. But marriage to the daughter of a mere businessman forces his transferral from the snobbish 11th Hussars. He is sent to India to make a career in the army of the East India Company. Unfortunately, his language talent and his habit of flattery bring him to the attention of the Governor-General. The Governor does him the very much unwanted favour of assigning him as aide to General Elphinstone in Afghanistan.

Flashman survives the ensuing retreat from Kabul, the worst British military debacle of Victoria's reign, by a mixture of sheer luck and unstinting cowardice. He becomes an unwitting hero: the defender of Piper's Fort, where he is the only surviving white man, and is found by the relieving troops clutching the flag and surrounded by enemy dead. Of course, Flashman had arrived at the fort by accident, collapsed in terror rather than fighting, been forced to stand and show fight by his subordinate, and is 'rumbled' for a complete coward. He had been trying to surrender the colours, not defend them. Happily for him, all inconvenient witnesses had been killed.

This incident sets the tone for Flashman's life. Over the following 60 years or so, he is involved in many of the major military conflicts of the 19th century—always in spite of his best efforts to evade his duty. He is often selected for especially dangerous jobs because of his heroic reputation. He meets many famous people, and survives some of the worst military disasters of the period (the First Anglo-Afghan War, the Charge of the Light Brigade, the Siege of Cawnpore, the Battle of the Little Bighorn, and the Battle of Isandlwana), always coming out with more heroic laurels. The date of his last adventure seems to have been around 1900, being involved in the Boxer Rebellion with the US Marines. He dies in 1915.

Despite his admitted cowardice, Flashman is a dab hand at fighting when he has to. Though he dodges danger as much as he can, and runs away when no one is watching, after the Piper's Fort incident, he usually controls his fear and often performs bravely. Almost every book contains one or more incidents where Flashman has to fight or perform some other daring action, and he holds up long enough to complete it. For instance, he is ordered to accompany the Light Brigade on its famous charge and rides all the way to the Russian guns. However, most of these acts of 'bravery' are performed only when he has absolutely no choice and to do anything else would result in his being exposed as a coward, and losing his respected status in society, or being shot for desertion. When he can act like a coward with impunity, he invariably does.

Flashman surrenders to fear in front of witnesses only a few times, and is never caught out again. During the siege of Piper's Fort, in the first novel, Flashman cowers weeping in his bed at the start of the final assault; the only witness to this dies before relief comes. He breaks down while accompanying Rajah Brooke during a battle with pirates, but the noise drowns out his blubbering, and he recovers enough to command a storming party of sailors, placing himself right in the middle of the party, to avoid stray bullets. After the Charge of the Light Brigade, he flees in panic from the fighting in the battery—but mistakenly charges into an entire Russian regiment, adding to his heroic image.

In spite of his numerous character flaws, Flashman is represented as being a perceptive observer of his times ("I saw further than most in some ways"). In its obituary of George MacDonald Fraser, The Economist commented that realistic sharp-sightedness ("if not much else") was an attribute Flashman shared with his creator.

== Relationships ==
Flashman, an insatiable lecher, has sex with many different women over the course of his fictional adventures. His size, good looks, winning manner, and especially his splendid cavalry-style whiskers win over women from low to high, and his dalliances include famous ladies, along with numerous prostitutes.

In Flashman and the Great Game, about halfway through his life, he counted up his sexual conquests while languishing in a dungeon at Gwalior, "not counting return engagements", reaching a total of 478 up to that date, similar—albeit not equal—to the tally made by Mozart's Don Giovanni in the famous aria of Giovanni's henchman, Leporello. Passages in Royal Flash, Flashman and the Mountain of Light, Flashman and the Dragon, Flashman and the Redskins, and Flashman and the Angel of the Lord suggest that Flashman was well endowed.

He was a vigorous and exciting, if sometimes selfish and rapacious lover, and some of his partners became quite fond of him—though by his own admission, others tried to kill him afterwards. The most memorable of these was Cleonie, a prostitute Flashman sold into slavery in Flashman and the Redskins. He was not above forcing himself on a partner by blackmail (e.g., Phoebe Carpenter in Flashman and the Dragon), and at least twice raped women (Narreeman, an Afghan dancing girl in Flashman, and an unnamed harem girl in Flashman's Lady).

Flashman's stories are dominated by his numerous amorous encounters. Several of them are with prominent historical personages. These women are sometimes window dressing, sometimes pivotal characters in the unpredictable twists and turns of the books. Historical women Flashman bedded included:

- Lola Montez (Marie Dolores Eliza Rosanna Gilbert James; Royal Flash).
- Jind Kaur, Dowager Maharani of Punjab (Flashman and the Mountain of Light).
- Lillie Langtry, actress and mistress of Edward VII (Flashman and the Tiger)
- Daisy Brooke, socialite and mistress of Edward VII (Flashman and the Tiger)
- Mangla, maid and confidant to Jind Kaur (Flashman and the Mountain of Light).
- Masteeat, Queen of the Wollo Gallas (Flashman on the March).
- Queen Ranavalona I of Madagascar (Flashman's Lady).
- The Silk One (aka Ko Dali's daughter), consort of Yakub Beg (Flashman at the Charge).
- Yehonala, Imperial Chinese concubine, later the Empress Dowager Cixi (Flashman and the Dragon).
- Lakshmibai, (Possibly) Rani of Jhansi and leader of the Indian Mutiny (Flashman in the Great Game).

He also lusted after (but never bedded):

- Fanny Duberly, a famous army wife (Flash for Freedom!).
- Angela Burdett-Coutts, who became the richest woman in England in her twenties. She nearly dislocated his thumb repelling a "friendly grope" at a house-party (Flashman's Lady).
- Florence Nightingale, a famous nurse and social reformer (Flashman in the Great Game).
- Agnes Salm-Salm, the American wife of German Prince Felix Salm-Salm, an associate in his doomed attempts to save Maximilian I of Mexico (Flashman on the March).

His fictional amours included:

- Judy Parsons, his father's mistress (Flashman). After a single bedding to satisfy joint lust, she and Flashman achieve a state of mutual dislike.
- Josette, mistress of Captain Bernier of the 11th Light Dragoons (Flashman).
- Elspeth Rennie Morrison, his wife.
- Fetnab, a dancing girl Flashy bought in Calcutta (Flashman) to teach him Hindustani, Hindi culture and purportedly ninety-seven ways of love making. Sold to a major in the artillery when Flashman is posted to Afghanistan.
- Mrs Betty Parker, wife of an officer of Bengal Light Cavalry (Flashman; unconsummated). Cited by Flashman as an example of the "inadequacies of education given to young Englishwomen" in the Victorian era.
- Baroness Pechmann, a Bavarian noblewoman (Royal Flash).
- Irma, Grand Duchess of Strackenz (Royal Flash). For involved political reasons Flashman marries her, in the guise of a Danish prince. After an unpromising start the cold and highly-strung Duchess becomes physically infatuated with him. Decades later she pays an official visit to Queen Victoria. Flashman, by now an ageing courtier, observes his erstwhile royal spouse from a safe distance.
- An-yat-heh, an undercover agent of Harry Smith Parkes (Flashman and the Dragon).
- Aphrodite, one of Miss Susie's "gels" (Flashman and the Redskins).
- Cassy, an escaped slave who accompanied Flashman up the Mississippi (Flash for Freedom!).
- Caprice, a French intelligence agent (Flashman and the Tiger)
- Lady Geraldine (Flashman and the Dragon, mentioned)
- Gertrude, niece of Admiral Tegetthoff (Flashman on the March).
- Princess "Kralta", European princess and agent of Otto von Bismarck (Flashman and the Tiger)
- Cleonie Grouard (aka Mrs Arthur B. Candy), one of "Miss Susie's gels" (Flashman and the Redskins). With her he had a son, Frank Grouard.
- Mrs Leo Lade, mistress of a violently jealous duke (Flashman's Lady).
- "Lady Caroline Lamb", a slave on board the slaver Balliol College (Flash for Freedom!).
- Mrs Leslie, an unattached woman in the Meerut garrison (Flashman in the Great Game).
- Mrs Madison (Flashman and the Mountain of Light).
- Malee, a servant of Uliba-Wark (Flashman on the March).
- Annette Mandeville, a Mississippi planter's wife (Flash for Freedom! and again in Flashman and the Angel of the Lord).
- Penny/Jenny, a steamboat girl (Flash for Freedom!).
- Lady Plunkett, wife of a colonial judge (not quite consummated: Flashman and the Angel of the Lord).
- Hannah Poppelwell, agent of a Southern slaveholders' conspiracy (Flashman and the Angel of the Lord).
- Sara (Aunt Sara), sister-in-law of Count Pencherjevsky (Flashman at the Charge). Shares violent love-making with Flashman in a Russian steam-bath. Believed to be victim of a subsequent serf rising.
- Sonsee-Array (Takes-Away-Clouds-Woman), an Apache savage 'princess', daughter of Mangas Coloradas and Flashman's fourth wife (Flashman and the Redskins).
- Miranda Spring, daughter of John Charity Spring (Flashman and the Angel of the Lord).
- Szu-Zhan, a six-foot-eight Chinese bandit leader (Flashman and the Dragon).
- Uliba-Wark, an Abyssinian chieftainess and warrior (Flashman on the March).
- Valentina (Valla), married daughter of Russian nobleman and Cossack colonel Count Pencherjevsky (Flashman at the Charge). She has an affair with Flashman at her father's instigation. While fleeing with Valla from a rebellion by Pencherjevsky's serfs, Flashman attempts to escape pursuit by throwing her into the snow from a troika.
- White Tigress and Honey-and-Milk, two concubines of the Chinese merchant Whampoa (Flashman's Lady).
- Susie Willinck (aka "Miss Susie"), New Orleans madam and Flashman's third wife (Flash for Freedom! and Flashman and the Redskins).
- Madame Sabba, his "guide" at the Temple of Heaven, actually the lure in a robbery scheme (Flashman's Lady, unconsummated).
- Mam'selle Bomfomtalbellilaba, a guest at one of Ranavalona I of Madagascar's parties (Flashman's Lady, unconsummated).
- Hermia, an African-American slave (Flash for Freedom!).
- Phoebe Carpenter, the wife of a British clergyman in China (Flashman and the Dragon, unconsummated)

As well as bedding more or less any lass available, he married whenever it was politic to do so. During a posting to Scotland, he was forced to marry Elspeth to avoid "pistols for two with her fire-breathing uncle". He is still married to her decades later when writing the memoirs, though that does not stop him pursuing others. Nor does it prevent marrying them when his safety seems to require it; he marries Duchess Irma in Royal Flash and in Flashman and the Redskins he marries Susie Willnick as they escape New Orleans, and Sonsee-Array a few months later.

He was also once reminded of a woman that Elspeth claimed he flirted with named Kitty Stevens, though Flashman was unable to remember her.

He had a special penchant for royal ladies, and noted that his favourite amours, apart from his wife, were Lakshmibai, Ci Xi, and Lola Montez: "a Queen, an Empress, and the foremost courtesan of her time: I dare say I'm just a snob." He also noted that, while civilised women were more than ordinarily partial to him, his most ardent admirers were among the savage of the species: "Elspeth, of course, is Scottish." And for all his raking, it was always Elspeth to whom he returned and who remained ultimately top of the list.

His lechery was so strong that it broke out even in the midst of rather hectic circumstances. While accompanying Thomas Henry Kavanagh on his daring escape from Lucknow, he paused for a quick rattle with a local prostitute, and during the battle of Patusan, in Sarawak, he found himself galloping one of Sharif Sahib's concubines without even realizing it but nonetheless continued to the climax of the battle and the tryst.

Flashman's relations with the highest-ranking woman of his era, Queen Victoria, are warm but platonic. He first meets her in 1842 when he receives a medal for his gallantry in Afghanistan and reflects on what a honeymoon she and Prince Albert must have enjoyed. Subsequently, he and his wife received invitations to Balmoral Castle, to the delight of the snobbish Elspeth. For his services during the Indian Mutiny, Victoria not only approved awarding Flashy the Victoria Cross, but loaded the KCB on top of it.

== Appearances ==
=== Film ===
In 1975, Malcolm McDowell played Harry Flashman in Royal Flash, directed by Richard Lester. An earlier attempt by Lester to film the novel Flashman was unsuccessful; John Alderton had been cast in the role.

== References in other works ==
- In the Jackson Speed Memoirs, Robert Peecher borrows heavily from George MacDonald Fraser's Flashman in creating the Jackson Speed character. Like Flashman, Speed is a womaniser and a coward who is undeservedly marked as a hero by those around him. Peecher also adopts the literary device used by Fraser of the "discovered" memoirs. Unlike the English Flashman, Speed is an American making appearances in the Mexican–American War, the US Civil War, and other American conflicts of the 19th century.
- Writer Keith Laidler gave the Flashman story a new twist in The Carton Chronicles by revealing that Flashman is the natural son of Sydney Carton, hero of the Charles Dickens classic A Tale of Two Cities. Laidler has Sydney Carton changing his mind at the foot of the guillotine, escaping death and making wayward and amorous progress through the terrors of the French Revolution, during which time he spies for both the British and French, causes Danton's death, shoots Robespierre, and reminisces on a liaison among the hayricks at the "Leicestershire pile" of a married noblewoman, who subsequently gave birth to a boy—Flashman—on 5 May 1822.
- Sandy Mitchell's Warhammer 40,000 character Commissar Ciaphas Cain is partially inspired by Flashman.
- In comics, writer John Ostrander took Flashman as his model for his portrayal of the cowardly villain Captain Boomerang in the Suicide Squad series. In the letters page to the last issue in the series (#66), Ostrander acknowledges this influence directly. Flashman's success with the ladies is noticeably lacking in the Captain Boomerang character.
- In Kim Newman's alternative history novel The Bloody Red Baron (part of the Anno Dracula series), Flashman is cited as an example of a dishonourable officer in a character's internal monologue. In the later novella Aquarius (set in 1968, one year before the first volume of the Flashman Papers was published), it is mentioned that the fictional St Bartolph's College at the University of London had previously been home to the Harry Paget Flashman Refectory, until its recent renaming to Che Guevara Hall in an attempt to pacify campus activists.
- Flashman's portrait (unnamed, but with unmistakable background and characteristics) hangs in the home of the protagonist of The Peshawar Lancers, an alternative history novel by S. M. Stirling: the family claims to have had an ancestor who held Piper's Fort, as Flashman did; the protagonist claims his sole talents are for horsemanship and languages and has an Afghan in his service named "Ibrahim Khan" (cf. Ilderim Khan, Flashman's Afghan blood brother and servant); late in the book, he plays with Elias the Jew on a "black jade chess set" matching the description of the one Flashman stole from the Summer Palace in Flashman and the Dragon; the book's chief antagonist is named Ignatieff, a reference to Flashman's Russian nemesis Nikolai Ignatieff. Another allusion to Flashman by Stirling occurs in his short story "The Charge of Lee's Brigade", which appeared in the alternative history anthology Alternate Generals (1998, ed. by Harry Turtledove). Here, Sir Robert E. Lee is a British general in the Crimean War who orders an officer, obviously Flashman (cherrypicker trousers, rides like a Comanche in battle), to take part in a better-planned Charge of the Light Brigade. Flashman dies in the attack, demonstrating some courage despite what Lee perceives only as nervousness. So, in this version Flashman again ends up a hero. But—as he himself would have been quick to point out—he is a dead hero.
- Terry Pratchett was a fan of the Flashman series and the Discworld character Rincewind is an inveterate coward with a talent for languages who is always running away from danger, but nevertheless through circumstance emerges with the appearance of an unlikely hero, for which reason he is then selected for further dangerous enterprises. In this he strongly resembles Flashman, although he is totally dissimilar in most other aspects. The word "Rince" means an object that moves quickly so "Rincewind" may be a play on the name the Apache gave to Flashman which was shortened to "Windbreaker" from the full "White-Rider-Goes-So-Fast-He-Destroys-the-Wind-with-His-Speed". The Discworld novel Pyramids has a character named Fliemoe, the bully at the Ankh-Morpork Assassins' Guild school, who is a parody of the original version of Flashman from Tom Brown's Schooldays (including "toasting" new boys). In the Assassins' Guild Yearbook and Diary, Fliemoe is described as having grown up to be "an unbelievable liar and an unsuccessful bully". His name is a play on that of Flashman's crony Speedicut—both "Speedicut" and "Flymo" are brand names of lawn mowers.
- An editorial piece in the 14 May 2011 edition of The Guardian newspaper on the subject of British Prime Minister David Cameron being labelled a "Flashman" was given a Harry Flashman by-line and was written in the style of Flashman's narrative.
- Flashman's son, Harry II, is used as a character in some of the short stories created for the "Tales of the Shadowmen" series. He first appeared in the eighth volume. His son has several of the characteristics of his father, but appears to be less a coward.
- Flashman appears as a minor character in the novel Dickens of the Mounted by Eric Nicol. This novel is a fictionalised account of Francis Dickens and, like the Flashman books, is written in the form of a discovered memoir.
- Flashman is a character in Snooks North and South and Snooks The Presidents' Man by Peter Brian. The protagonist of these books is Snooks, who is another character from Tom Brown's School Days. In Brian's books, Snooks participates in the American Civil War under disreputable circumstances and conceals his identity by using Harry Flashman's name. So the events that would be attributed to Flashman actually occurred to Snooks.
- There is a card for Flashman in Pax Pamir, a board game about the Great Game. In the first Flashman novel, he is in Afghanistan for the First Anglo-Afghan War and participates in the British retreat from Kabul.
- Comic artist Mike Dorey created the character 'Cadman the Fighting Coward' for The Victor who was based on Flashman. Gerald Cadman, originally of Prince Rupert's Horse "The Fighting 43rd", was a cowardly and dishonest officer during the first world war. Like Flashman his cowardice did not stop him from winning many medals, including the Victoria Cross, the DSO, MC and various foreign decorations, none of which he deserved.
- Blackadder, a noted BBC period sitcom series produced in the 1980s features 'Lord Flashheart', a womanising military hero whose character is heavily inspired by Flashman. Unlike Flashman, however, Lord Flashheart is portrayed as legitimately heroic, if incredibly egotistical.
