= Robert Brudenell (disambiguation) =

Robert Brudenell (1726–1768) was a British army officer and politician.

Robert Brudenell may also refer to:

- Robert Brudenell, 6th Earl of Cardigan (1760–1837)
- Robert Brudenell (judge) (1461–1531), British justice
- Robert Brudenell, 2nd Earl of Cardigan (1612–1703), Earl of Cardigan

== See also ==
- Brudenell (disambiguation)
