= James Brudenell, 7th Earl of Cardigan =

British Army officer (1797–1868)

Lieutenant-General The Right Honourable The Earl of Cardigan KCB
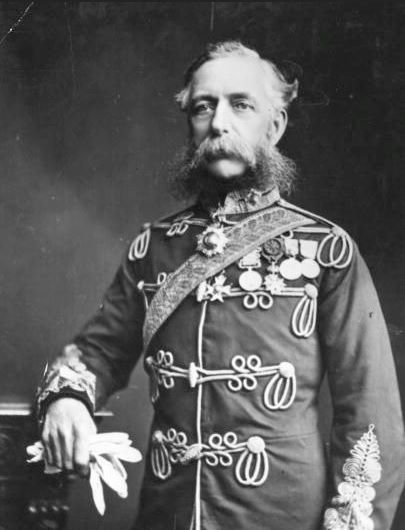
- Born: 16 October 1797; Hambleden, Buckinghamshire, England
- Died: 28 March 1868 (aged 70); Deene Park, Northamptonshire, England
- Military career
- Allegiance: United Kingdom
- Branch: British Army
- Service years: 1824–1866
- Rank: Lieutenant-General
- Nickname: Jim the Bear
- Units: 8th King's Royal Irish Hussars; 15th The King's Hussars; 11th Hussars
- Commands: Light Cavalry Brigade
- Conflicts: Crimean War: Battle of Balaclava
- Awards: Knight Commander of the Order of the Bath; Commander of the Legion of Honour (France)

Lieutenant-General James Thomas Brudenell, 7th Earl of Cardigan (16 October 1797 – 28 March 1868) was a British Army officer who commanded the Light Brigade during the Crimean War, leading its disastrous charge at the Battle of Balaclava. Throughout his life in politics and his long military career, Cardigan epitomized the arrogant and extravagant aristocrat of the period. His progression through the British army was marked by many episodes of extraordinary incompetence, but also by generosity to the men under his command and genuine bravery. As a member of the aristocracy, he had actively and steadfastly opposed any political reform in Britain but, in the last year of his life, he relented and came to acknowledge that such reform would bring benefit to all classes of society.

== Biography ==
=== Early life ===
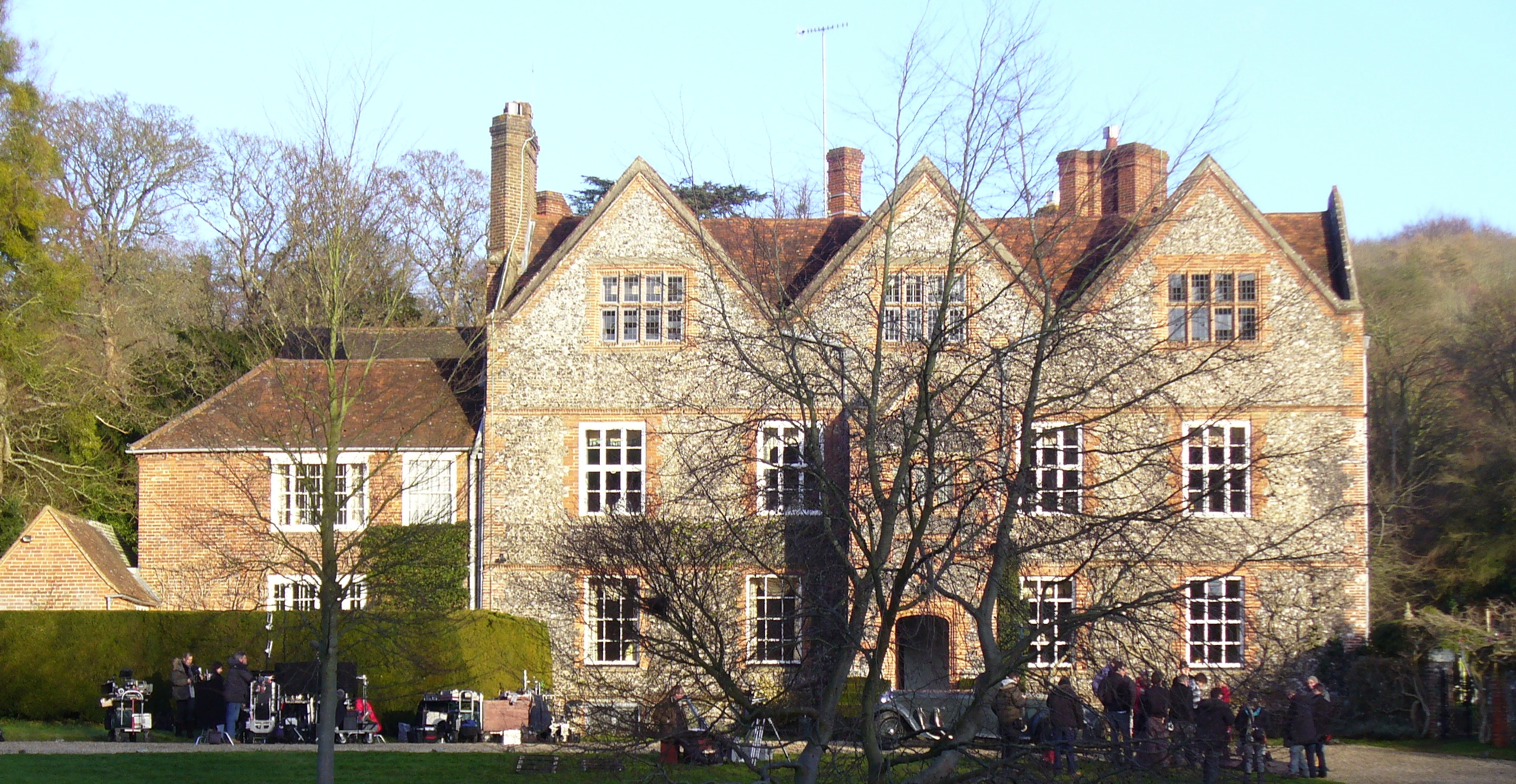
Hambleden Manor, where Brudenell was born

James Brudenell was born in what was, by the standards of the Brudenell family, a modest manor house at Hambleden, Buckinghamshire to Robert Brudenell and his wife Penelope Brudenell. In February 1811 his father inherited the Cardigan earldom, along with the immense estates and revenues that went with it, and the family seat of Deene Park, Northamptonshire. James accordingly became "Lord Brudenell", and took up residence in one of the grandest of households, at the age of fourteen.

He was educated at Harrow where, notwithstanding the fears of his family that a childhood head injury caused by a dangerous fall from a horse had seriously damaged his intellect, he showed aptitude in Greek and Latin. He made good academic progress, but after he had settled a quarrel with another pupil by an organised fistfight, his father removed him from the school (fistfights were tolerated at Harrow; it was the fact of Brudenell's receiving punishment for unauthorised absence while having a broken bone in his hand attended to by a London surgeon which had annoyed the earl). He was subsequently educated at home. Here, as the only son among seven sisters, he developed into something of a spoilt child, accustomed to getting his own way. This has been seen as a cause of his arrogance and stubbornness in later life.

Brudenell was a fine rider and, inspired by the decisive role of cavalry at the battle of Waterloo, his wish was to purchase a commission in a fashionable regiment and serve as an army officer. His father, however, mindful of preserving the family pedigree from risk of battle, would not allow this. Instead in November 1815, he was sent up to Christ Church, Oxford; as an aristocrat he was automatically granted admission without examination. He left in his third year—aristocrats with no academic bent were released after only two years—but despite showing some aptitude, he did not take a degree. (Note: "He stayed for his third year and was 'submitted for examination in the Easter term of 1818'...in the event he did not take [it]". Woodham-Smith says he was two years at university, as does Sweetman.)

=== Parliamentary career ===
In February 1818, during his last term at Oxford, and again following his father's wishes, he became Member of Parliament (MP) for Marlborough, a pocket borough owned by his cousin Charles, Marquess of Ailesbury. The intention was to give Brudenell a grounding in parliamentary affairs before, eventually, he would take his place in the House of Lords.

Brudenell's first action on leaving Oxford was not to take his parliamentary seat but, as was traditional for wealthy young men of the time, to take the Grand Tour. His itinerary, with Russia and Sweden included, was more extensive than the traditional destinations of France and Italy. The trip allowed Brudenell to enjoy the full pleasures of both cultural and social opportunities afforded by the countries he visited.

On his return, Brudenell took his seat in the House of Commons, on the ruling, Tory, side of the House. His contribution to government was minimal: he served with parliamentarians, such as Canning, Peel and Castlereagh, of great commitment and intellect and he could offer nothing to compete. On one issue, however, he made a stand. In 1829 his party introduced a bill allowing limited Catholic emancipation but his patron, cousin Ailesbury, instructed him to oppose it. In three crucial votes Brudenell abstained, because of his admiration for Wellington, the bill's sponsor, and in consequence Ailesbury required him to give up the seat.

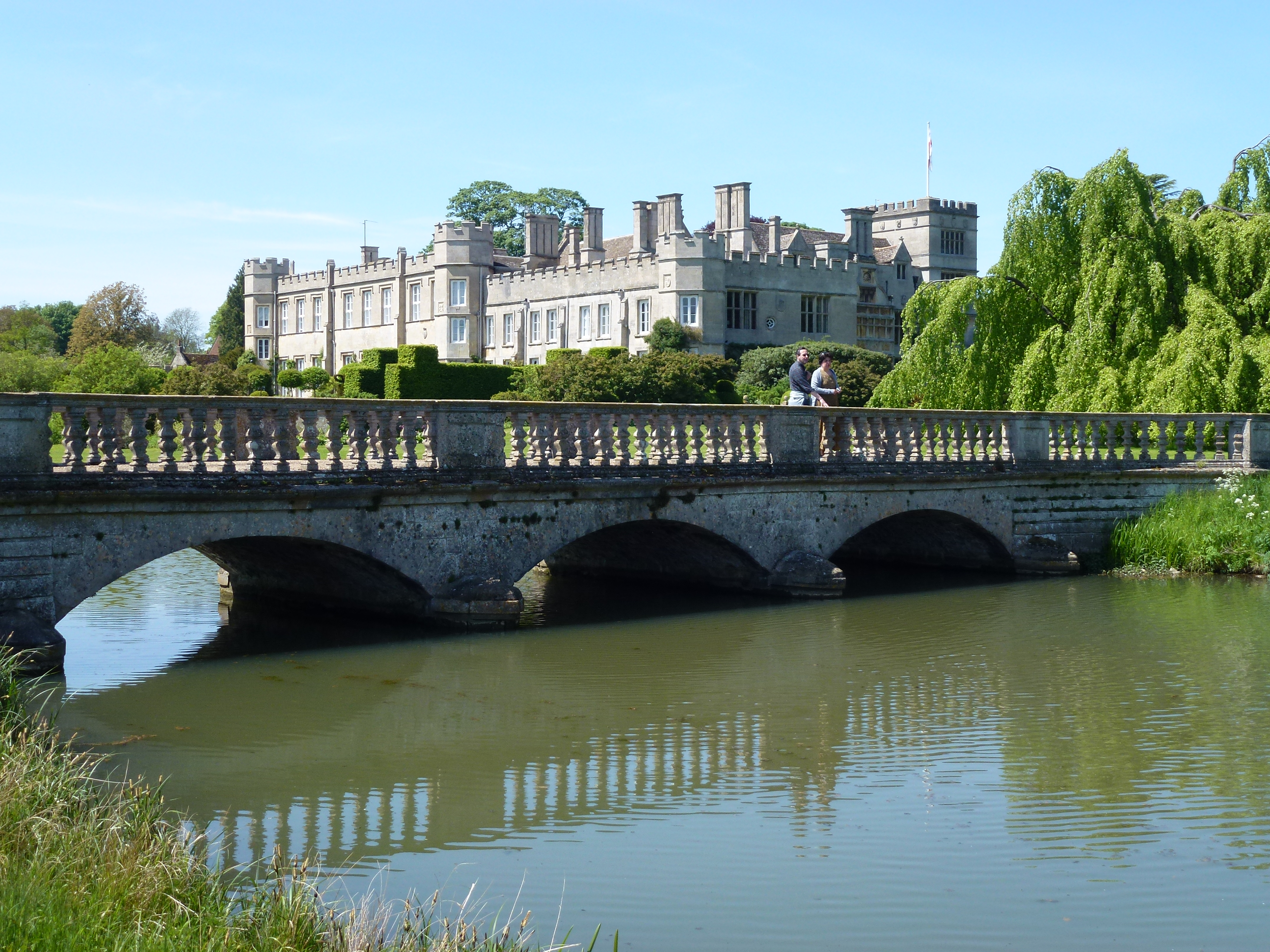
Deene Park, Northamptonshire—seat of the Brudenell family

His return to parliament in 1830 cost him dearly. After his earlier disobedience, he could not expect to be handed a pocket borough so, instead, he had to buy his own. He was elected member for Fowey, Cornwall, at a cost of at least £5,000 (equivalent to £500,000 in 2025). The money, however, was not well spent. Only two years later the seat was one of those abolished in the Reform Act 1832, designed to do away with such malpractices. He sought instead the newly created constituency of Northamptonshire North, local to the family seat of Deene Park but, despite holding the advantage that many of the electors were dependent on the family's patronage and goodwill, the campaign did not go smoothly. On 12 September in Wellingborough he was beaten up and "considerabl[y]" injured while campaigning. As a precaution he distributed about £20,000 (equivalent to £2,000,000 in 2025) among the electorate and the seat was won, albeit as "junior member" to his Whig rival.

He was serving with his regiment in India in 1837 and did not seek re-election at the general election that year; a few days after it took place he inherited the earldom from his father, together with the extensive family estates, including Deene Park.

=== Marriages ===
Early in the 1820s, Brudenell met Mrs. Elizabeth Tollemache Johnstone (8 December 1797 – 15 July 1858). Her husband, Lt.-Col. Christian Johnstone, had been a friend of Cardigan's since childhood, but, according to the account of Johnstone's mother, the wooing of his friend's new wife started soon after the wedding. In March 1824 Brudenell challenged Elizabeth's second cousin Gilbert John Heathcote to a duel, but this was unconnected to the dalliance: Heathcote had just broken off an engagement to Brudenell's sister, Emma. Only "primitive" and inaccurate pistols were used and neither participant was hurt. Johnstone started divorce proceedings in June 1824 and the suit was finalised early in 1826. Johnstone, who had received damages of £1,000 from Brudenell, was apparently happy to be rid of his wife, calling her "the most damned bad-tempered and extravagant bitch in the kingdom". She and Cardigan married on 19 June 1826. It was not a happy marriage; they had no children, and by 1837 they had separated.

After the death of his first wife in July 1858, Brudenell married a second time, on 20 September 1858, to Adeline de Horsey, achieving still greater notoriety as he had been conducting an affair with her as his wife was dying. This, however, was a happy union, notwithstanding the 27-year disparity in their ages and Cardigan's disappointment that there were, again, no children. Adeline, excluded from fashionable society for the rest of her days, accustomed herself to life in the country, happily forsaking her previous interests of books, painting and music, while Cardigan spent large sums of money making their home together comfortable. Adeline even remained on good terms with Cardigan's principal mistress Maria, Marchioness of Ailesbury and tolerated his other affairs.

=== Early military career ===
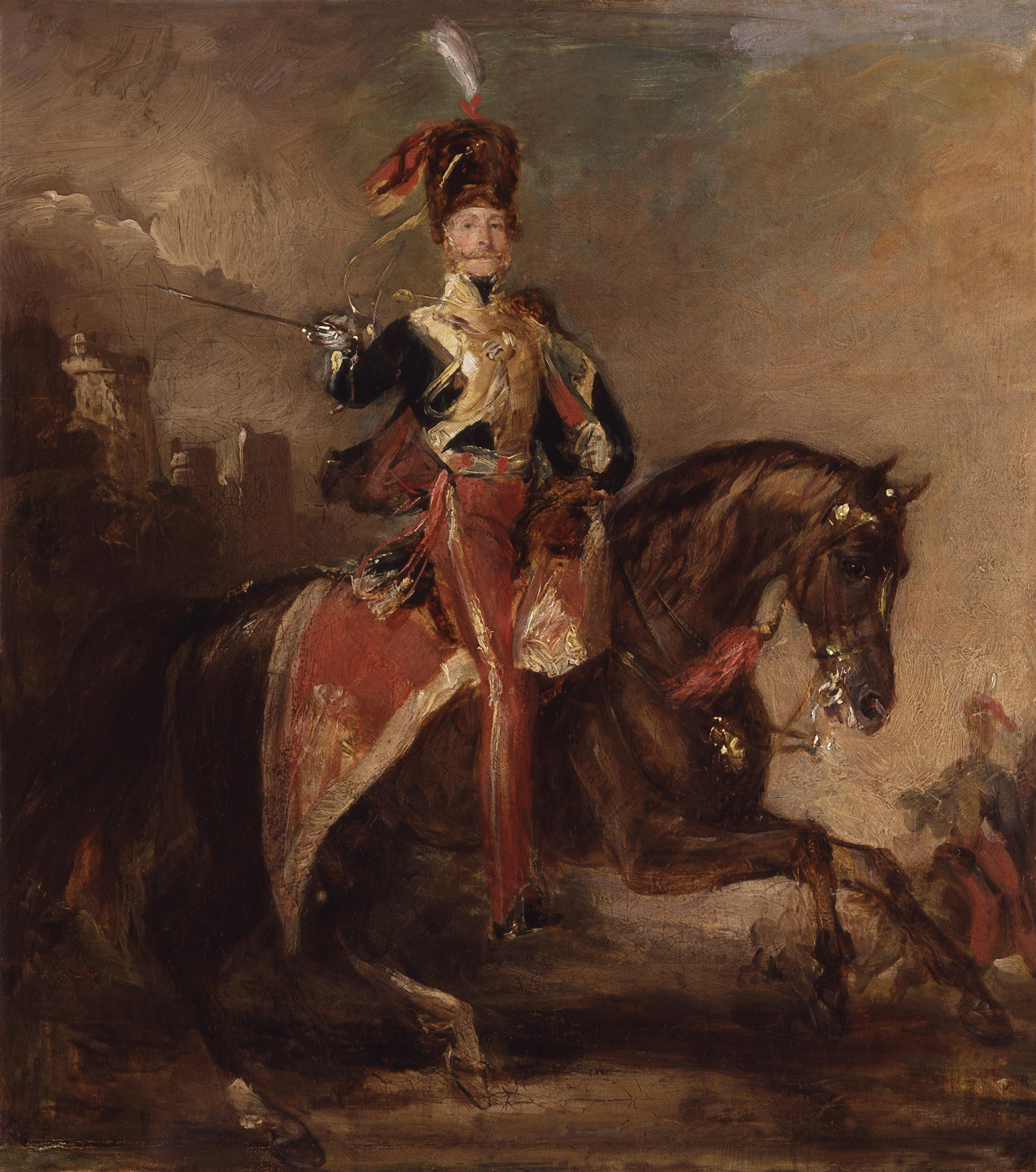
c. 1841 portrait of Brudenell by Francis Grant

Beyond all other interests, which included politics and the preservation of the ancient privileges of the aristocracy against the reformist climate of the period, Brudenell committed himself to a career in the army. At the age of 22, as a captain in the Northamptonshire Yeomanry cavalry, he formed his own troop of horse, armed from official stocks, to guard against possible reformist demonstrations in Northamptonshire. On 6 May 1824, at the age of 27, he joined the 8th King's Royal Irish Hussars. Making extensive use of the purchase of commissions system then in use, he became a lieutenant in January 1825, a captain in June 1826, a major in August 1830 and a lieutenant-colonel, albeit on half-pay, only three months later, on 3 December 1830. He obtained command of the 15th The King's Hussars—at a reported premium of £35,000 (equivalent to £3,400,000 in 2025)—on 16 March 1832.

Parliamentary business, in the form of the hotly contested Reform Bill campaign, delayed his taking command until May. His lack of age and experience, compared with that of the battle-tested officers whom he led (some were veterans of the Battle of Waterloo) drew his naturally punctilious nature to manifest itself in petty-minded bullying. In 1833 he was publicly censured for "reprehensible ... conduct" in a court martial held to determine charges he had laid against Captain Augustus Wathen, a subordinate. Brudenell was dismissed, by personal order of King William IV (who concurred with the "righteous judgement" of Army commander-in-chief Lord Hill), early in 1834. He had, however, influence at court and he asked his sister Harriet, married to Queen Adelaide's chamberlain, Lord Howe, to get the decision reversed. He pestered senior officers and politicians until in March 1836 he was allowed command of the 11th Light Dragoons, notwithstanding the view of Lord Hill that he was "constitutionally unfit for command". After a leisurely passage with his wife, he joined his new command in India in October of the following year, just in time to enjoy some tiger-shooting before seeing the regiment off for Britain at the end of its long posting. He travelled separately in a hired vessel, disdaining to share the discomforts of the warship carrying his troops. Of the two years following his appointment, only four weeks were spent with his regiment. It was in India that Brudenell received word that, consequent on the death of his father on 14 August 1837, he had inherited the title of Earl of Cardigan.

To lead a smart and efficient unit, Cardigan set about using his fortune to improve his regiment's reputation and performance. In this he was successful, as in October 1839 the 11th Light Dragoons was the regiment selected to escort Prince Albert from Dover to London for his marriage to Queen Victoria. The regiment consequently became the 11th, Prince Albert's Own, Hussars, with redesigned, elaborate and expensive new uniforms. George Ryan, a writer otherwise highly critical of Cardigan, estimated that he spent about £10,000 (equivalent to £1,000,000 in 2025) a year towards remounts and distinctive uniform for his troops. In purchasing brilliant new uniforms for his men, Cardigan caused resentment among his professional officers; they had to match the men's attire with even more costly uniforms (a Hussar officer's jacket, for example, cost £40—equivalent to £3,900 in 2025) and officers had to buy their own. He wished his officers to be as aristocratic, flamboyant and stylish as he was himself and as a consequence, he had no time for those men—"Indian officers"—who had learnt their profession over many years of service with the 11th during its long posting to India. This attitude was particularly in evidence in the mess: Cardigan had forbidden the serving of porter, a popular beverage among the professional officers, and when at a formal mess dinner a visitor had requested Moselle wine, which was served in a "black bottle" similar to that of porter, he decided that the "Indian" Captain John Williams Reynolds, who had ordered it for the guest, was defying him. Reynolds was arrested and in due course received a strongly worded reprimand from Lord Hill, who although privately believing that his misgivings about Cardigan had been well founded, felt that, in the interests of good order and discipline, a public demonstration of support was necessary.

Reynolds's guardian sent the details of the case to all the London papers and for many months thereafter Cardigan, his regiment and the commander-in-chief were subject to ridicule, hissing and cat-calls of "black bottle" whenever they appeared in public. A more serious punishment was administered to Richard Reynolds, cousin to John Reynolds and another long-serving captain, who was court-martialled for sending Cardigan an "insubordinate" letter in response to being barred from his commanding officer's quarters. Hill drafted a strong memorandum urging Cardigan to employ "temper and discretion" in dealings with his officers, but Reynolds was cashiered. Not all of the "Indian" officers of the 11th found themselves the object of Cardigan's disfavour: when, in October 1840, Major Jenkins, a long-serving veteran, fell seriously ill, Cardigan attended his bedside for two nights and, when he died, made a substantial payment to the family and, at a personal cost of £400 (equivalent to £35,000 in 2025), secured a scholarship for his younger son. George Ryan acknowledged his generosity towards his officers and men when in hardship and noted him to be a regular, anonymous subscriber to many civic charities. (Note: "Not only was he was ever ready to minister to the pressing necessities of the married men but many officers were in the moment of difficulty succoured by his lordship".Ryan (1855b), pp. 19–20)

=== Duel with Captain Tuckett ===
Cardigan challenged to a duel Captain Harvey Tuckett, a retired officer of the regiment and a long-serving professional soldier, for writing a letter to the Morning Chronicle criticising his treatment of Captain Reynolds in the "black bottle" affair. Tuckett was wounded in the hip.

The exchange of fire, on 12 September 1840, was witnessed by a police constable and Cardigan was prosecuted. He was acquitted on a legal technicality, notwithstanding his boast on arrest that "I have hit my man". The prosecution had demonstrated that Cardigan – on this occasion using a sophisticated duelling pistol with concealed rifling and a hair trigger (supplied by the Mayfair gunsmiths Manton and Hudson) which was thought unsporting according to the usages of duelling – had fired upon Captain Harvey Tuckett. The indictment, however, was that the victim had been "Harvey Garnet Phipps Tuckett". Evidence was received from an army agent paying Tuckett's army pension that this was indeed the full name of Captain Tuckett of the 11th Hussars, yet the discrepancy in the wording of the charge allowed the jury of his peers, 120 in number, unanimously to acquit him; as a nobleman the law of the time allowed him to be tried for a capital crime before the House of Lords sitting as a jury, with Lord Denman (acting as Lord High Steward) as judge. This added to his unpopularity, with The Times alleging that there was deliberate, high-level complicity to leave the loop-hole in the prosecution's case and reporting the view that "in England there is one law for the rich and another for the poor" and The Examiner describing the verdict as "a defeat of justice". Even his obituary described this evasion of justice as "an absurd technical deficiency".

=== Crimean War ===
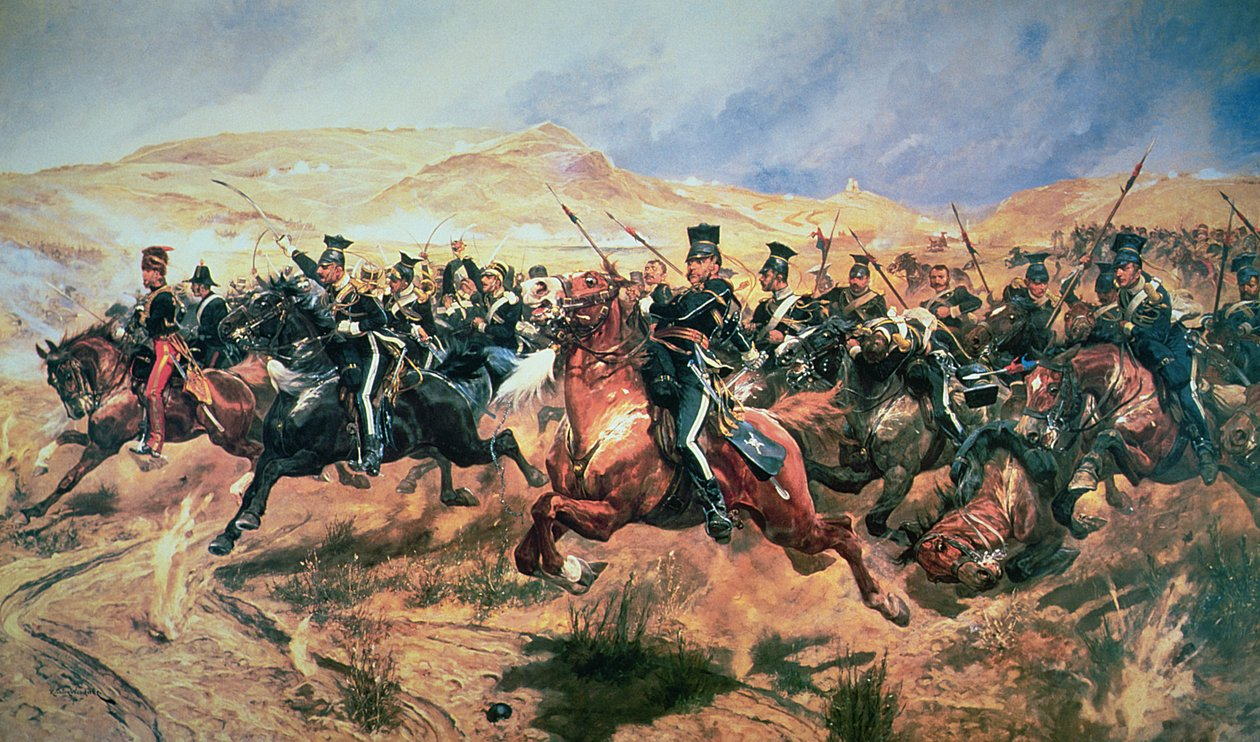
1894 painting of the Charge of the Light Brigade

Promoted to Major-General on 20 June 1854, his most notorious exploit took place during the Crimean War on 25 October 1854 when, in command of the Light Cavalry Brigade at the Battle of Balaclava, he led the Charge of the Light Brigade, a mistaken frontal assault against a well-entrenched Russian artillery position, followed by an almost immediate retreat. Cardigan himself reached the Russian guns before returning unscathed, in a manoeuvre that cost the lives of about 107 out of the 674 men under his command who took part in the charge (although others may have died of wounds later on). (Note: George Ryan's assessment of casualties, in a deliberate contradiction of Cardigan's claims of "two-thirds ... destroyed" was: Officers and men killed 80; wounded 142; prisoners 57. Ryan (1855b), p. 30)

The extent to which Cardigan was to blame for leading the Light Brigade to attack the wrong objective is unproven, since he attacked after receiving a direct order in front of the troops. The order, from commander-in-chief Lord Raglan, was received by Lord Lucan, overall commander of the cavalry division, who handed it to Cardigan. The two men were barely on speaking terms as Lucan was married to one of Cardigan's sisters and, as Cardigan believed, did not treat her well. Cardigan expressed reservation about the proposed action, but considered that his duty was to comply. The order had been conveyed by Captain Louis Nolan, who died in the charge; subsequently, both Lucan and Cardigan blamed Nolan for passing on the order incorrectly. Cardigan's first action on his return from the charge was to report the undisciplined behaviour of Captain Nolan (whom he did not know to be dead) in riding ahead of him at the start of the attack.

A staff officer to army commander Lord Raglan, Colonel the Hon. Somerset John Gough Calthorpe, alleged in his book Letters from a Staff Officer in the Crimea that Cardigan had survived only because he had fled the scene before the charge made contact with the enemy. In his first edition, Calthorpe allowed that Cardigan's horse may have bolted, but later editions pointedly stated the earl was too fine a horseman for this to be a satisfactory explanation. The horse, "Ronald", was of distinctive appearance and easily identified, with both nearside legs white. The charger survived the war and returned safely to England. After some preliminary legal skirmishing, Cardigan sought an indictment for criminal libel in 1863, but his action failed, although the bench made plain that it was only his competence, and not his courage, that was in doubt. They found that he had led his men onto the enemy's guns with "valour ... conspicuously displayed" but thereafter "his conduct as a General was open to criticism". This conclusion is shared by historian Alexander Kinglake, who concludes that although Cardigan displayed a "want ... of competence" after the charge, he had lost contact with his men only through his brave persistence in galloping too far ahead of them.

Oriental Army of the Crimean campaign by Gustav Bartsch. From left to right: Admiral Ferdinand-Alphonse Hamelin, Lord Lucan, Lord Raglan, Admiral Dundas, Sir John Campbell, Duke of Cambridge, Lord Cardigan, Ismail Pasha, Omer Pasha, Muhlis Pasha (Grigore Sturdza), Sultan Abdülmecid I, Said-Bey (Vasile Obedeanu), Ahmed Pasha, col. Desmaret, Marshal Baraguey d'Hilliers, Prince Napoleon, col. Trochu, Marshal de Saint-Arnaud, general Bosquet, general de Canrobert

There is no doubt that Cardigan had reached and overrun the enemy battery: he was recognised beyond the guns by Prince Leon Hieronim Radziwiłł, an enemy officer with whom he was acquainted before the war; Radziwiłł issued instructions that Cardigan was to be taken prisoner and not killed. Cardigan, considering his duty then done and disdaining, as he later explained, to "fight the enemy among private soldiers", turned about and made his way steadily—he himself said that his return was at the walk to avoid any unseemly appearance of haste—for his own lines.

Lord Lucan recalled things differently, later giving evidence that Cardigan had been galloping back, only slowing to walk when he realised he was being watched. This hurried retreat was also noticed by General Liprandi, Russian commander, who made enquiries to identify the English officer whom he saw galloping away after the attack. Officers and men of the second and third lines—men for whom as brigade commander Cardigan remained responsible—were still advancing at the charge when they saw their commander riding in retreat. Lord George Paget of the 4th Hussars later declared that Cardigan alone could issue the required orders when the time came to break off the engagement and some needless fighting, hand-to-hand and intense against great odds, could thus have been avoided. Other officers too had noticed his absence: one, Lord William Paulet on Lucan's staff, had noticed Cardigan "riding like a madman" towards the rear. When Colonel Paget, one of the last to return, encountered a "composed" Cardigan, he challenged him to account for himself. Unsatisfied with the response, Paget wrote an official complaint to the new Commander-in-Chief, the Duke of Cambridge. Cambridge forwarded the letter to Cardigan for comment and Cardigan's reply in turn complained that Paget had not in fact taken the part he claimed during the attack that day. Inconclusive claim and counter-claim followed, until Cardigan's attentions were diverted to the allegations made public when Calthorpe's book Letters went on sale.

In the week following the battle of Balaclava, the remnants of the Light Brigade were posted inland, to high ground overlooking the British lines surrounding Inkerman. Cardigan, who had spent most nights of the campaign aboard his luxury sailing yacht Dryad in Balaclava harbour, found this move a great inconvenience and his leadership of the brigade suffered as a result. He missed the Battle of Inkerman (5 November 1854), casually asking journalist William Russell (who was returning from the conflict) "What are they doing, what was the firing for...?" as he rode up from the harbour at noon on the first day. The decisive stages of the battle were on the second day and again Cardigan was absent, although he managed to arrive at a more creditable 10:15 am. The part played by the brigade was not great and, to avoid embarrassing the earl, it was not mentioned in the official account of the battle forwarded to London.

Whatever Cardigan's faults, he had always tried to ensure that the troops under his command were well-equipped. However, as the Crimean winter fell over the Light Brigade's exposed position, food, fodder, clothing and shelter were all in short supply. Beyond writing letters pointing out the deficiencies, Cardigan did nothing. Food and fodder were available at the coast, but he refused to release any men and horses to carry up stores, as his officers pleaded, in case of a surprise attack by the enemy and because "I had no orders to do so". Colonel Alexander Tulloch, who gave evidence to a board of enquiry into the failure, noted that in fact Cardigan had more horses than he had needed: indeed more horses than men to ride them, and wrote privately after his evidence was excluded from the final report: "Because Lord Cardigan might have had some difficulty in carrying up all the barley to which his corps was entitled he [resolved himself] therefore justified in bringing up none." There was great hardship and many horses died.

On 8 December 1854, citing ill health, Cardigan set off for England. In these circumstances, the word of an officer regarding his fitness to serve would normally be accepted, but Raglan permitted his departure only after a medical board had confirmed his claimed disability. Conveyed on the gunboat HMS Caradoc (1847) to Scutari, where he visited the military hospital, he embarked for Marseilles on the P&O steamer PS Ripon on 26 December 1854, continuing by train, via Paris, to Boulogne.

=== Reception ===
Newspaper accounts of the gallant charge had been given wide circulation in England by the time Cardigan's ship berthed at the port of Folkestone on 13 January 1855 and the town offered him a rapturous welcome. In London he was mobbed by an enthusiastic crowd and on 16 January at Queen Victoria's invitation he was received at Windsor to explain to her and Prince Albert the details of the battle. Victoria noted how "modestly" he presented his story, but this reticence was absent in his public appearances: on 5 February, he gave a highly exaggerated account of his participation in the charge at a banquet held in his honour at the Mansion House, London. On 8 February, at a speech in his home town of Northampton, he went even further, describing how he had shared the privations of his men by living the "whole time in a common tent" and how, after the charge, he had rallied his troops and pursued the fleeing enemy artillerymen as far as the Tchernaya river. As his biographer Saul David points out, "a more misleading account of his own exploits could hardly have been given".

Cardigan was able to enjoy many months of adulation before doubts about his conduct emerged: the government recommended him for the Order of the Garter, although the Queen denied him this honour because of the previous unseemly incidents in his private life. On 1 February 1855 he was made Inspector-General of Cavalry and he was appointed Knight Commander of the Order of the Bath (along with Commissary-General William Filder, General James Airey and Lord Lucan) on 7 July 1855. He was also made Commander of the French Legion of Honour on 2 August 1856 and Knight (second class) of the Turkish Order of Medjidie on 2 March 1858.

Merchants, eager to profit from his fame, sold pictures depicting his role in the charge and written chronicles, based on his own accounts, were rushed into print. The "cardigan", a knitted waistcoat supposedly worn by the earl on the campaign, became fashionable and many were sold.

Cardigan's commanding officer and brother-in-law, Lord Lucan, had been recalled in disgrace—largely brought about by the determination of the commander-in-chief, Lord Raglan, to displace blame from himself—and arrived in England only two weeks after his subordinate but, as the officer who had "looked on" (a pun on his name much exploited by Cardigan) while the charge had taken place, little regard was given to his version of events. (Lucan had earned the unfortunate nickname of "Lord Look-on" when Lord Raglan ordered him to withdraw, and remain in reserve, during a skirmish at the Bulganek River before the earlier Battle of Alma.) In July 1855, The Times hinted that the public had been misled over "the real nature of [Cardigan's] services in the East", but, in the absence of anything definitive, his popularity remained. However, officers who had taken command in the aftermath of the charge, the role that Cardigan was claiming for himself, had heard of his reception in England and were anxious to put the record straight. The writer George Ryan, who had rushed out a hasty pamphlet praising Cardigan, retracted his words ("I have now corrected the sham.") and was the first to report Cardigan's fellow officers' reservations about the earl's conduct on the day. As the soldiers themselves began to return to England, the doubts hardened. Not until the following year, however, with the official enquiries of Colonel Tulloch and the publication of Calthorpe's Letters, was there proof that Cardigan had not been telling the truth. Nonetheless, he continued, with characteristic arrogance and self-delusion, as if nothing was amiss and he remained in his cavalry post for the next five years. Eight months on active service, or, A diary of a general officer of cavalry, in 1854, published in 1855, was Cardigan's own account of his time in the Crimea.

Cardigan's overwhelming enthusiasm for the army remained and the meticulous standards of dress and parade that he had required of his earlier commands he now applied to the whole cavalry. He was made Colonel of the Regiment of the 5th Dragoon Guards in 1859, but he derived more satisfaction when, after his formal retirement in 1860, and its accompanying promotion to Lieutenant-General in 1861, he became colonel of his favourite regiment, the 11th Hussars, which he had first commanded in 1836. He remained in royal favour and early in 1861 he was selected to accompany the Prince of Wales, heir to the throne, to inspect Prussian cavalry manoeuvres. He was possibly an unwise choice as his arrogant behaviour towards his hosts, themselves no strangers to high self-esteem among military officers, resulted in numerous challenges to duel; he was quickly sent home. The Queen, however, blocked his colonelcy of one of the Household regiments because of his dalliance with Adeline while still married to Elizabeth. His last military function was a mounted review of the 11th Hussars before their embarkation for India in May 1866. He was joined by Colonel John Reynolds, who had been Cardigan's adversary in the "black bottle affair", but the men had at last settled their differences in the previous year.

=== Retirement ===
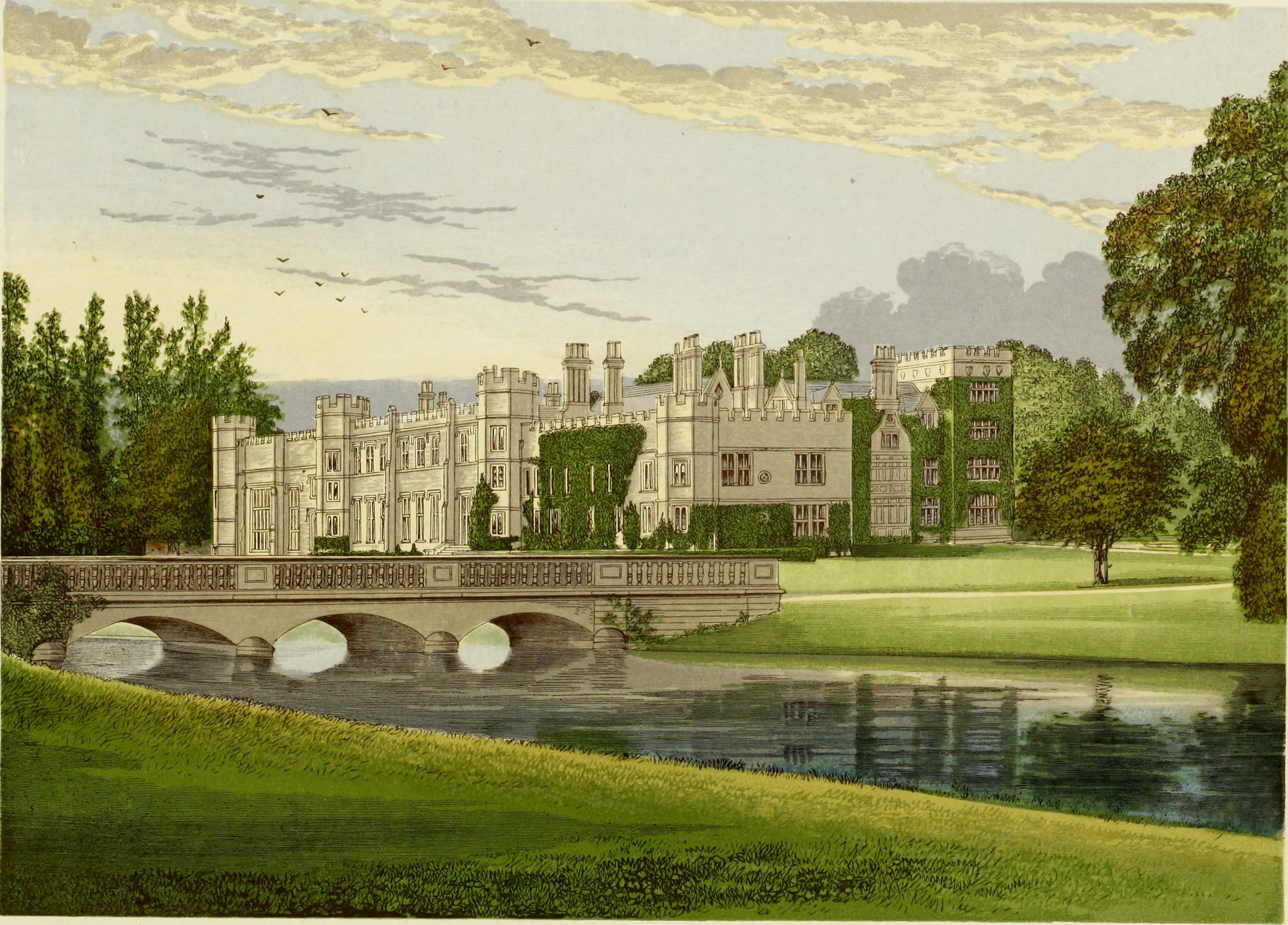
Deene Park

After his retirement in 1866, he lived happily at Deene, passing his time in luxury with horse racing, hunting and shooting. He remained a member of the Royal Thames Yacht Club and the Royal Yacht Squadron, and was Commodore of the Royal Southern Yacht Club.

His parliamentary life continued, with the occasional foray to London to speak in the House of Lords on military matters and to continue to press for further official recognition of his inglorious career. In 1866 he was, with Thomas Carlyle, one of the organisers of public demonstrations of support for Edward Eyre, controversial Governor of Jamaica, against allegations that he had dealt too harshly with the Morant Bay rebellion of the previous October. He surprised some commentators when, in 1867, he spoke in favour of the second Reform Bill. In acknowledging his change of heart he said that the time for trying to stem the tide of reform, an endeavour in which he had long strived, had passed and given "good luck" the extension of the vote would "confer ... a great benefit upon every class of the community". In 1868 he presented to the House a petition calling for additional recognition of the late General Henry Shrapnel, inventor of the explosive artillery shell, in recognition of its effectiveness at Waterloo.

He died on 28 March 1868 from injuries sustained the previous day, caused by a fall from a dangerous horse "he would not have permitted any friend to ride", possibly following a stroke, and was buried in a specially built tomb in the family chapel at St Peter's Church, Deene. He was succeeded in his title by his second cousin, George William Brudenell-Bruce, who died childless in 1878.

After the death of his widow in 1915, Deene Park reverted to the descendants of George William's younger brother, Ernest Augustus Charles.

== Assessments ==
Assessments of Lord Cardigan have varied significantly over time. The 9th edition (1889) of the Encyclopædia Britannica noted that his actions at Balaclava had become "the subject of much controversy, some critics having an eye only to the splendid daring and unquestioning obedience to orders, and others seeing only a foolhardy and unjustifiable throwing away of valuable lives", while the 11th edition (1910–11) rephrased the passage to read that "Cardigan and his men alike have been credited by the bitterest critics of the charge with splendid daring and unquestioning obedience to orders".

In her sweeping condemnation of the Victorian class system, The Reason Why (1953), Cecil Woodham-Smith used the Earl as a prism on the ills of British society of the time (but conceded that in the Charge itself Cardigan conducted himself with unwavering courage and discipline). Donald Thomas's 1974 biography Cardigan: The Hero of Balaclava provided a more sympathetic portrayal. Saul David's 1997 hostile assessment, on the other hand, was entitled simply The Homicidal Earl. Terry Brighton's 2005 book Hell Riders: The Truth about the Charge of the Light Brigade provides a critical account of Cardigan as a brigade commander but finds him in no way to blame for the charge.

== Cultural depictions ==
The Charge of the Light Brigade, a 1968 film based on Woodham-Smith's research, made Cardigan (played by Trevor Howard) its primary antagonist. The movie depicts Cardigan as a harsh disciplinarian, womaniser and military incompetent. It shows the "black bottle" affair, though it incorrectly makes Louis Nolan Cardigan's antagonist, and heavily features his rivalry with Lord Lucan. It also fictitiously shows Cardigan pursuing an affair with Fanny Duberly.

George MacDonald Fraser's The Flashman Papers novels feature Cardigan as a recurring villain. In the first instalment he commands Flashman in the 11th Hussars and transfers him to India after he marries Elspeth, on the grounds that she is the daughter of a tradesman. Cardigan reappears in Flashman at the Charge, where Flashman catches Cardigan trying to seduce Elspeth. Flashman later reluctantly joins Cardigan for the Charge of the Light Brigade. He appears briefly in Flashman in the Great Game, where Cardigan demands Flashman defend Cardigan's reputation against hostile journalists. Flashman not only refuses but pointedly insults Cardigan. His last mention comes in Flashman and the Angel of the Lord, where Flashman observes Cardigan's liaison with Fanny Paget.

Cardigan appears as an antagonist in the 2015 video game Assassin's Creed Syndicate by Ubisoft, set in 1868. A member of the Templar Order, Cardigan is tasked with assassinating Prime Minister Benjamin Disraeli to prevent the passing of the Corrupt Practices Act. He is assassinated inside the Palace of Westminster by protagonist Jacob Frye.

== See also ==
- List of British recipients of the Légion d'Honneur for the Crimean War

== Notes ==
Parliament of the United Kingdom
Preceded by William Hill; Hon. Edward Stopford	Member of Parliament for Marlborough; 1818–1829; With: John Wodehouse 1818–1826; Earl Bruce 1826–1829; Thomas Bucknall-Estcourt 1829	Succeeded by Thomas Bucknall-Estcourt; William John Bankes
Preceded by Hon. Robert Henley Eden; George Lucy	Member of Parliament for Fowey; 1830–1832; With: George Lucy 1830; John Cheesment-Severn 1830–1832	constituency abolished
New constituency	Member of Parliament for North Northamptonshire; 1832–1837; With: Viscount Milton 1832–1833; Viscount Milton 1833–1835; Thomas Philip Maunsell 1835–1837	Succeeded by Thomas Philip Maunsell; Viscount Maidstone
Military offices
Preceded by Sir John Slade	Colonel of the 5th Dragoon Guards; 1859–1860	Succeeded by Sir James Yorke Scarlett
Preceded by Sir Henry Wyndham	Colonel of the 11th (or Prince Albert's Own) Hussars; 1860–1868	Succeeded by George William Key
Peerage of England
Preceded by Robert Brudenell	Earl of Cardigan; 1837–1868	Succeeded by George Brudenell
