= Fanny Duberly =

English soldier's wife and journal writer

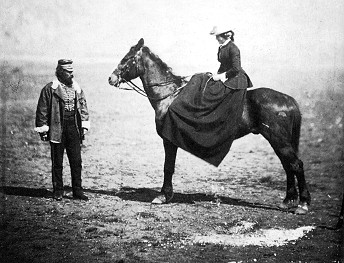
Captain and Mrs Duberly photographed in the Crimea by Roger Fenton in 1855

Frances Isabella Duberly (27 September 1829 – 19 November 1902) was an English diarist who wrote a journal of her experiences on campaign in the Crimean War and the Indian Rebellion of 1857. Her husband, Captain Henry Duberly, was paymaster to the 8th Royal Irish Hussars, part of the British light cavalry that took part in the Charge of the Light Brigade. Duberly's journal of her time in Crimea was published as Journal Kept During the Russian War (1856). It not only includes eye-witness accounts, but is also a record of gossip and rumours circulating in the British Army.

== Early history ==
Frances Isabella Locke was born in Devizes in Wiltshire in 1829, daughter of the banker and politician Wadham Locke (1779–1835) and Anna Maria Selina, née Powell (1783–1838). After her mother's death she moved to live with her eldest brother (also Wadham Locke) at Ashton Gifford House, Wiltshire. She left Ashton Gifford on her marriage to Henry Duberly (1822–1890) in 1845, which took place shortly after her brother had married for a second time.

== Crimea ==
Duberly travelled with her husband to the Crimea in 1854 and stayed with him throughout his time there, despite the protests of commanders such as Lord Lucan. As the only officer's wife at the front, she was the centre of attention. Described as "a splendid rider, witty, ambitious, daring, lively, loquacious and gregarious", she seemed to possess the physical requirements and tough attitude required of her surroundings, writing shortly after her arrival at Varna, in Bulgaria, en route to the Crimea that she "was awoke by the reveillée at half-past two; rose, packed our bedding and tent, got a stale egg and a mouthful of brandy and was in my saddle by half-past five." She was told of planned attacks ahead of time, giving her the opportunity to be in a good position to witness them. Such was the case at the Battle of Balaclava, where her journey from camp to meet up with Henry and watch the battle took her quite close to the enemy. Though her husband survived the day, many of her friends did not: "Even my closed eyelids were filled with the ruddy glare of blood." Being so close to the front line in one of the first "modern" wars, Mrs Duberly differed from many of her compatriots back home in comprehending the reality of war. When her husband asked if she wanted to view the aftermath of the Battle of Inkerman, she told him she could not as "the thought of it made me shudder and turn sick."

Duberly’s adventures did not always sit well with society: the presence of a middle-class woman at the scene of savage battles was regarded as unwomanly and ungentle, and her accounts of the rank-and-file soldiery were considered to be superficial and unfeeling. She was pointedly snubbed at the Royal review of her husband’s regiment after the war. The journal she published after the war had originally been intended to have a dedication to Queen Victoria, but this was refused, much to her dismay. Nonetheless she was popular with the troops (who nicknamed her "Mrs. Jubilee") and many people in England. Her published journal met with some success and prints of a photo of her taken by Roger Fenton sold quite well.

== India ==
Duberly again accompanied her husband when the 8th Hussars were sent to India in 1856, travelling on the SS Great Britain which departed from Cork 24 September 1857 and arrived in Mumbai 17 December. She stayed with him throughout the final months of the Sepoy Mutiny. She was adamant about accompanying the troops on campaign and told her sister that she would "stain my face and hands and adopt the Hindoo caftan and turban," refusing to stay behind. At Gwalior in June 1858, while watching the start of a cavalry charge, her horse ran after the rest and, instead of holding back, she told her husband "I must go!" and galloped away.

== Married life ==
The Duberlys had no children. She was a great friend and supporter of her husband, who never seemed to be jealous of his wife as the centre of attention in the all-male environment of the British Army in the field. She described her husband as "a friend I am obliged to support." He was ill when the time came to go ashore in the Crimea and she told her sister that "Lord Cardigan intends him to land with the troops, but I don’t intend him to do so." The Duberlys had their differences of opinion on the nature of military service. When orders came from Lucan that she must be put ashore at Constantinople, she wrote that "Henry looks upon the order as a soldier; I as a woman, and laugh at it."

== Later life ==
The Duberlys returned to Britain in 1864. She retained her campaign memories but, when asked to reminisce about what she had witnessed, she replied that "those days are best forgotten." Nevertheless, she retained her adventurous spirit and complained to a nephew in 1896 that "I cannot stand dullness for long, and life gets duller and duller as one gets older." She died at Cheltenham in 1902, aged 73 and was buried with her husband in the churchyard of St Peter's church in the Leckhampton district of that town. Her husband, having risen to the rank of Lt. Colonel in the Army Pay Department, had died in 1890.

== In fiction ==
Fanny Duberly was played by Jill Bennett in the 1968 film The Charge of the Light Brigade in which she was wrongly depicted as having a sexual relationship with Cardigan, played by Trevor Howard.

She featured in two books about Harry Flashman by George MacDonald Fraser: Flash for Freedom! and Flashman at the Charge. In both of these, particularly the former, she is a target for Flashman's lust but he fails in his attempted seduction of her. Fraser introduces her, still Fanny Locke, as "a damned handsome eighteen with the shape of a well-developed matron." He remarks on her prettiness, fair hair and blue eyes as well as complimenting her on her riding skills: "she could ride, that girl." Flashman desires to have sex with her, opportunity allowing, and laments not being able to do so or at least to "give her tits a squeeze." Fraser has Flashman jealous of Duberly's husband, describing him in Flashman's words as a "muff" who, when on guard duty, sits outside the room "like a blasted water bailiff."

Mrs Duberly is mentioned in Queen Victoria's Bomb by Ronald W. Clark (1967). The story consists of the memoirs of Professor Franklin Huxtable whose invention of an ultimate weapon in the 1850s was supposed to make warfare impossible. The bomb is trialled in a remote part of India.

== Sources ==
- Barham, John. The Indomitable Duberly, 29 June 2006.
- Duberly, Frances Isabella (1855). Journal kept during the Russian war, from the departure of the army from England in April, 1854, to the fall of Sebastopol. London: Longman, Brown, Green and Longmans.
- Farwell, Byron (1972). Queen Victoria's Little Wars. New York: Harper and Row. ISBN 9780060112226.
- Mrs. Duberly's War: Journal and Letters from the Crimea, 1854–1856. Edited by Christine Kelly. Oxford: Oxford University Press.
- Warner, Philip. The Crimean War, A Reappraisal. New York: Taplinger, 1972.
