= David Walker (costume designer) =

Costume designer for ballet, opera and theatre

- Born: 18 July 1934; Kolkata
- Died: 27 December 2008 (aged 74)
- Occupation: Costume designer
- Years active: 1960-2000

David Walker (1934–2008) was a costume designer for theatre, ballet, opera and film. The V&A museum describes Walker as "one of the world's leading designers... creating productions for every major opera house and theatre company".

Born in Kolkata, Walker grew up in London and attended the Central School of Arts and Crafts.

== Costume career ==
Walker's first professional costume role was as a cutter at the Glyndebourne opera. This was followed by jobs with "pioneering" director Joan Littlewood in Liverpool and London, and with Tony Richardson for the production of The Changeling in 1961. He later worked for the Royal Court Theatre, the Royal Shakespeare Company and the Royal Ballet.

It was for a film collaboration with Richardson, The Charge of the Light Brigade (1968), that Walker received a BAFTA award for Best Costume Design. Walker was costume designer, in close collaboration with Lila Di Nobili, who was credited as colour and period consultant. John Mollo was also involved in the historical research. The result was a "visual treat" full of period detail.

A couple of years later, he was awarded an Emmy for Outstanding Achievement in costume design for a television version of Hamlet (1971) starring Richard Chamberlain and directed by Peter Wood. He was nominated for an Emmy again for the mini-series The Corn is Green (1979).

David Jays has written that "dance was at the heart of [Walker's] work". Many of Walker's ballet designs were collaborations with set designer Henry Bardon, who had also studied with Lila De Nobili, and shared the designer's style of "wistful fantasy". Their co-productions included The Dream (1964, Royal Ballet), which drew upon Victorian lithographs for inspiration, and Cinderella (1965). Walker's designs for The Dream are now held in the collection of the Victoria & Albert Museum, London. Walker's lush, fairytale designs were sometimes criticised as "chocolate boxy", though Arlene Croce in The New Yorker praised his "exceptional delicacy" when working on sets and costumes together.

At the London Festival Ballet, Walker designed Giselle (1971) and Sylphide (1979) for director Peter Schaufuss. He returned to Cinderella in 1996 for a Romantic revival choreographed by Michael Cordor for the English National Ballet. Corder recalled that Walker was "notably modest" and refused to come onstage for the first-night curtain calls. Despite his modesty, Walker received an Olivier Award for his design of this production.
