= John Williams Reynolds =

English cavalry officer and chemist

John Williams Reynolds (25 December 1816 – 28 July 1874) was an English cavalry officer and organic chemist. His disagreement in 1840 with Lord Cardigan, his commanding officer, (the notorious "black bottle affair") made him famous, and a popular cause célèbre in London. At the end of 1840, he left his regiment to study at the Royal Military College, Sandhurst. After graduating, he did not return to regimental duties but took up the study of organic chemistry at the Royal College of Chemistry, London. He discovered the compound propylene, thus advancing the theory of homology. He was recalled to service in 1851 and rose to the rank of Major-General.

== Early life ==
Reynolds was the son of Lieutenant-General Charles Reynolds of the army of the Honourable East India Company (HEIC), who in 1807, had returned to live in England after his retirement. He was born on Christmas Day 1816 in the parish of St Marylebone, London. Charles Reynolds died in 1819 and John Reynolds became the ward of Henry Harvey, another former officer of the HEIC, whose own son died 1828. In April 1830, Reynolds was sent as a boarder to Eton College, leaving after four years.

== Regimental service ==
On 18 September 1835, Reynolds was commissioned as a cornet in the British Army, taking a passage to India to join the 11th Light Dragoons, a "society" regiment then stationed at Meerut. The regiment was recalled to England in 1838, and Reynolds was promoted to lieutenant on 2 November of that year. He initially made a favourable impression upon Lord Cardigan, the commanding officer (with whom he was on social terms), and on 10 January 1840, he was, by purchase, made captain.

=== "Black bottle" affair ===
On 18 May 1840, while stationed at Canterbury Barracks, Kent, the officers of the 11th Hussars (the renamed 11th Light Dragoons) held a formal mess dinner in honour of a visit from General James Sleigh, the Inspector-General of Cavalry. Reynolds ordered a bottle of moselle wine for a guest, which the waiter brought to the table in its customary black bottle. Lord Cardigan mistook the beverage for porter (a form of beer also sold in black bottles) and sent Reynolds a reprimand for ungentlemanly behaviour. Reynolds refused to accept this and Cardigan had him placed under close arrest, confined to his room for 22 hours a day. After three days of this detention, the conditions were relaxed to "open arrest", while Cardigan travelled to Horse Guards, London, (the headquarters of the British army) to complain of Reynolds's behaviour. Lord Hill, the commander-in-chief, was persuaded to send Reynolds a letter of admonishment but Reynolds would not accept this, and in turn wrote to Horse Guards to request permission to leave the Army. In this he was supported by his guardian, Henry Harvey (by this time an influential figure in society) who threatened to release the true background to the disagreement to the Morning Post newspaper: Cardigan's resentment of the young officer had arisen when a court martial on which Reynolds had served as president had denied Cardigan's wish for a conviction; furthermore Cardigan had claimed, without justification, that officers like Reynolds who had served in India lacked discipline. Fearing scandal, not least because a large proportion of the Army's commanders had served in India, Lord Somerset, the military secretary, persuaded Reynolds to stay, with a promise of six months' leave, a two-year senior command course at the Royal Military College, Sandhurst (RMC) and an intimation that he would never again have to serve under Cardigan. Reynolds accepted. The story broke to the public on 17 September 1840, when an anonymous but detailed account of the affair appeared in The Times.

Reynolds was allowed paid leave for the remainder of 1840, until he received leave of absence to take his place at RMC Sandhurst. The generous terms Somerset offered Reynolds did not go unnoticed: George Muntz, a reformist MP, alleged in a House of Commons speech on 13 May 1841 that the undue favouritism being shown to Reynolds was, in the public's mind, a confirmation that Cardigan had been in the wrong but, as an aristocrat, he was being shielded from scrutiny.

On completion of the course, Reynolds did not return to service immediately, taking official leave-of-absence as a "half-pay-officer".

== Study of chemistry ==
On Reynolds's release from the army, he enrolled as a student at the Royal College of Chemistry, London, investigating the new field of organic chemistry under the direction of Professor Wilhelm Hofmann. In April 1850, Reynolds published a paper in which he reported the identification of a new hydrocarbon: while analysing the products formed when fusel oil was heated he found that a component in the original mixture, amyl alcohol, yielded an unknown gas. To identify it, he reacted it with bromine and isolated the resulting compound. He deduced that this was C_{6}H_{5}Br_{2} and that the original gas was therefore C_{6}H_{6}. He named the gas propylene, after the hypothesised, but not yet isolated, propylic alcohol. The Royal Society of Chemistry recognised this as an important step in the development of the theory of homology. He was elected a Fellow of The Chemical Society of London.

== Army staff officer ==
On the outbreak of the Crimean War at the end of 1853, the War Office decided that Reynolds should be recalled to fill vacated staff officer positions. After a spell of duty at Horse Guards in the Adjutant-General's department, in 1856 he was posted to Jamaica as deputy Adjutant-General, with the rank of lieutenant-colonel. Returning to England after ten years, he was assigned to the northern division of the army at Manchester as assistant Adjutant-General. He retired on 23 December 1864. He was promoted to brevet major-general on 6 March 1868.

== Reconciliation with Cardigan ==
At a formal dinner of the 11th Hussars in 1865, some senior officers of the regiment persuaded Cardigan to meet Reynolds, and the two men entered the dining room together, hand-in-hand. Cardigan and Reynolds rode together at the farewell parade of the 11th Hussars on 15 May 1866, before the regiment's posting to India.

== Personal life ==
On 20 January 1841, Reynolds was married to Helen Harvey, his guardian's daughter. A son, Henry Charles Reynolds, was born 12 October 1841. After a short illness Reynolds died in Koblenz, Germany, on 28 July 1874.
