= Thomas Brudenell =

Thomas Brudenell may refer to:

- Thomas Brudenell, 1st Earl of Cardigan (c.1583–1663), English peer and Royalist soldier
- Thomas Brudenell (British Army officer, died 1707), British Army officer

== See also ==
- Thomas Brudenell-Bruce (disambiguation)
- Brudenell (disambiguation)
