= Thomas Brudenell-Bruce =

Thomas Brudenell-Bruce may refer to:

- Thomas Brudenell-Bruce, 1st Earl of Ailesbury (1729–1814), British courtier
- Thomas Brudenell-Bruce, Earl of Cardigan (born 1982), heir apparent to the Marquessate of Ailesbury

== See also ==
- Brudenell-Bruce
- Thomas Brudenell (disambiguation)
- Thomas Bruce (disambiguation)
