= Brudenell (disambiguation) =

Brudenell may refer to:

Places in Canada

- Brudenell, Ontario
- Brudenell, Prince Edward Island

Surname

- Brudenell Baronets
- James Brudenell (disambiguation)
- Thomas Brudenell (disambiguation)

Music

- Brudenell Social Club, a music venue in Hyde Park, Leeds, England.
