= Terry Brighton =

British military historian and author

- Born: 28 April 1949 (age 77); Boston, Lincolnshire, England
- Occupation: Writer
- Spouse: Linda
- Writing career
- Genre: military history

Terry Brighton (born 28 April 1949) is a British military historian and author.

== Biography ==
Terry Brighton studied philosophy at Lancaster University and theology at Birmingham University before being ordained an Anglican priest. His parishes included St Martin’s in Hereford, where he stood in as chaplain to the SAS and first developed an interest in military history. After leaving the church he worked on the curatorial staff of the Queen's Royal Lancers Regimental Museum, for which he remains a consultant.

He is best known for his research on the Charge of the Light Brigade, published in Hell Riders: the Truth about the Charge of the Light Brigade. He used survivors’ accounts, many of them never before published, to give the soldiers' viewpoint of this famous cavalry action. He argued that the Charge was not the military disaster it appeared, and controversially claimed that it could be considered “an astounding success”. In October 2004, on the 150th anniversary of the Charge, he broadcast an account of this action from the Crimea to the U.S. live on NPR.

Although best known for his research on the Crimean War, according to Publishers Weekly it was his later work on the Second World War generals Patton, Montgomery and Rommel that moved him “into the top rank of general audience military writers”. The book uses the personal writings of the generals to argue that the explosive relationship between the allies Patton and Montgomery had a greater effect on the conduct and course of the war than the respectful relationship between the enemies Patton and Rommel.

In October 2010 he was awarded the Imperial Service Medal.

His first novel, Hell's Mile, was published in 2020 by Hard Corps Books. According to the author, this makes good a promise he made to Richard Madeley on the British TV chat show Richard & Judy that he would “write the novel” of the Charge of the Light Brigade. The publisher adds that Hell's Mile is based on survivors' graphic accounts and is not for the faint-hearted.

In his controversial book The MAGA Offensive, published by Hard Corps Essays in September 2020, he argues that "the re-election of President Donald Trump is crucial for the survival of the real USA and the core values that define Western culture."

== Books ==
- The Last Charge: the 21st Lancers and the Battle of Omdurman (Marlborough: Crowood, 1998)
- Hell Riders: the Truth about the Charge of the Light Brigade (London: Penguin, 2004) Published in the U.S. as Hell Riders: the True Story of the Charge of the Light Brigade (New York: Henry Holt, 2004)
- Masters of Battle: Monty, Patton and Rommel at War (London: Penguin, 2008) Published in the U.S. as Patton, Montgomery, Rommel: Masters of War (New York: Random House, 2009)
- Hell's Mile (Hard Corps Books, 2020)
- The Wars of Thomas Morley: 17th Lancers and 12th Pennsylvania Cavalry (Hard Corps Books, 2020)
- Winston's Charge: Lieutenant Churchill and the British Army's Last Cavalry Charge (Hard Corps Books, 2020)
- The MAGA Offensive: Fighting for the USA (Hard Corps Essays, 2020)
