= McAuslan =

McAuslan may refer to:

- McAuslan Brewing, a brewery in Montreal, Quebec, Canada
- Cameron McAuslan (born 1998), Hong Kong cricketer

== See also ==
- McAuslan in the Rough, a short story collection by George MacDonald Fraser
