= The General Danced at Dawn =

First of three volumes of autobiographical short stories by George Macdonald Fraser

- First edition
- Author: George MacDonald Fraser
- Language: English
- Series: McAuslan stories
- Genre: Historical short stories
- Publisher: Barrie & Jenkins
- Publication date: 1970
- Publication place: United Kingdom
- Media type: Print (hardback & paperback)
- Pages: 205
- Followed by: McAuslan in the Rough

The General Danced at Dawn is a collection of short stories by George MacDonald Fraser, narrated by Lieutenant Dand MacNeill, a young officer in a fictional Scottish battalion of the British Army, part of the 51st (Highland) Infantry Division. It is a generally fond depiction of army life in the period just after World War II. It was published first during 1970. The stories were based on Fraser's own time as an officer of the Gordon Highlanders in Libya at that time.

The book was followed by two other collections of the same series: McAuslan in the Rough and The Sheikh and the Dustbin.

In the epilogue to The Sheikh and the Dustbin, Fraser identified the unnamed battalion and its colonel, and revealed that the characters and events in the stories were based on real soldiers and incidents.

== Plot summaries ==
Monsoon Selection Board: Corporal Dand MacNeill seeks to become an officer, and is examined by an officer selection board in India during the final part of World War II. Despite performing every task badly, often trying to answer cleverly and failing miserably, he is approved and commissioned due to his apparent dogged determination to complete the assault course. He perseveres in his futile attempts to cross a mud-filled ditch, although the examining officers advise him to 'call it a day' and climb out. In reality he was unwilling to finish or turn back, as he had lost his trousers while floundering in the mud, and had resolved to stay in the water to avoid embarrassment.

Silence in the Ranks: Subaltern MacNeill joins an unidentified Highland regiment as a platoon commander, and finds it difficult to conform to the regiment's family atmosphere and to identify with the men he commands. Due to missing a mess meeting he is assigned as Orderly Officer and must remain in barracks during Hogmanay (New Year's Eve), while the other officers celebrate by invitation in the Sergeants Mess. To his surprise, he is joined in his quarters by some soldiers of his platoon for drinks, song, and conversation. At the close of the evening, he learns that 'Darkie', of whom he has heard his men talk, is in fact his own affectionate nickname.

Play Up, Play Up, and Get Tore In: Dand, in his capacity as Battalion Sports Officer, takes the excellent battalion football team on tour to various British bases in the Mediterranean, ending at Malta. The team wins every match they play, even against 'The Fleet' (meaning the Royal Navy's Mediterranean Fleet) in a match organised by the over-enthusiastic Governor, who fails to recognise the disparity in resources between one infantry battalion and an entire armed service. Lieutenant Samuels, the opportunistic captain of their transport ship, tries to pass off the soldiers as a scratch team drawn from his crew and win bets on them; he almost gambles away the team's and his ship's paychest on the big match, but the money is saved by an unwitting Private McAuslan.

Wee Wullie: A long-serving, tall, incredibly strong soldier is known only as 'Wee Wullie', when off duty is frequently drunk and violent, and often ends a pass arrested by the military police. The Colonel is strangely tolerant of Wullie, however, managing to keep Wullie's breaches of discipline within the battalion where he can deal with him; and it is learned that during the war Wee Wullie showed great heroism, carrying a wounded German for days across the desert until they were both rescued. He did not receive any accolades for this act of heroism, though, as while in hospital recuperating, he got drunk, climbed onto the hospital roof, and sang "The Ball of Kirriemuir" in its entirety, after which he was arrested yet again by the redcaps. (In The Light's on at Signpost Fraser revealed that "Wullie" was based on a real soldier, whose act of heroism was not a solo march through the desert, but protecting the colonel by defying the Japanese in a POW camp.)

The General Danced at Dawn: The colonel is soon to retire, and the battalion is determined to make a good show at an upcoming inspection before he does. In the event, the inspection goes badly and 'anything that could go wrong, seemed to go wrong,' from upsetting a swill tub, to the kitchen in the enlisted men's mess catching fire, to the junior subaltern passing the port the wrong way at the dining-in. The inspecting General MacCrimmon is unimpressed with the battalion until he watches a display of the regiment's officers performing Highland dancing. He joins in, becoming more and more enthusiastic and recruiting more and more soldiers and passers-by to join, until by dawn the next morning, a crowd of Highlanders, Fusiliers who share the base with the Highlanders, some military policemen, members of the local populace, an Italian cafe proprietor, a few Senussi Arabs in burnouses, and three German prisoners of war make history by dancing 'a one hundred and twenty-eightsome reel'. The General's inspection report "congratulated the battalion, and highly commended the pipe-sergeant on the standard of the officers' dancing." The pipey's opinion was that as a dancer, the General was "no' bad ... for a Campbell." (Note: Campbells have been distrusted and disliked in some parts of Scottish society ever since their part in the Massacre of Glencoe of 1692 – "never trust a Campbell".)

Night Run to Palestine: MacNeill, on detached service in Egypt, misses his flight to return to the battalion. While he waits for the next one, he is made commander of an overnight troop train to Jerusalem. As well as keeping watch for Zionist saboteurs and snipers, he has to deal with an interfering lieutenant colonel, a group of innocent young ATS women, a chaplain concerned for their moral safety, and a soldier of the Arab Legion who locks himself in a lavatory, among other things. He gets his train to Jerusalem in one piece, despite the interference of the colonel, before returning to Egypt and a farcical court of inquiry which at great length determines that he missed his original flight back from Egypt, hence his presence there; and that he must therefore catch the next flight out.

The Whisky and the Music: Invited as a guest to the sergeants' mess by the battalion's signals sergeant, Dand MacNeill learns a little something of his own past – specifically, that his great-uncle, who had been with the regiment at the beginning of the 20th century, had once been pipe-sergeant of the battalion. He also learns some regimental lore concerning the legendary Piper George Findlater, VC. At the Battle of Dargai in Afghanistan, Findlater played the regimental march "Cock o' the North" while the bullets whistled around him, inspiring the regiment to capture the Dargai Heights ... or was it a different march?

Guard at the Castle: MacNeill's battalion has been transferred home to Scotland, to Edinburgh to be exact. Royalty is coming to town and it has been decided to have a Scottish outfit provide the ceremonial guard for Edinburgh Castle. The Colonel selects MacNeill to command this ceremonial guard mount. MacNeill and the Regimental Sergeant Major select the five members of the guard detail; rehearse them to perfection; ensure they are well-equipped—and then, due to a last-minute accident with a bucket of paint, are forced to replace one of the spiffy guards with the scruffy Private McAuslan, the dirtiest soldier in the world.

McAuslan's Court-Martial: While Lieutenant MacNeill is acting company commander, Private McAuslan is charged with disobedience of a direct order by a newly promoted, officious corporal. A man of principle, McAuslan believes that being ordered to enter the pillow fight at the Army's Highland Division Games is an illegal order. The pillow fight is fought while astride greased poles over a canvas water tank until one combatant is knocked into the water. Corporal Baxter had told McAuslan that he "needed a damned good wash, and this way [he'd] get one." Refusing company punishment, McAuslan demanded, as was his right, to be "marched" – taken before the battalion's newly assigned commanding officer, because he believed he was not being punished justly. Refusing to accept the new colonel's award of punishment, in accordance with the formula, "Will you accept my award or go before a court-martial?" McAuslan chooses the latter. It looks grim for The Dirtiest Soldier in the World, but Captain Einstein, the "prisoner's friend" assigned to defend him, is a resourceful man.

== Proposed film ==
During the early 1970s, Fraser adapted the stories into a screenplay "at the request of a rather eccentric Scots-American entrepreneur" but the project "died some distance short of pre-production."

== The Dirtiest Soldier in the World ==
"The General Danced at Dawn"
- Comedy Playhouse episode
- Episode no.: Season 12; Episode 4
- Directed by: Michael Mills
- Written by: David Climie
- Based on: "Guard at the Castle" by George MacDonald Fraser
- Original air date: 27 March 1972
- Running time: 30 mins

Guest appearances
- John Standing as Lt Dand Macneil; Freddie Earlle as Pte McAuslan; Jack Watson as RSM Mackintosh; Moray Watson as CSM; Allan Cuthbertson as Col Gordon; Ben Aris as the Adjutant; Andrew Downie as Major Chisholm; Jay Neill as Sergeant of the Guard; Stephen Temperley as Corporal of the Guard; Kevin Moran as Pte MacFarlane; Christopher Holmes as Pte MacDonald; Clive Woodward as Pte Hobbs; Ricky Newby as Pte Fraser; Ben Gaule as Ben Gaule; Pauline Crow as the Duchess; George Robb as the Duke

Guard at the Castle was adapted by David Climie into a 30-minute television special for Comedy Playhouse, named The Dirtiest Soldier in the World, which was broadcast in 1972 by BBC1. Michael Mills produced.

It was a proposed pilot for a television series; however, no series resulted. However, the TV play was repeated in 1973.

=== Reception ===
The Guardian "the comedy worked... I remember with gentle pleasure McAuslan's salute."

The Leicester Mercury said "moments of this were among the most hilarious I have seen on television."
