= The Sheikh and the Dustbin =

1988 book by George MacDonald Fraser

- First edition
- Author: George MacDonald Fraser
- Language: English
- Series: McAuslan
- Genre: short stories
- Publisher: Collins/Harvill
- Publication date: 1988
- Publication place: United Kingdom

The Sheikh and the Dustbin is the third and last collection of short stories by George MacDonald Fraser, featuring a young Scottish officer named Dand MacNeill. It is a sequel to The General Danced at Dawn and McAuslan in the Rough and concerns life in a Highland Regiment after the end of the Second World War.

== Plot Summaries ==
The Servant Problem. Lieutenant MacNeill, having been overseas much longer than the other junior officers of the battalion due to his prior enlisted service, is sent home from North Africa on Leave In Advance of Python, "Python" being the code word for demobilization. As was the custom of the time, he visited the families of a number of his fellow officers and the men of his platoon, telling the families about their sons, husbands, and brothers. Along the way, he muses about being looked after by servants, his grandmother running a Highland lodge with a large staff of servants, and his own experiences with the batmen he has had since becoming an officer candidate and a commissioned officer.

Captain Errol. Just assigned to the battalion as the Intelligence Officer, Captain Errol — not his real name, but rather a reflection of the fact he bears a passing resemblance to Errol Flynn in physical appearance, and more than a passing resemblance to him in his personal mannerisms, panache, and style — is what the Jocks refer to as a "gallus man," someone who is simultaneously an extrovert, indifferent to his effect on others, and reckless. Highly decorated, he holds both a Military Cross and a Military Medal, as well as Balkan decorations for valor and several campaign stars and medals. He started the war as a commissioned officer, was broken to the ranks by court-martial, and subsequently was re-commissioned for outstanding service. Master of all the military arts, he is a sniper-grade marksman, expert in infiltration, a wizard at hand-to-hand combat, and an outstanding observer of the human condition and the psychology of command, yet he is an enigma. Like George Patton or Chesty Puller, Errol is one of those rare men born to excel as warriors. Worshiped by some, despised by others, regarded by a few as a menace to be avoided at all costs, he proves himself to Dand MacNeill and the other officers when the battalion is called on to assist the civil authorities when an Arab nationalist demagogue whips up a riot in the Suk and sends it against the modern town outside the walls of the Old City.

The Constipation of O'Brien. Following an Army Education session in which MacNeill teaches all of his men how to read a compass and a map, he is sucked into bets with half the mess that his men, dropped by pairs out of enclosed trucks along the Mediterranean coast at night, cannot reach a selected point within a reasonable time. And specifically, that Private McAuslan, the British Army's answer to Peking Man, cannot do it. Plus which, to make life more interesting, the Royal Artillery will be providing an opposing force that the Jocks have to sneak past. And just to make it more interesting yet, the Colonel puts a bet on with the Gunners' C.O. that his Highlanders will be able to extinguish a lantern on a bridge that is "home base" without being detected.

The Sheikh and the Dustbin. The battalion is tasked with keeping Suleiman bin Aziz, a notorious native brigand who has been at war with the French his entire life, secure until the French colonial authorities can take custody of him and ship him off to Devil's Island. The dignified, perpetually smouldering sheikh quickly earns the respect and affection of the Scots, especially after hearing the pipes and connecting the sound with the legendary soldier of fortune Sir Harry MacLean, who had been commander of the Sultan of Morocco's army. But before being taken away by the French, bin Aziz gives the Colonel a most precious gift.

McAuslan, Lance-Corporal. The rank of Lance-Corporal in the British Army was described by Rudyard Kipling as being "... 'arf o' nothin', an' all a private yet," but a lance-jack is the one who is in charge of details or a squad in the absence of the real non-commissioned officers. A Brigadier who had been present on the occasion of McAuslan's answering an utterly improbable question about soccer encounters him on fatigues, remembers him, and promotes him to lance-corporal. Hilarity ensues.

The Gordon Women. Dand MacNeill's aunt owns Wade's House, named after the British general who built the first road system north of the border with England through Scotland. Now a hotel, she is still Lady of the Manor of the estate that the family owns. While officer-in-charge of a detail transferring ammunition and explosives about in a deuce-and-a-half truck, Dand MacNeill stops to visit his aunt and rest his men—and finds himself stuck in the middle of a battle of wits between local stillers, poachers, the Excisemen who are out to catch the illegal makers of the malt whisky, and members of the local gentry who want to catch both the stillers and the poachers — plus, of course, the contribution to the chaos of the inimitable Private McAuslan.

Ye Mind Jie Dee, Fletcher? Dand MacNeill muses over the fortunes, mostly ill fortunes, of the Scottish national soccer team in the 1978 World Cup tournament in which Scotland was clobbered by Peru 3–1, drew against Iran, and suffered the indignity of having a player sent home on drug violations. He imagines the debacle being analyzed by Privates McAuslan and Fletcher in Glesca dialect.

Extraduction. George MacDonald Fraser retracts the statement he made in the introduction to The General Danced at Dawn, in which he said that the battalion in which MacNeill, McAuslan, Wee Wullie and the rest served never existed, and that the characters themselves were fictitious. He goes on to tell the story of meeting the Colonel at a book-signing, reminiscing with him over drinks afterwards, and being astonished when the Colonel correctly names the two Jocks whose composite is the infamous Private McAuslan. He also at the very end identifies his allegedly fictional battalion as the Second Battalion of the Gordon Highlanders, and the supposedly fictional Colonel who had commanded it (and him) as Lieutenant Colonel R.G. "Reggie" Lees.
