= Arch of the Philaeni =

Monument in Libya (1937–1970s)

- Arco dei Fileni (Italian); Arae Philaenorum (Latin)
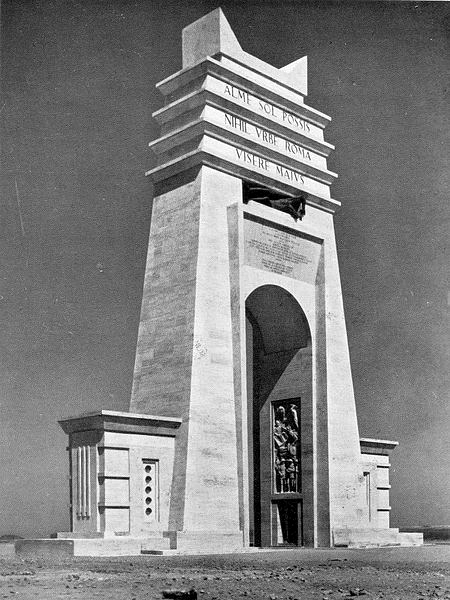
- Arch of the Philaeni in March 1937
- Interactive map of the Arch of the Philaeni area
- Alternative names: Marble Arch al-Qaws (Arabic)

General information
- Status: Demolished
- Type: Triumphal arch
- Architectural style: Modernist
- Location: Ras Lanuf, Libya
- Coordinates: 30°19′57″N 18°46′53″E
- Construction started: 1 August 1936
- Inaugurated: 15 March 1937
- Demolished: Early 1970s

Height
- Height: 31 m (102 ft)

Technical details
- Material: Concrete, travertine

Design and construction
- Architect: Florestano Di Fausto

The Arch of the Philaeni, (Note: Italian: Arco dei Fileni; Latin: Arae Philaenorum. Also known locally in Arabic as al-Qaws (القوس; 'The Arch').) also nicknamed the Marble Arch, was a triumphal arch built in 1937 by Fascist Italy in colonial Libya. Located on the border between the previously-separate colonies of Italian Tripolitania and Cyrenaica, the arch was built to celebrate their unification into a single colony; it also celebrated the completion of the Litoranea, the first road connecting the east and west of Libya, which passed underneath the arch at the middle of its length.

Designed by leading colonial architect Florestano Di Fausto and incorporating various stylistic influences from classical antiquity, the arch was a prominent symbol of the Italian Empire, designed to evoke a connection between the civilizations of the ancient Mediterranean, especially the Roman Empire, and the ideological goals of Fascism. The eponymous Carthaginian Philaeni brothers, who according to legend were voluntarily buried alive near the site in order to secure a favourable border settlement, were promoted as an example of Fascist virtue: two bronze statues depicting their deaths were incorporated into the arch, which also featured sculpted reliefs and Latin inscriptions glorifying Fascist Italy.

The arch survived World War II, during which the Litoranea was the main east-west route used by the Allied and Axis armies of the Western Desert campaign; British soldiers of the former gave the arch its nickname. It was eventually demolished by Muammar Gaddafi, ruler of the Libyan Arab Republic, in the early 1970s.

== Background ==
=== Legend of the Philaeni brothers ===
During antiquity, the two North African states of Carthage, expanding eastwards into Tripolitania, and Greek Cyrene, expanding south and west from Cyrenaica, feuded over territory and sought to define the border between them. According to a legend first described by the Roman historian Sallust, in either the fifth or fourth century BCE, the two states decided to set the border with an athletics competition: two teams of runners would depart simultaneously from their respective states and the boundary placed where they met. When they did meet, the Philaeni brothers, representing Carthage, had travelled far further than the team from Cyrene. Defeated, the Cyrenaeans accused the Carthaginians of cheating, but agreed to set the boundary at the meeting point on the condition that the Philaeni brothers were buried alive there. The Carthaginians later built altars – the Arae Philaenorum – on the site of the brothers' deaths. The supposed location of the altars, near the southernmost part of the Gulf of Sidra, became the boundary between the regions of Tripolitania and Cyrenaica.

=== Italian colonization ===
Map of the traditional regions of Libya

In 1911, the Kingdom of Italy, aiming to expand its colonial empire and to strengthen its position in the Mediterranean, invaded Ottoman Tripolitania, starting the Italo-Turkish War. Though the territory was granted to Italy in the 1912 Treaty of Lausanne, by late 1915 strong native resistance and the outbreak of World War I had reduced Italian-held territory to only the coastal towns, a situation that persisted after the end of WW1. Internal conflicts – particularly between notables of the Tripolitanian Republic and the Cyrenaica-based Senussi Order – and wartime competition between the Ottoman and Italian empires seriously destabilized Libyan society and caused ruptures between the western and eastern halves of the country. From 1922, Italy, predominantly under the Fascist government of Benito Mussolini, waged a war to pacify Libya and to fully occupy the colony. Italy's campaign to defeat the native resistance, characterized by escalating brutality against the civilian population, was complete by 1932; victory was declared by General Pietro Badoglio on 24 January.

Following the defeat of the resistance, Fascist Italy undertook a program of settler colonization, aiming to Italianize the north of the colony and integrate it into metropolitan Italy as the country's "Fourth Shore". Under Governor Italo Balbo, in 1934 the two colonial administrations of Italian Tripolitania and Cyrenaica were merged into one, named Italian Libya, and began extensive infrastructure projects to support Italian settlement. These projects included construction of the Litoranea, a 1,822 km (1,132 mi) long paved highway along the entire Libyan coastline, the first road to connect Cyrenaica and Tripolitania. The highway's construction was justified by contemporaries as a symbol of the colony's unification in service of economic, cultural, and especially military objectives. The completion of the highway, particularly the section through the harsh Sirte desert, is seen by modern historians, such as John Wright and Rose Parfitt, as one of Fascist Italy's most significant achievements.

== The arch ==
=== Design and construction ===
To celebrate the completion of the Litoranea, and the unification and "rebirth" of Libya as part of the Fascist empire, the Arch of the Philaeni was built at the midway-point of the highway and served as its centrepiece. The location, near Ras Lanuf on the Gulf of Sidra, was some 30 km (19 mi) west of the purported site of the ancient Carthaginian altars. It was designed by architect Florestano Di Fausto, one of the most prominent figures in Italian colonial architecture. Di Fausto, a modernist and proponent of Mediterraneanism, used the fusion of Italian and local vernacular architecture in his designs as a manifestation of Italy's presence in and connection to the land being colonized; he saw the triumphal arch as an especially Roman and Italian construction. It was not the first triumphal arch built under Fascism in Italian Libya: two temporary arches had been constructed in Tripoli in 1928 and 1931 by Alessandro Limongelli and Carlo Enrico Rava respectively.

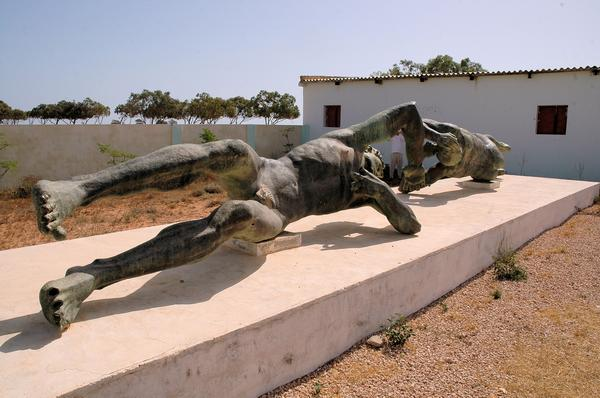
Bronze statues of the Philaeni brothers, 2014

Construction began on 1 August 1936, required 200 workers, and was completed in February 1937. The arch, which straddled the Litoranea, was 31 m (102 ft) tall, with an opening 16 m (52 ft) high and 6.5 m (21 ft) wide. It was built of concrete and clad with 350 tonnes of travertine, a material used extensively in Ancient Roman architecture, imported from Tivoli, Italy. (Note: Kenrick 2009, p. 154; Parfitt 2018, p. 517. For the use of travertine in Ancient Rome, see Pentecost 2005, pp. 323–328) Alongside the Roman elements, Egyptian, Hellenistic, and Phoenician motifs were used in the design, symbolic of Fascism's claim to the legacy of classical Mediterranean civilization as a whole. Two large bronze sculptures, each showing one of the Philaeni brothers being buried alive, were placed in rectangular recesses above the openings on each side of the arch. On the inside faces of the arch were two carved bas-relief panels: the first showed the building of the highway, featuring land surveyors, Arab workers, construction machinery, and a caravan carrying barrels of water to the worksite; the second, themed around the Italian Empire, featured Mussolini saluting King Victor Emmanuel III in front of a group of soldiers, as well as depictions of agriculture, the monumented hills of Rome, and trumpeting angels. Inscribed in Latin on the east-facing side of the three-tiered attic was a quote popular during the Fascist era, taken from the Roman poet Horace's Carmen Saeculare and originally written in praise of Emperor Augustus:

Alme Sol possis nihil Urbe Roma visere maius
Nourishing sun, may you see nothing greater than the city of Rome

Augustus, as the founder of the Roman Empire and inaugurator of the Pax Romana, was an inspiration for Mussolini, keen to emulate Roman empire-building and bring about his own "Pax Fascista" in Libya and the Mediterranean. The bimillennium of Augustus' birth was widely celebrated in Fascist Italy throughout 1937; alongside the Arch of the Philaeni, other projects to co-opt his image and suggest parallels to Mussolini included the restoration of the Ara Pacis and the removal of the Obelisk of Axum to Rome. Two further inscriptions, composed by the journalist Nello Quilici, were carved in both Latin and Italian. The first described the monument as a symbol of culture and civilization, presenting it as a gift given to the people of Libya and the world under the auspices of a Roman Empire reborn by Fascism; the second described the legend of the Philaeni brothers, omitting their status as Carthaginians, and portrayed Fascist Italy as the vindicator of their sacrifices. Contemporary Fascist interpretations, such as those given by Balbo or the writer Rino Alessi, varied regarding the use of a myth valorizing two Carthaginians – Rome's ancient enemy during the Punic Wars – on a monument meant to emphasize the Roman-ness (romanità) of Fascist Italy. The deaths of the brothers were taken simply as an exaltation of imperial conquest, or were abstracted, being shown as an example of a generic, "universal" heroic virtue, emblematic of the "New Fascist Men" willing to sacrifice their lives in the service of Fascism.

=== Inauguration ===
Inauguration of the arch took place on 15 March 1937 during an official visit by Mussolini to the colony. The trip was made to honour the work of Balbo, to receive the Sword of Islam in a gesture of fraternity towards the population of Libya and the wider Arab world, and to declare that Italy had peaceful, non-expansionist intentions to the great powers, who were fearful of further warmongering in the wake of the invasion of Ethiopia. Taking place at dusk, with native Libyan troops lining the road to welcome Mussolini's convoy, the arch was surrounded with flaming tripods, lit up by spotlights, and overflown by aircraft. At the provided seven-course banquet dinner, described by an attending journalist as "like finding a bunch of roses at the North Pole", guests were especially impressed by the inclusion of fresh raw vegetables taken from the gardens of Italian settlers. The ceremony was meant to parallel the richness of Roman Libya and emphasize Fascism's mission to transform and civilize the desert of the colony.

As one of Libya's most prominent tourist attractions during the colonial period, images of the arch appeared on postcards, guidebooks, and in propaganda. Despite the arch becoming an icon of the Fascist empire, few tourists actually visited in person.

=== Later history ===
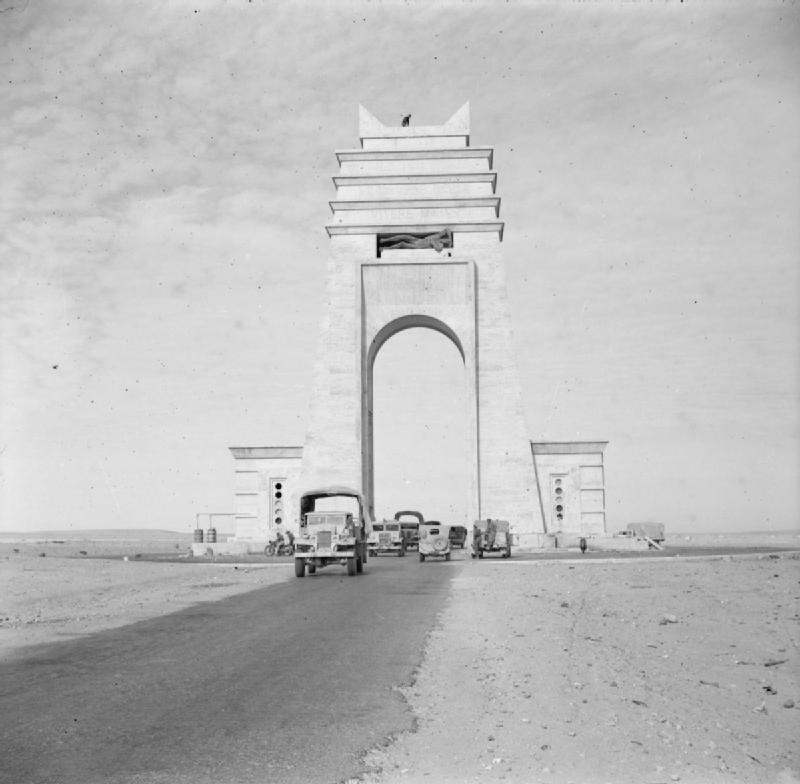
British troops at the arch, December 1942

During the Western Desert campaign of World War II, the Litoranea was the main route used to transport troops and equipment through Libya. The British Long Range Desert Group were able to find a route into Libya through the Great Sand Sea – thought by the Axis to be impassable – in order to observe and disrupt Axis forces on the road. From a site 8 km (5.0 mi) east of the arch, traffic was watched, recorded, and transmitted back to Middle East Command from 2 March until 21 July 1942, when the Axis capture of Tobruk allowed materiel to be sent directly to Cyrenaica. The watch at the arch was briefly resumed from 30 October to 15 November 1942 during the Axis retreat after the Second Battle of El Alamein. The monument – nicknamed the "Marble Arch" by British troops – and its adjacent airfield were captured by the 2nd New Zealand Division on 17 December 1942. (Note: Stevens 1962, pp. 59–60. For the nickname given by British troops, see St. John 2011, p. 11.)

Following the country's independence from Italy and the establishment of the Kingdom of Libya in 1951, the arch's Latin inscription was replaced with one in Arabic, written by Libyan poet Ahmed Rafiq al-Mahdawi:

The aggressors constructed a building aspiring to immortalize Rome, but the will of God for them was to be defeated and fallen. What did Rome have to do with these people of Arab origins, people who believed in the best man ever [Mohammad] and followed his rightful path. This is my homeland protected by Islam's guidance, and the call for the prayer 'Allahu Akbar' is echoing in its horizons.

Muammar Gaddafi, who had come to power in the 1969 Libyan revolution and considered the landmark an unwelcome symbol of Italian colonialism, demolished the arch in the early 1970s. (Note: Sources vary on the year of demolition: Kenrick 2009, p. 155 states 1972; Parfitt 2018, p. 511 states 1974. See Agbamu 2024, p. 237 n. 144.) By 2009, little visible remained of the arch's foundations. Prior to demolition, the bas-reliefs and bronze statues were removed to a museum at Madina Sultan, near Sirte. They remain there, in poor condition, as of 2024.

== See also ==
- Bolzano Victory Monument, a similar triumphal arch built by Fascist Italy in Bolzano, South Tyrol
- "Bo Geesty" ("Beau Geste"), a short story by George MacDonald Fraser in which soldiers get stuck when climbing to the summit of the monument; collected in McAuslan in the Rough, 1974
