= George Findlater =

Scottish soldier (1872–1942)

George Frederick Findlater
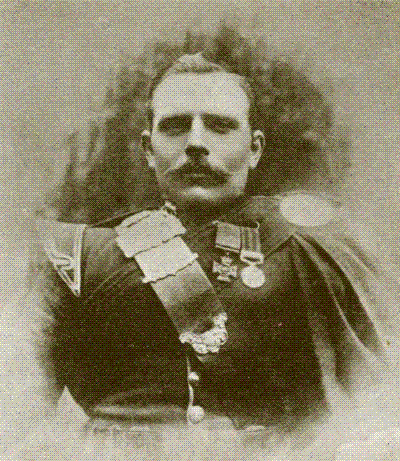
- Findlater in 1898
- Born: 15 February 1872; Turriff, Aberdeenshire
- Died: 4 March 1942 (aged 70); Turriff
- Burial place: Forglen Cemetery, near Turriff
- Military career
- Allegiance: United Kingdom
- Branch: British Army
- Service years: 1888–1898; 1914–1915
- Rank: Sergeant Piper
- Units: Gordon Highlanders
- Conflicts: Chitral Expedition; Tirah Campaign; World War I
- Awards: Victoria Cross

Sergeant Piper George Frederick Findlater VC (16 February 1872 – 4 March 1942) was a Scottish soldier in the British Army, who was awarded the Victoria Cross, Britain's highest award for gallantry, for his role in the Tirah Campaign. On 20 October 1897, Findlater, then a junior piper in the Gordon Highlanders, was shot in the ankles during an advance against opposing defences at the Battle of the Dargai Heights; unable to walk, and exposed to enemy fire, he continued playing, to encourage the battalion's advance. The event was widely covered in the press, making Findlater a public hero.

After receiving the Victoria Cross, Findlater supplemented his Army pension by performing at music halls, much to the outrage of the military establishment, but after a growing scandal he retired to take up farming in Banffshire in 1899. In 1914, he re-enlisted in the Gordon Highlanders for the First World War; he served as the senior piper for the 9th Battalion until the end of 1915, when he returned home because of ill health. Active in a local pipe band, he continued to farm until his death in 1942, aged 70.

== Early life ==
Findlater was born in 1872 at Turriff, Aberdeenshire, one of eleven children of Alexander Findlater, a miller, and his wife, Mary Ann Clark. He attended the school in Turriff but left at a young age to work as a farm labourer; under the law then in force, children were permitted to leave school at thirteen. Two months after his sixteenth birthday, on 7 April 1888, he travelled to Aberdeen and enlisted in the 2nd Battalion, Gordon Highlanders. The battalion was posted to Ceylon, where in 1891 he transferred to the 1st Battalion, then serving on the North-West Frontier of British India, now part of Pakistan. He first saw active combat there in March 1895, at the Malakand Pass, where he was hit but not wounded; later in the year, he served with the relief force in the Chitral Expedition.

In December 1896 he was appointed as a piper in the battalion's band. The Gordons, in common with other Highland regiments of the time, maintained a pipe band in each battalion for both ceremonial and military purposes; the pipers were trained infantrymen, and accompanied the main force on operations. The following year, the 1st Battalion was assigned as part of the force for the Tirah campaign, an expedition into the mountains to secure the Khyber Pass and the northern approaches to India.

== Dargai Heights ==
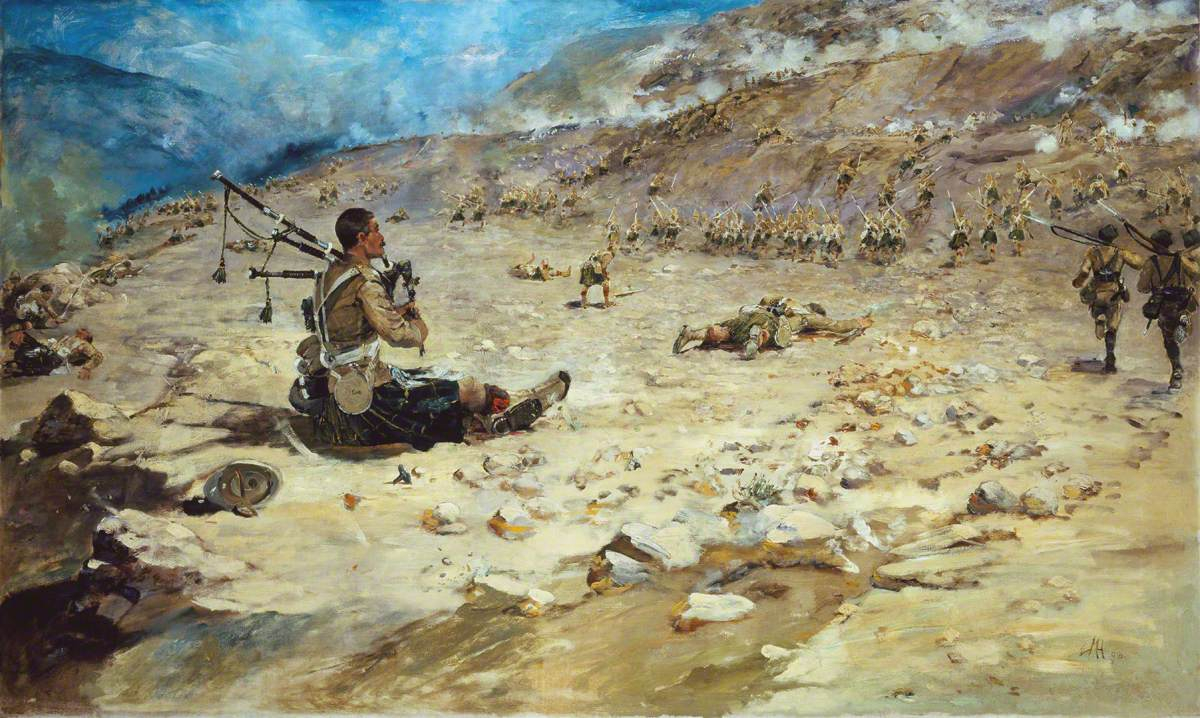
An artist's illustration of Findlater's winning of the Victoria Cross

On 20 October 1897, an attempt by a British force to take the strongly held Dargai Heights was beaten back, leaving three battalions pinned down under heavy fire from above and unable to withdraw. They were reinforced by the 1st Gordons, who were ordered to advance through the open ground and storm the heights, led by their five pipers. Findlater was wounded before reaching the hillside, with a superficial wound to his left foot and a broken right ankle. Unable to walk, he pulled himself to a boulder, propped himself up, and continued to play to encourage the advance. The infantry following behind successfully reached the hillside, climbed the heights, and dispersed the defenders. All observers agreed on the basics of the story, but the exact details of what happened were somewhat confused. The initial press reports describing the "wounded piper" took him to be Patrick Milne, the senior piper, and playing Cock o' the North, the regimental march. It was quickly discovered that Milne had been unable to play – he had been wounded in the chest – and that Findlater had been the man involved, playing The Haughs O' Cromdale. This was perhaps a more appropriate tune; not only was it a quicker and livelier strathspey, but the content fitted the situation. The Battle of Cromdale had seen a wounded Jacobite piper perch on a rock and play his comrades into battle, and the traditional ballad itself described how "the Gordons boldly did advance ... upon the Haughs o' Cromdale".

Findlater was evacuated to Rawalpindi where he was treated, and unable to continue in the Army as a result of his injuries, he was sent to Netley Hospital to convalesce. It was announced in May 1898 that he would receive the Victoria Cross, one of four men to be so honoured for actions at Dargai, and was personally decorated by Queen Victoria at Netley on 14 May, a few days before he was formally discharged from the Army.

'During the attack on the Dargai Heights on 20 October 1897, Piper Findlater, after being shot through both feet and unable to stand, sat up, under a heavy fire, playing the Regimental March to encourage the charge of the Gordon Highlanders.'

== Public celebrity ==
The Gordons' charge at Dargai had caught the imagination of the British public, and the romantic description of the wounded piper encouraging his comrades on was perhaps the most famous element of it. Whilst recovering, Findlater received a large number of public donations, including sets of bagpipes, and by at least one account, a proposal of marriage. The public interest increased sharply after he was awarded the Victoria Cross, and to supplement his Army pension Findlater arranged to appear at the Military Tournament, where he drew large crowds; for just thirty performances, he was paid two-thirds as much as his annual Army pension of £46. He then began to perform at music halls, first at the London Alhambra and then nationally, with his earnings climbing as high as £100 a week.

Whilst popular with the crowds, Findlater was seen by many of the military establishment as deliberately profiting from the Victoria Cross. The War Office approached the management of the Alhambra to try and stop his performance, without success, sparking counter-criticism as to whether the Army had any standing to control the private engagements of a man who had already left the Army. Within the year, however, his fame began to turn sour; he was implicated in a contentious breach of promise lawsuit in late 1898, which led to heckling at his Scottish performances, and to avoid further scandal left the country to tour the United States and Canada.

== Later life ==
Following his return from North America, Findlater married his cousin Helen at Turriff in August 1899. A year later, he took up the tenancy of a farm at Forglen, where he and Helen settled to begin a family; they would have five children, two sons and three daughters.

At the start of the First World War, Findlater re-enlisted in the Army, returning to his old regiment. He was posted to the 9th Battalion of the Gordons, a New Army battalion in 15th (Scottish) Division, where he was appointed as the sergeant piper (or pipe major), the battalion's senior piper. He served with the regiment through its first year in France, including the Battle of Loos, before being invalided home in December 1915. He continued to farm at Forglen, and was a member of the local pipe band at Turriff; from 1927 to 1940 he served as its pipe major. He died in early 1942, shortly after his seventieth birthday, of a heart attack.

== Legacy ==
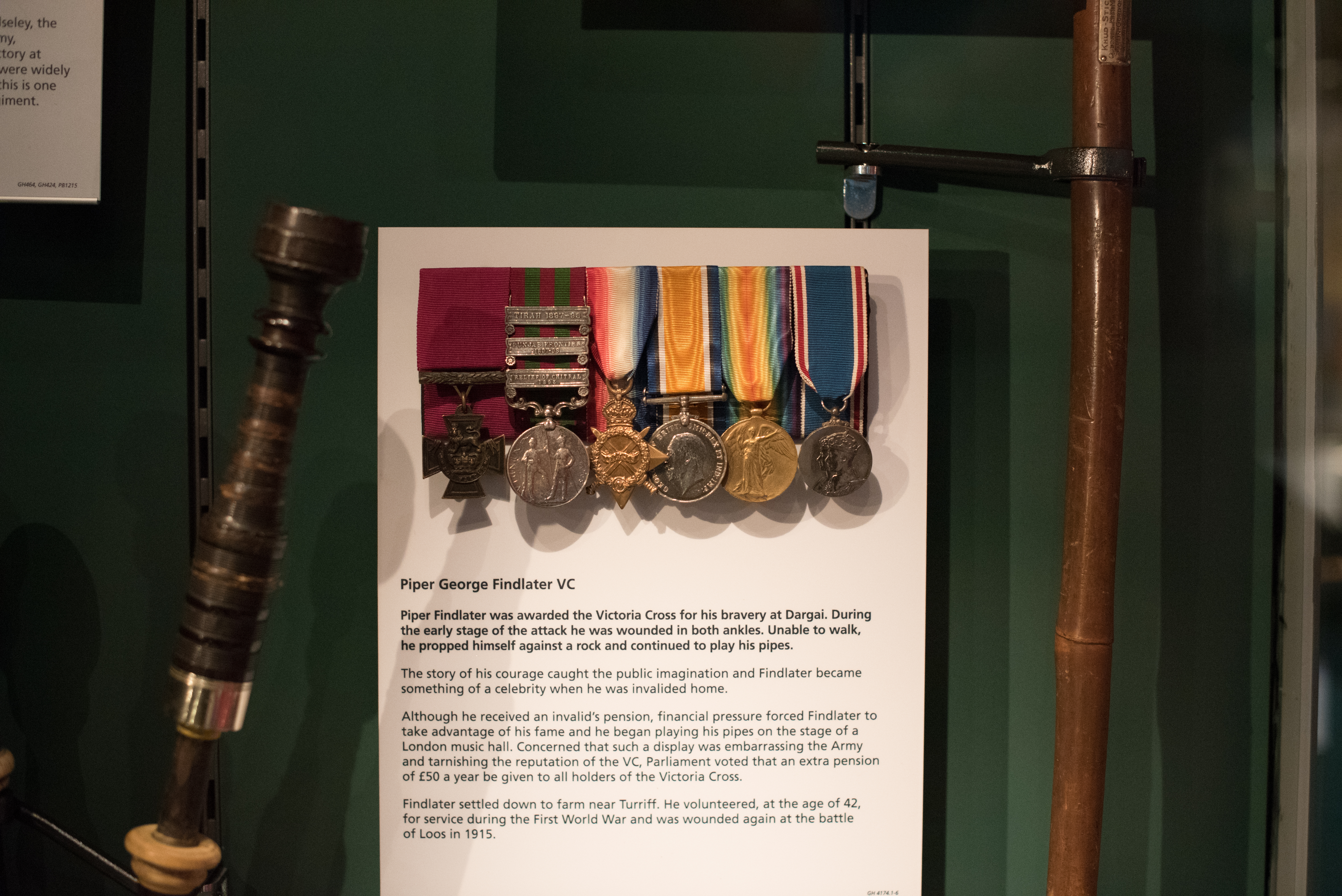
The medals awarded to Findlater on display at the Gordon Highlanders Museum, 2017

Whilst his moment of personal celebrity was fleeting, Findlater remained a popular figure in the public memory, continuing to be a subject of artwork and stories for some years. He was the focal point of Edward Hale's painting Piper Findlater winning the VC (1897), Stanley Berkeley's Charge of the Gordon Highlanders (1897), Vereker Hamilton's Piper Findlater at Dargai (1898), Richard Caton Woodville's The Storming of Dargai Heights (1898) and Robert Gibb's Dargai (1909). Findlater's playing at Dargai, along with the charge itself, became one of the more well-remembered moments of the Gordons' regimental history; they later applied for the Dargai Heights to be recognised as a battle honour, the only one of the nine participating regiments to do so, but were declined.

One of the "Dand MacNeil" stories in George MacDonald Fraser's The General Danced at Dawn concerns an animated discussion in the Sergeants Mess concerning exactly what tune Piper Findlater did play at the Dargai Heights, Findlater himself not being positive what it had been.

== See also ==
- Bill Millin, a piper who played during the D-Day landings in 1944
- Daniel Laidlaw, awarded the Victoria Cross for piping his battalion forward at the Battle of Loos in 1915
