= No. 318 Polish Fighter-Reconnaissance Squadron =

No. 318 "City of Gdańsk" Polish Fighter-Reconnaissance Squadron
- Badge of 318 "City of Gdansk" Polish Fighter-Reconnaissance Squadron during World War II
- Active: 20 March 1943 – 12 December 1946
- Country: United Kingdom
- Allegiance: (Poland) Polish Government in exile
- Branch: Royal Air Force
- Role: Tactical Reconnaissance
- Part of: RAF Army Cooperation Command, March – May 1943; RAF Second Tactical Air Force, June – August 1943; Mediterranean Air Command, September – December 1943; Mediterranean Allied Air Forces, December 1943 – July 1945; RAF Mediterranean and Middle East, August 1945 – August 1946
- Nickname: Danzig "Gdański" (of Gdańsk)
- Engagements: World War II

Insignia
- Squadron Badge heraldry: Unofficial design, based on the coat of arms city of Gdańsk
- Squadron Codes: LW (November 1944 – August 1946)

Aircraft flown
- Fighter: Hawker Hurricane; Supermarine Spitfire

Squadron emblem painted on the aircraft

No. 318 "City of Gdańsk" Polish Fighter-Reconnaissance Squadron (Polish: 318 Dywizjon Myśliwsko-Rozpoznawczy Gdański") was a Polish tactical reconnaissance aircraft squadron formed in Great Britain as part of an agreement between the Polish Government in Exile and the United Kingdom in 1940. It was one of 15 squadrons of the Polish Air Force in exile that served alongside the Royal Air Force (RAF) in World War II.

== History ==
=== Formation and training ===
The squadron was formed on 20 March 1943 at RAF Detling, Kent from personnel of No. 309 Squadron and after training with Hawker Hurricane Mk.Is it moved to the Middle East, operating from RAF Muqeibila and RAF Gaza and continuing its training, specifically with II Corps of the Polish Army, by now using Hurricane Mk.IIBs. Training went on until 1944, when the squadron converted to Supermarine Spitfires.

=== Operations in Italy ===
The squadron was then involved in ground attack and tactical reconnaissance operations over Italy in support of the Eighth Army following the allied advance; and saw action at the Battle of Monte Cassino. After hostilities ceased the squadron remained in Italy for another year, but on 15 August 1946 it handed over its aircraft and left Italy for the UK, where it arrived on the 19th. Soon after, the squadron disbanded at RAF Coltishall, according to some sources on 31 August 1946, while others mention 12 December 1946.

== Aircraft operated ==
Aircraft operated by No. 318 Squadron RAF
From	To	Aircraft	Version
April 1943	August 1943	Hawker Hurricane	Mk.I
September 1943	March 1944	Hawker Hurricane	Mk.IIb
March 1944	March 1945	Supermarine Spitfire	Mk.Vb
March 1944	March 1945	Supermarine Spitfire	Mk.Vc
September 1944	August 1946	Supermarine Spitfire	Mk.IX

== Squadron bases ==
Bases and airfields used by No. 318 Squadron RAF
From	To	Base	Remark
20 March 1943	15 August 1943	RAF Detling, Kent	dets. at RAF Weston Zoyland, Somerset and RAF Snailwell, Cambridgeshire from April 1943
15 August 1943	31 August 1943	En route	to Egypt
31 August 1943	10 September 1943	Alamaza, Egypt	
10 September 1943	13 October 1943	RAF Muqueibila, Palestine	
13 October 1943	22 October 1943	RAF Gaza, Palestine	
22 October 1943	21 November 1943	RAF Lydda, Palestine	(now Ben Gurion International Airport)
21 November 1943	23 April 1944	LG.207 (Qassassin), Egypt	Ground echelon to Italy from 9 April
23 April 1944	24 April 1944	RAF Helwan, Egypt	
24 April 1944	25 April 1944	RAF Marble Arch, Libya	
25 April 1944	28 April 1944	RAF Castel Benito, Libya	
28 April 1944	1 May 1944	Madna, Italy	
1 May 1944	17 June 1944	Trigno, Italy	
17 June 1944	26 June 1944	San Vito, Italy	
26 June 1944	2 July 1944	Tortoretto, Italy	
2 July 1944	30 July 1944	Fermio, Italy	det. at Castiglione, Italy
30 July 1944	24 August 1944	Falconara, Italy	
24 August 1944	31 August 1944	Chiaravalle, Italy	det. at Malignano, Italy
31 August 1944	16 September 1944	Piagiolino, Italy	
16 September 1944	27 September 1944	Cassandro, Italy	
27 September 1944	6 November 1944	Rimini, Italy	Det. at Iesi, Italy
6 November 1944	4 December 1944	Bellaria, Italy	
4 December 1944	3 May 1945	Forli, Italy	
3 May 1945	6 May 1945	La Russia, Italy	
6 May 1945	14 May 1945	Treviso, Italy	
14 May-	21 August 1945	Tissano, Italy	
21 August 1945	24 January 1946	Lavariano, Italy	
24 January	9 March 1946	Tissano, Italy	
9 March 1946	15 August 1946	Treviso, Italy	
15 August 1946	19 August 1946	En route	to the UK
19 August 1946	12 December 1946	RAF Coltishall, Norfolk	

== Commanding officers ==
Officers commanding No. 318 Squadron RAF
From	To	Name
20 March 1943	5 August 1943	W/Cdr. A. Wojtyga
5 August 1943	5 January 1945	W/Cdr. L. Wielochowski
5 January 1945	20 May 1946	W/Cdr. S. Mosczynski, DFC
20 May 1946	12 December 1946	S/Ldr. W. Bereżecki

== See also ==
- Polish Air Forces in France and Great Britain
- Military history of Poland during World War II
