= RAF Marble Arch =

Former Royal Air Force station in Ras Lanuf, Libya

RAF Marble Arch
- Ras Lanuf, Sirte District in Libya
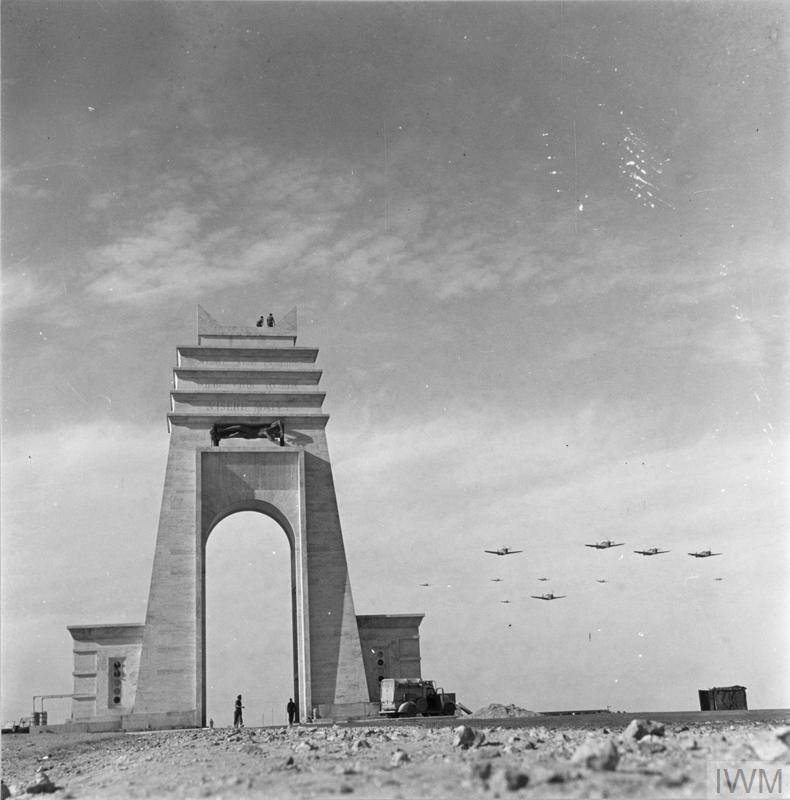
- Curtiss Kittyhawks of No. 239 Wing RAF fly into Marble Arch landing ground, past the Arco dei Fileni.

Site information
- Owner: Air Ministry
- Operator: Royal Air Force

Location
- Shown within Libya
- Coordinates: 30°27′24″N 18°34′41″E

Site history
- Built: 1941
- In use: 1941 - 1946

Royal Air Force Marble Arch or more commonly RAF Marble Arch, also known as Arco Philanorum Airfield and Ras Lanuf Airfield, is a former Royal Air Force station located in Ras Lanuf in the Mediterranean coast 227 kilometres (141 mi) south-southwest of Benghazi, Libya.

== History ==
In early 1941, Arco Philanorum Airfield primarily operated as an advance landing ground, also referred to as Marble Arch Airfield due to the location of the nearby Arch of the Philaeni. In March 1941, the airfield was used as for forward reconnaissance operations by the Luftwaffe, and a temporary station command was stationed. On 17 March 1941, 10,000 liters of German N4 fuel were ordered and was trucked to the airfield for use by tactical reconnaissance aircraft from 2.(H)/Aufkl.Gr. 14. From December 1941 until January 1942, Arco Philanorum Airfield was used heavily used by Regia Aeronautica and the Luftwaffe during Operation Crusader, functioning as an air-superiority and bomber-escort base. Afterwards, the airfield began operating as a command base for Fliegerführer Afrika, and also as a forward ground-attack base, launching dive-bomber operations against Allied formations due to its coastal location. Arco Philanorum Airfield was equipped with a firm and leveled, sand-surfaced landing ground measuring 1372 meters long and 1190 meters wide. There was no permanent infrastructure, however stocks of fuel were usually on hand. On 28 January 1942, Arco Philanorum Airfield was equipped with lights for night landings by aircraft operating from Greece and Crete and was also defended by three light Flak positions. On 31 May 1942, an airfield detachment was withdrawn and the airfield ceased use as an intermediate landing ground with emergency use only.

On 1 October 1942, Arco Philanorum Airfield was reactivated and serviceable during the Axis retreat after El Alamein. On 15 November 1942, a large-scale airlift of fuel began from Brindisi and Lecce in southern Italy to Arco, utilizing Junkers Ju 52, Heinkel He 111, Focke-Wulf Fw 200 Condor, and Savoia-Marchetti SM.82 aircraft. During this time, Arco Philanorum played a role of rear-guard fighter defence and evacuation support for the airlift. On 8 December 1942, one Bf 109 G-2 from 2./JG 77 was blown up to prevent capture, and the airfield was abandoned by the Germans. On 17 December 1942, the 2nd New Zealand Division captured Arco Philanorum Airfield.

=== RAF station ===
Following capture, the Royal Air Force (RAF) began using Arco Philanorum Airfield, and RAF Marble Arch was established. On 19 December 1942, the Advance Party of the No. 211 Group arrived to prepare the airfield for RAF usage. As the RAF wanted to develop a link from the United Kingdom to India via the Middle East, a chain of airfields was developed with Marble Arch among them. On 21 December 1942, the No. 40 Air Stores Park arrived, which handled logistical supplies for the airfield including ammunition and equipment. On 22 December 1942, a communication unit for the Rear HQ arrived, which handled signals and reporting. On 23 December 1942, the main party of the No. 211 Group RAF and the headquarters of the No. 285 Wing RAF arrived. RAF Marble Arch was likely serviceable by 18 December 1942, and operational units began arriving. Two concrete runways were laid, and technical facilities and permanent accommodation for transit personnel were constructed. As the airfield was hastily constructed, one Curtiss P-40 Kittyhawk of No. 450 Squadron RAAF was blown up and personnel were either wounded or killed from mines left behind by retreating Axis forces.

On 1 August 1945, the Marble Arch Station Headquarters (SHQ) was established from No. 16 Staging Post. On 31 October 1945, the SHQ was disbanded and was reformed as RAF Unit, Marble Arch, and administrative functions of the station was transferred to C & M, AHQ Eastern Mediterranean. In April 1946, RAF Marble Arch was abandoned.

== Units ==
The following lists the units that were based at Arco Philanorum Airfield:

Regia Aeronautica (Italian)

- 17° Gruppo CT, December 1941
- 3° Gruppo CT, December 1941
- 236ª Squadriglia CB, December 1941 – January 1942
- 6º Gruppo CT, January 1942
- 9° Gruppo CT, November – December 1942
- 10° Gruppo CT, November – December 1942

Luftwaffe (German)

- 2.(H)/Aufkl.Gr. 14, March 1941
- I./St.G. 1, December 1941
- Stab/St.G. 3, December 1941
- I./St.G. 3, December 1941
- Stab/JG 27, December 1941
- I./JG 27, December 1941 – January 1942
- II./JG 27, December 1941 – January 1942
- elements of 12./LG 1, January 1942
- elements of 1./Aufkl.Gr. 121, January 1942
- III./JG 27, January 1942
- 2.(H)/Aufkl.Gr. 14, January 1942
- II./JG 27, November 1942
- 4.(H)/Aufkl.Gr. 12, November 1942
- III./St.G. 3, November 1942
- elements of III./KG z.b.V. 1, November 1942
- Stab/JG 77, November – December 1942
- I./JG 77, November – December 1942
- III./JG 77, November – December 1942
- I./Schl.G. 2, November – December 1942

Station Commands (German)

- Behelfs-Kdtr. Araei Philaenorum, Mar 1941 – ?
- FI.H.Kdtr. E 6/IV, December 1941
- FI.H.Kdtr. E 25/IV, ? – November 1942
- FI.H.Kdtr. E 23/VII, November – December 1942

Station Units (German)

- Stab/Fliegerführer Afrika, January 1942
- Stab/Flak-Rgt. 102, Dec 1941 – January 1942
- elements of Res.Flak-Abt. 114, December 1941 – ?
- II./Flak-Rgt. 25, January 1942
- Stab/Fliegerführer Afrika, November – December 1942
- Ln.-Geräteausgabestelle 2/VII, November – December 1942
- elements of le. Flak-Abt. 841 (mot), December 1942
- elements of I./Flak-Rgt. 46, December 1942

Royal Air Force (British)

- elements of No. 117 Squadron RAF, 9 January 1943 – 6 March 1943, equipped with Hudson IV
- No. 250 Squadron RAF, 18 December 1942 – 31 December 1942, equipped with Kittyhawk III
- No. 260 Squadron RAF, 18 December 1942 – 31 December 1942, equipped with Kittyhawk IIA
- No. 267 Squadron RAF, 9 January 1943 – 19 January 1943, equipped with Douglas DC-3
- No. 318 Squadron RAF, 24 April 1944 – 25 April 1944, equipped with Spitfire VC
- No. 450 Squadron RAAF, 18 December 1942 – 1 January 1943, equipped with Kittyhawk III

Support Units (British)

- Advanced Party of No. 211 Group RAF, 19 December 1942 – 4 January 1943
- No. 40 Air Stores Park, 21 December 1942 – 1 January 1943
- Advance Base, Communications Unit, Rear HQ Western Desert, 22 December 1942 – 12 January 1943
- No. 16 Staging Post, 31 January 1943 – 1 August 1945
- No. 219 Group RAF, ? – April 1946
