= Daniel Laidlaw =

Scottish piper and Victoria Cross recipient (1875–1950)

Daniel Logan Laidlaw
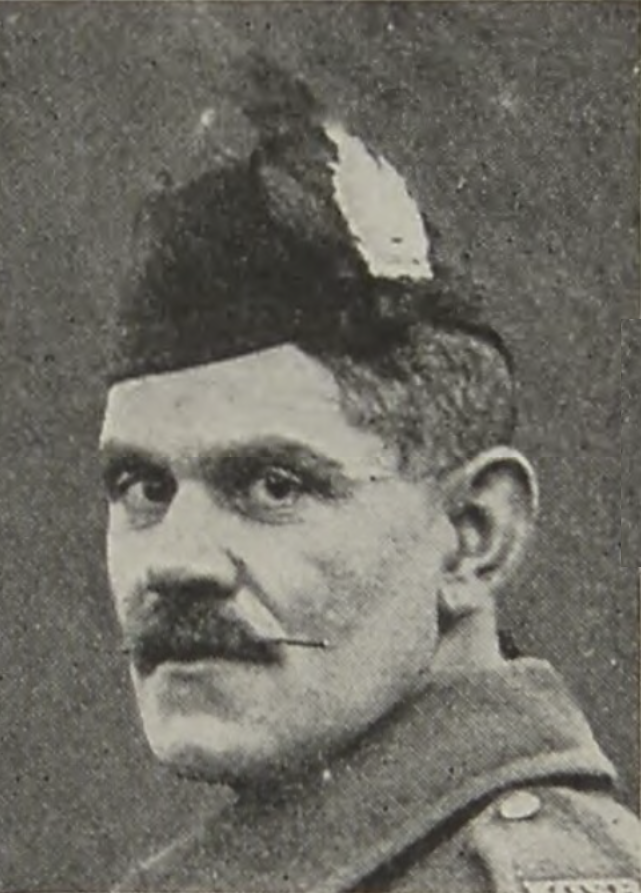
- Daniel Laidlaw (c. 1915)
- Born: 26 July 1875; Swinton, Scottish Borders
- Died: 2 June 1950 (aged 74); Norham, Northumberland
- Burial place: St Cuthbert's Churchyard, Norham
- Military career
- Allegiance: United Kingdom
- Branch: British Army
- Service years: 1896-1912; 1914-1919
- Rank: Sergeant-Piper
- Nickname: The Piper of Loos
- Unit: The King's Own Scottish Borderers
- Conflicts: World War I
- Awards: Victoria Cross

Daniel Logan Laidlaw VC (26 July 1875 – 2 June 1950), nicknamed "The Piper of Loos", was a Scottish soldier and recipient of the Victoria Cross (VC), the highest and most prestigious award for gallantry in the face of the enemy that can be awarded to British and Commonwealth forces, for his actions during the Battle of Loos in the First World War.

Only one other piper was awarded a VC during the First World War, the Scottish-born Canadian soldier James Cleland Richardson.

== Early life ==
Laidlaw was born at Little Swinton, Berwickshire on 26 July 1875 and joined the Army in 1896. He served with the Durham Light Infantry in India, where he received a certificate for his work during the Bombay plague epidemic of 1898. He then transferred as a piper to the King's Own Scottish Borderers, and in 1912 he transferred to the reserve.

== First World War ==
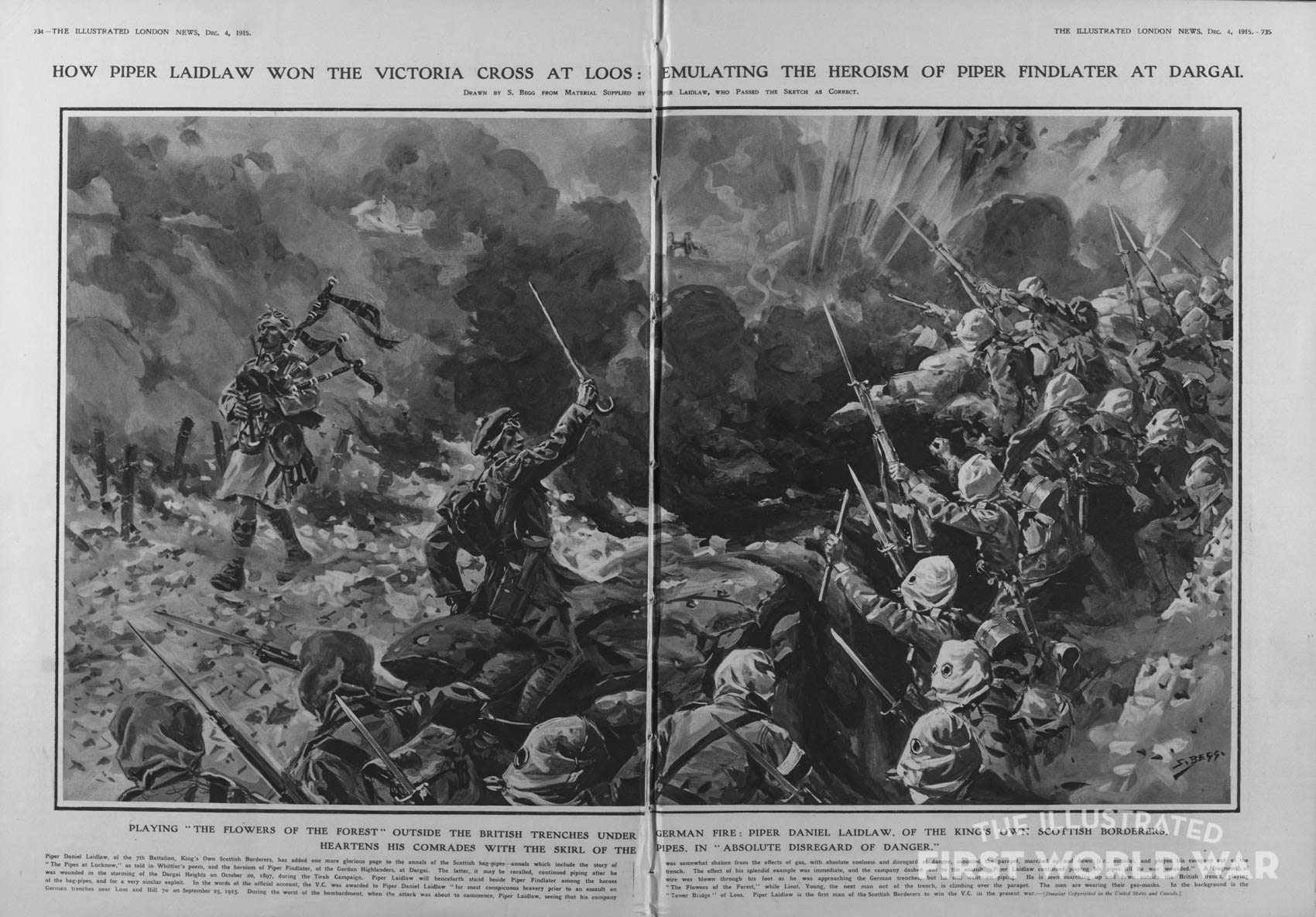
Samuel Begg illustration of how Piper Laidlaw won the Victoria Cross

Laidlaw re-enlisted on 7 September 1914 and was appointed acting Corporal before leaving to serve in France in February 1915.

Laidlaw was 40 years old, and a piper in the 7th Battalion, The King's Own Scottish Borderers, 15th (Scottish) Infantry Division, British Army during the Battle of Loos in September 1915 when the following deed took place for which he was awarded the VC.

Citation

London Gazette, 18 November, 1915. For most conspicuous bravery prior to an assault on German trenches near Loos and Hill 70 on 25th September 1915. During the worst of the bombardment, when the attack was about to commence, Piper Laidlaw, seeing that his company was somewhat shaken from the effects of gas, with absolute coolness and disregard of danger, mounted the parapet, marched up and down and played the company out of the trench. The effect of his splendid example was immediate, and the company dashed out to the assault. Piper Laidlaw continued playing his pipes till he was wounded.

He received the VC from King George V at Buckingham Palace in early 1916. This was followed by two promotions, to Corporal and then Lance Sergeant by the end of 1917. In the same year, the French awarded him the Croix de Guerre, which was commonly awarded to members of allied armed forces for heroic deeds. He was demobilised in April 1919 and transferred to the Class Z Reserve later that month.

== Post war ==
After the war, Laidlaw returned to live in north Northumberland. Despite his fame, he struggled to find regular work, and had long periods of unemployment. Just before the Second World War he became a sub-postmaster, and during the war served as a head ARP warden.

== Recognition ==
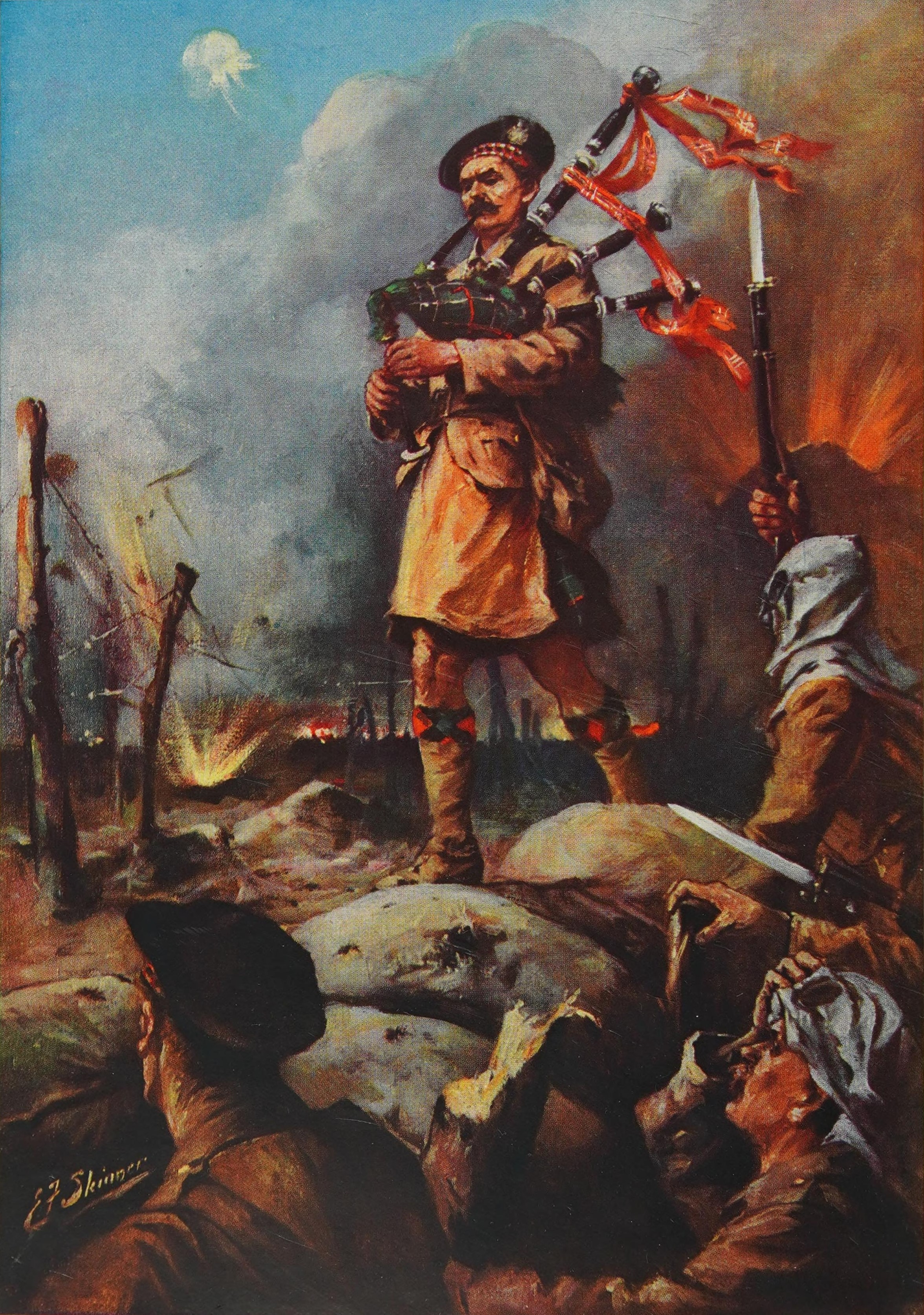
The Piper of Loos, a painting by E. F. Skinner on the frontispiece of The War Illustrated, Vol.IV, 1916.

Dubbed the "Piper of Loos" in the Scottish press, Laidlaw received more publicity than most contemporary VC recipients, both during and after the war. He played the pipes at various wartime concerts, while his portrait appeared in paintings, book illustrations and advertisements.

Post-war, he piped at a number of formal events, including the interment of the Unknown Warrior in 1920; at the head of several marches to the Cenotaph, notably in 1932 when he marched beside pipe-sergeant George Findlater VC; and at the London victory parade of June 1945. He appeared as himself in two films about the First World War, The Guns of Loos (1929) and Forgotten Men (1933). Among other public appearances, he piped for the Scottish Country Dancing Club in London, and accompanied a troupe of highland dancers on a tour of Norway in 1934.

The descendants of Laidlaw, donated his Victoria Cross and other medals to National Museum of Scotland on Chambers Street, Edinburgh, where they are on display.

== Personal life ==
In April 1906 Laidlaw married Georgina Mary Harvie at the Baptist Church, Alnwick, Northumberland. They had three sons and three daughters.

He died at Shoresdean, near Berwick-upon-Tweed, on 2 June 1950, and was buried in St Cuthbert's churchyard, Norham, Northumberland.

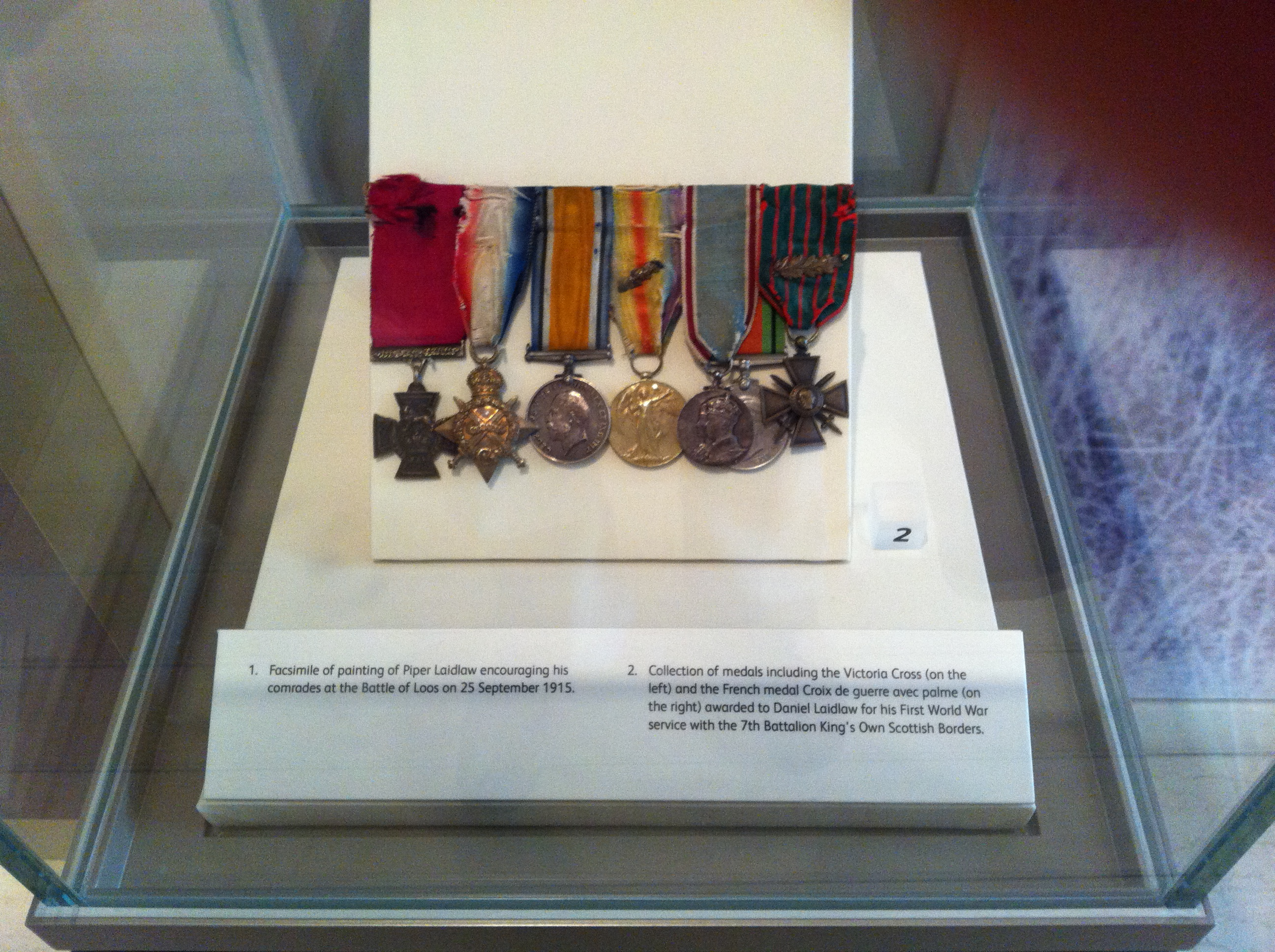
Laidlaw's medals

== Bibliography ==
- Ross, Graham (1995). Scotland's Forgotten Valour. MacLean Press. ISBN 978-1899272006.
- Batchelor, Peter; Matson, Christopher (2011). The Western Front 1915. VCs of the First World War. The History Press. ISBN 978-0-7524-6057-4.
