= RAF Gaza =

Royal Air Force airfield in Gaza

RAF Gaza
- Mandatory Palestine
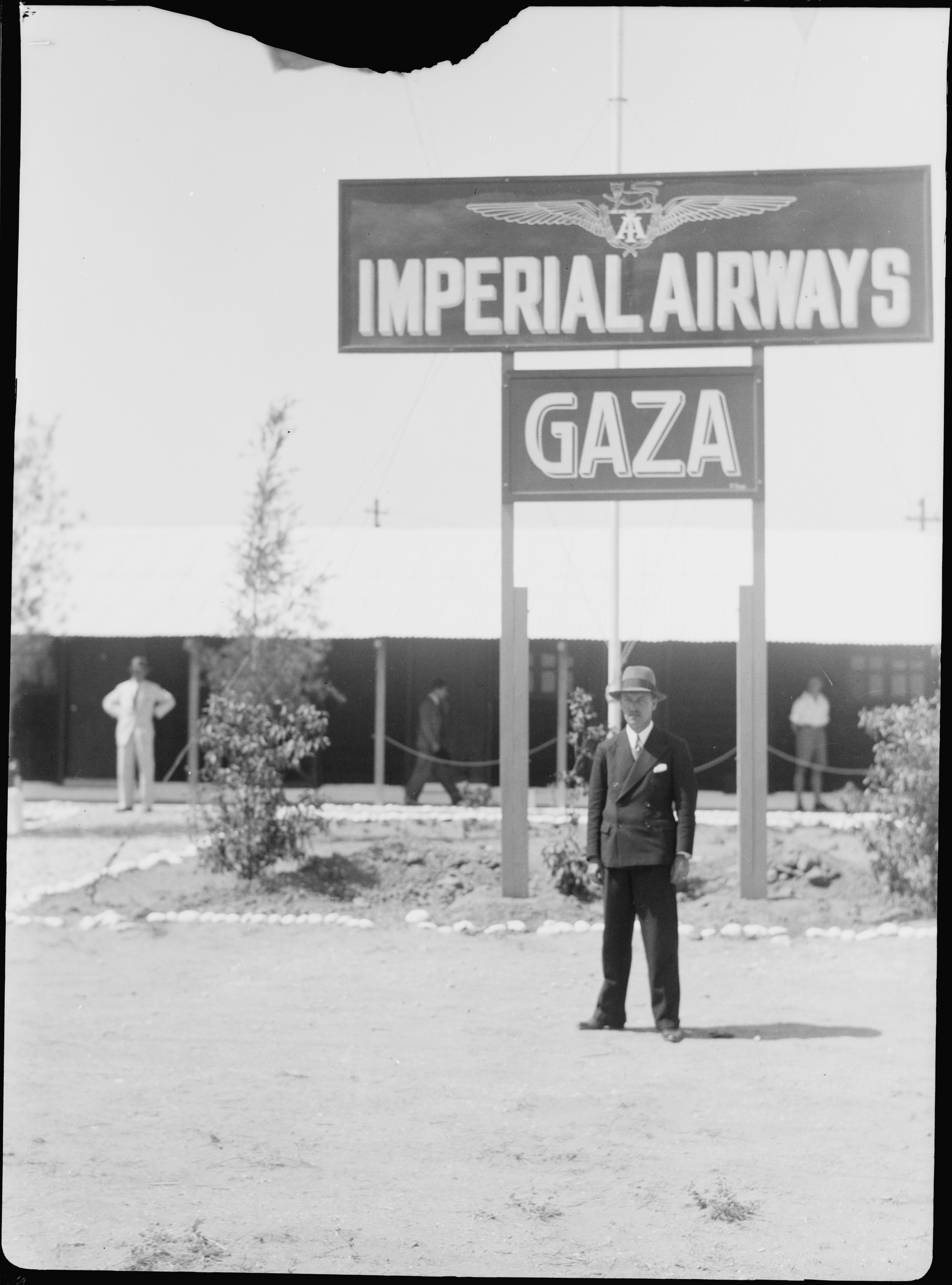
- Imperial Airways sign, Gaza, ca. 1935

Site information
- Type: Royal Air Force station
- Owner: Air Ministry
- Operator: Royal Air Force
- Condition: No remains except roadways

Location
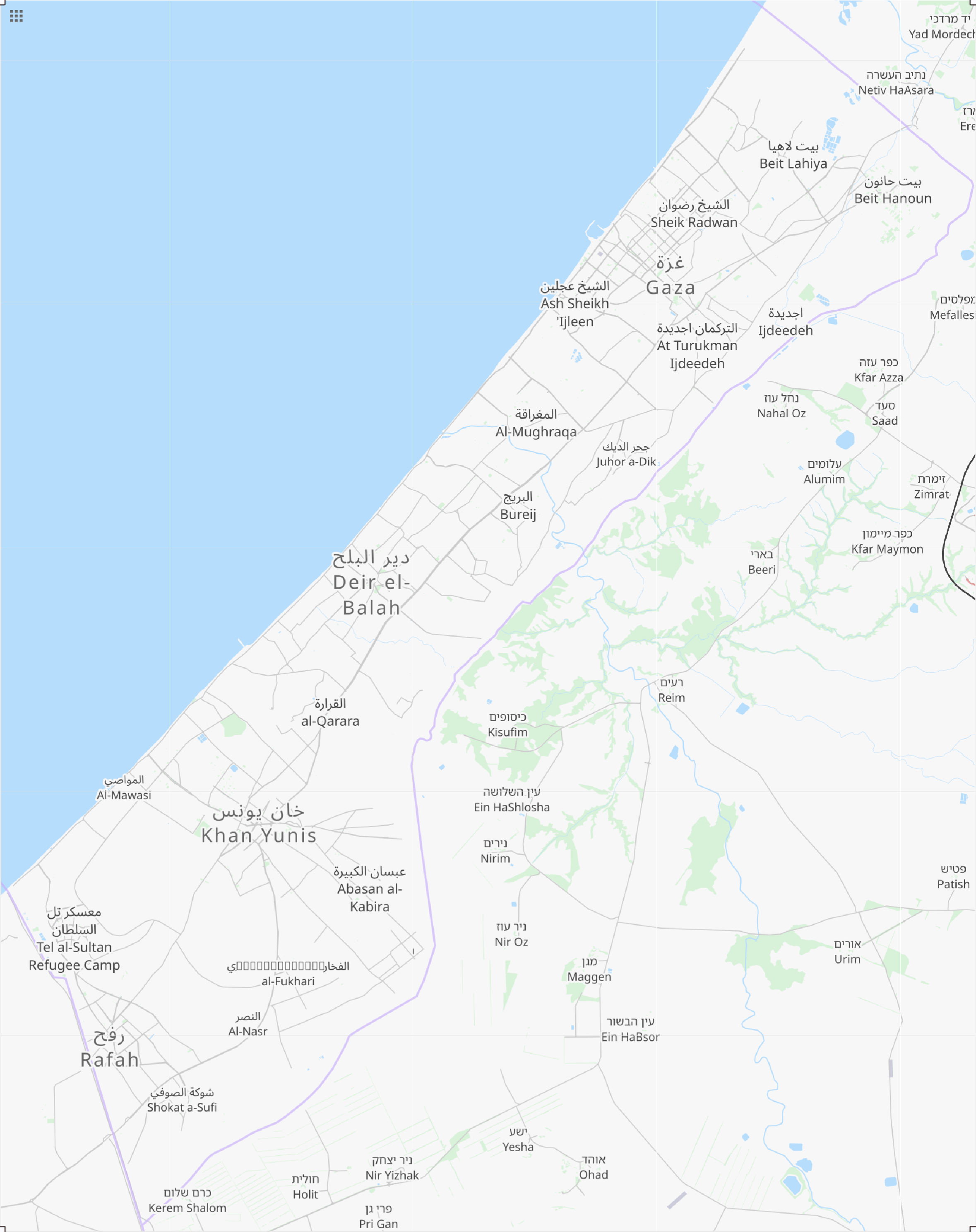
- Shown within Mandatory Palestine Shown within the modern Gaza Strip
- Coordinates: 31°30′03″N 34°27′22″E

Site history
- Built: 1917
- In use: 1917–1946
- Fate: Abandoned in 1946
- Battles/wars: Mediterranean and Middle East theatre of World War II

Royal Air Force Gaza or more simply RAF Gaza is a former Royal Air Force station in the southwest of Mandatory Palestine, where the current Gaza–Israel border is.

== History ==
Map of the aerodrome and landing ground from the 1931 Survey of Palestine map.

The airfield was one of the first to be built in British Mandatory Palestine. It was constructed in 1917 for military use by the Ottoman Empire, with German assistance.

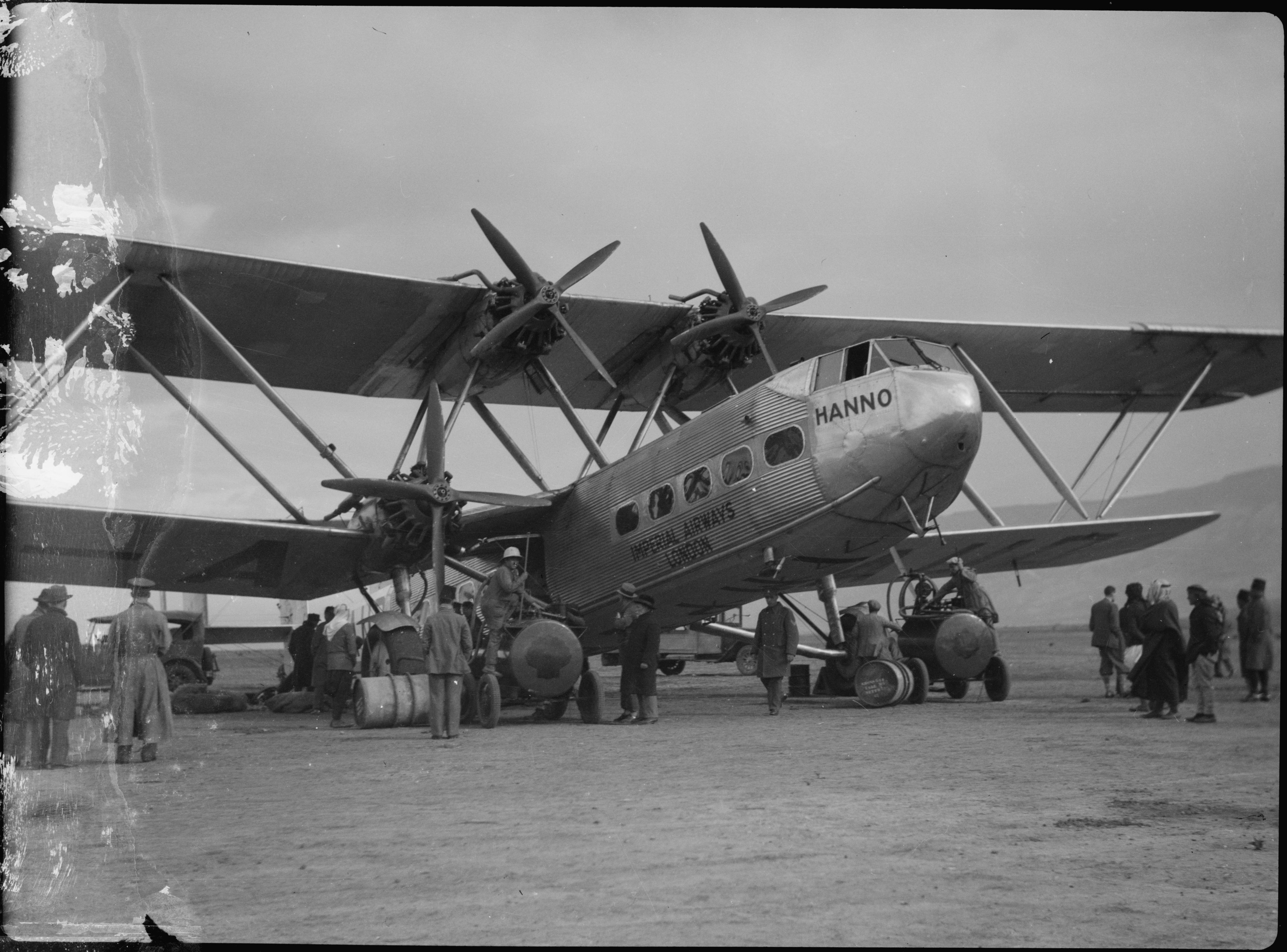
Imperial Airways Handley Page H.P.42 airliner G-AAUD Hanno at Gaza, ca. 1935

RAF Gaza was used for passenger services by Imperial Airways from 1927 as a stop en route to Baghdad and further to Karachi or Batavia, correspondingly.) and KLM (since 1933) In the 1930s, an illustrated London magazine proclaimed that passengers overnighting at Gaza, hailed as "the gateway to the Holy Land", were staying where Samson had once removed the city gates.

During the Second World War RAF Gaza was used by a number of RAF squadrons, including 33, 45, 127, 208, 318 and 451 Squadrons. No. 2 Air Crew Officers School RAF was based on the airfield, and the Greek Training Flight RAF was also based there in 1941–1942. The airfield was used as the Middle East ammunition depot from July to September 1942.

The site of RAF Gaza was later swallowed by the urban sprawl of the Zaytun Quarter of Gaza City; it was located about 700 m (770 yd) southwest of the Church of Saint Porphyrius. Although no remains of the airfield are visible today, the British concrete road linking the airfield with the ammunition storage areas (located about 6 km (3.7 mi) south of the airfield) is visible and in good shape.

== Incidents ==
- On February 14, 1930, an Imperial Airways de Havilland DH.66 Hercules (G-EBNA, City of Tehran) suffered a non-fatal landing mishap after the pilot misjudged the plane's altitude and struck a ridge 100 yards from the runway. The plane was damaged beyond repair. The incident took place during a passenger flight from Great Britain to India.

== See also ==
- Gaza Strip
- List of former Royal Air Force stations
