= Swinton, Scottish Borders =

Village in Scottish Borders, Scotland

Coordinates: 55.719737°N 2.264220°W

Swinton
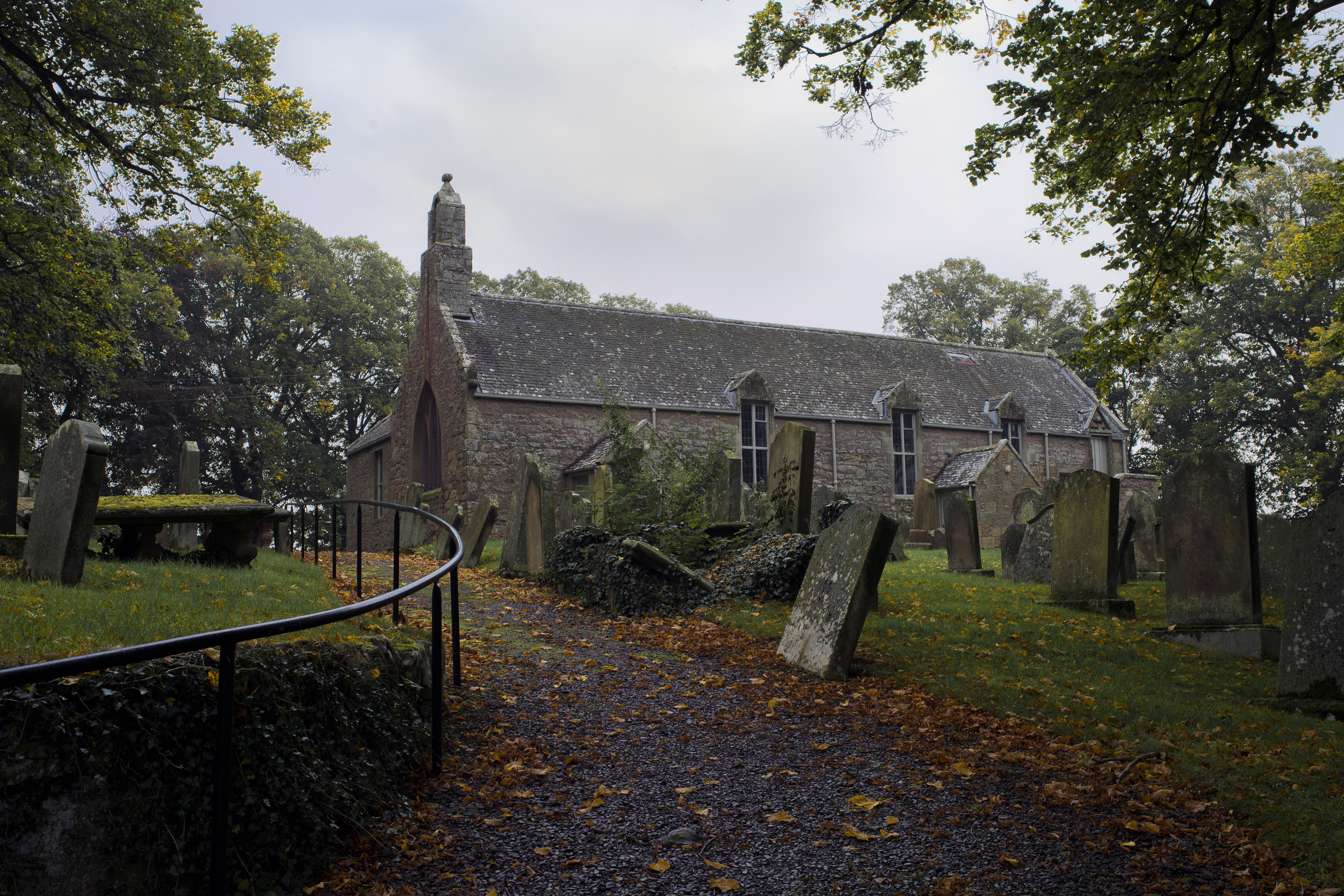
- A general view of Swinton Kirk

- Location within the Scottish Borders
- Population: circa 224
- OS grid reference: NT835474
- Council area: Scottish Borders
- Lieutenancy area: Berwickshire
- Country: Scotland
- Sovereign state: United Kingdom
- Post town: Duns
- Postcode district: TD11
- Dialling code: 01890
- Police: Scotland
- Fire: Scottish
- Ambulance: Scottish
- UK Parliament: Berwickshire, Roxburgh and Selkirk
- Scottish Parliament: Ettrick, Roxburgh and Berwickshire

Swinton is a small village in the Scottish Borders. It is in the former county of Berwickshire, around 5 miles (8 kilometres) southeast of Duns, and 3 miles (5 kilometres) northwest of the Anglo-Scottish border.

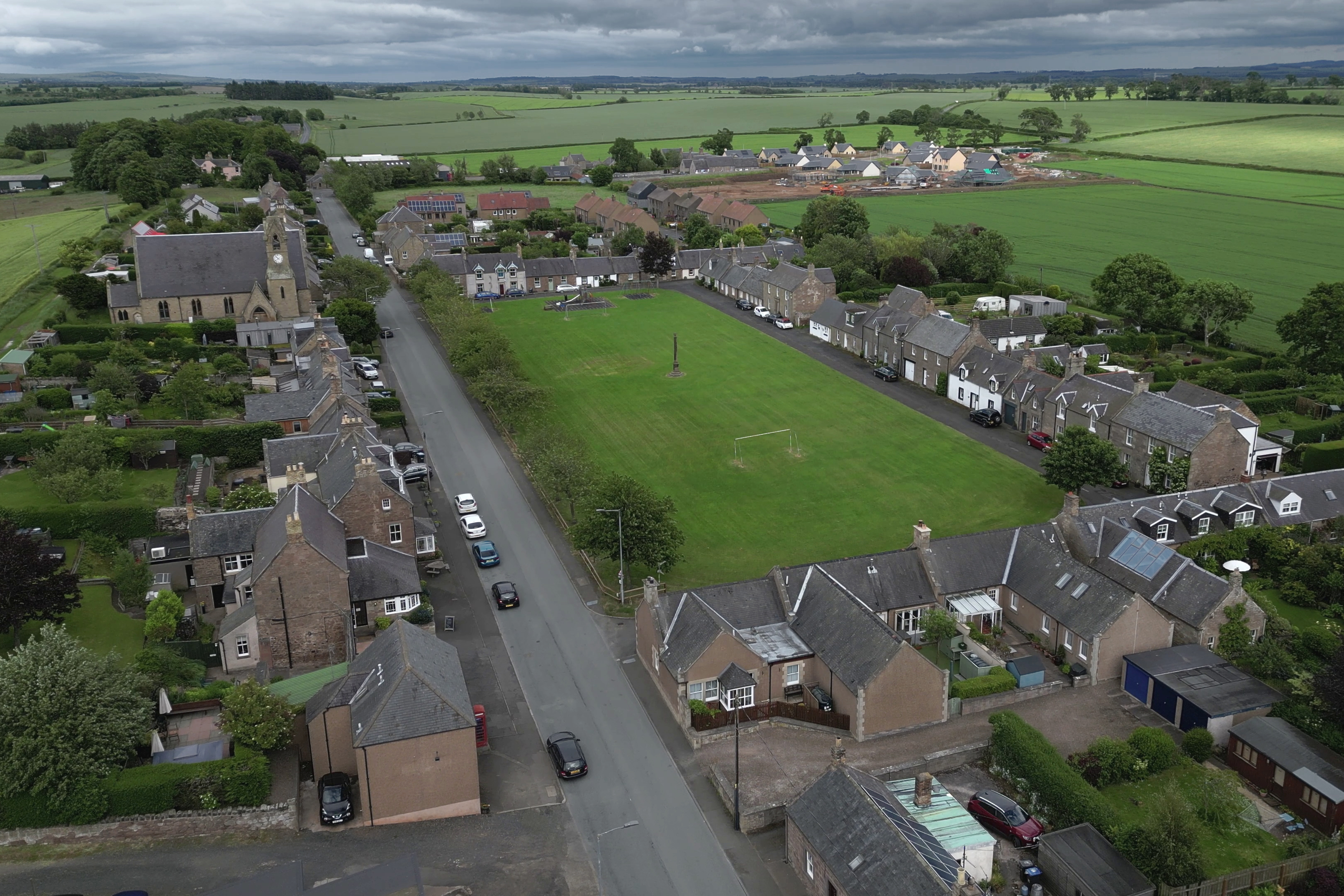
An aerial view of Swinton

== History ==
Swinton dates to the 11th century or earlier, and is associated with the Swinton family, who took their name from the settlement. In 1769, the village was re-designed and a market was created, now marked by the market cross. A parish church was built and still stands today. In the churchyard, the Swintons have their own burial enclosure. In 1843, the Free Church of Swinton was built, but in the 1900s the spire was removed and it became the local village hall.

The main parish church was remodelled in 1910 by Robert Lorimer. The vestry was remodelled again in 2020-2021, the building work and utilities were monitored by Border Reivers Archaeology Unit.

=== Notable people ===
- Daniel Laidlaw, recipient of the Victoria Cross

== Etymology ==
The name of the village is a contraction of Swine Town, a name borne from the large number of wild boar the land was once inhabited by.

== Swinton House ==
Swinton House, 1 mile (1.6 km) west of the village, dates in its current form to 1800, and was the residence of many of the Swinton family. It was built to replace an earlier house, which was destroyed by fire in the late 18th century. Both the house and the nearby 18th century dovecote are protected as category A listed buildings.
