= Comedy Playhouse (series 12) =

The twelfth series of Comedy Playhouse, the long-running BBC series, aired during 1972, with the last two episode being used as fillers due to the Munich massacre.

== Background ==
The twelfth series, which was in colour, consisted of seven episodes, each of which had a different cast and storyline. The pilot episode of Are You Being Served? was intended to be broadcast early in the year but the BBC chose not to broadcast it, and was not transmitted, until the Munich massacre at the 1972 Summer Olympics necessitated that it was used as a filler.

== Episodes ==
Title	Airdate	Duration	Overview	IMDb link
Idle at Work	14 January 1972	30 mins		
And Whose Side Are You On?	21 January 1972	30 mins		
Born Every Minute	28 January 1972	30 mins		
The Dirtiest Soldier in the World	27 March 1972	30 mins	An adaptation of one story in George MacDonald Fraser's The General Danced At Dawn.	
No Peace on the Western Front	30 August 1972	30 mins	Set in the First World War, starred Warren Mitchell as a German soldier.	
Weren't You Marcia Honeywell?	7 September 1972	30 mins		
Are You Being Served?	8 September 1972	30 mins	Not originally intended to be broadcast, the BBC screened it to fill a gap in the schedules due to the terrorist attack at the Munich Olympics. Became a very long-running programme.	
