= McAuslan in the Rough =

Second of three volumes of autobiographical short stories by George Macdonald Fraser

McAusland in the Rough
- First edition (UK)
- Author: George MacDonald Fraser
- Language: English
- Series: McAuslan
- Genre: Historical short stories
- Publisher: Barrie & Jenkins (UK); Knopf (US)
- Publication date: 1974
- Publication place: United Kingdom
- Pages: 209
- Followed by: The Sheikh and the Dustbin

McAuslan in the Rough is the second collection of short stories by George MacDonald Fraser featuring a young Scottish officer named Dand MacNeill. It is a sequel to The General Danced at Dawn and concerns life in a Highland regiment after the end of World War II.

It is slightly more comical in tone than that first collection. Some of the stories are set in North Africa; others in Scotland after the regiment's return to Scotland and the retirement of the old Colonel.

== Plot summaries ==
=== "Bo Geesty" ===
There has been some kind of military fortification at Fort Yarhuna since time immemorial. It stands at the junction of three trade routes across what once was grassland and now is desert. In turn, the fort has been garrisoned by Alexander's Greeks, Hannibal's Carthaginians, Scipio's Romans, Vandal patrols, proselytizing Arabs of the Caliphate period, Crusaders, Berbers, Mussolini's Italians, Rommel's Afrika Korps, and the 51st Highland Division. And now, on orders from GHQ, it is the first independent command of Lieutenant Dand MacNeill, who has two platoons under him.

On the way to the fort, they stop at the Arch of the Philaeni, nicknamed the Marble Arch.

MacNeill has orders to maintain order in Yarhuna Village (which largely consists of leaving things be), and to attempt to find water in the Fort and drill a well there. He and his men comply, but when they commence their exploratory drilling, strange things start to happen. Are the Jocks just going sand-happy, or is Fort Yarhuna haunted?

=== "Johnnie Cope in the Morning" ===
In MacNeill's battalion, the custom is for the full battalion pipe band to blow reveille for the unit every Friday, carefully sneaking into position and opening with "Johnnie Cope" at full bore while standing outside the subalterns' quarters. MacNeill, exhibiting great panache in the face of this aural assault, makes friends with the pipe-sergeant, no small thing for a newly commissioned officer, and later brings the pipey a problem. A new man has been assigned to his platoon, and as is the rule in the battalion, speciality units have first call on a new man who possesses their special skills, such as an amateur radio operator going to Signals, or a qualified mechanic to the motor transport platoon. Crombie, the new man, is a qualified bagpiper and wants to join the battalion pipe band, but it is 1946, and he is as black as the ace of spades.

=== "General Knowledge, Private Information" ===
When a unit is in garrison and is paid but once a month, the troops cannot go to town every night. Thus, in-house entertainments are more important for boosting troop morale than they might otherwise be. To keep the troops happy and give them something to root for, the Colonel and the colonel of the Fusiliers sharing the post with the Highlanders work out the rules and scoring system for a general knowledge quiz competition on the order of the GE College Bowl or Information, Please. Each battalion will select a team to do battle for the honor of their battalion and a large box of Turkish delight. MacNeill is one of the battalion's contestants, the resident expert on general knowledge. The Padre handles religion, arts, music and literature; Sergeant McGaw, a former Communist organizer, politics; and Private Forbes, of Dand's platoon, questions on sports. The competition is fast, furious, and hard-fought, but ends in a tie. As a tie-breaker, the following question is put up for anyone, including members of the audience: "In a game of association football, how is it possible for a player to score three successive goals without any other player touching the ball in between?" And Private McAuslan, heaven help us all, has the answer.

=== "Parfit Gentil Knight, But" ===
The battalion surgeon's daughter, Ellen Ramsey, has come out to the desert to join her father for a visit. Drop dead gorgeous and with a winning personality, she promptly becomes the object of a battle for her affections between two of Dand's fellow officers: Lieutenant MacKenzie, a tall, redheaded charmer of women; and Lieutenant Grant, who not only has a privately owned vehicle, but a Hudson Terraplane at that. But there is a third competitor in the lists: Private McAuslan.

=== "Fly Men" ===
The battalion is facing a serious crisis. One of the soldiers reports to the hospital and is diagnosed with smallpox. It being a weekend night, most of the Jocks are out on passes for a good time in the North African town, scattered from hell to breakfast. The Colonel orders that all of the men be corralled and brought back to the garrison to be re-vaccinated. A detachment under Dand MacNeill is sent into the town to oversee the gathering-up of the troops. After a few hours, all are accounted for except two—but one of the two not only was in direct contact with the Index Case now in hospital, but is suspected of planning to desert along with his buddy. The Colonel knows of a hotel in the Suk, the bazaar in the native quarter, where it is said a deserter looking to make a "home run" back to England may be able to arrange a passage, and he sends Dand into the off-limits Suk to bring them back, lest an epidemic of smallpox break out and sweep the town like a tidal wave.

=== "McAuslan in the Rough" ===
The regiment is back home in Scotland and stationed on the east coast. The local golf course extends courtesy memberships to the battalion's golfers. Following a match in which one of the battalion's majors plays a tight match with a professional golfer serving with the battalion, their new colonel, eager to enhance the prestige of the outfit, challenges the colonel of the Royal Scots stationed nearby to put up his best against the best golfers of the battalion. The colonel, however, is unaware that the standard of golf in his battalion is not as high as the match he watched led him to believe. Dand MacNeill, as Battalion Sports Officer and a decent golfer himself, puts together the battalion's half of the foursomes for the match: the Adjutant, a golfing neurotic, and the golf pro who is the officers' barman; two elderly majors who have been feuding with each other for twenty years; the Medical Officer, whose best club is his brandy flask, and the Padre, who plays in a state of reverie; Subaltern MacMillan, who has the annoying habit of giggling, especially after a bad shot, and Regimental Quartermaster Bogle, who might be a decent golfer could he but see the ball past his beer belly; and Regimental Sergeant Major Mackintosh, a steady golfer, partnered with Dand himself. Soldiers from MacNeill's platoon are recruited to serve as caddies ... and one of them, assigned to the RSM, is Private McAuslan, who is illiterate and doesn't know a brassie from a cleek. It will indeed be an interesting match.

=== "His Majesty Says Good-Day" ===
After years of service in the Army, both in the ranks and as an officer, Lieutenant Dand MacNeill's demobilization number has finally come up. Having considered but decided against taking a regular commission, his final duty to His Majesty King George VI is to see a draft of men through the discharge process. This involves making sure their shots are up to date; that they are not making off with any British Army property; that they have their travel warrants and paybooks; receive their final pay and their ration cards; and are ready to be processed through the kitting-out center, outfitted with civilian clothes (the gift of the British government), and released to civilian life. Unfortunately for Dand, one of the men being discharged with him is 14687347 Private McAuslan, J., the British Army's answer to Gollum.
