= Light Brigade =

== Military forces ==
- Light Brigade (Belgium), part of the Belgian military
- Light Brigade, a brigade within the Light Division of England
- 19th Light Brigade of the British Army
- Light brigade, a light cavalry brigade
- Light brigade, a light infantry brigade
- The Light Brigade, a Napoleonic era British infantry formation consisting of the 43rd (Monmouthshire) Regiment of Foot, the 52nd (Oxfordshire) Regiment of Foot, and the 95th Rifles
- The cavalry formation that executed the Charge of the Light Brigade during the Crimean War in 1854
- 1st Light Brigade, part of the Wehrmacht that later became the 6th Panzer Division
- 13th Light Brigade of the Royal Netherlands Army
- 3rd Light Armoured Brigade of the French Army
- 6th Light Armoured Brigade of the French Army
- 9th Light Armoured Marine Brigade, name of the French Army 9th Marine Infantry Brigade from 1999 to 2013

== Other uses ==
- The Light Brigade (disambiguation)
- Charge of the Light Brigade (disambiguation)
- Light Brigade, a clipper ship built in Medford, Massachusetts in 1854 that was originally named Ocean Telegraph
