= William Lummis =

British military historian (1886–1985)

The Reverend Canon William Murrell Lummis MC
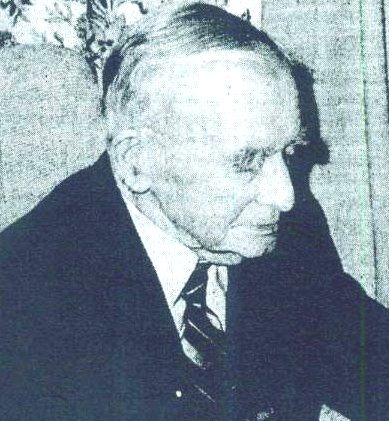
- Canon W. M. Lummis
- Born: 4 June 1886; Coddenham, Suffolk
- Died: 2 November 1985 (aged 99 years)
- Other name: Canon William Murrell Lummis
- Occupations: Soldier, Church of England clergyman
- Known for: Military history

William Murrell Lummis MC (4 June 1886 – 2 November 1985) was a British military historian most noted for the research he conducted on the Victoria Cross, the Charge of the Light Brigade, and Rorke's Drift.

== Military career ==
William Lummis c. 1904

Born in Coddenham, Suffolk, Lummis was the oldest of seven children born to George Murrell Lummis (1860–1912) and Louisa Sparrow (1854–1933). After leaving school at the age of 14, Lummis worked as a clerk in a Magistrates' Clerk's Office in his hometown of Coddenham before enlisting, aged 18, in the 11th Hussars as a trooper in 1904. By 1911 he was a Lance Sergeant and became responsible, amongst other duties, for the editing of the 11th Hussars' regimental journal. At that time he met the survivors of the Charge of the Light Brigade who had gathered for a reunion. In 1912 he endeavoured to create a complete and accurate roll of the men who had served in the 11th Hussars in the Crimean War.

By the outbreak of the First World War in August 1914, he was Regimental Quartermaster Sergeant, the youngest in the British Army. He served on the Western Front throughout the War, taking part in the Retreat from Mons and seeing action in Flanders. He was commissioned in 1916 and transferred to his county regiment, the Suffolk Regiment, serving with the regiment's second battalion for the remainder of the war. He was awarded the Military Cross (MC) for bravery on 21–23 August 1918 during the Second Battle of the Somme. He commanded the battalion on 23 October 1918 at its last First World War action, the Battle of the Selle, when it took all its objectives. The full citation for his MC appeared in The London Gazette in November 1918, by which time the war was over, and reads as follows:

For conspicuous gallantry and good leadership. Through thick fog he led his company, under complete control, to the objective. He personally rushed an enemy machine gun and killed the crew. Later he led his company forward with great determination, in face of very heavy fire. He set a splendid example of determined courage to those under him.

After the war ended, he remained in the army, serving in India, Britain and Ireland. He was appointed Adjutant and Quarter-Master in the Army School of Education in India, returning to England in 1925, rejoining his regiment on 14 October. He was promoted to captain on 21 January 1928, and on 9 December 1930 he reached the retirement age for service, remaining in the reserve of officers for a further five years. On leaving the Army he researched the other four Light Brigade regiments which had also taken part in the Charge of the Light Brigade.

== Ministry ==
Lummis was ordained deacon in the Church of England in 1930. Moving back to his home county of Suffolk, his first living was at St Matthew's Church, Ipswich, followed by other appointments in the county, including Rural Dean of South Elmham. In 1955, he became a Canon of the Diocese of St Edmundsbury and Ipswich. After retirement, he went to live in Barnham Broom in Norfolk, though he continued in the ministry, holding various part-time appointments in nearby parishes, and acting as Rural Dean of Higham.

Lummis ran Boy Scout troops from 1909, firstly at Shorncliffe and later at Aldershot, in India, and at Ipswich and Kesgrave until the late 1930s. In 1948 he was re-commissioned as a Chaplain to the Forces, 4th Class, with the Suffolk Army Cadet Force, and in 1950 became a lieutenant, also in the Suffolk ACF, and continued to serve until his retirement in 1954.

== Historian, writer, researcher ==
Although his main interest was military history, he also wrote two books on English parishes. He was also active in the Suffolk Institute of Archeology and the Suffolk Preservation Society. Throughout his life, he shared his work with others, encouraging them to continue work that he had started. In his 98th year, he appeared in a BBC television programme, Timewatch, recounting his memories of meeting survivors of the Charge of the Light Brigade. He was the first honorary president of the Crimean War Research Society and chaplain to the Victoria Cross and George Cross Association, whose membership is made up exclusively of recipients of those awards.

=== Victoria Cross archive ===
Lummis' interest in Victoria Cross recipients started when he was a schoolboy in the 1890s. He built up an archive of the service records and final resting places of Victoria Cross holders, summarising the results in a pamphlet. However, Lummis perceived short-comings in his work and encouraged David Harvey to continue and develop it, making his archives available to him. The result was Harvey's seminal book Monuments to Courage.

=== Charge of the Light Brigade archive ===
Lummis' first regiment, the 11th Hussars rode in the Charge of the Light Brigade during the Crimean War. Whilst editing the regimental journal, Lummis met and interviewed many surviving members of the Charge. (The last veteran of Balaklava died in 1927) Hearing about the 1875 reunion when over 2000 men claimed to have taken part, he set about preparing a roll of those who charged, soon fleshing the list out with biographies. Over his lifetime, this built into a major archive, acknowledged as a major source by Lawrence W. Crider for his book, In Search of the Light Brigade. Lummis was also the co-author, with Kenneth G. Wynn, of Honour the Light Brigade, which was published when he was 83 years old.

=== Rorke's Drift research ===
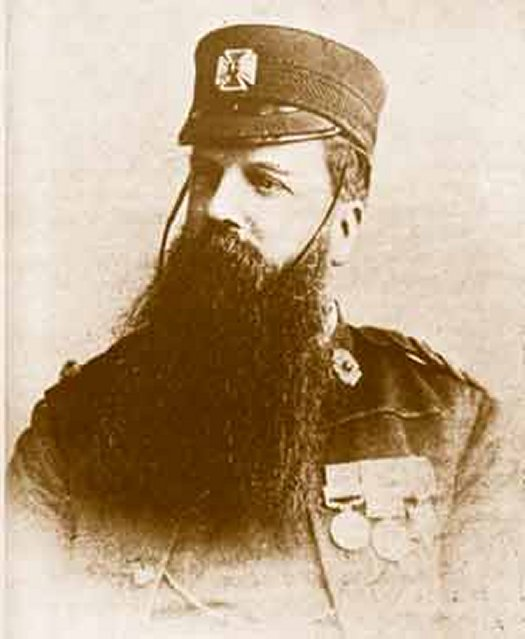
Padre George Smith of Rorke's Drift was the subject of a book by Lummis

It is unclear when his interest in the Zulu Wars developed but his 1978 book Padre George Smith of Rorke's Drift was a detailed analysis of the part played by Smith in the famous battle of Rorke's Drift during the Zulu War of 1879. The book showed that Smith's involvement in the defence of the mission station had been seriously overlooked in favour of the more famous participants, such as John Chard and Gonville Bromhead, who had won Victoria Crosses during the action. Padre Smith is depicted in the centre of Alphonse de Neuville's famous 1880 painting 'The Defence of Rorke's Drift' distributing ammunition to the defenders.

== Legacy ==
His collection of artefacts (including many photographs) and his archives from his Victoria Cross and Light Brigade research were deposited with the Imperial War Museum and the National Army Museum. When the Royal Mail produced a series of stamps in 2006 commemorating the Victoria Cross, they featured photographs and artifacts from the Lummis archive at the National Army Museum. His tape-recorded memoirs, covering the period 1904–1919, are in the Imperial War Museum sound archives. His notes and papers on the histories of Norfolk parishes (1931–1967) went to the Norfolk Record Office. His Crimean War archives were shared with Dave Harvey, Ken Horton, Glenn Fisher, Andrew Sewell, Roy Mills, and Edward James Boys. Since Lummis' death in 1985, the Crimean War Research Society has awarded the Canon Lummis Trophy annually for original research into the Crimean War.

William Lummis married Agnes Emma Templeton (1897–1976) on 26 April 1919 at Aldershot in Hampshire and was the father of Lieutenant-Colonel Eric Templeton Lummis (1920–1999) of the Suffolk Regiment and a World War II military historian.

He died on 2 November 1985 at the Manormead Nursing Home in Hindhead in Surrey.

== Selected works ==
- Honour the Light Brigade (with Kenneth G. Wynn), J. B. Hayward and Son, 1973, ISBN 0-903754-03-7
- Padre George Smith of Rorke's Drift , Wensum Books (Norwich) Ltd, 1978, ISBN 0-903619-21-0
- First Lieutenant Edward St John Daniel. The Tragic Story of the Only Officer to Forfeit the VC; Journal of the Orders and Medals Research Society, December 1969, pp 100–102.
- The Churches of Bungay (with Ethel Mann), British Publishing Company, 1950
- Kesgrave. A short guide to church and parish, W. E. Calver, 1937
