= Maud, and Other Poems =

1855 poetry collection by Tennyson

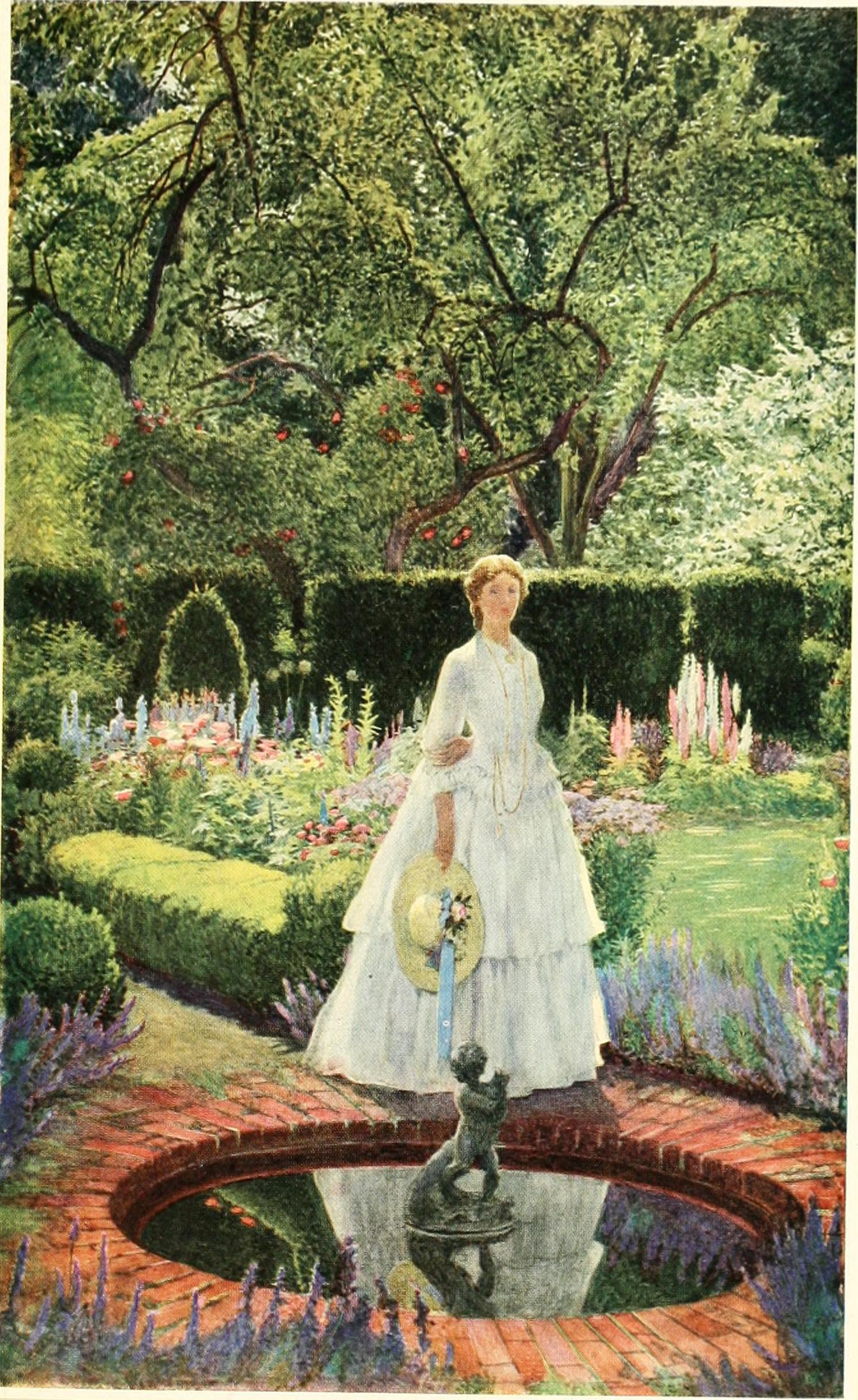
Maud is only seventeen by Eleanor Fortescue-Brickdale

Maud, and Other Poems (1855) was Alfred Tennyson's first published collection after becoming poet laureate in 1850.

Among the "other poems" was "The Charge of the Light Brigade", which had already been published in The Examiner a few months earlier.

== Contents ==
- Maud
- The Brook; An Idyl
- The Letters
- Ode on the Death of the Duke of Wellington
- The Daisy
- To the Rev. F. D. Maurice
- Will
- The Charge of the Light Brigade

== "Maud" ==
The poem has been described as "terribly strange, weird, disturbing, powerful". It was inspired by Charlotte Rosa Baring, younger daughter of William Baring (1779–1820) and Frances Poulett-Thomson (d. 1877). Frances Baring married, secondly, Arthur Eden (1793–1874), Assistant-Comptroller of the Exchequer, and they lived at Harrington Hall, Spilsby, Lincolnshire, which is the garden of the poem (also referred to as "the Eden where she dwelt" in Tennyson's poem "The Gardener's Daughter").

Tennyson referred to the poem as "my little Hamlet."

=== Narrative ===
The first part of the poem dwells on the funeral of the protagonist's father, and a feeling of loss and lament prevails; then Maud is the prevailing theme. At first the narrator is somewhat antagonistic towards Maud and is unsure whether she is teasing him; he feels Maud is unfit to be a wife. Later the narrator falls passionately in love with Maud and this transforms the narrative into a pastoral, dwelling on her beauty.

The appearance of Maud's brother causes conflict. Maud's brother favours a mine-owner who is seen as an upstart as his family have been rich for only three generations, and forbids Maud to contact the narrator. The brother goes to London for a week, giving the narrator a chance to court Maud, but on his return he arranges a ball, invites the mine-owner and leaves the narrator out. During the ball the poet waits for Maud in the garden, leading to the famous line "Come into the garden, Maud". Early in the morning Maud comes out. Shortly afterwards Maud's brother also appears and strikes the narrator, who kills him in an unnarrated duel.

The narrator is forced to flee to France where he learns later that Maud has also died. Maud's death impacts on the psychological state of the protagonist, and an emotional longing for contact with the deceased echoes the tones of In Memoriam. The distressed narrator loses his sanity for a while and imagines that he himself is dead.

The poem ends in Part III, with the narrator, ostensibly restored to sanity, leaving to fight in the Crimean War; parallels may be drawn between the death of Maud's brother, and the apparently justified killing of soldiers in war.

=== Interpretation ===
The interpretation of "Maud" is complicated by the compromised position and the emotional instability of the narrator. This is expressed through a variety of poetic meters and forms as well as a proto-cinematic cycling of imagery. The puzzle of the outside sphere of "Maud", for example, the point of view of Maud herself, remains unresolved. The poem is a distorted view of a single reality, and the variation in meter can be seen to reflect the manic-depressive emotional tone of the speaker. While the poem was Tennyson's own favourite (he was known very willingly to have recited the poem in its entirety on social occasions), it was met with much criticism in contemporary circles.

In "Maud", Tennyson returns to the poetry of sensation, and dwells on a consciousness constituted of fragments of feeling. He deliberately denies an autonomous voice, and the ending is deeply ironic. The complex of feeling is ephemeral, and the culmination of these feelings ends in the unsatisfactory conclusion of the Crimean War. Tennyson is expressing the feelings of an age where identity, intellect and modernity were contentious issues. He does not offer a clear, linear answer. The chivalric style of the love-poem is combined with a contemporary cynicism, and so the Victorian tendency to look to remote cultures (here, medievalism) is insufficient. The interweaving of death and life images gives expression to the greater concern for the afterlife, and the movement of the human race into a different age from past monuments.

== Critical reception ==
For the most part, critics' reviews of Maud, and Other Poems were sharply negative. Many disliked that it was narrated by a mentally ill character. However, some psychologists were impressed with the accuracy of Tennyson's depiction of hallucinations.

== See also ==
- Michael William Balfe, who set "Come into the garden, Maud" to music
- Marie Lloyd, who sang "Come into the garden, Maud"

== Bibliography ==
- Balfe, Michael William. Come into the Garden, Maud: A Cavatina. London: Boosey & Sons, 1857.
- Bennett, James R. "The Historical Abuse of Literature: Tennyson's 'Maud: A Monodrama' and the Crimean War". English Studies 62 (1981): 34–45
- Bennett, James R. "Maud, Part II: Maud's Battle-Song". Victorian Poetry 18 (1980): 35–49.
- Bristow, Joseph. “Nation, Class, and Gender: Tennyson’s ‘Maud’ and War". Genders 9 (1990): 93–111.
- Dransfield, Scott. “The Morbid Meters of Maud". Victorian Poetry 46.3 (2008). 279–297.
- Inglesfield, Robert. "Tennyson's 'Come into the Garden, Maud' and the Song of Solomon". Victorian Poetry 37.1 (1999): 121–123.
- Jalili, Duraid. "Lamenting Maud's Worth Becoming Maud" Crrritic!. Ed. John Schad and Oliver Tearle. Brighton: Sussex Academic Press, 2011. 232–250.
- Markovits, Stefanie. "Giving Voice to the Crimean War: Tennyson's 'Charge' and Maud's Battle-song". Victorian Poetry 47.3 (2009): 481–504.
- Rader, Ralph W. Tennyson's Maud: The Biographical Genesis. Berkeley: University of California Press, 1963.
- Shepherd, Richard Herne. "The Genesis of Tennyson’s 'Maud'". The North American Review 139.335 (Oct 1884). 356–361.
- Shires, Linda M. "Maud, Masculinity and Poetic Identity". Criticism XXIX.3 (Summer 1987). 269–290.
- Smith, Goldwin. "The War Passages in Maud". Saturday Review 1 (Nov 1855). 14–15. Reprinted in Tennyson, The Critical Heritage. Ed. John Jump. London: Routledge, 1967. 186-90.
- Somervell, Arthur. Cycle of Songs from Tennyson's Maud. London: Boosey & Co, 1898.
- Tucker, Herbert F. "Maud and the Doom of Culture". Critical Essays on Alfred Lord Tennyson. Ed. Herbert F. Tucker. New York: G. K. Hall, 1993. 174–194
- Vanden Bossche, Chris R. "Realism versus Romance: The War of Cultural Codes in Tennyons' "Maud'". Victorian Poetry 24 (1986): 69–82.
