= The Light Brigade =

The Light Brigade may refer to:

- The Light Brigade (DC Comics), a DC Comics series written by Peter Tomasi
- "The Light Brigade" (Trident Comics), a story by Neil Gaiman and Nigel Kitching, published in the 1989–1990 anthology Trident
- "The Light Brigade" (The Outer Limits), a 1996 TV episode
- The Light Brigade (album), a 2014 album by Daedelus
- The Light Brigade, easy listening band conducted by Enoch Light in the 1940s-1960s
- The Light Brigade, a novel by Kameron Hurley.

== See also ==
- Charge of the Light Brigade (disambiguation)
- Light Cavalry (disambiguation)
