= Crimean War Research Society =

International society

Crest and motto of the Crimean War Research Society

The Crimean War Research Society (CWRS) is an international society of professional and amateur historians who research the Crimean War of 1854–56. The Society aims to bring previously unpublished or under-researched material concerning the Crimean War to the attention of a wider audience, together with making it available to present and future historians. It publishes a quarterly journal, The War Correspondent.

== History ==
Founded in London in 1983, the Society's original members were largely also members of the Victorian Military Society (VMS), who, dissatisfied with the coverage given to the Crimean War by the VMS and its journal, decided to break away and set up a society exclusively dedicated to research into the Crimean War. The founding committee included Glenn Christodoulou (Chairman 1983-1995), David Cliff (Secretary 1983– ) and Frank Hippman (Publications). Cliff was the first editor of the Society's journal, The War Correspondent, a position taken over by Rod Robinson from 1984 to 1994, later by Major Colin Robins OBE (1994-2005), by author Lawrence W. Crider (2005–2011), then by publisher Matthew J. Pizzo (2011–2014), and from 2014 to the present by Lawrence W. Crider again.

A seven-month-long hiatus in 2014 in the publication of the society's journal, The War Correspondent, ended in December 2014 with the publication of Volume 32, Number 1. During that time the CWRS underwent organisational changes, including the voluntary ending of its charitable status, which it had acquired a couple of years previously.

== Aims ==
The Society describes it aims as:

"to honour and remember those that fell in the war and to study the war in its entirety - from mainstream topics like the deaths from disease in the Crimea and the naval confrontation in the Baltic to little-known aspects of the war such as the British Army's refusal to deploy poison gas at Sevastopol, and the naval actions in the Pacific.

Scaling the Heights of the Alma; The Charge of the Light Brigade; the Soldier's Battle; Florence Nightingale; the Fall of Sevastopol; the incompetence of those in command; the endurance of the ordinary soldier; the Great Storm; the political wrangles in Constantinople, Vienna, Paris and London; the newspaper reporting and the new-fangled telegraph; the uniforms and the arms; the soldiers, sailors, camp-followers, spectators, businessmen and politicians; the effect on the military, industry and the man in the street; all of these and more are examined by the Crimean War Research Society."

The Society's journal, The War Correspondent, contains the results of recent research by the Society's members, many of whom are professional historians. Each year the Society awards the Canon Lummis Trophy for the most original article in its journal. The Society provides expert advice to academic and mass-media projects concerning the Crimean War; these have included Channel Four's 1997 documentary The Crimean War as well as books and journals.

The Society has a three-day annual conference when presentations and original research on the Crimean War are given. In addition, national and international research and study visits are undertaken; these have included trips to the Crimea to visit the original battlefields and memorials of the Crimean War.

The Society publishes a wide range of publications and documents of interest to those researching the War, including copies of contemporary maps and books, information sheets on the contents of regimental museums, bibliographies, medal rolls and other books and booklets written by the Society's members.

== Notable members ==
- Norman Rossington, actor
- George Paget, 7th Marquess of Anglesey
