= David Charles Harvey =

British military historian (1946–2004)

David Charles Harvey (29 July 1946 – 4 March 2004) was a British historian and author. He is notable for his seminal work, Monuments To Courage, which documents the graves of almost all recipients of the Victoria Cross, a task that took him over 36 years to complete.

== Early life and education ==
Harvey was born in East Ham, then in Essex but now part of the London Borough of Newham, the son of a grocer, and worked as a salesman after he attended Hinchley Wood School in Surrey. He later joined the Metropolitan Police, where he started the mounted police magazine One One Ten, before he moved to Denver, Colorado, to run an equestrian centre for over a decade.

== Career ==
A chance meeting with Canon William Lummis led him to take over his life-work of researching and documenting the final resting places of all Victoria Cross recipients. This task took Harvey to 48 countries over the next four decades. However, an accident during a visit to the Somme in 1992 left Harvey in a wheelchair for the remainder of his life and he later had to have a leg amputated. Monuments to Courage was finally published in 1999.

== Personal life ==
Harvey married once in 1968, to Ruth Ward. The couple had a son and two daughters. They divorced in 1979.

== Death ==
Harvey died in 2004 aged 57. He received obituaries in The Daily Telegraph and The Independent.

== Monuments to Courage ==

Monuments to Courage: Victoria Cross Monuments and Headstones is a two-volume book by Harvey on the last resting places of 1,322 of the 1,350 recipients of the Victoria Cross. The book features an introduction by Princess Alexandra and a foreword by Australian VC recipient Sir Arthur Roden Cutler.

Each entry gives the date of birth, date of action, and brief details of the Victoria Cross action, date of death, and place of burial or cremation where applicable. Where possible, photographs of the individual, his grave, and any memorial were included. Excluding the recent Iraq war recipient (Johnson Beharry), 28 Victoria Cross recipients were still alive at the time the book went to press, although several have since died.

The research for this work took Harvey 36 years of travelling to 48 countries in his search for unknown graves. His interest in the topic was awakened in the early 1960s when he assisted William Lummis into his researches into Victoria Cross recipients.

=== Details ===
- Harvey, David (1999). Monuments to Courage : Victoria Cross Headstones and Memorials. Vol.1, 1854–1916. Kevin & Kay Patience. OCLC 59437297.
- Harvey, David (1999). Monuments to Courage : Victoria Cross Headstones and Memorials. Vol.2, 1917–1982. Kevin & Kay Patience. OCLC 59437300.
- Monuments to Courage. Victoria Cross Headstones & Memorials. Naval & Military Press. 2000. ISBN 1843423561.
