= Edward James Boys =

British military historian

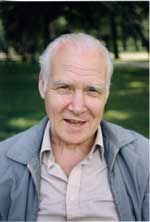
Edward James Boys

Edward James Boys (19 September 1916 – 1 July 2002) was a leading authority on the men of the cavalry regiments of the British Army who took part in the famous Charge of the Light Brigade of 1854 during the Crimean War of 1854–1856 between the United Kingdom and Russia.

== Military service ==
'Jim' Boys left school aged 14, and in 1937 he enlisted in the 2nd Battalion, Coldstream Guards and transferred to the regiment's 3rd Battalion when the battalion was posted overseas. From 1937 to 1939 he served in Egypt and Palestine, presumably during the 1936–1939 Arab revolt in Palestine. He served in Egypt during the early stages of World War II, and in Alexandria he met Greek-born Nitza Lemonia Asnay; he was captured at Tobruk in 1941 and spent the rest of the war in prisoner of war camps in Italy and Germany. In 1946, he married Nitza Asnay (1920–2002).

== Medal researcher ==
On his return to the United Kingdom Boys became a Prison Officer at HM Prison Wandsworth where he was in charge of a workshop manned by the prisoners which produced equipment for the armed services. He became interested in collecting medals during the 1950s, and he became an early member of the Orders and Medals Research Society. Boys took early retirement from the Prison Service in 1968, and then worked for a number of years for the Ministry of Defence, inspecting the manufacture of military equipment. Eventually, his interest in medals lead him to begin collecting material concerning the men of the Light Brigade who had taken part in the famous Charge of the Light Brigade in 1854.

Boys was tireless in the pursuit of information, and wherever possible he traced the life of every man of the Light Brigade from his birth through to his death, and in a number of cases traced their relatives to the present day to gain as much information as possible. The lives of many of these men are only recorded in the accounts he created.

For more than forty years Boys gathered information from a huge range of sources, including official records from the War Office, India Office, the Public Record Office, contemporary newspapers, census returns, church records, Registries of Births, Deaths and Marriages, and many local and national libraries.

He corresponded with descendants and wider-family members, modern-day regiments, and other organisations and individuals throughout the world, including the noted Charge of the Light Brigade historian Canon William Lummis, seeking and exchanging information, photographs and transcripts of letters and other published and unpublished documents.

As a result of his research, Jim Boys accumulated a substantial collection of contemporary material – photographs, paintings and other images, letters and autobiographies (including accounts of the Charge never previously published). To these he added modern photographs of medals, memorials and gravestones, most of which he took himself. He also owned a private collection of Crimean War medals awarded to 'Chargers'.

The result is widely regarded among many historians as being the most complete and authoritative record of the lives of men of the Light Brigade, and their families, in existence.

He lived for many years in Wandsworth with his wife Nitza Asnay Boys and his son Philip. An on-line archive of the research of E. J. Boys is currently being created.

Edward James Boys died in London in 2002.
