= Casquette d'Afrique =

French military headgear

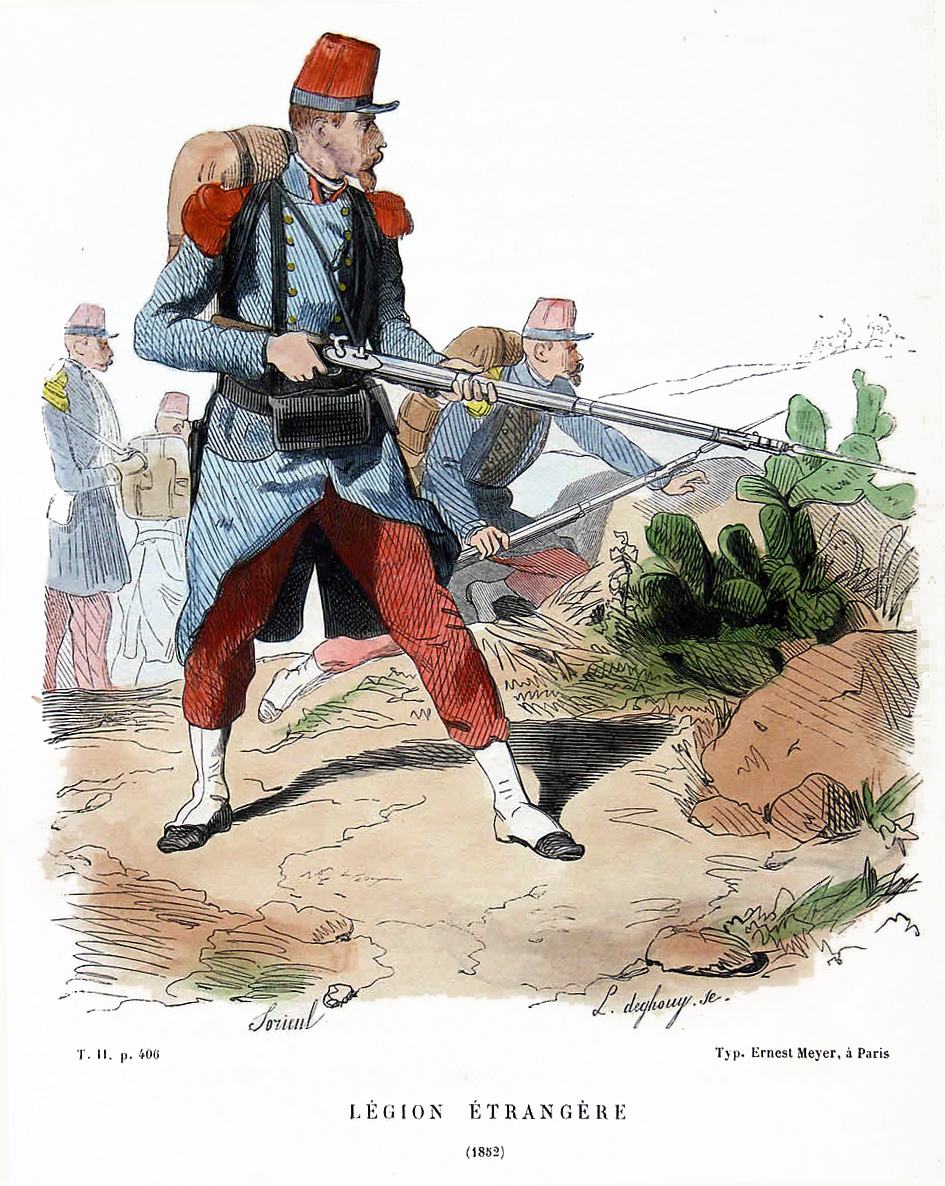
Casquette d'Afrique worn by a French foreign legionnaire

A casquette d'Afrique was a type of lightweight military headgear generally used by the French metropolitan and colonial armies from the early 1830s to the 1860s.

== Background ==
By the late 18th century/early 19th century, European military uniform had developed from a relatively easy-fitting, all-purpose coat/waistcoat-tunic/breeches/hat 'suit' of clothes worn by soldiers for all occasions into a separate formal parade-style uniform with stiff shako cap and another secondary simple uniform with soft cap for all other purposes. As most European armies' enemies would be other European armies, it was accepted convention that only the best-dress uniform was to be worn into battle, though concession may be given to vagaries of weather. However, countries with expanding colonies, such as Great Britain, did not see the same need for formality whilst fighting its colonial wars and secondary uniforms with local modifications, tended to be worn. France too adopted this thinking when it embarked on a programme of colonial expansion into Algeria in 1830.

== Description ==
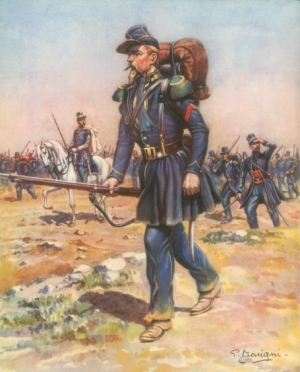
Another example of the casquette d'Afrique worn by a chasseur.

Initially dressed mainly in dark blue/crimson full-dress uniforms and heavy leather shakos covered in black cloth with large brass badge, the French soon found such a uniform impractical in the testing climate of Algeria. Soon, they were wearing their simpler, secondary uniforms with Napoleonic-style soft cap known as bonnet de police. This was a form of forage or large side cap comprising a long, tapered cloth bag with tassel at the point, having a large turn-up at the base of the cap. The turn-up was called a turban, whilst the tapered bag was called a flamme. The long flamme could be worn hanging down the side of the wearer's head and over the shoulder, or else it could be doubled up and tucked into the turban, with just the tassel hanging down through a notch in the front of the turban. For infantry, the flamme was garance (crimson) colour, whilst the turban was dark blue. Narrow lines of dark blue piping (passepoil) ran up four sides of the flamme to the point. A cloth badge, such as a bursting grenade, was often worn on the front of the turban.

== Evolution ==
As the bonnet de police had no visor, it could not shield wearers' eyes from the sun and alternative, visored, caps were being experimented with. One variety resembled a modern peaked cap with a wide crown and horizontal visor, with dark blue band and crimson top and undersides. Other styles appeared, cylindrical in shape, with slightly sunken crimson top, crimson sides (flamme), national red/white/blue cockade top front, and dark blue band (turban) with flat rounded visor and retractable leather neckflap. Early models had a stiff lining, but other models had cane (rattan) skeleton framing for weight-reduction. Obviously influenced by the old bonnet de police, this cap became known as the casquette d'Afrique (African cap) and became universal wear amongst France's European troops. Later models were more stylish and lightweight, one definitive trend being to taper the flamme/body toward the top, so the round top had a smaller diameter than the bottom of the cap and to tilt the flamme/body toward the front. Apart from being lighter, this also gave the cap a rakish, elegant appearance.

== New Shako ==
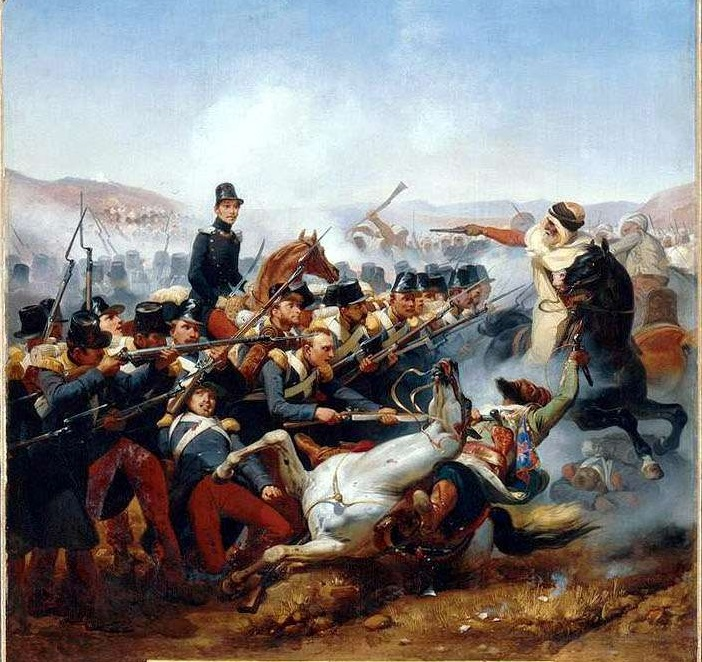
Cylindrical shako worn by French soldiers during the conquest of Algeria

In December 1844, a new black shako was introduced for the French Army, based on the shape of the casquette d'Afrique. This started a series of new shako models over the years, often associated with the glory years of the last Empire of Napoleon III. The new tapered shako symbolised France's prestige to the extent that French uniform style was copied by many important armies of the 1850s/60's, including the British Army, Russian Army, United States Army and even some of the German states.

== Replacement by Kepi ==
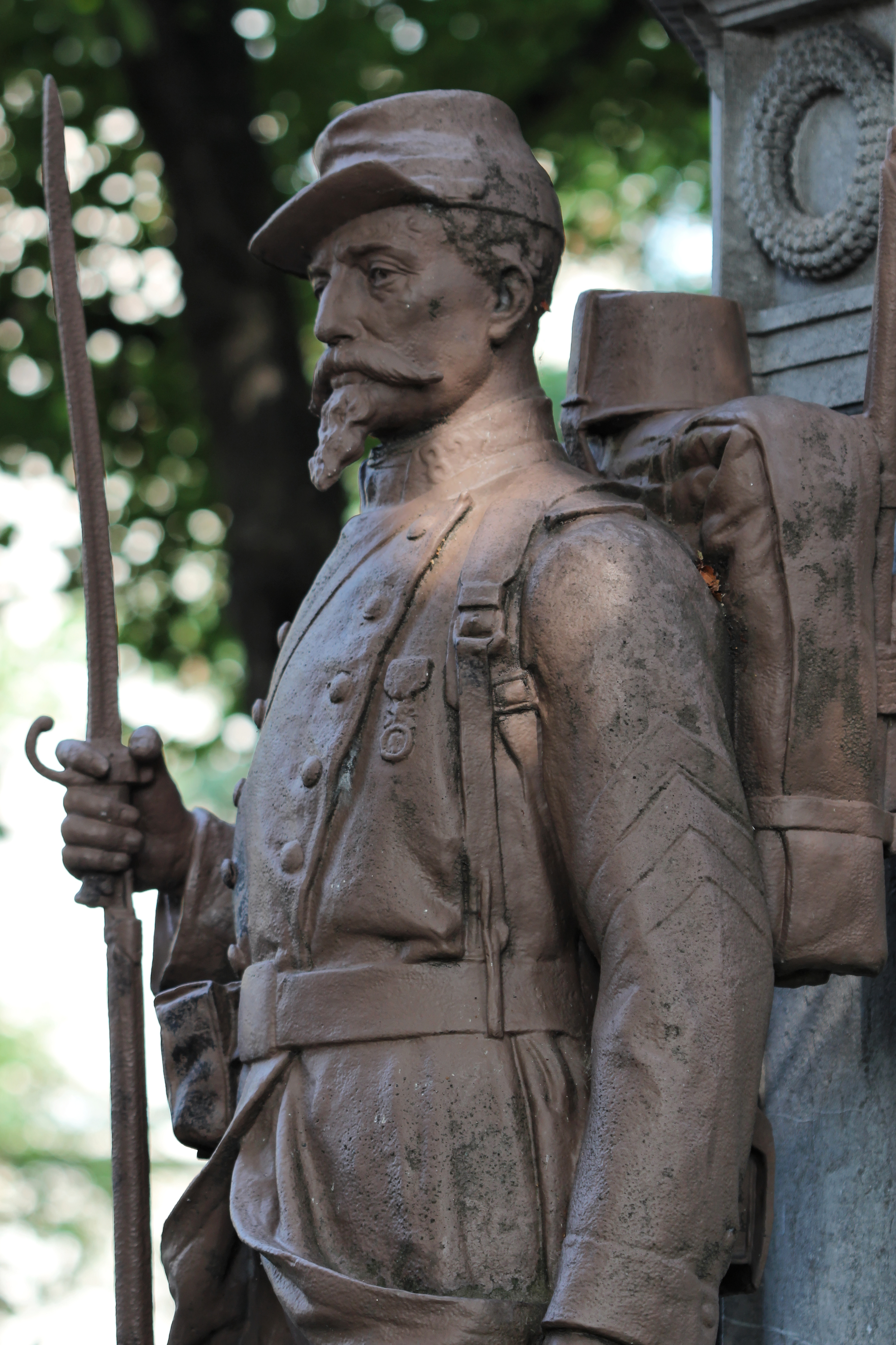
The kepi is a smaller version of the casquette d'Afrique

1852 saw the demise of the casquette d'Afrique, when a smaller, softer version was introduced, known as bonnet de police à visière - or more commonly - képi. The kepi was basically a casquette d'Afrique, reduced in overall size of body etc., with stiffening removed. The casquette didn't disappear entirely however, as France's famous European colonial cavalry, les Chasseurs d'Afrique continued to wear their bleu ciel/garance (light blue/crimson) casquette until 1939 as full dress, together with the more Arabic-looking chéchia style of fez. A famous Crimean photograph taken by Roger Fenton exists, showing a group of Chasseurs d'Afrique wearing their casquettes d'Afrique.
