= The Last of the Light Brigade =

1890 poem written by Rudyard Kipling

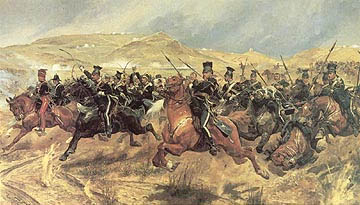
Caton Woodville Light Brigade

"The Last of the Light Brigade" is a poem written in 1890 by Rudyard Kipling echoing – thirty-six years after the event – Alfred Tennyson's famous poem The Charge of the Light Brigade. Employing synecdoche, Kipling uses his poem to expose the terrible hardship faced in old age by veterans of the Crimean War, as exemplified by the cavalry men of the light brigade who charged at the Battle of Balaclava. It describes a visit by the last twenty survivors of the charge to Tennyson (then in his eightieth year) to reproach him gently for not writing a sequel about the way in which England was treating its old soldiers. Some sources treat the poem as an account of a real event, but other commentators class the destitute old soldiers as allegorical, with the visit invented by Kipling to draw attention to the poverty in which the real survivors were living, in the same way that he evoked Tommy Atkins in "The Absent Minded Beggar".

== Reception ==
Unlike Tennyson's poem, and like first-person accounts of the Light Brigade, Kipling's poem was largely ignored.
