= Armand-Octave-Marie d'Allonville =

French general of division and senator

Armand d'Allonville
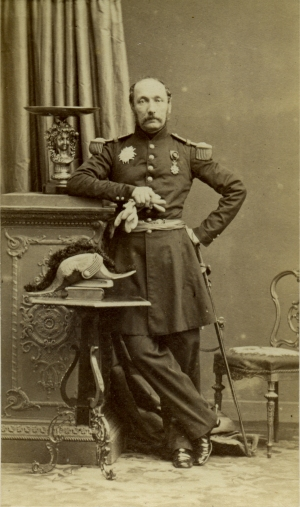
- General Armand d'Allonville
- Born: 21 January 1809; Hanover, Kingdom of Westphalia
- Died: 19 October 1867 (aged 58); Versailles, French Empire
- Burial place: Père Lachaise Cemetery
- Military career
- Allegiance: July Monarchy; French Second Republic; Second French Empire
- Branch: French Army
- Service years: 1830–1865
- Rank: General of Division
- Units: Spahis; Chasseurs d'Afrique
- Conflicts: Belgian Revolution: Siege of Antwerp; Conquest of Algeria: Battle of the Smala; Battle of Isly; Crimean War: Battle of Balaklava; Charge of the Light Brigade; Battle of Eupatoria
- Awards: Légion d'honneur Order of the Bath; Order of the Medjidie
- Other work: Senator

Viscount Armand-Octave-Marie d'Allonville (21 January 1809 – 19 October 1867) was a French general of division which distinguished himself during the French conquest of Algeria and the Crimean War. He was later appointed senator.

== Biography ==
=== Origins ===
Coat of arms of d'Allonville

Armand d'Allonville was born 21 January 1809 in Hanover, then under French occupation, from viscount Antoine Jean Baptiste d'Allonville (1765–1811) and Céleste Octavie de La Bourdonnaye (1787–1863). His family has a military heritage that dates back from the Crusades. A noble from Brittany, his father had emigrated during the French Revolution and d'Allonville was re-naturalized French in Rennes in 1830.

=== Early military career ===
After his graduation from the École d'application du Corps royal d'état-major, he entered the cavalry. He witnessed the Siege of Antwerp in 1832, as aide-de-camp of General Rulhières.

During the conquest of Algeria, he commanded an indigenous irregular cavalry squadron. After the battle of the Smala, he received the officer cross of the Légion d'honneur. At the Battle of Isly, he distinguished himself by taking the Moroccans' cannons with his Spahis.

In 1839, he was appointed lieutenant-colonel of the 1st Regiment of Spahis by Marshall de Saint Arnaud.

=== Napoleon III's coup ===
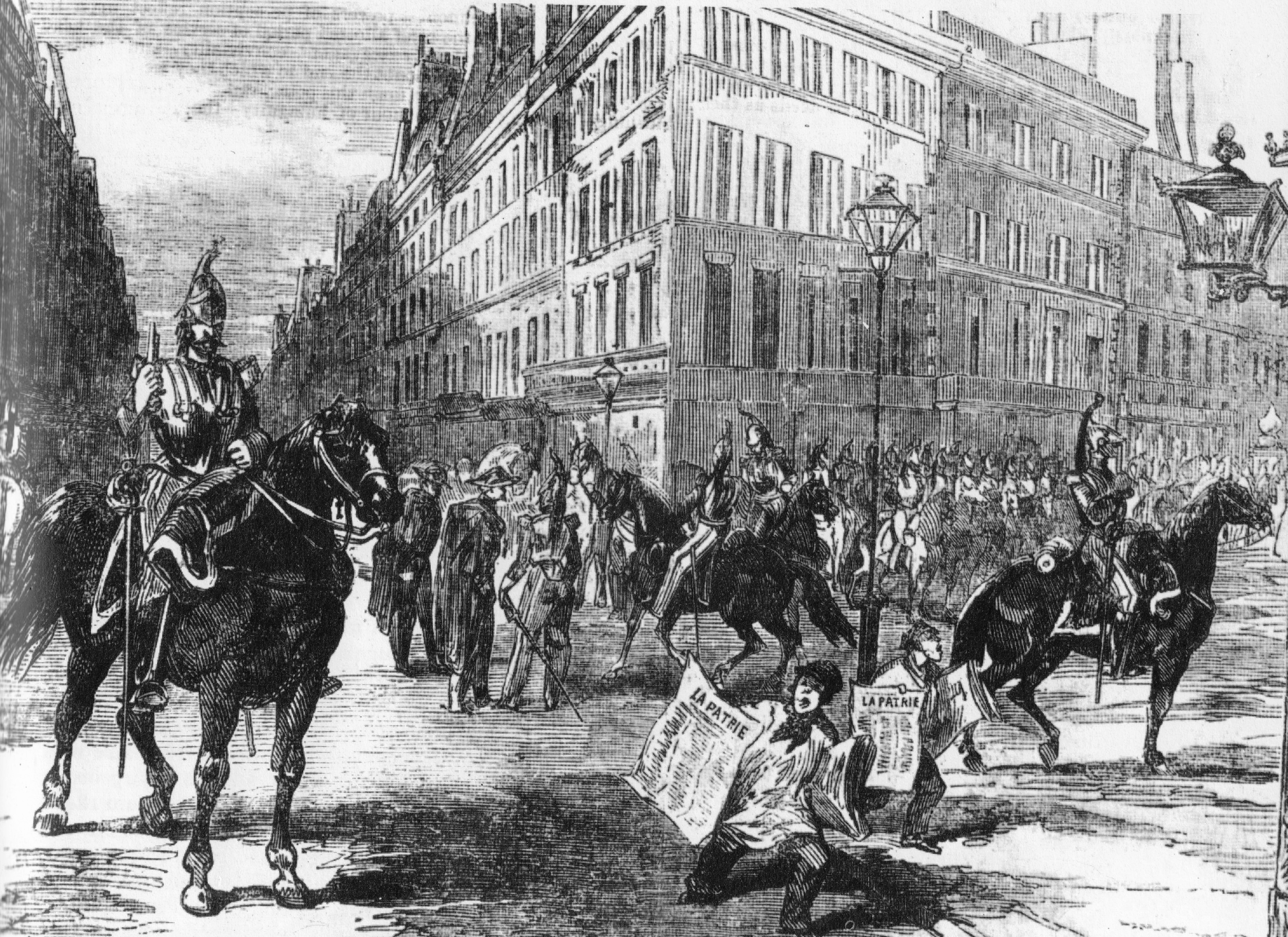
D'Allonville's cavalry in the street of Paris during Napoleon III's coup.

Colonel of the 5th Hussar Regiment in 1845, he was promoted general of brigade in 1851 and participated to Napoléon III's coup d'état, 2 December 1851. He commanded a division of cavalry on the Champs-Élysées, but did not meet hostility from the Parisian crowd.

=== Crimean War ===
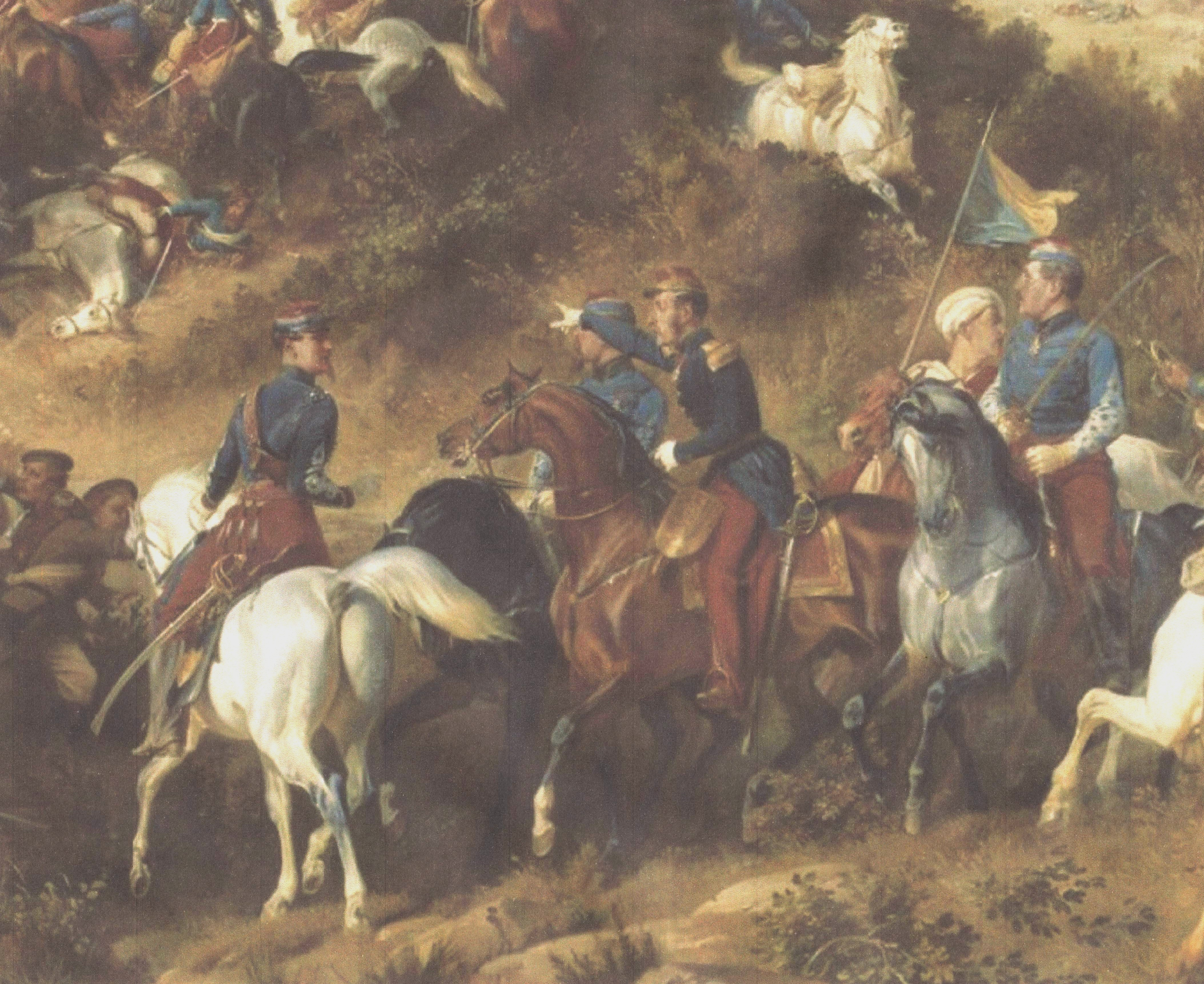
General d'Allonville leading the Chasseurs d'Afrique during the Charge of the Light Brigade

D'Allonville was the commandant of the Chasseurs d'Afrique brigade during the Charge of the Light Brigade. Under his command, the Chasseurs d'Afrique cleared the two half batteries of guns, two infantry battalions and Cossacks on the Fedyukhin Heights to ensure the British Light Brigade would not be hit by fire from that flank and later provided cover for the remaining elements of the Light Brigade as they withdrew.

For this, d'Allonville was promoted to general of division and commanded, from 20 May 1855, the 1st brigade, comprising the 1st and 4th hussar regiments, and the 2nd brigade, comprising the 6th and 7th dragoon regiments.

At the battle of Eupatoria, d'Allonville led the 4th hussar and the 6th and 7th dragoon regiments and was made Grand-Croix of the Légion d'honneur and received the Order of the Bath from the British and the Order of the Medjidie from the Turks.

=== Later life ===
D'Allonville's declining health led him to leave active service in the French army and he became conseiller-général of Ille-et-Vilaine. He was appointed senator in December 1865 and died 19 October 1867 in Versailles. He was interred in Père Lachaise Cemetery in Paris.

== Bibliography ==
- D'allonville's genealogy (FR)
- Le livre d'or de l'Algérie, Narcisse Faucon, Challamel et Cie Éditeurs Librairie Algérienne et Coloniale, 1889 (FR)
- British Military Intelligence in the Crimean War, 1854–1856, par Stephen M. Harris.
- La contestation chez les cadres de l'Armée franc̜aisede 1650 à 1986, par Pierre Denis (FR)
