= Edward Richard Woodham =

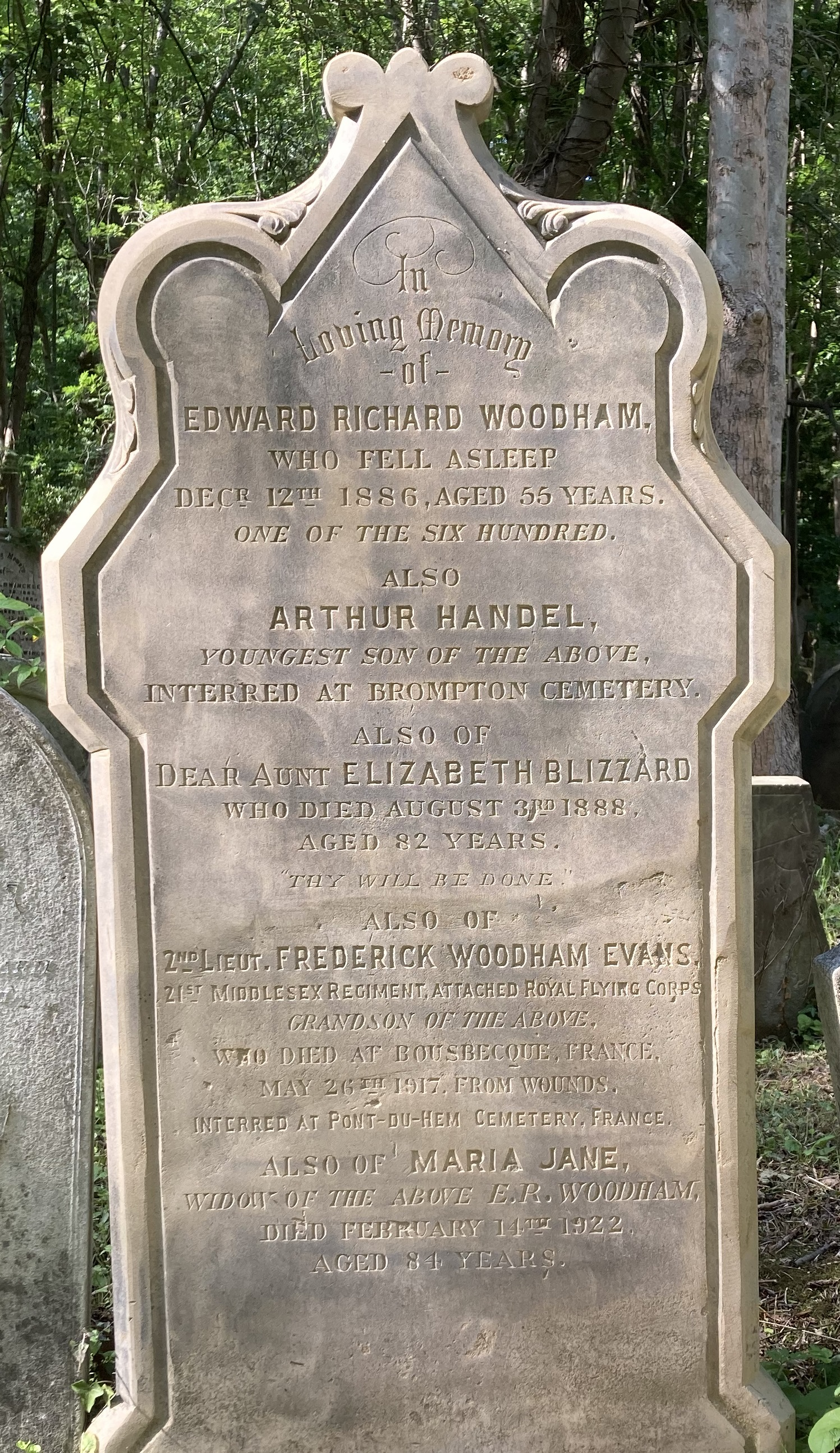
Grave of Edward Richard Woodham in Highgate Cemetery

Edward Richard Woodham (20 February 1831 – 12 December 1886) was one of the survivors of the Charge of the Light Brigade on 25 October 1854 during the Crimean War.

As the "Chairman of the committee for the celebration", he organised a 21st Anniversary dinner for the survivors of the "Charge" (at the Alexandra Palace in London), reported in detail in the Illustrated London News dated Saturday 30 October 1875. The senior commander surviving, Lord Lucan, was not present; the newspaper account suggests that he was not invited.

In the article, there were reproduced the recollections of a number of the survivors including those of Edward Richard Woodham. The Hussars' museum has confirmed that Edward Richard Woodham had enlisted in the 11th Hussars in June 1847 and that after the "Charge" he had spent a short period in hospital. The Bristol Town Council archive office has confirmed that Edward Richard Woodham was born on 20 February 1831 and his father (a cooper) was born on 18 November 1798. Both were born in Bristol and were baptised at St. Paul's Church in Bristol.

He died on 12 December 1886, aged 55.
