= Victoria Cross and George Cross Association =

British military organisation

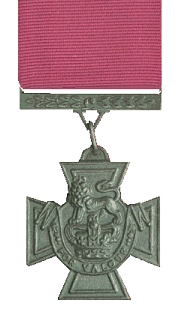
The Victoria Cross

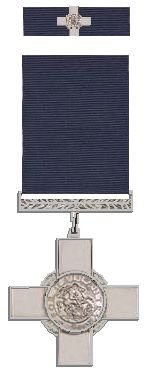
The George Cross

The Victoria Cross and George Cross Association is made up of holders of the Victoria Cross (VC), Britain's highest military award for bravery in the presence of the enemy, and the George Cross (GC), the equivalent award for civilians and also for those military personnel who have displayed conspicuous bravery not in the presence of the enemy.

Holders of these awards receive an annuity and attend reunions which receive coverage in the national press. Membership is dwindling for various reasons including the fact that there has not been a "total war" for many years. Canon William Lummis was the chaplain to the Association.

The Victoria Cross and George Cross Association is Headquartered in London at Horse Guards, Whitehall SW1A 2AX, United Kingdom.

== Officers of the VC and GC Association ==
=== Patron ===
- Her Majesty The Queen, 1957–2022
- His Majesty The King, 2024–present

=== President ===
- Major The Rt Hon. Sir Winston Spencer Churchill KG OM CH TD DL FRS RA, 1959–1965
- Brigadier The Rt Hon. Sir John Smyth Bt VC MC, 1965–1983
- Her Majesty Queen Elizabeth The Queen Mother LG LT CI GCVO GBE CC ONZ RRC OD CD FRS FRSE FSA, 1983–2002
- His Royal Highness The Prince Charles, Prince of Wales KG KT GCB OM AK QSO CC GCL CMM CD PC ADC, 2003–2022
- His Royal Highness The Prince William, Prince of Wales KG KT GCB PC ADC, 2024–present

=== Vice president ===
- Major The Rt Hon. The Viscount De L'Isle VC KG GCMG GCVO KStJ PC, 1983–1991
- Lieutenant Sir Roden Cutler VC AK KCMG KCVO CBE KStJ, 1991–2002
- Major The Rt Hon. Sir Tasker Watkins VC GBE KStJ QC DL, 2002–2007

=== Chairman ===
- Brigadier The Rt Hon. Sir John Smyth Bt VC MC, 1957–1971
- Rear Admiral Godfrey Place VC CB CVO DSC, 1971–1994
- Colonel Stuart Archer GC OBE ERD FRIBA, 1994–2006
- Chief Superintendent Jim Beaton GC CVO, 2006–2014
- Major Peter Norton GC, 2014–2022
- Christopher Finney GC, 2022–present

=== Secretary ===
- Didy Grahame OBE MVO, 1970–1972, 1981–2014
- Rebecca Maciejewska, 2014–present

=== Chaplain ===
- Canon William Lummis MC, 1956–1985

== See also ==
- List of living George Cross recipients
