= Chasseurs d'Afrique =

Military unit type of France

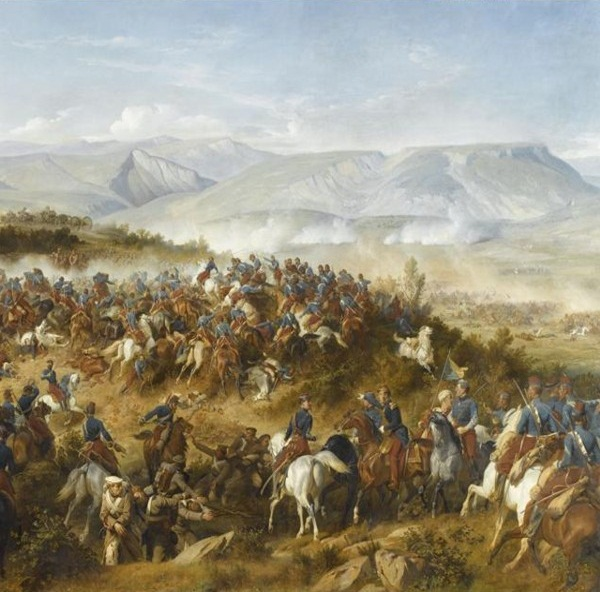
The Chasseurs d'Afrique, led by General d'Allonville, clearing Russian artillery from the Fedyukhin Heights during the battle of Balaclava.

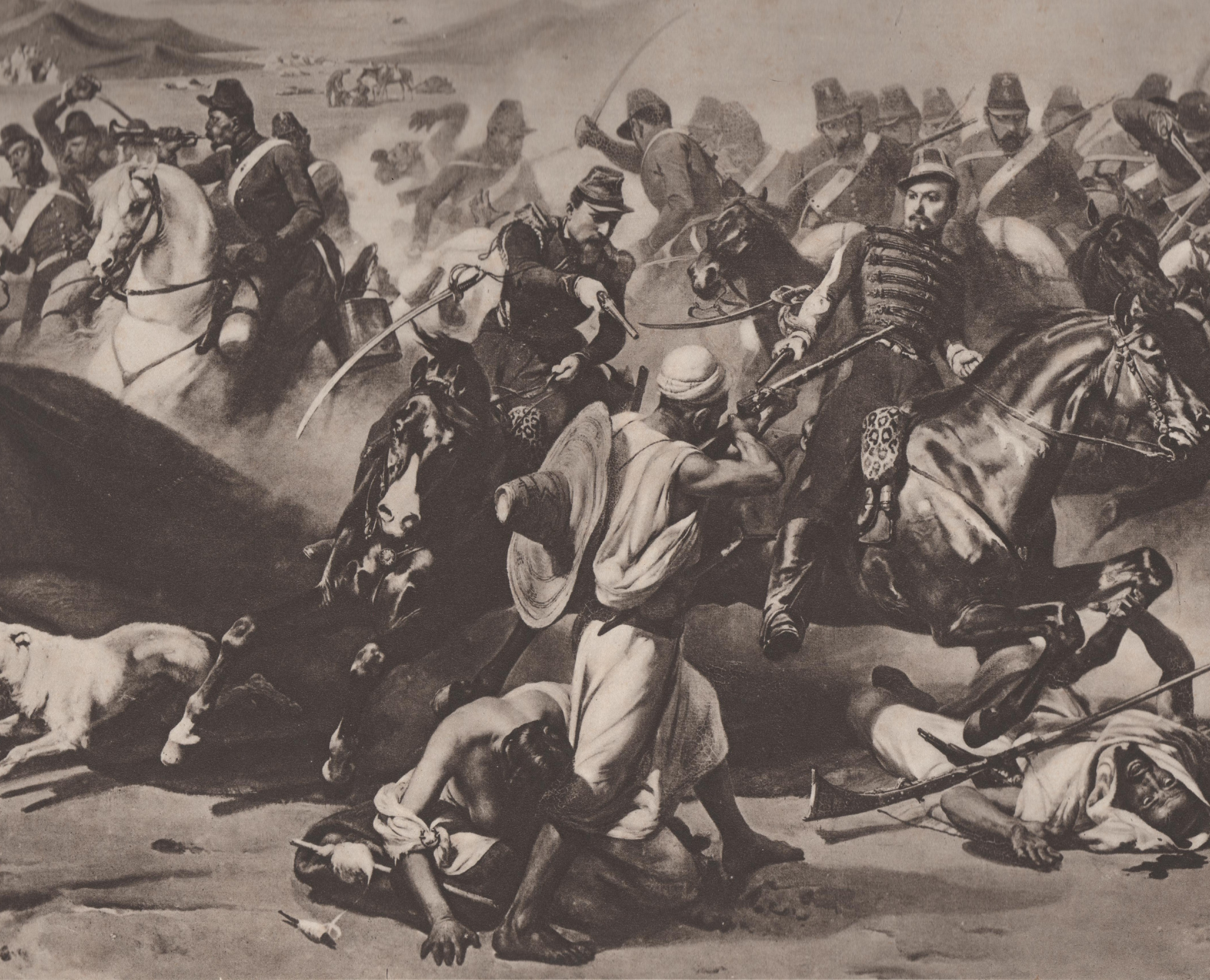
Chasseurs d'Afrique during the battle of the Smala.

The Chasseurs d'Afrique were a light cavalry corps of chasseurs in the French Armée d'Afrique (Army of Africa). First raised in 1831 from regular French cavalry posted to Algeria, they numbered five regiments by World War II. For most of their history they were recruited from either French volunteers or French settlers in North Africa doing their military service. As such they were the mounted equivalent of the French Zouave infantry. The other major cavalry element in the Armée d'Afrique were the Spahis—recruited from the indigenous peoples of Algeria, Tunisia, and Morocco with mostly French officers.

== History ==
First raised in 1831, shortly after the French occupation of Algiers, the Chasseurs d'Afrique (Chass. d'Af. in common vernacular) were created through transfers from the chasseurs à cheval, other metropolitan cavalry regiments and some infantry units. Initially about 40 members of each squadron were locally recruited indigenous horsemen. Two additional regiments were created in 1832 and 1833 respectively, while the Arab and Berber troopers were transferred to the newly organised Spahis in 1836.

In addition to numerous campaigns in North Africa, these colorful regiments also served in the Crimean War, Second Italian War of Independence, Franco-Prussian War, Indochina, France's invasion of Mexico, Dahomey (1892), Madagascar (1895) and both world wars. The 1st and 4th Chasseurs d'Afrique Regiments distinguished themselves by securing the flank of Lord Cardigan during the ill-fated Charge of the Light Brigade. On this and other occasions they used their characteristic African tactic of advancing rapidly in open order, in contrast to the rigid lines of the Light Brigade.

On 5 May 1863 the 1st Chasseurs d'Afrique distinguished itself in a clash with Mexican lancers during the Battle of San Pablo del Monte. The regimental flag was subsequently decorated with the Cross of the Legion of Honour, the first French cavalry regiment to receive this distinction. May 5 remains the annual day of celebration for the modern Chasseurs d'Afrique.

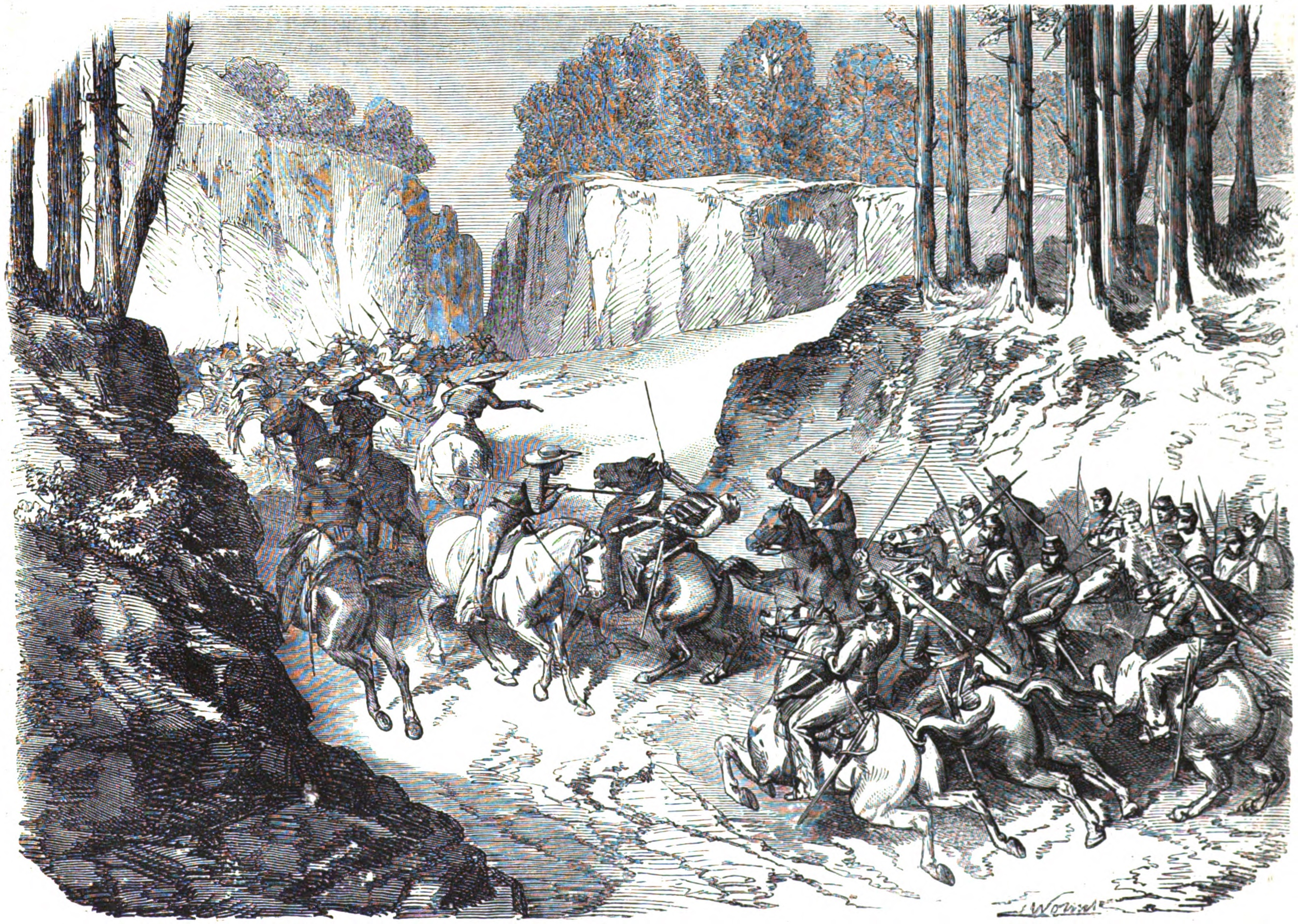
Chasseurs d'Afrique at the Battle of San Pablo del Monte.

All four of the regiments then in existence participated in the Franco-Prussian War of 1870, with only depot squadrons remaining in Algeria. They suffered heavy casualties in a series of charges at the Battle of Sedan. Drawing on reservists and volunteers it was possible to reconstitute three provisional regiments, two of which continued to fight on as part of the new Republican armies.

== World War I ==
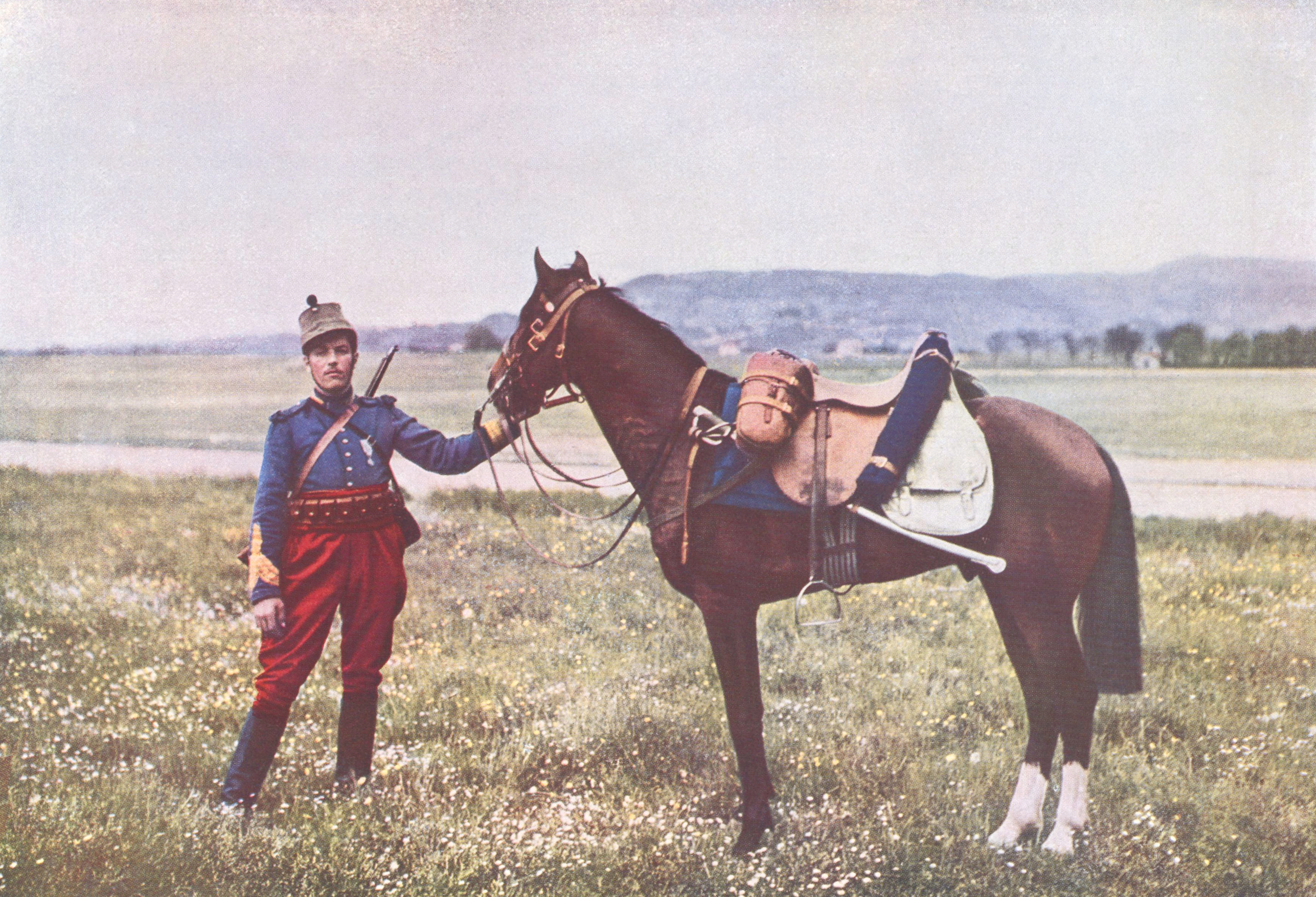
A Chasseurs d'Afrique soldier at the First Battle of the Marne, 1914

At the outbreak of World War I in 1914, six Chasseurs d'Afrique regiments were in existence. The 1^{er} and 2^{e} RCA had detached squadrons on active service in eastern Morocco while the four remaining regiments were on garrison duty in Algeria and Tunisia. Seven regiments of Chasseurs d'Afrique (including three marching regiments) were transferred to France between 1914 and 1918.

Four squadrons were present during the Gallipoli campaign with the Corps Expéditionnaire d'Orient, the unit being renamed on 29 July 1915 as the 8th Chasseurs d'Afrique Marching Regiment. Two squadrons of the 1^{er} and 4^{e} RCA ended the war in the Middle East fighting against the Turks as part of the 5th Light Horse Brigade, while the 5^{e} RCA detached squadrons to serve in the Balkans.

== Mechanisation ==
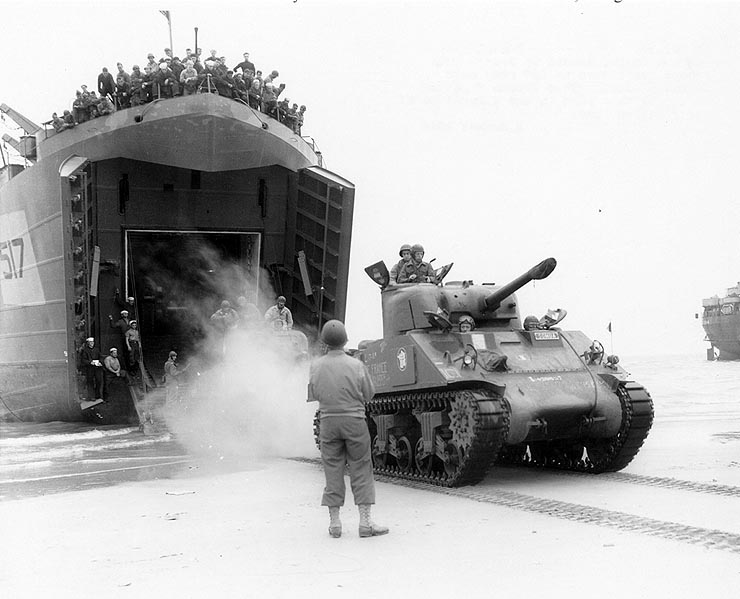
The M4 Sherman Ile de France of 12e RCA, landing in Normandy.

In 1933, the Régiments de Chasseurs d'Afrique (RCA) began the process of conversion to mechanised units. The first vehicles adopted were White TBC armoured cars, followed by White-Laffly 50 AMs. Both models were obsolete for European warfare but suitable for colonial campaigning. Other vehicles were provided for individual squadrons and in 1939 Hotchkiss H35 and H39 light tanks were received by the 1^{er} RCA.

On the outbreak of World War II (September 1939) the Chasseurs d'Afrique regiments were deployed as follows:

- 1^{er} RCA in Morocco;
- 2^{e}, 3^{e}, and 5^{e} RCA in Algeria;
- 4^{e} RCA in Tunisia;

Only the 1^{er} and 4^{e} RCA were fully mechanised at this date, the other regiments comprising a mix of mounted and mechanised squadrons.

In 1941, 6^{e} and 7^{e} RCA were created in the Levant, that is in Syria and Lebanon. Both were involved in heavy fighting against Allied forces in 1941 Operation Exporter, equipped with 90 tanks (mostly Renault R-35 with a few Renault FTs) and a similar number of armoured cars.

In the course of World War II the process of mechanisation was completed. The 3^{e} and 5^{e} RCA were equipped with M4 Sherman and M5 light tanks. The 5^{e} RCA notably landed in Provence in August 1944, and was one of the first units to be fully operational for combat. It was engaged in several battles during the taking of Toulon, in the Rhone valley, through Burgundy, Alsace, and in the Black Forest. The regiment earned the Rhine and Danube badge.

The dissolution dates for the individual regiments were:

- 2nd Chasseurs d'Afrique Regiment
- 4th Chasseurs d'Afrique Regiment
- 5th Chasseurs d'Afrique Regiment
- 6th Chasseurs d'Afrique Regiment
- 7th Chasseurs d'Afrique Regiment (1914–16, 1940–63)
- 8th Chasseurs d'Afrique Regiment (stationed in Tunisia after World War II, became 8^{e} régiment inter-armes de Bizerte 1961, dissolved 1963).
- 9th Chasseurs d'Afrique Regiment (1941–1959)
- 10th Chasseurs d'Afrique Autonomous Group (June 1941–1943)
- 11th Chasseurs d'Afrique Regiment (1941–October 1961)

== Modern regiment ==
Algerian independence brought an end to the corps through a series of disbandments and transfers between 1962 and 1964, after over a century of service. However one regiment (1st Chasseurs d'Afrique Regiment) was re-established in 1998 to preserve the force's traditions. The modern regiment is one of the mechanised units of the French Army. Now stationed at Canjuers, it is divided into one instruction squadron and three combat squadrons and is equipped with approximately 45 armoured vehicles.

Two other training centers also have names associated with the 3rd and 12th Regiments.

Serving units today:

- 1st Chasseurs d'Afrique Regiment at Canjuers Camp
- 3rd Chasseurs d'Afrique Regiment at Valdahon (training centre).
- 12th Chasseurs d'Afrique Regiment at Bitche, reformed 2019 as Centre de formation initiale de la 2^{e} brigade blindée (training centre).

== Uniforms ==
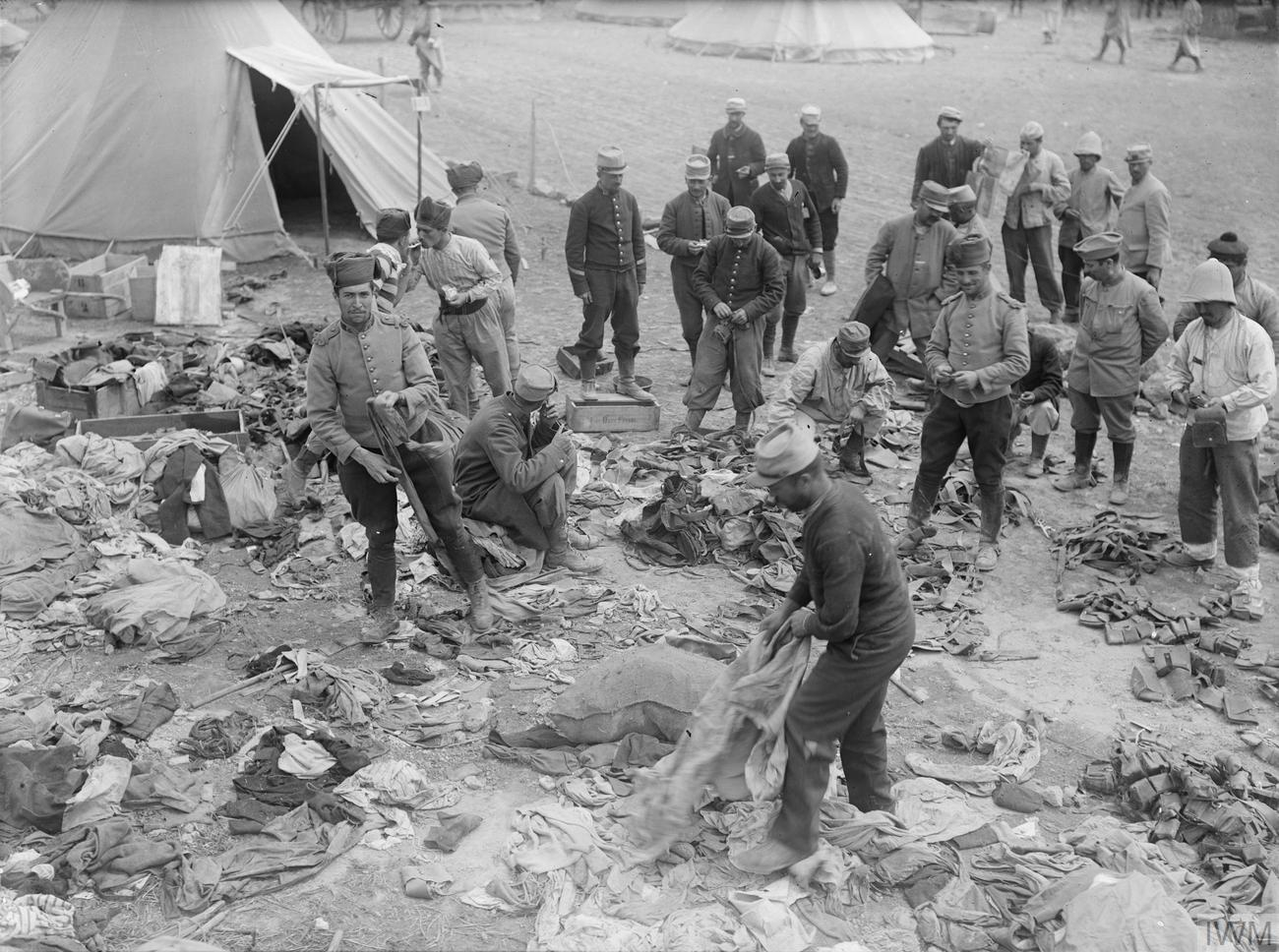
Troopers and Legionnaires seen in camp at Sedd el Bahr on 6 May 1915, sorting out salvaged kit and equipment. The troopers wearing red fezzes have been wrongly labelled as Zouaves. The troopers are wearing the light blue tunics and red breeches of the Chasseurs d'Afrique rather than the short open jacket (veste arabe) and voluminous trousers (serouel) of the zouaves

The Chasseurs d'Afrique were until 1914 clothed in light blue tunics tucked into a red sash and red breeches. Their normal headdress was the taconnet—a light blue and red shako, similar in shape to that worn by the equivalent light cavalry regiments (hussars and chasseurs à cheval) of the metropolitan army, but worn with a white or light khaki cover. Prior to 1873 the casquette d'Afrique had been worn. The traditional fez and sash were worn off duty or when in barracks until World War II. The light blue tunics had yellow facings and reportedly earned the Chasseurs d'Afrique the nickname of "Blue Butchers" amongst some of their opponents.

From 1915, as was the case with other units of the Armée d'Afrique, a more practical khaki uniform was adopted for service. The khaki uniforms worn by the Chasseurs d'Afrique from 1915 onwards were distinguished by dark blue collar patches with yellow braiding and regimental numbers. The modern armoured regiment had by 2014 reintroduced the historic red sash, and on occasion the fez, for parade. More commonly worn is the light blue and red kepi of the French cavalry.

== American Civil War ==
The name was also applied to the first all African-American regiment formed by the United States Army in New Orleans in 1862.

== See also ==
- French colonial flags
- French Colonial Empire
- List of French possessions and colonies

== External sources ==
- Gazette des Uniformes, Juillet-août 2005.
- R. Huré. L'Armée d'Afrique 1830–1962. Paris: Charles-Lavauzelle, 1977.
- Jouineau, André (2009a) [2008]. Officiers et soldats de l'armée française Tome 1 : 1914 [Officers and Soldiers of the French Army Volume I: 1914]. Officers and Soldiers #11. Translated by McKay, Alan. Paris: Histoire & Collections. ISBN 978-2-35250-104-6.
- Jouineau, André (2009b) [2009]. Officiers et soldats de l'armée française Tome 2 : 1915-1918 [Officers and Soldiers of the French Army Volume II: 1915-18]. Officers and Soldiers #12. Translated by McKay, Alan. Paris: Histoire & Collections. ISBN 978-2-35250-105-3.
- Sicard, Jacques; Vauvillier, François (1999). Les Chasseurs d'Afrique. Paris: Histoire et collections. ISBN 2-908182-87-4..
