= The Charge of the Light Brigade (poem) =

1854 poem by Alfred, Lord Tennyson

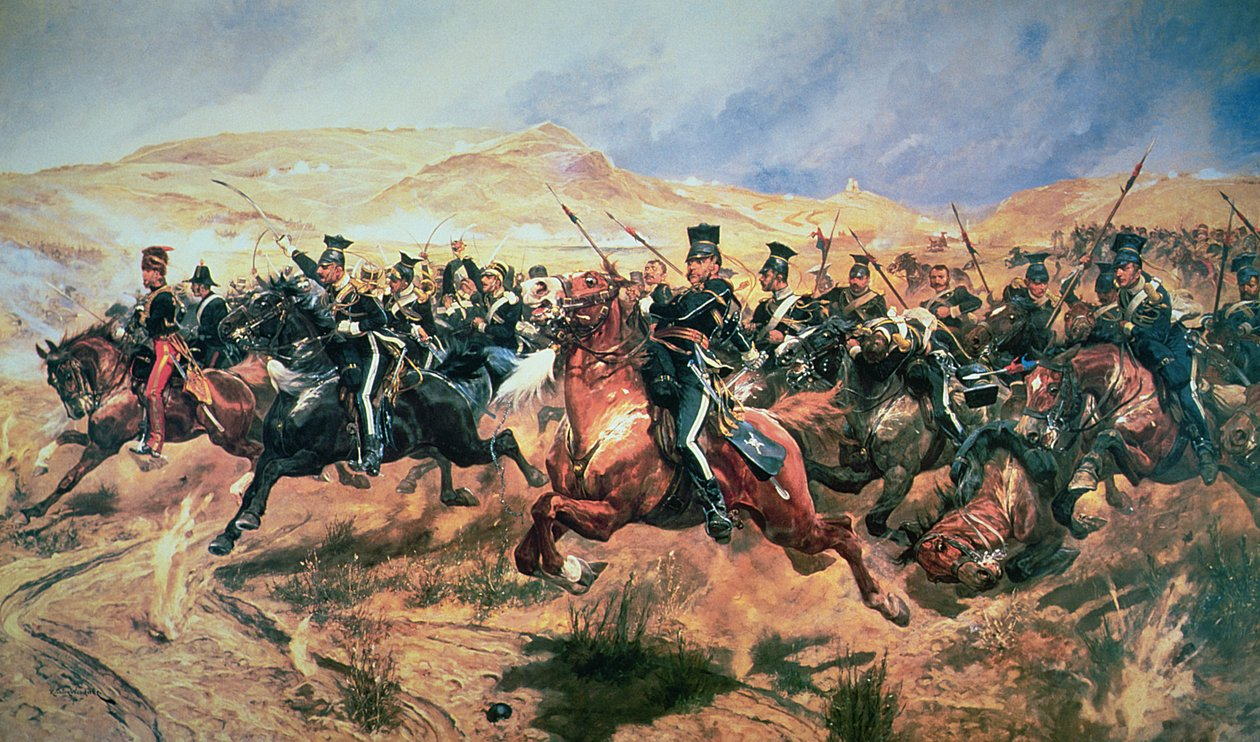
- Richard Caton Woodville Jr.'s 1894 painting of the eponymous Charge of the Light Brigade, the event that inspired the poem
- Written: 2 December 1854
- Country: United Kingdom
- Language: English
- Publication date: 9 December 1854
- Metre: Dactylic metre

Full text
- The Charge of the Light Brigade (Tennyson) at Wikisource

"The Charge of the Light Brigade" is an 1854 narrative poem by Alfred, Lord Tennyson about the cavalry charge of the same name at the Battle of Balaclava during the Crimean War. He wrote the original version on 2 December 1854, and it was published on 9 December 1854 in The Examiner. He was the Poet Laureate of the United Kingdom at the time. The poem was subsequently revised and expanded for inclusion in Maud and Other Poems (1855).

== History ==
=== Composition ===
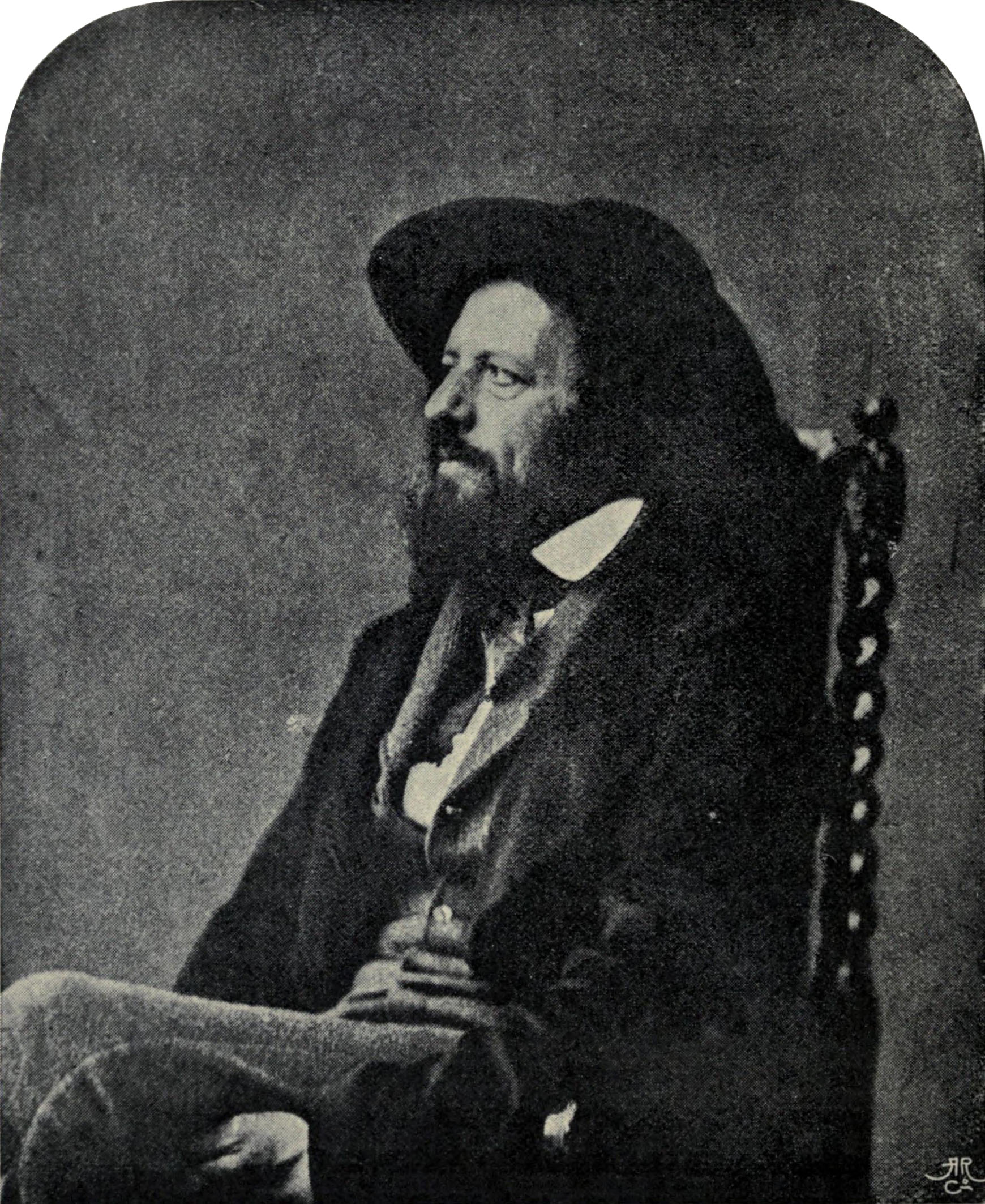
Tennyson as photographed by Lewis Carroll in 1857

During 1854, when the United Kingdom was engaged in the Crimean War, Tennyson wrote several patriotic poems under various pseudonyms. Scholars speculate that Tennyson created his pen names because these verses used a traditional structure Tennyson employed in his earlier career but suppressed during the 1840s, worrying that poems like "The Charge of the Light Brigade" (which he initially signed only A.T.) "might prove not to be decorous for a poet laureate".

The poem was written after the Light Cavalry Brigade suffered great casualties in the Battle of Balaclava. Tennyson wrote the poem based on two articles published in The Times: the first, published on 13 November 1854, contained the sentence "The British soldier will do his duty, even to certain death, and is not paralyzed by the feeling that he is the victim of some hideous blunder," the last three words of which provided the inspiration for his phrase "Some one had blunder'd." The poem was written in a few minutes on 2 December of the same year, based on a recollection of The Times's account; Tennyson wrote other similar poems, like "Riflemen Form!", in a very similar manner.

=== Later versions ===
Tennyson made revisions to the poem due to criticisms by the American poet Frederick Goddard Tuckerman and others; these were published in Tennyson's volume Maud and Other Poems (1855).

At the suggestion of Jane, Lady Franklin, Tennyson sent a thousand copies of a single-sheet version of the poem to be distributed among soldiers in the Crimea. For this he rethought the revisions in Maud and Other Poems, and this rethought version was used for the second edition of Maud, in 1856.

Tennyson recited this poem onto a wax cylinder in 1890.

=== Kipling's postscript ===
Rudyard Kipling wrote "The Last of the Light Brigade" (1891) some 40 years after the appearance of "The Charge of the Light Brigade". His poem focuses on the terrible hardships faced in old age by veterans of the Crimean War, as exemplified by the cavalry men of the Light Brigade. Its purpose was to shame the British public into offering financial assistance.

== First draft ==
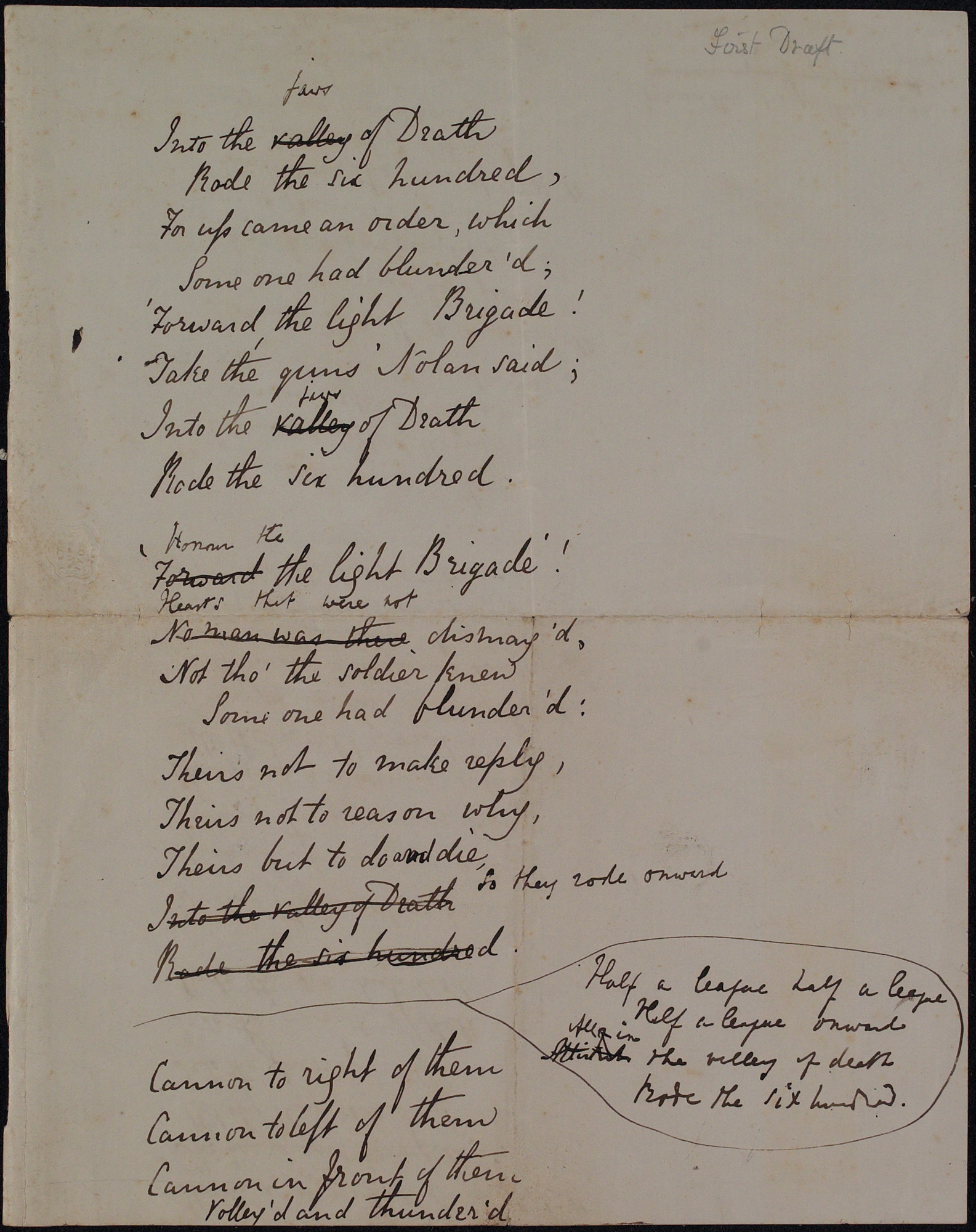

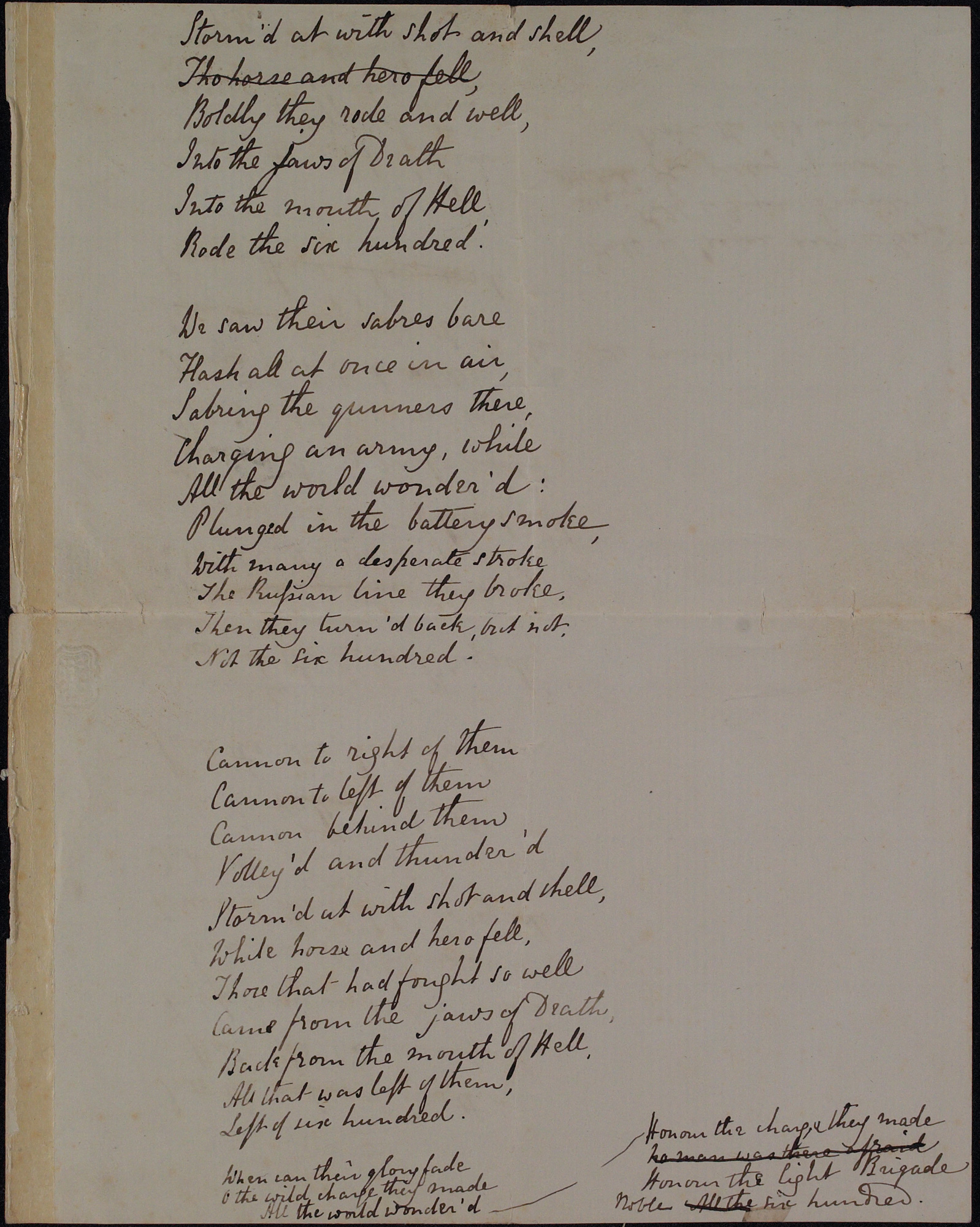

== First World War parody ==
The website "AllPoetry" contains a parody and analysis of the Tennyson original. The parody was by Ewart Alan Mackintosh and was entitled "The Charge of the Light Brigade brought up to date", and was composed during World War I. Its lines include "was there a man dismayed, yes, they were damned afraid" .

== Cultural references ==
The Charge of the Light Brigade
1890 recording by Alfred, Lord Tennyson on Edison wax cylinder

- The photograph Into the Jaws of Death (1944) depicting the Normandy landings in World War II is titled after a line in the poem's third stanza.
- "The world wonders" is a near quotation misunderstood in a communication during the Battle of Leyte Gulf (1944) in World War II.
- The poem inspired the Iron Maiden song The Trooper (1983).
- The poem is quoted prolifically by Mr Ramsay in the 1927 Virginia Woolf novel To The Lighthouse.
- The poem is quoted, albeit incorrectly, by Timothy Hutton's character (based on convicted spy Christopher Boyce) in the movie The Falcon and the Snowman (1985)
