= Charge of the Light Brigade (disambiguation) =

The Charge of the Light Brigade was an infamous cavalry charge.

The Charge of the Light Brigade may also refer to:

- The Charge of the Light Brigade (poem), by Alfred, Lord Tennyson
- The Charge of the Light Brigade (1912 film), a silent film
- The Charge of the Light Brigade (1936 film), a black and white film
- The Charge of the Light Brigade (1968 film), a colour film
