= Light Cavalry (disambiguation) =

Light cavalry are lightly armed and armoured troops mounted on horses.

Light Cavalry may also refer to:

- Light Cavalry HAC, a volunteer organisation associated with the City of London
- Light Cavalry (horse)
- Light Cavalry (1927 film)
- Light Cavalry (1935 French film)
- Light Cavalry (1935 German film)
- Leichte Kavallerie (Light Cavalry), an operetta by Franz von Suppé, notable for the Light Cavalry Overture
