= Thin Red Line (Battle of Balaclava) =

Episode in the Battle of Balaclava

- Part of Battle of Balaclava, Crimean War
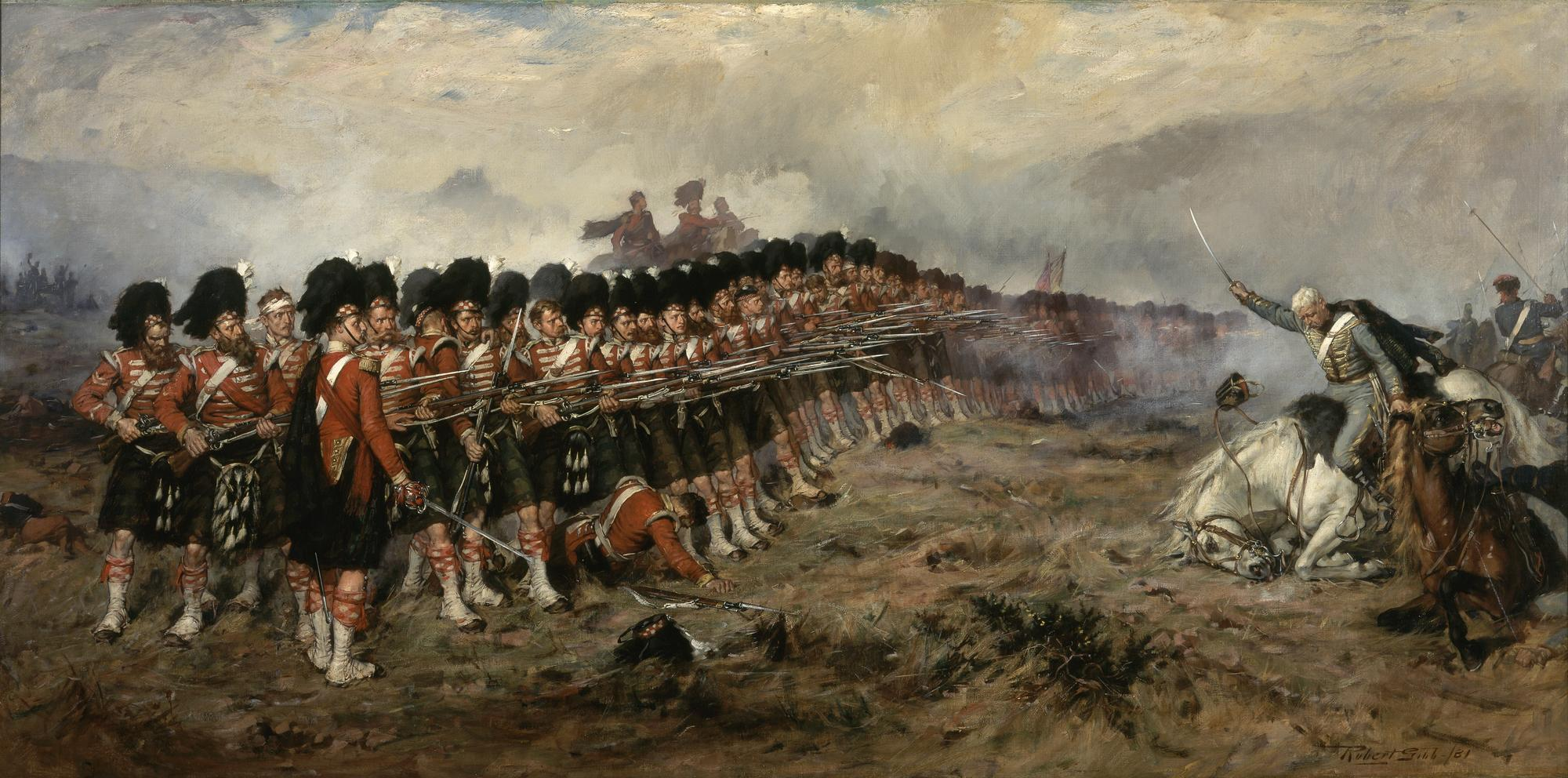
- The Thin Red Line; Robert Gibb, 1881
Date	25 October 1854
Location	44°31′23″N 33°35′55″E
Result	British victory

Belligerents
United Kingdom; Ottoman Empire	Russian Empire

Commanders and leaders
(United Kingdom) Colin Campbell, 1st Baron Clyde	(Russian Empire) Ivan Ryzhov

Strength
500 Highlanders and 350 Turkish forces	400 Russian forces

The Thin Red Line described an episode of the Battle of Balaclava on 25 October 1854, during the Crimean War. In the incident, around 500 men of the 93rd Sutherland Highlanders led by Sir Colin Campbell, aided by a small force of 100 walking wounded, 40 detached Guardsmen, and supported by a substantial force of Turkish infantrymen, formed a line of fire against the Russian cavalry. Previously, Campbell's Highland Brigade had taken part in actions at the Battle of Alma and the Siege of Sevastopol. There were more Victoria Crosses presented to the Highland soldiers at that time than at any other. The event was lionised in the British press and became an icon of the qualities of the British soldier in a war that was arguably poorly managed and increasingly unpopular.

== The battle ==
A Russian cavalry force of 2,500, commanded by General Ryzhov, was advancing on the camp of the British cavalry. About 400 Russians were involved in the incident. It was early morning, and the only troops between the oncoming cavalry and Balaklava was the 93rd Regiment.

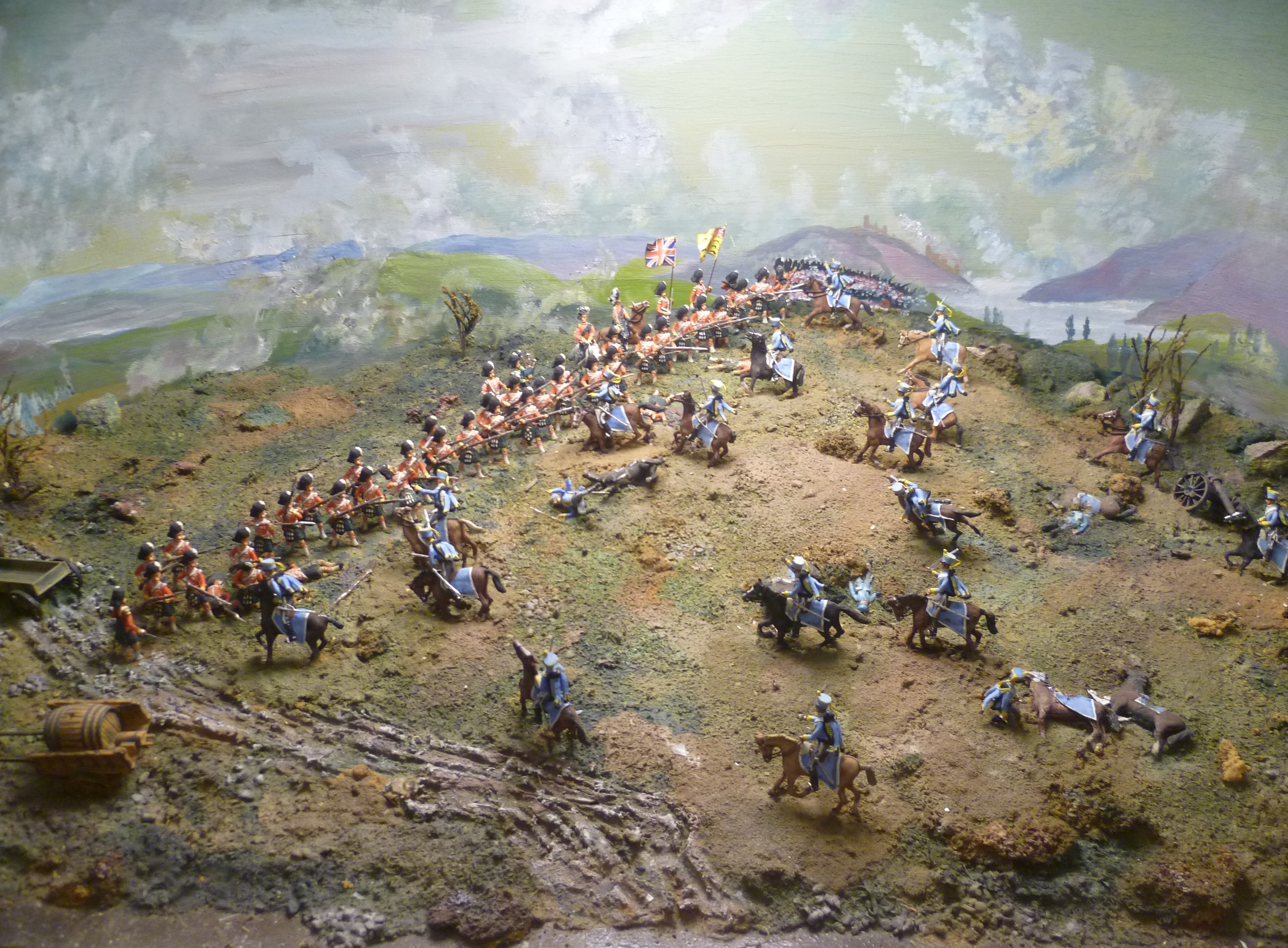
A diorama of the action in the Regimental Museum at Stirling Castle

Colin Campbell, 1st Baron Clyde, is said to have told his men, "There is no retreat from here, men. You must die where you stand." Sir Colin's aide John Scott is said to have replied, "Aye, Sir Colin. If needs be, we'll do that." Campbell felt he had insufficiently trained men to form square, and arranged the 93rd into a line two deep—later called the "thin red line" because convention of the time prescribed a line four deep—to meet the cavalry charge. As the Russian cavalry approached, the Turks on the flanks broke and fled. The 93rd discharged two volleys, at 800 and 500 yards (730 and 460 m). They did not get a chance to discharge one at point-blank range as the Russians turned away. Accounts of the Highlanders state that they started forward for a counter-charge before the final volley, but Sir Colin stopped them with a cry of "93rd, damn you Highlanders for all that eagerness!"

Canadian historian George T. Denison, in his book A History of Cavalry from the Earliest Times, With Lessons for the Future, wrote "... the Russian squadrons had no intention whatever of charging, but were simply at the time making demonstrations to oblige the allied troops to display their arrangements, and that when the 93rd showed their line upon the hill, the object was gained, and the cavalry withdrew."

The Times correspondent, William H. Russell, wrote that he could see nothing between the charging Russians and the British regiment's base of operations at Balaklava but the "thin red streak tipped with a line of steel" of the 93rd; in his later accounts, he changed the phrase to "thin red line".

The battle is represented in Robert Gibb's 1881 oil painting The Thin Red Line, which is displayed in the Scottish National War Museum in Edinburgh Castle. It is also commemorated in the assembly hall of Campbell's former school, High School of Glasgow, where there is a painting of the action hung in the grand position, a tribute to one of the school's two generals, the other being Sir John Moore, who was killed at Corunna during the Peninsular War.

== Later uses of the term ==
The Thin Red Line has become an English language figure of speech for any thinly spread military unit holding firm against attack. The phrase has also taken on the metaphorical meaning of the barrier which the relatively limited armed forces of a country present to potential attackers.

The term "the thin red line" later referred to the Argyll and Sutherland Highlanders and their job to defend the British Empire and the United Kingdom after the incorporation of the Argylls and Sutherlands into a single regiment now known as the Argyll and Sutherland battalion of the Royal Regiment of Scotland.

Rudyard Kipling wrote in the poem "Tommy": "Then it's Tommy this, an' Tommy that, an' Tommy, 'ow's yer soul? / But it's 'Thin red line of 'eroes' when the drums begin to roll," – "Tommy Atkins" being slang for a common British soldier.

George MacDonald Fraser describes the Thin Red Line, the Charge of the Heavy Brigade, and the Charge of the Light Brigade in his novel Flashman at the Charge.

In the 1968 film Carry On... Up the Khyber, a soldier played by Charles Hawtrey draws a thin red line on the ground with paint and brush, arguing that the enemy will not dare to cross it.

The term was adopted as a reference to the fire brigade, via the derived "thin blue line" referring to police. Such uses are common in the US on bumper stickers expressing membership or support of police and fire departments.

James Jones wrote a novel about American infantry soldiers fighting in Guadalcanal during World War II and titled it The Thin Red Line. The book was adapted into feature films in 1964 and in 1998.

== Musical references ==
- The action was the origin of the now-traditional Scottish song, "A Scottish Soldier (The Green Hills of Tyrol)". "The Green Hills of Tyrol" is one of the best known tunes played by pipe bands today. It was originally from the opera William Tell by Rossini, but was transcribed to the pipes in 1854 by Pipe Major John MacLeod after he heard it played by a Sardinian military band when serving in the Crimean War with his regiment, the 93rd Sutherland Highlanders.
- Stanley Hawley composed a recitation accompanied by piano in 1896, with a libretto by Alice MacDonell. It was published by Bosworth.
- Kenneth Alford (also known as Major Fredrick Joseph Ricketts) wrote his march The Thin Red Line in 1908 (published in 1925) to commemorate the "thin red line".
- The battle is referenced by English metal band Saxon in the song "The Thin Red Line" on their 1997 album Unleash the Beast
- Canadian band Glass Tiger referenced the battle on their 1986 album The Thin Red Line.
- The band Steeleye Span references the term in their song "Fighting for Strangers" from the album Rocket Cottage.
- Van Halen`s "Unchained" references the term on their 1981 album Fair Warning.
- The band Big Audio Dynamite references the term in their song "Union, Jack" from the album Megatop Phoenix.
- Jason Isbell references the term in his song "Grown" from the album Sirens of the Ditch.
- The Dreadnoughts, a Canadian punk band, reference the term in the song "The Cruel Wars" on their album Uncle Touchy Goes to College.
- Forlorn Hope, a British melodic metal band references the term in their song "Redcoat".

== See also ==
- Charge of the Heavy Brigade
- Charge of the Light Brigade
- During the German Siege of Sevastopol in 1942, the 456th Rifle Regiment of the 109th Rifle Division defended the same ground.
