= The Thin Red Line (painting) =

1881 painting by Robert Gibb

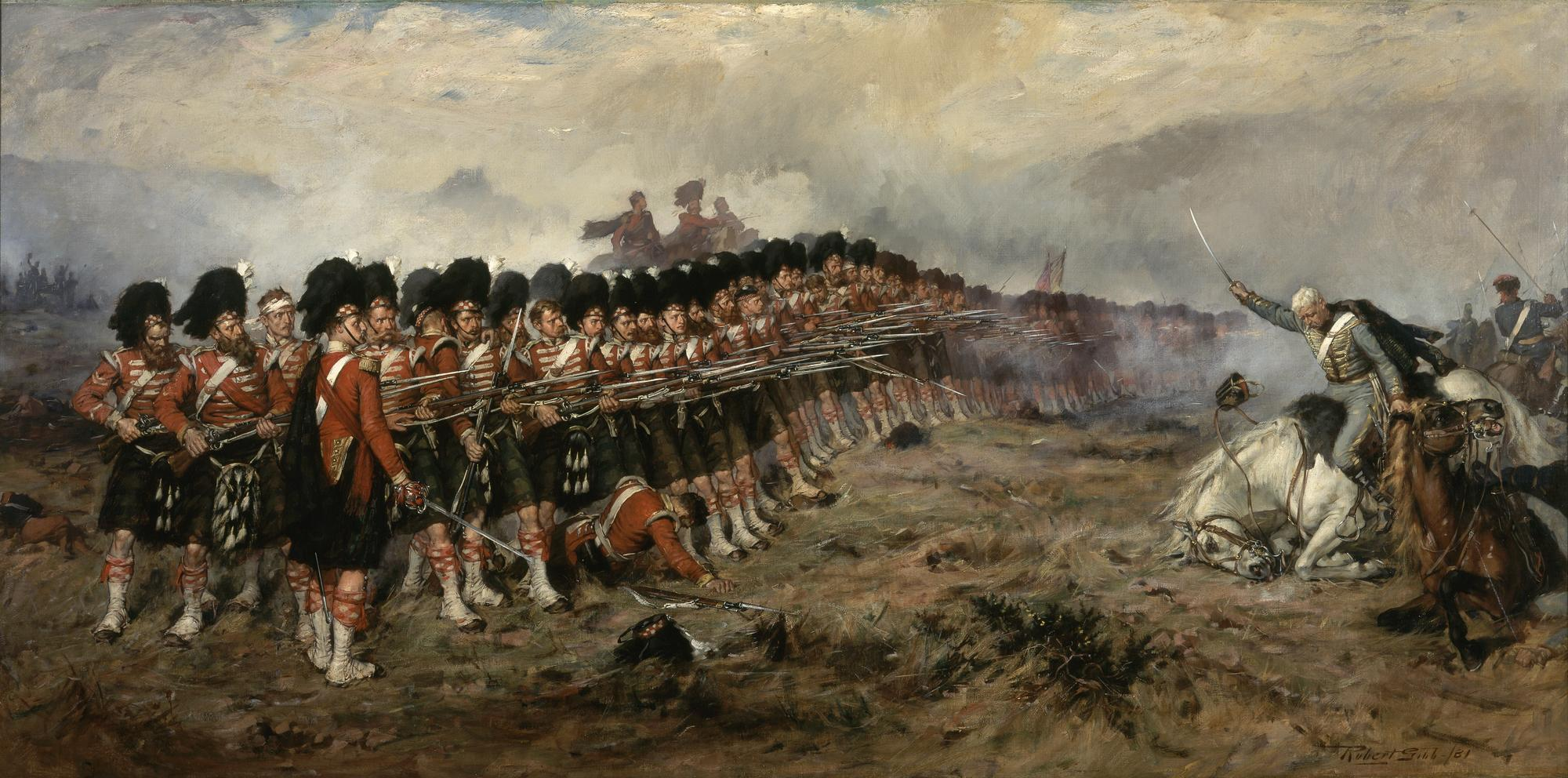
Robert Gibb, The Thin Red Line, 1881, National War Museum, Edinburgh

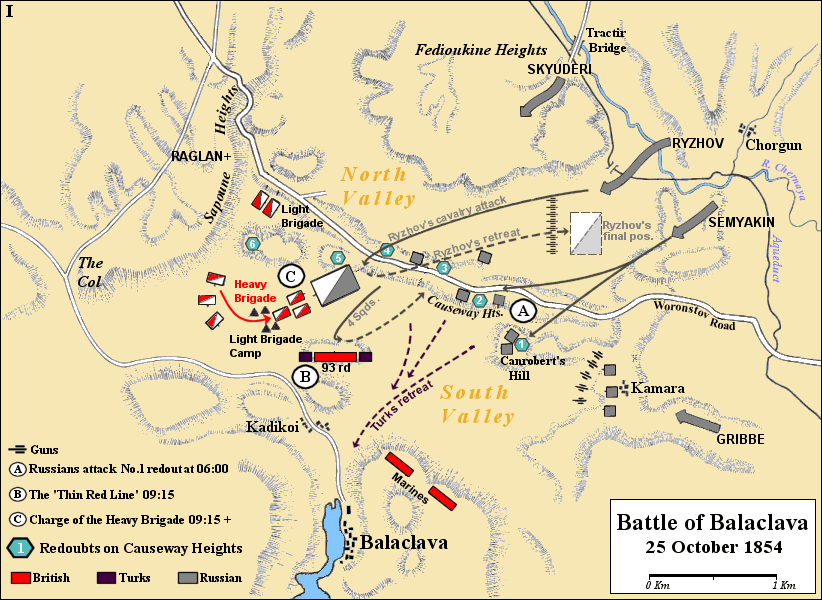
First stage of the Battle of Balaklava. Ryzhov's cavalry attacked over the Causeway Heights (with its line of redoubts marked "1" to "6") at approximately 09:15, and were met by the Sutherland Highlanders at the hill north of Kadikoi (marked "B").

The Thin Red Line is an 1881 oil-on-canvas painting by Robert Gibb depicting the 93rd (Sutherland Highlanders) Regiment of Foot at the Battle of Balaclava on 25 October 1854, during the Crimean War. In an incident which became known as "The Thin Red Line", a two-deep line of around 500 red-coated Scottish infantry from the Highland Brigade – with support from around 1,000 Royal Marines and Turkish infantry along with six guns of field artillery – stood firm against a force of around 2,500 Russian cavalrymen. The incident was a small one, in the context of the battle and the war as a whole, but became the focus for celebrating the stoicism and steadfastness of the British Army after Gibb's painting was exhibited.

== Background ==
The Russians were moving to attack the British base of operations at the port of Balaclava. After the Russians captured defensive redoubts on the Causeway Heights to the north of Balaklava from around 6am on 25 October, about 2,500 Russian cavalry commanded by Lieutenant General Ivan Ivanovich Ryzhov were sent to probe forwards at around 9 am. The small force of British and Turkish infantry was the last line of defence before Balaklava, but was sheltering from Russian artillery fire behind a hill north of Kadikoi, about 1 mile (1.6 km) north of Balaclava.

The infantry moved to defend the top of the hill, and around 400 of the cavalry, possibly four squadrons of the 12th Ingermanland Hussars, were ordered to charge them. The Turkish infantry fired one ineffective long-distance volley and retreated, but the British infantry remained in place. Their commander Sir Colin Campbell decided against forming his six companies of Highlanders into square, the usual defensive tactic, or even a more robust formation of four ranks: instead, the vulnerable line of infantry fixed bayonets and fired several volleys with their rifles. The body of cavalry split into two, swerved aside, and withdrew.

The war correspondent of The Times, William H. Russell, observed the scene, later describing the Russian cavalry as charging at a "thin red streak tipped with a line of steel", which later became known as "the thin red line".

Thinking that an unsupported line of infantry could not hold back a cavalry charge, General Ryzhov assumed there was a stronger force out of sight behind the line of Highlanders, and the remainder of its cavalry held its position. Within a few minutes, the Russians were forced to retreat after the Charge of the Heavy Brigade. The Highlanders remained in their defensive position until the battle concluded a few hours later, after the disastrous Charge of the Light Brigade.

== Painting ==
The painting was inspired by Gibb's reading of Alexander Kinglake's book The Invasion of the Crimea. It shows the blue-coated Russian cavalry within a few yards of the red-coated British infantry, much closer than was actually the case in the battle: in reality, the cavalry came no closer than 100–200 yards (91–183 m). Gibbs obtained a Highlander's uniform to ensure the accuracy of his depiction, from the feather bonnets to the kilts and sporrans (including the large badger head sporran worn by the bearded sergeant at the right end of the line). The painting was one of three by Gibb on Crimean War themes, the others depicting incidents from the Battle of Alma (Alma: Advance of the 42nd Highlanders, 1889) and the Battle of Inkerman (Saving the Colours; the Guards at Inkerman, 1895).

The painting was first exhibited in Edinburgh, at the Royal Scottish Academy on Princes Street. The painting was on loan from owners Diageo to the Scottish National War Museum in Edinburgh Castle from 2000 until 2016, after which it was donated to the national collection.
