= William Gibb (artist) =

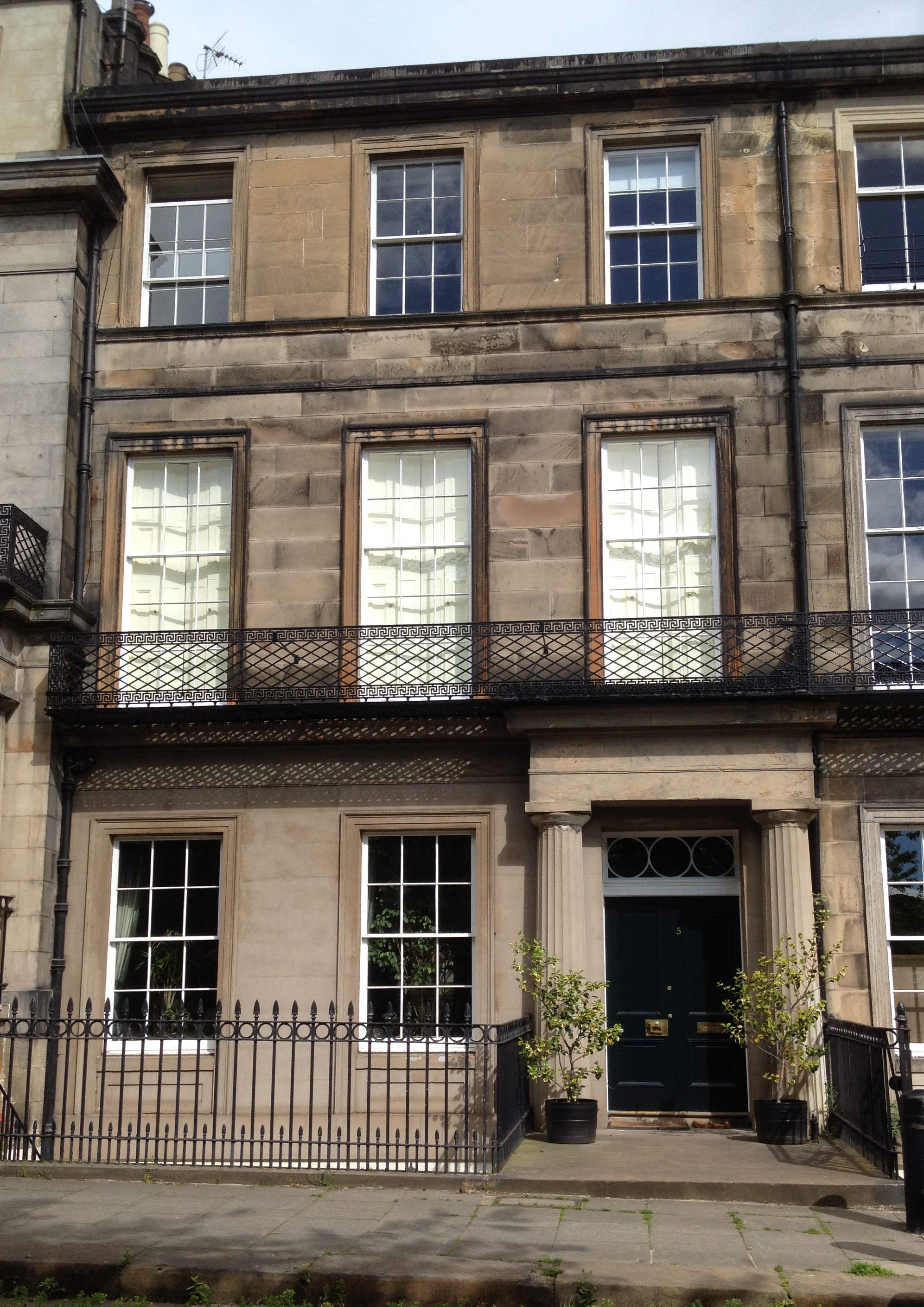
5 Regent Terrace, Edinburgh

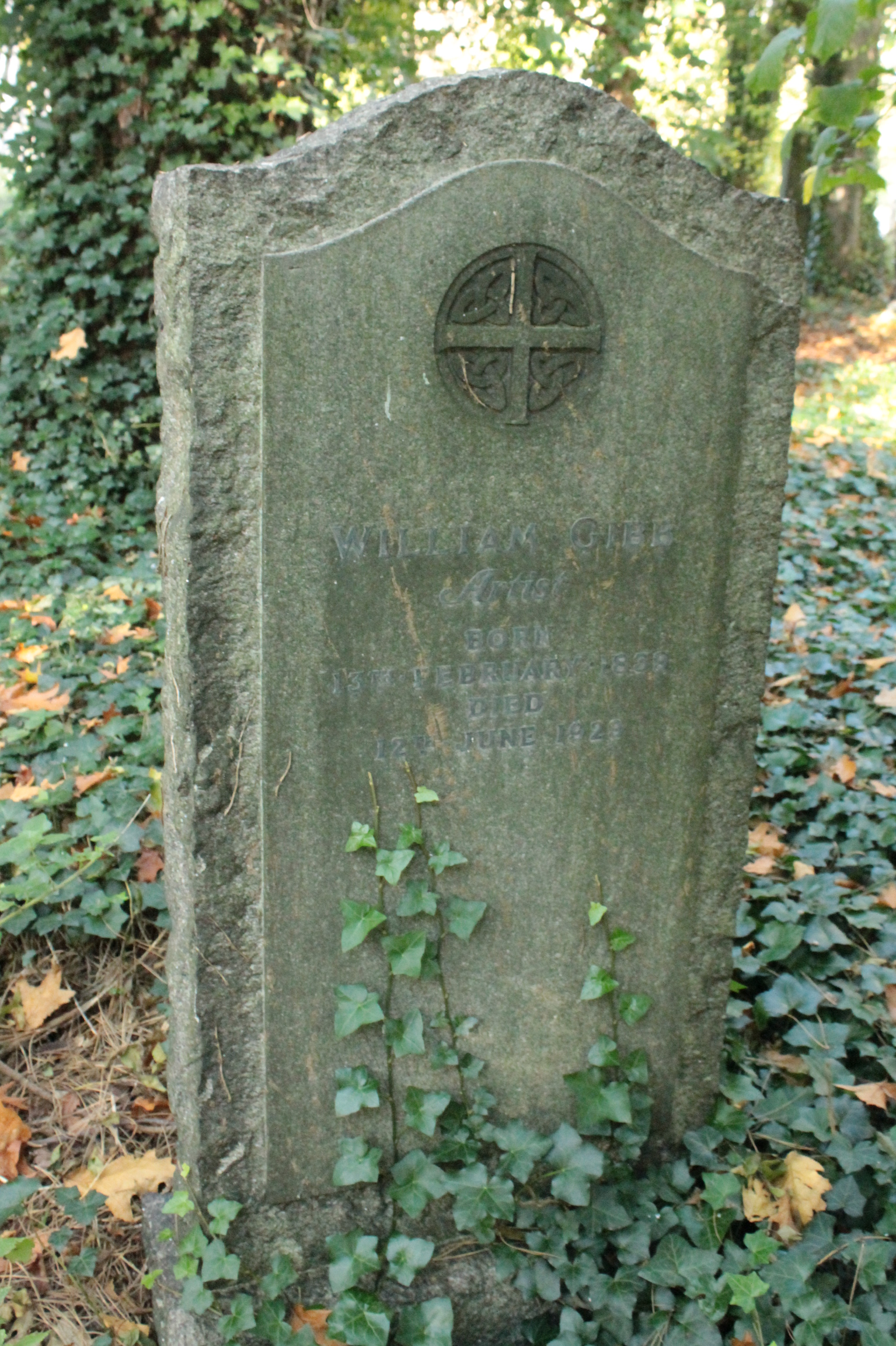
The Gibb grave, Warriston Cemetery

William Gibb (1839–1929) was a 19th/20th century Scottish landscape artist, book illustrator and lithographer. He was elder brother to the artist Robert Gibb.

== Life ==
He was born on 13 February 1839 in a cottage on James Street in Laurieston near Falkirk, south-east of Stirling in central Scotland, the son of Alexander Gibb, a builder. and his wife, Christian Morrison.

The family moved to Edinburgh around 1844, living at 28 Greenside Street. In 1855, they moved to an impressive Georgian townhouse: 5 Regent Terrace on Calton Hill.

Showing an artistic talent he was sent to train under Robert Scott Lauder. He was then sent to London to learn lithography with "Day & Son". In London he met John Phillip who helped develop his style. However, Gibb lacked confidence in his own skills and remained firmly of the belief that he should only pursue commissioned works, rather than risk speculative work. These commissions often linked to entire series to illustrate a reference book.

His clients included Sir David Cameron and Sir John Reid. He specialised in creating lithographs of whole collections of relics, artefacts etc. and was in demand as an accurate draughtsman. His works are found in most British galleries and museums and in the homes of many of the landed gentry.

He died on 12 June 1929. He is buried in Warriston Cemetery in north Edinburgh, slightly to the east of his mentor Robert Scott Lauder off the westmost path. Having no other family the grave was presumably purchased (and stone erected) by his brother, Robert Gibb, who died three years later.

== Family ==
Gibb is thought to have been unmarried.

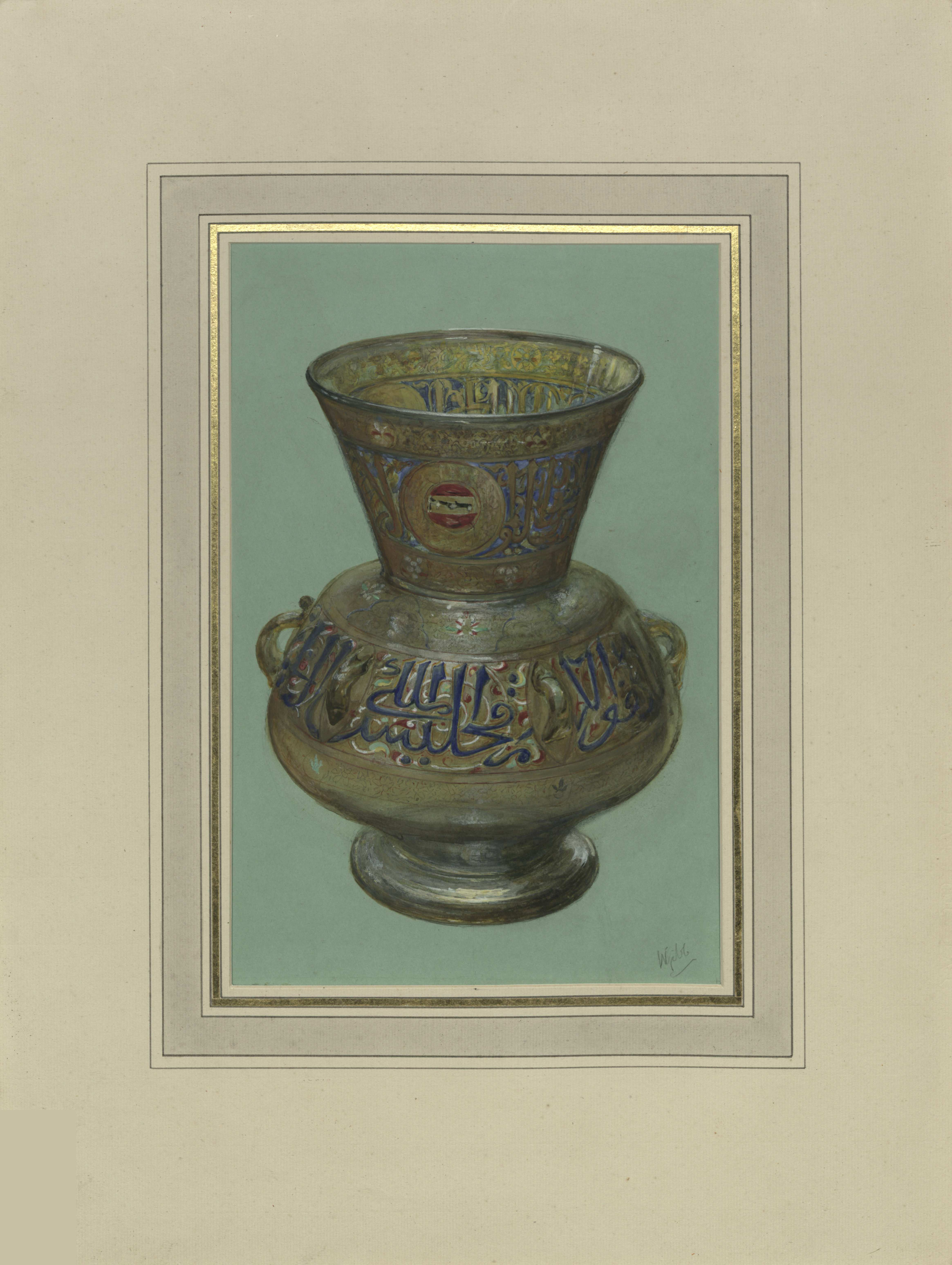
Moorish Lamp, Aberdeen Archives, Gallery & Museums Collection

== Notable series ==
- The Abbotsford Relics of Sir Walter Scott
- The Relics of the Royal House of Stuart
- Musical Instruments - Historic, Rare and Unique
- Naval and Military Trophies and Personal Relics of British Heroes
