= National War Museum =

Museum in Edinburgh, Scotland

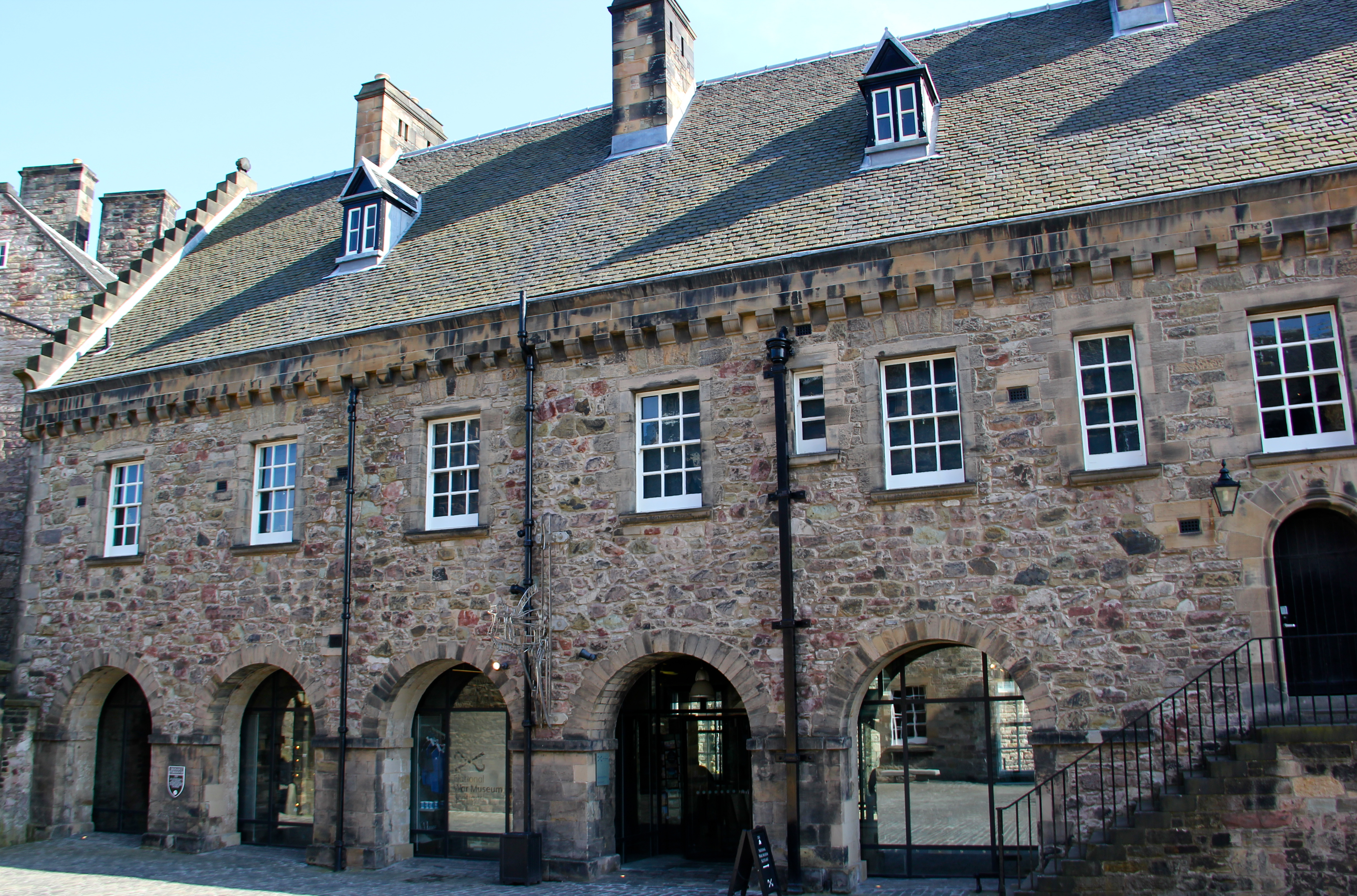
- Coordinates: 55°56′55.5″N 03°12′05.7″W
- Visitors: 830,699 (2025)
- Website: www.nms.ac.uk/war

The National War Museum is a museum dedicated to warfare, which is located inside Edinburgh Castle in Edinburgh, Scotland. Opened in 1933 in a converted 18th-century ordnance storehouse, the museum is run by National Museums Scotland and covers 400 years of Scotland at war from the 17th century through permanent exhibits and special exhibitions.

It was formerly known as the Scottish United Services Museum, and prior to this, the Scottish Naval and Military Museum.

== Location and description ==
The museum is located in the Hospital Square of Edinburgh Castle, within the Old Town area of Edinburgh, Scotland. The building, which has been category-B listed since 1970, comprises two storeys with a ten-bay rectangular-plan. It is managed by National Museums Scotland. Admission to the museum is included in the entry charge for the castle.

The museum's collection includes items used by Scotland's armed forces over many centuries. These include broadswords from the Scottish Highlands, protection against chemical warfare, and letters sent home from combat by personnel. It also houses a gallery, with works such as The Thin Red Line by Robert Gibb, and a library.

== History ==
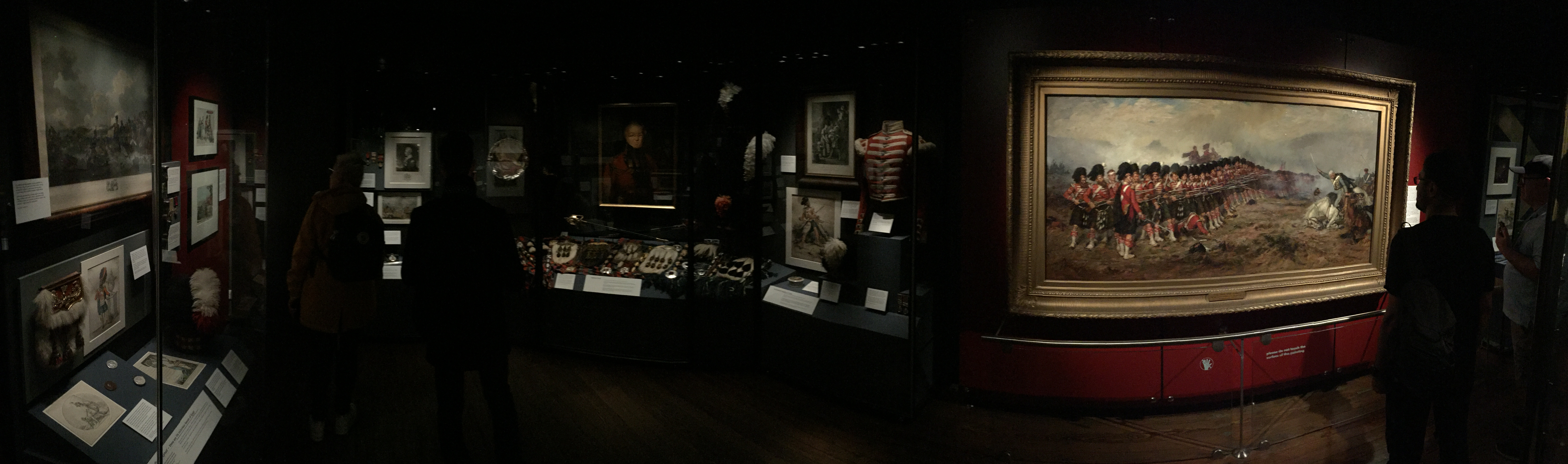
Interior of the museum

Various movements proposing museums dedicated to warfare arose during World War I, and the consensus amongst those involved was that they should be regional in nature. Preliminary ideas for a Scottish museum were drawn up in 1917 by Alexander Ormiston Curle, curator of the National Museum of Scotland, under advice from organisers in London, as well as a civic committee of the Edinburgh council, set up by Lord Provost John Lorne MacLeod. John Stewart-Murray, 8th Duke of Atholl, was also a supporter of the idea. The committee worked through 1918 and 1919 on ideas for the museum, including plans for procuring exhibits. After the end of the war, however, priority was given to the construction of the Scottish National War Memorial, which opened in 1927, and the museum project was put on hold.

The museum project was resurrected in the late 1920s by the Duke of Atholl, utilising a building inside Edinburgh Castle which was built in the 1748 by William Skinner as a storehouse for ordnance. Construction took more than three years, and the museum was opened by Lord High Commissioner John Buchan on 23 May 1933 as the Scottish Naval and Military Museum.

In 1949, recognising the importance of the Air Force to the war effort in World War II, the museum was renamed to the United Services Museum. The museum was refurbished in 2000, and upon reopening was renamed to its present name of the National War Museum.

== See also ==
- Scottish National War Memorial
