= Robert Gibb (painter) =

Scottish painter (1845–1932)

Coordinates: 56.000°N 2.514°W

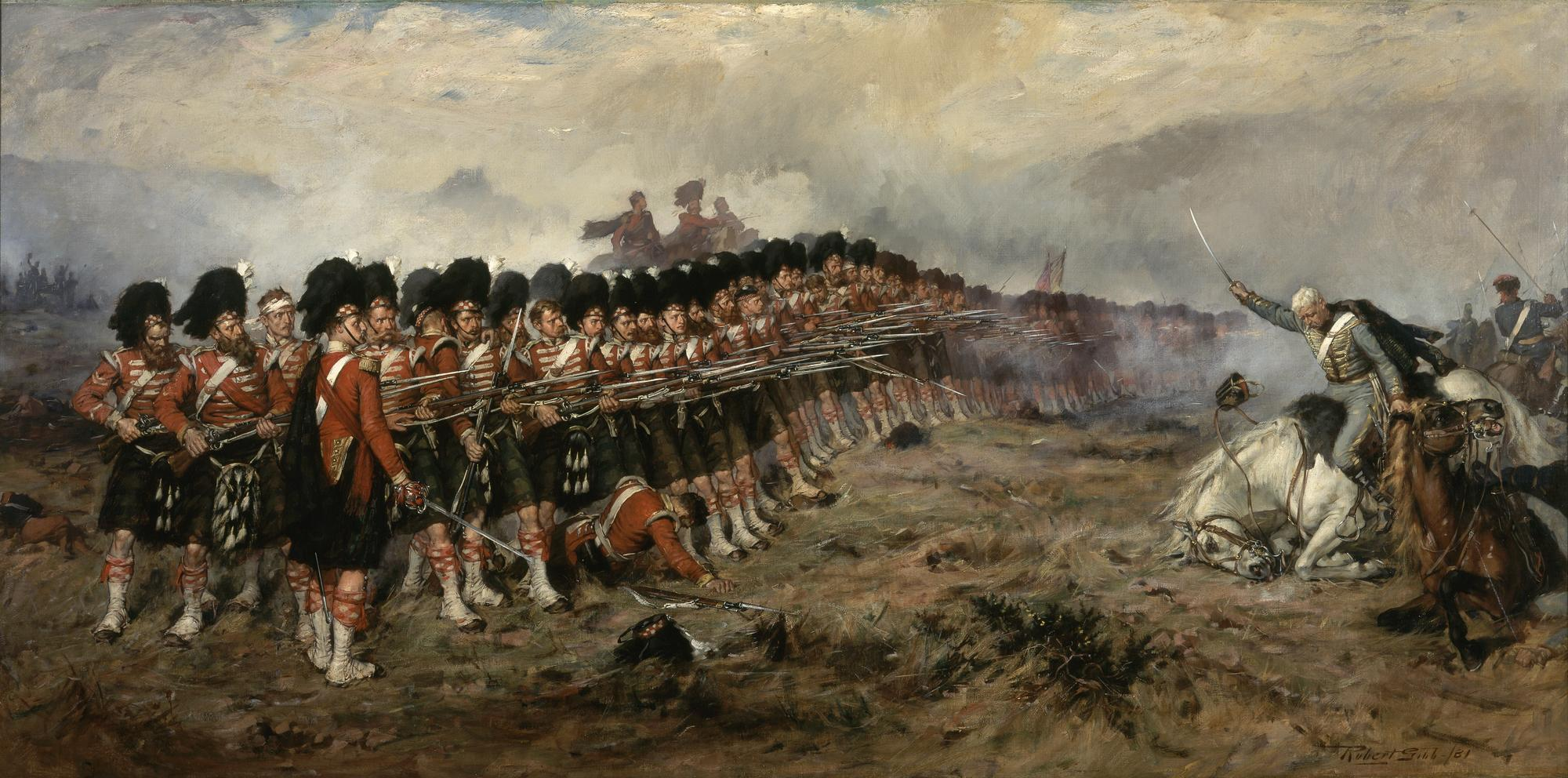
The Thin Red Line, 1881

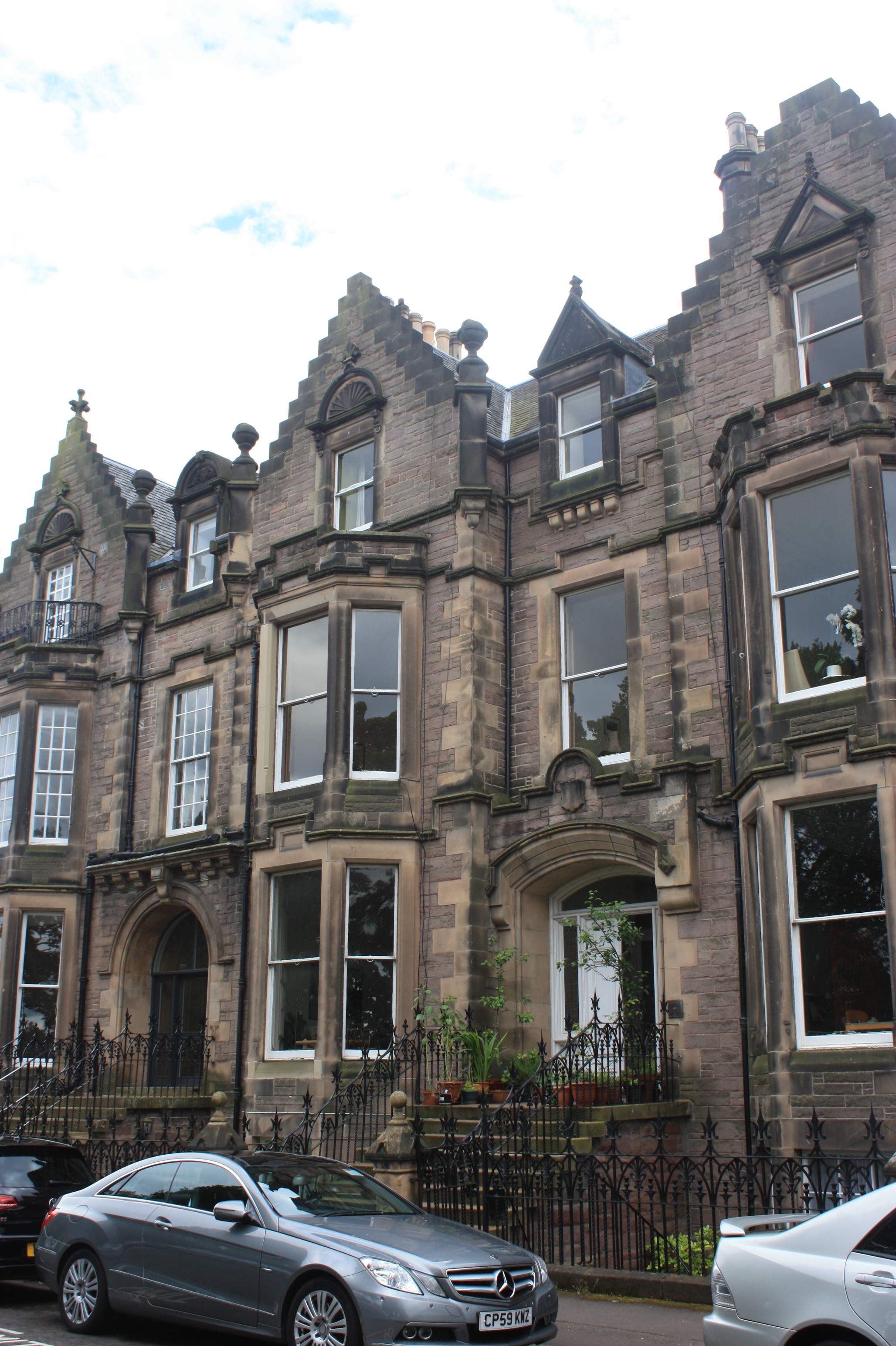
Gibb's home at 2 Bruntsfield Crescent, Edinburgh

Robert Gibb RSA (28 October 1845 – 11 February 1932) was a Scottish painter. He was Keeper of the National Gallery of Scotland from 1895 to 1907 and was Painter and Limner to the King from 1908 until his death. He built his reputation on romantic, historical and particularly military paintings but was also a significant portrait artist.

== Life ==
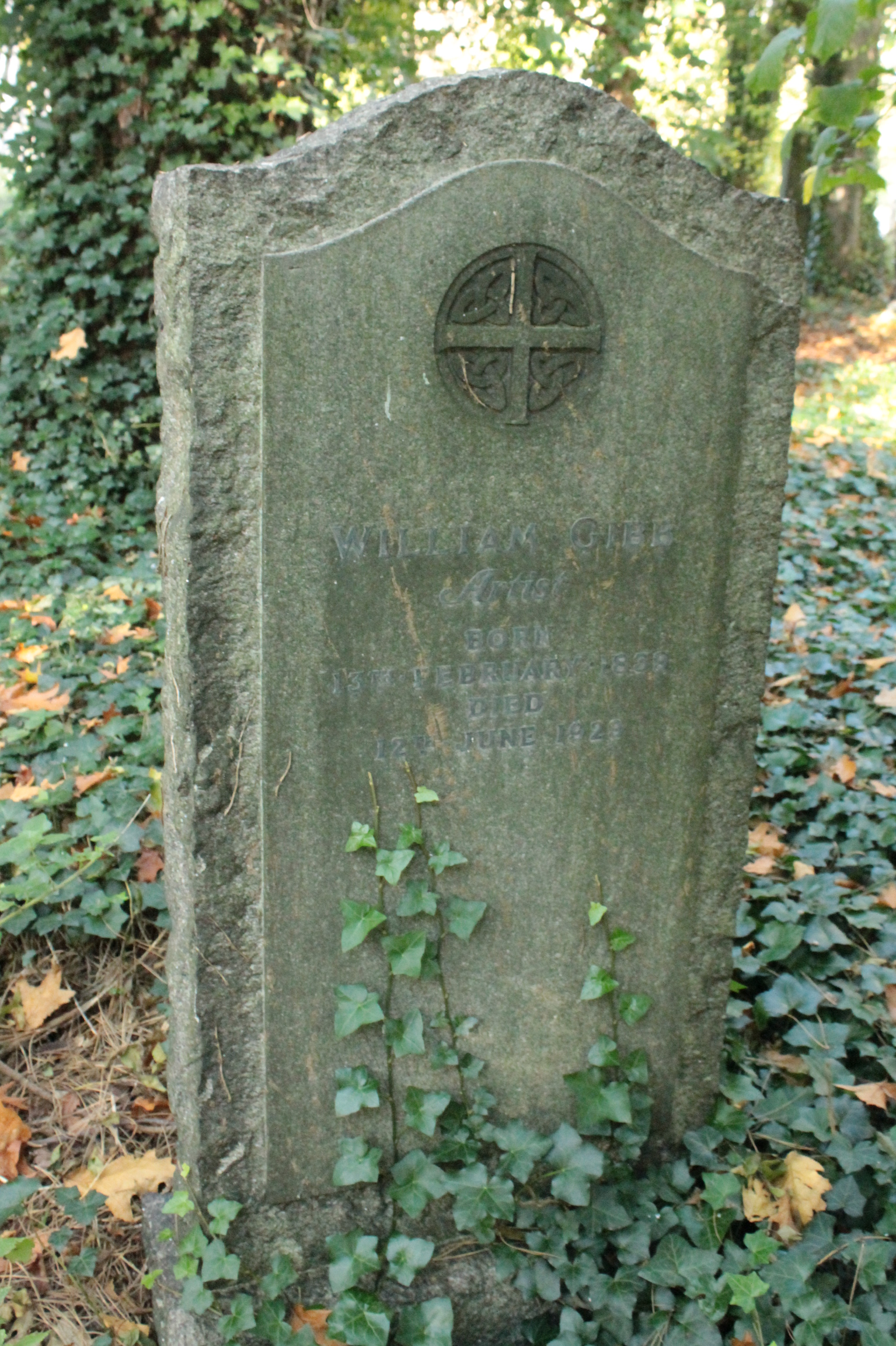
The Gibb grave, Warriston Cemetery

Gibb was born at 28 Greenside Street in Edinburgh, the son of Alexander Gibb, a builder. His older brother was the artist William Gibb. The family moved to 5 Regent Terrace on Calton Hill in 1855. The family moved again to Mayfield Terrace in the south of the city when Robert was a teenager.

Gibb studied art at evening classes at the Board of Manufacturers in Edinburgh and at the life school of the Royal Scottish Academy (RSA). He began exhibiting at the RSA in 1867 showing an Arran landscape; this would be the first of no fewer than 143 paintings exhibited at the academy. By the end of the next decade, he had begun to establish his reputation as a painter of battles. Following Comrades, his first foray into the military genre, he was elected an Associate of the Royal Scottish Academy. The theme of this painting, a group of three soldiers, one of whom has fallen in the snow, was taken from his painting showing the retreat from Moscow which was shown the following year. He was made a full member following the enormous success of his 1881 painting The Thin Red Line which was inspired by his reading of Alexander William Kinglake's book The Invasion of Crimea. Three years later came Schoolmates, depicting two highland officers in the heat of battle, one falling wounded into the arms of the other.

In 1895, he was appointed Principal Curator of the National Gallery of Scotland, following the death of Gourlay Steell, and served in this role until 1907.

He continued painting military scenes throughout the Great War, and his last military painting Backs to the Wall appeared in 1929.

Gibb was also sought after as a portrait painter. Among his subjects were Henry Morton Stanley, Rev. Joseph Parker, D.D., and Sir Arthur Halkett, Bart. He also painted his wife, the former Margaret Shennan, second daughter of the Lord Dean of the Guild, whom he married in 1885.

The artist died at his residence at 2 Bruntsfield Crescent, Edinburgh in 1932. He was given a full military funeral with honour guard in Warriston Cemetery on 15 February. Although some claim his grave lies on a path edge south of the vaults (with no gravestone), this does not make complete sense as the family already had a burial plot in a south-west section (around 30m south of the alleged site). This was the burial place of his brother William in 1929. The lack of inscription to Robert is explained by his lack of family at the time of death.

== Paintings ==
- Head of Glen-Lester, Arran (1867)
- Visit of William, Lord Russell's Family before his Execution (1872)
- Death of Marmion (1873)
- Columbia in sight of Iona (1874)
- Elaine (1875)
- Margaret of Anjou and the Outlaw (1875)
- Death of St Columba (1876)
- Bridge of Sighs (1877)
- Comrades (1878 - Private Collection)
- Retreat from Moscow (1879 - Private Collection)
- The Thin Red Line, (1881 - National War Museum, Edinburgh)
- Last Voyage of the Viking, 1883)
- The Sea King (1883)
- Schoolmates (1884 - Private Collection)
- Letters from Home (1885 - destroyed)
- Alma: Advance of the 42nd Highlanders (1889 - Kelvingrove Art Gallery and Museum, Glasgow)
- Saving the Colours; the Guards at Inkerman (1895 - Naval and Military Club, London)
- Comrades (1878 - Private Collection)
- Comrades (1896 - Black Watch)
- Hougomont-1815 (1903 - National War Museum, Edinburgh)
- Dargai, October 20, 1897 (1909 - Private Collection)
- The Red Cross (1913)
- Communion at the Front (1917)
- Backs to the Wall, 1918 (1929 - Arbroath Museum)

=== Works about ===
- Gilbert, W. Matthews, "Robert Gibb, R.S.A.", Art Journal 1897, pp. 25–28.
- Harrington, Peter. (1993). - British Artists and War: The Face of Battle in Paintings and Prints, 1700-1914. - London: Greenhill. - ISBN 1-85367-157-6
- Harrington, Peter, "The Man who Painted the Thin Red Line", Scots Magazine, Volume 130, No, 6, March 1989, pp. 587–595.
- Obituary, Times, 13 February 1932, p. 12.
