= Fruit and Flowers =

Photograph by Roger Fenton

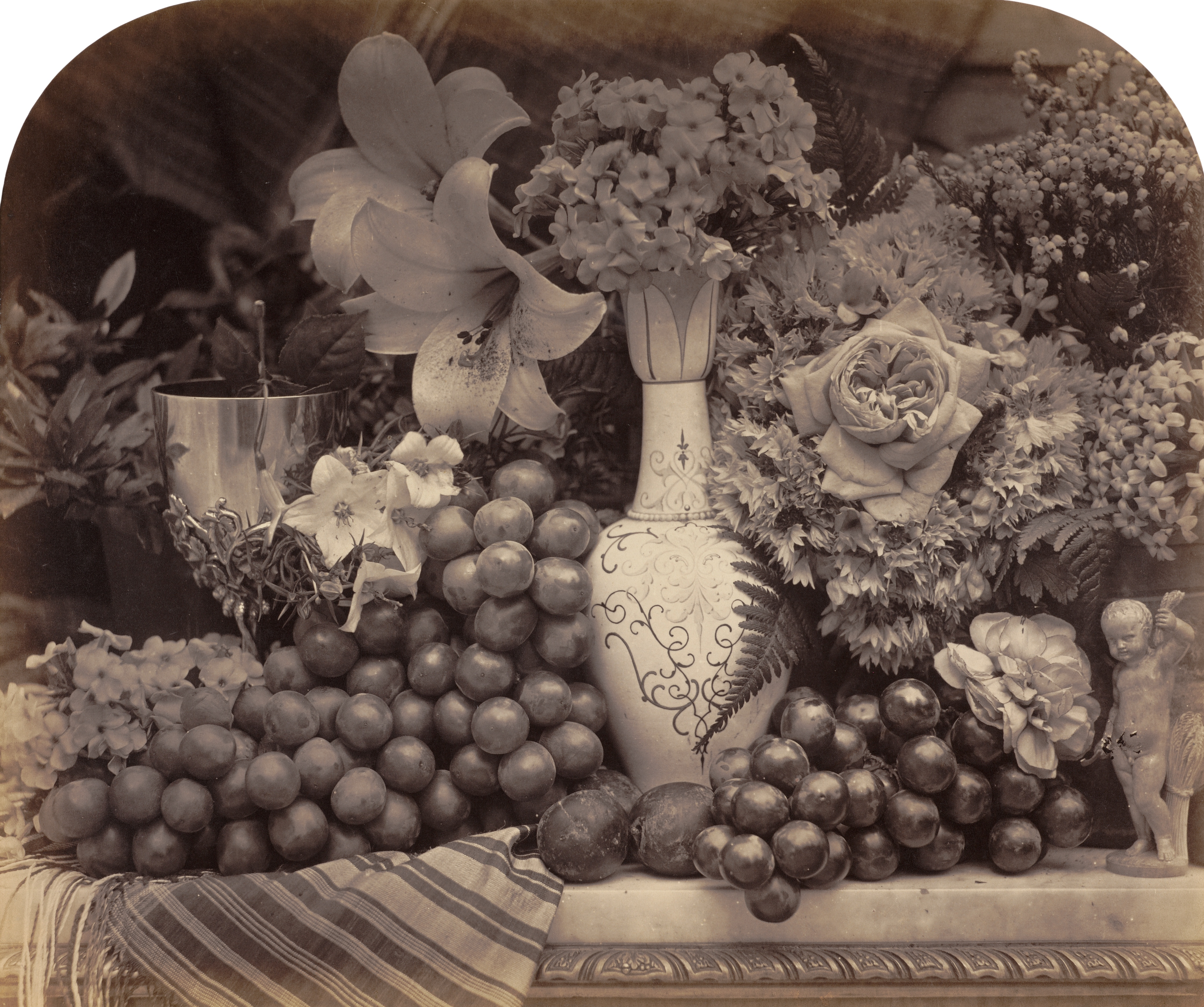
Fruit and Flowers (1860) by Roger Fenton

Fruit and Flowers is a black and white photograph by English photographer Roger Fenton, taken in 1860. It was part of the still lives series that Fenton did at the Summer of that year, and would be some of his final photographic work, shortly before be leave this activity, in 1862.

== History and description ==
Fenton faced bad weather in the Spring and Summer of 1860, and this might have inspired him to create a new kind of photography. He seems to have been inspired particularly by the still life, a typical subject in painting, to create a similar work in photography, even if it had to be monochrome. Fenton had previously worked in photographing the British Museum collection, and used his perfected skills to capture several carefully arranged still-lives, comprising groups of flowers, fruits, statuettes and other objects. His photographic still lives are believed to have been the first in English art.

This Fruit and Flowers is one of the finest that he arranged and photographed back then. Despite its pictorical inspiration, most likely from the Dutch painting, Fenton achieved something new in the history of art, justifying his belief that photography should also be considered an art form. This picture was shot in a close up, its space is densely filled, and the composition is set at the top of a marble table, decorated with fruits, flowers and some objects, upon a striped cloth. A vase with pansies, decorated with a tendril pattern, stands at the center of the composition. Several juicy grapes surround the vase, with some plums at his bottom. A silver goblet, at the left, reflects some hoyas, while two large lilies appear nearby. A rose is at the right side of the picture, while another one is seen below, between the grapes and a small nude cherubic figure. The largely filled still life also includes ferns and lilies.

== Reception ==
The National Gallery of Art website states that "The prominent roses and lilies may allude to the sacred, as both are associated with the Virgin Mary, but myriad wine references, such as the grapes, the chalice decorated with grape vines, and especially the impish figurine, whose physical attributes link him to bacchanalian Roman festivals, point decidedly to the profane. At the same time, the withering rose, drooping leaves, and tired-looking plums remind the viewer that such pleasures are ephemeral."

Helmut Gernsheim considers that "Roger Fenton photographs of fruits and flowers and game have a delicacy and textural quality equal to the finest seventeenth-century Dutch still-lives and flower paintings, and were deservedly honoured at the International Exhibition in London 1862."

== Public collections ==
There is a print of this photograph at the National Gallery of Art, in Washington, D.C. A very similar photograph, with a small figure at the left, is held at the Victoria and Albert Museum, in London.
