= Guido Alberto Rossi =

Italian photographer

- Born: August 15, 1949 (age 77); Milan, Italy
- Citizenship: Italian
- Education: Collegio San Carlo Milano Liceo Linguistico Internazionale
- Occupation: Photographer
- Website: guidoalbertorossi.com

Guido Alberto Rossi (born August 15, 1949) is an Italian photographer. He has worked in war photography, sports, travel, and aerial photography. His photographs have been published in most of the important magazines and in 38 photobooks.

== Biography ==
=== Early life and education ===
Rossi was born on August 15, 1949, in Milan, Italy. He attended Collegio San Carlo Milano from 1964 to 1965 and later studied at Liceo Linguistico Internazionale from 1965 to 1967, where he focused on languages.

=== Career ===
Rossi began his career as a photographer, with his first work published in Sport Illustrato in 1966, covering the Monza Formula 1 Grand Prix. In 1967, he became a war photographer, capturing conflicts in the Middle East, Africa, Cambodia, and Vietnam.

Later, he worked with sports and travel magazines. In 1977, he founded Action Press, and in 1978, he launched the Italian branch of The Image Bank (TIB) in Milan and Rome. In 2004, he founded TIPS Images & Film and continued his photography career. Later, Rossi focused on aerial photography, combining it with flying, logging 1,600 flight hours as a pilot.

Andy Warhol's famous NYC Statue of Liberty painting is an art version of one of his aerial images. His photos have appeared in Italian and international media. He has published 38 photobooks, including three self-published editions supporting the charity Il Pane Quotidiano in Milan.

In 2014, Rossi sold TIPS and started new projects. He joined Rotary Club Milano Nord and led the Migration Project (2016–2019), training 400 young Africans and developing an Italian language book and app. As part of Rotary Club Milano Villoresi, he was involved in two projects: a mobile dental clinic for the Italian Red Cross and Mare Nostrum, which removes lost fishing nets from Italian shores.

== Publications ==
Rossi writes photography articles for magazines and online journals, including papale-papale.it, ocean4future.org, and Fotografia.it. He also did photo books on different topics, including,

1. Motocross – De Agostini
2. Vent’anni a Colori – Diapress
3. Venice from the Air – Gallimard – Idea Libri- Bucher- Rizzoli
4. Rome from the Air - Gallimard – Idea Libri - Bucher- Rizzoli - Weidenfeld & Nicolson
5. Tuscany from the Air - Gallimard – Idea Libri -Thames & Hudson
6. Florence from the Air - Gallimard – Idea Libri – Bucher – Weidenfeld & Nicolson
7. Italy from the Air- Gallimard - The Vendome Press - Thames & Hudson
8. Vietnam – Flint River – Touring Club Italiano
9. Egypt - Flint River – Touring Club Italiano
10. Kenya- Flint River – Touring Club Italiano
11. Australia- Flint River – Touring Club Italiano - Philip Wilson Publishers
12. La Réunion Vue du ciel – Edition du Pacifique
13. La Martinique Vue du ciel – Edition du Pacifique
14. Guadeloupe Vue du ciel- Times Editions
15. Mauritius from the Air – Times Editions
16. Over Singapore – Archipelago Press
17. Italy from the Air – White Star – Grund - Lincoln Publishers
18. France from the Air – White Star – Grund - Lincoln Publishers
19. Indonesia from the Air – Gallimard -
20. Malaysia from the Air – Gallimard - Archipelago Press
21. Egypt from the Air- Abrams – Mondadori – Dumont - Thames & Hudson
22. Teatri D’Acqua- Nicolini Editore
23. Turkey an Aerial Portrait – Abrams
24. Basilicata vista dal Cielo – Mondadori Electa
25. Acqua vista dal Cielo – Touring Club Italiano – Chasse Marée – Gobierno de Aragon
26. Grèce vu du ciel – Gallimard
27. Umbria Sacra e Civile- Edizioni Rai

=== Books with another Photographer ===
1. L’archeologie vu du ciel & Yan Arthus Bertrand – Azan
2. USA- USA & Andrea Pistolesi - Touring Club Italiano
3. Europa- Europa & Andrea Pistolesi - Touring Club Italiano
4. Omaggio all’Italia & Andrea Pistolesi – Mondadori
5. Omaggio al Mediterraneo & Andrea Pistolesi – Mondadori
6. Terres D’Europe vu du Ciel & Daniel Philippe – Editions Terres D’Images

=== Produced for Charity ===
1. Foto & Parole- Italian Red Cross / Rotary Club Milano Nord
2. Foto, Diritti & Doveri - Italian Red Cross / Rotary Club Milano Nord
3. È Solo un Clic – Pane Quotidiano Milano
4. Foto e Bit - Pane Quotidiano Milano
5. Libro - Pane Quotidiano Milano
