= Pasha and Bayadère =

Photograph by Roger Fenton

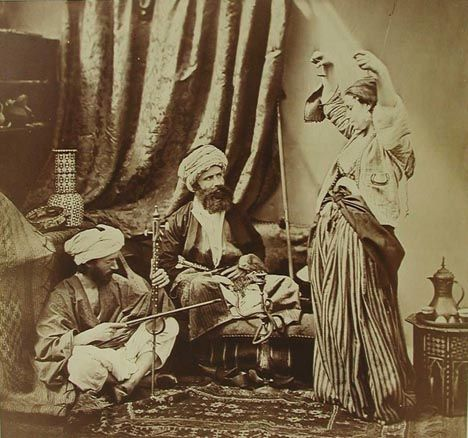
Pasha and Bayadère (1858) by Roger Fenton

Pasha and Bayadère is a black and white photograph by English photographer Roger Fenton, taken in 1858. It belongs to a group of pictures where Fenton staged scenes inspired by the Middle East exoticism and also by the artistic movement of orientalism.

== History and description ==
Fenton had taken a trip to Crimea in 1854, to document the Crimean War, and he also visited Constantinople at the time. He shared a particular interest, typical of his time, with the exoticism of the Middle East, in particular of the Ottoman Empire. While back at England, he decided to recreate some of these exotic scenes and took about 50 photographs of orientalist inspiration in the Summer of 1858.

This scene was staged in Fenton's studio in London and the photographer himself appears as the pasha of the title, a leading Turkish official, while his friend, the landscape painter Frank Dillon, stars as a musician who plays a string instrument at the left. A model portrays the exotic female dancer, the bayadère of the French title. The two men are seated, the pasha in a pillow, in a higher place than the musician, and they both wear exotic clothing in accordance with their different status. The pasha looks with interest at the dancer, while the musician plays, looking at his spiked fiddle. The dancer stands still, dressed in a Turkish inspired exotic outfit, including female pants, with her arms held up high, as she had been caught in the middle of a dance. However a closer inspection notices that her arms are both held by strings attached to her wrists. The time required for the photographs exposure explains this detail.

The interior shows a drape at the background, and is decorated with several exotic objects, including, at the left, a drum called "darabukke" and a tambourine, which had been allegedly taken by Dillon to England after a travel to Egypt, shortly before the picture was taken. Some of the same objects and the female model also appear in other similar pictures staged by Fenton.

Fenton presented these pictures as actually having been taken in the Middle East, and viewers often believe them to be genuine, despite being pastiches. A reviewer from 1858 stated: "[These] are favourable examples, being admirable illustrations of Eastern scenes of actual life."

== Reception ==
The photograph was the subject of a book by Gordon Baldwin, Roger Fenton: Pasha and Bayadere, published by the Getty Museum Studies on Art (1996).

== Public and private collections ==
There are two known prints of this photograph, held at the J. Paul Getty Museum, in Los Angeles, and at the National Science and Media Museum in Bradford.
