= L'Entente Cordiale (photograph) =

Photograph by Roger Fenton

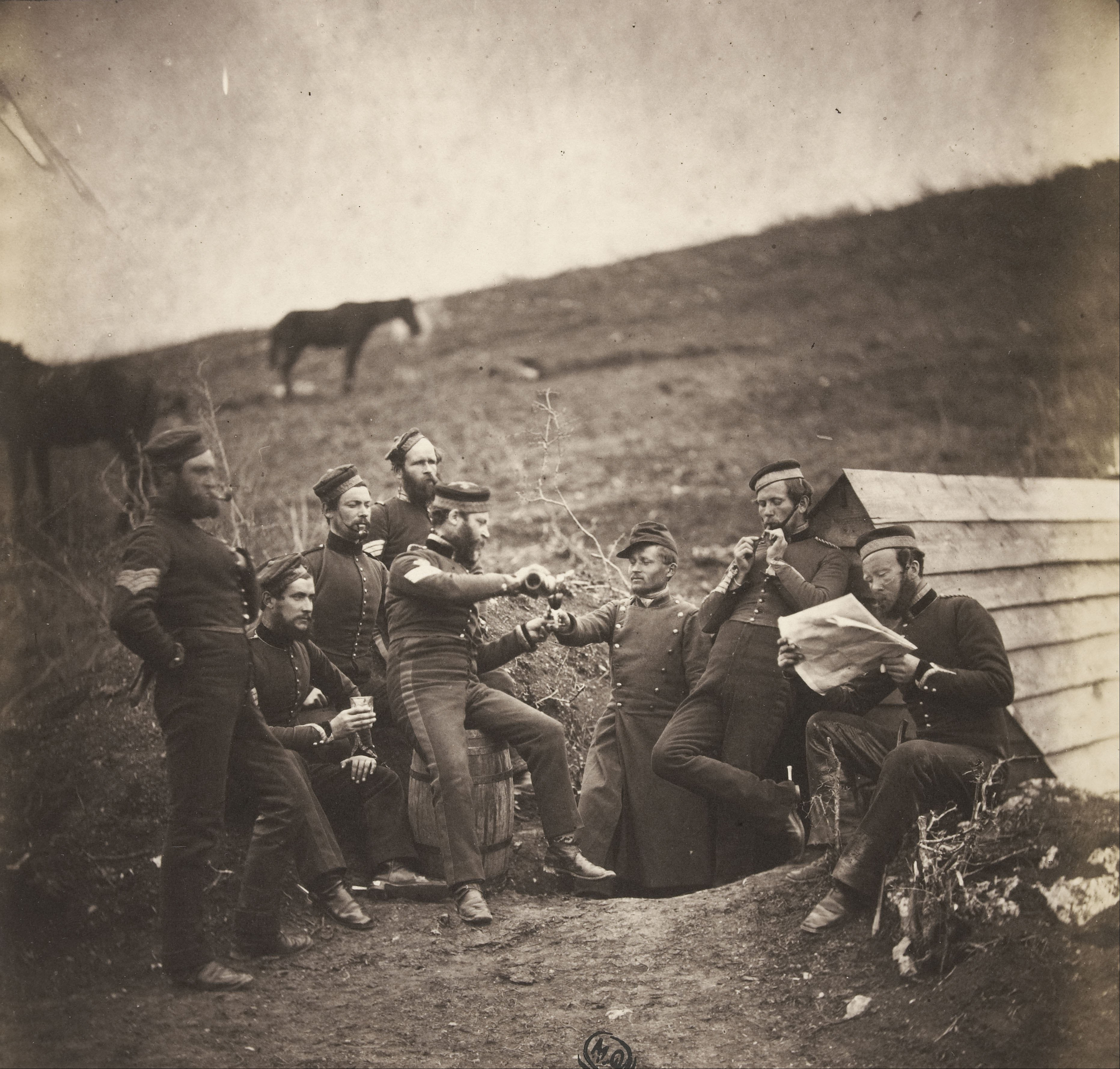
'L'Entente Cordiale (1855) by Roger Fenton

L'Entente Cordiale is a black-and-white photograph by English photographer Roger Fenton, taken in 1855. The picture was part of the large number taken by Fenton during the Crimean War, where he was one of the first war photographers.

== History and description ==
The Crimean War started in October 1853 between Russia and the Ottoman Empire, which was joined the following year by France and the United Kingdom. The British public had developed a negative view of the war, so Queen Victoria invited Fenton to document the war with his photographic work, to give a more favourable view of the conflict. Fenton arrived in Balaklava, Crimea, and moved to Sevastopol, in March 1855, to document the ongoing siege. The English photographer attempted to portray the conflict in a positive way, and took pictures of members of the allied armies, both soldiers and officers, of local landscapes and also of the scenes of the battlefields, often deserted.

The scenes depicting soldiers are often staged, like the current one, which depicts the confraternization between British and French soldiers. They aren't easily distinguishable, because their uniforms are similar. Eight members of both armies are seen together in a leisure occasion. They all pose for the photographer, some are standing or seated, the soldier at the center of the composition, seated on a wooden barrel, fills the glass of another one at his right. Others smoke pipes and the one seated at the right reads a newspaper. A hut is visible behind him, while two horses are seen in the hillside pasture, which serves as background of the scene.

The artificiality of the scene doesn't detract from the real comradeship often experienced by soldiers of both armies during the war. The National Army Museum website states that "In fact, the friendly atmosphere it portrays seems to have matched reality. There were many instances of British and French soldiers enjoying time together and, by the time the photograph was taken, the bitter Crimean winter was long past and much had been done to improve conditions at the front."

== Public collections ==
There are prints of this photograph at The Royal Collection, the National Army Museum, in London, the Musée d'Orsay, in Paris, the Art Institute of Chicago, the J. Paul Getty Museum, in Los Angeles, the San Francisco Museum of Modern Art, and the National Gallery of Canada, in Ottawa.
