= Valley of the Shadow of Death (Roger Fenton) =

1855 photograph by Roger Fenton

Coordinates: 44.583°N 33.54°E

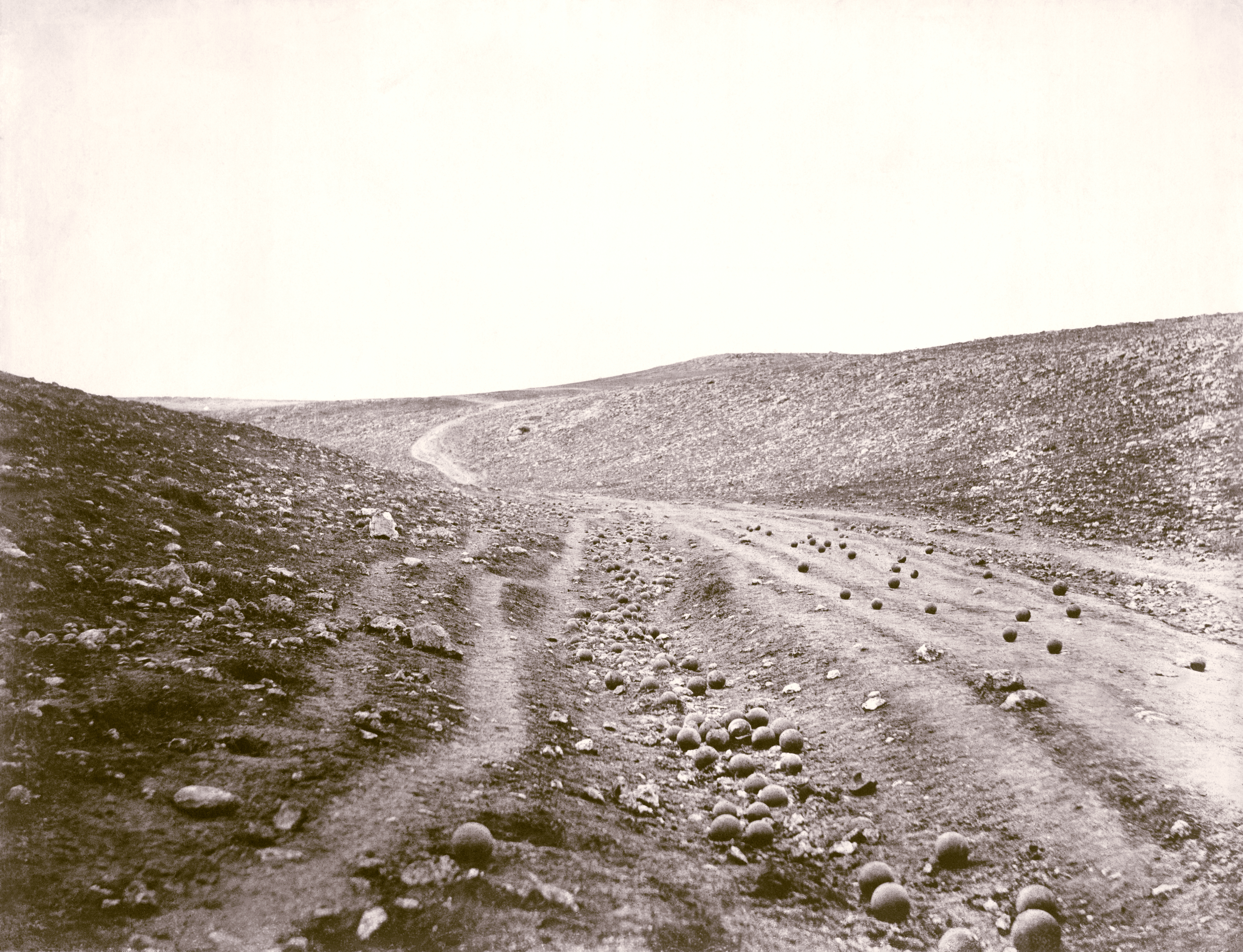
Valley of the Shadow of Death

Valley of the Shadow of Death is an albumen print photograph by Roger Fenton, taken on April 23, 1855, during the Crimean War. It is one of the most well-known images of war. The photo is one of 360 taken by Fenton of the war.

== Background ==
Roger Fenton was sent by Thomas Agnew of Agnew & Sons to record the Crimean War, where the United Kingdom, the Second French Empire, the Kingdom of Sardinia, and the Ottoman Empire were fighting a war against the Russian Empire. The place of the picture was named by British soldiers The Valley of Death because it was under constant shelling there. When in September 1855 Thomas Agnew put the picture on show, as one of a series of eleven collectively titled Panorama of the Plateau of Sebastopol in Eleven Parts in a London exhibition, he took the troops'—and Tennyson's—epithet and expanded it as Valley of the Shadow of Death with its deliberate evocation of Psalm 23.

== Possible staging ==
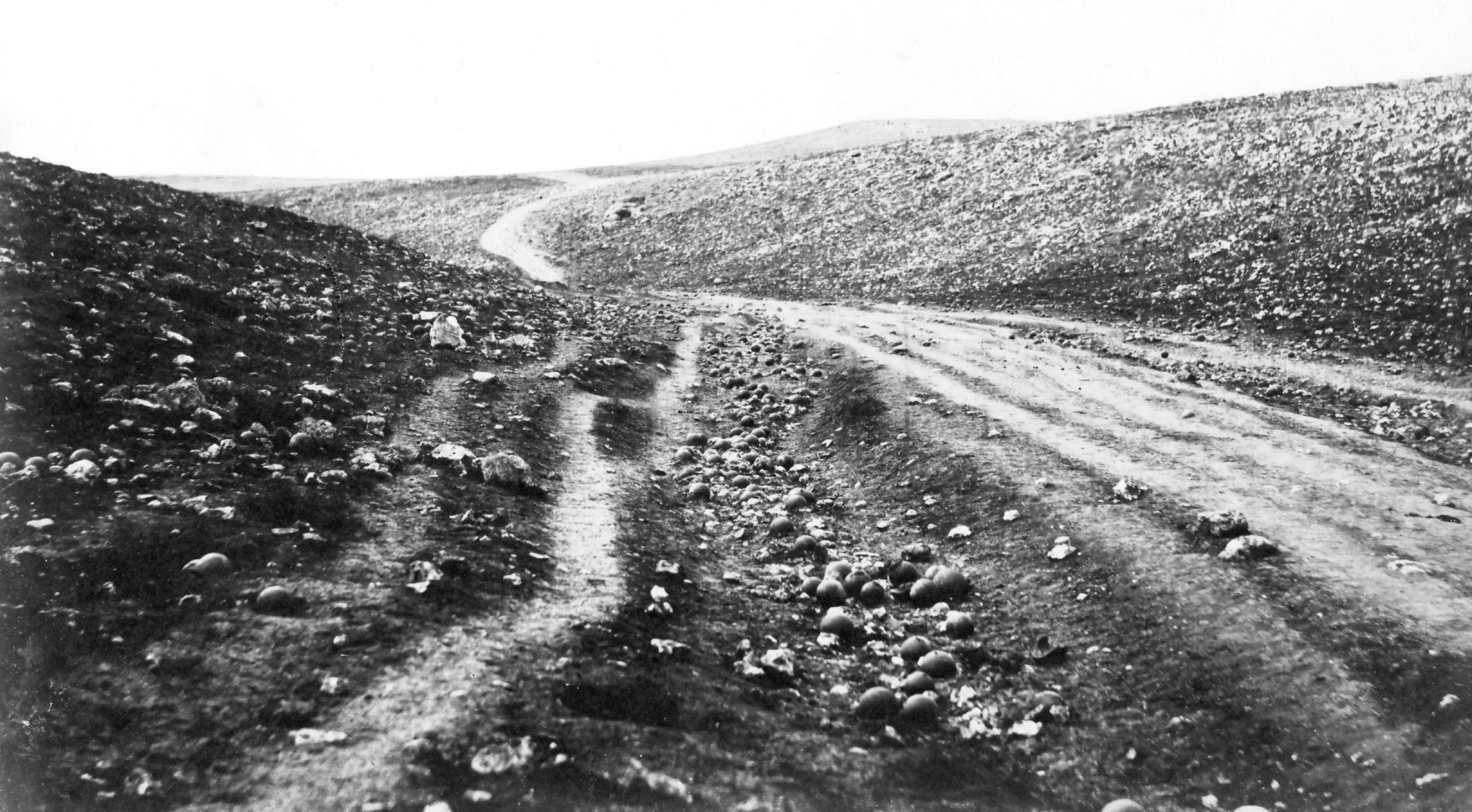
Valley of the Shadow of Death, with no cannonballs on the road

Film-maker Errol Morris went to Sevastopol in 2007 to identify the site of this "first iconic photograph of war". He was investigating a second version of the photograph without cannonballs on the road and the question as to the authenticity of the picture. Hitherto, opinions differed as to which was taken first, but Morris found evidence that the photo without the cannonballs was taken first. He remains uncertain about why balls were moved onto the road in the second picture—perhaps, he notes, Fenton deliberately placed them there to enhance the image. However, according to the Orsay Museum, "this is unlikely as the fighting raging around him would probably not have allowed him to do so". The alternative is that soldiers were gathering up cannonballs for reuse; they threw down balls higher up the hill onto the road and ditch for collection later.

== Public collections ==
There are prints of this photograph at The Royal Collection, the Victoria and Albert Museum, in London, the Musée d'Orsay, in Paris, the Museum of Modern Art, in New York, the Art Institute of Chicago, the J. Paul Getty Museum, in Los Angeles, the Princeton University Art Museum, in Princeton, and the Library of Congress, in Washington, D.C.

== See also ==
- List of photographs considered the most important
