= The Queen's Target =

Photograph by Roger Fenton

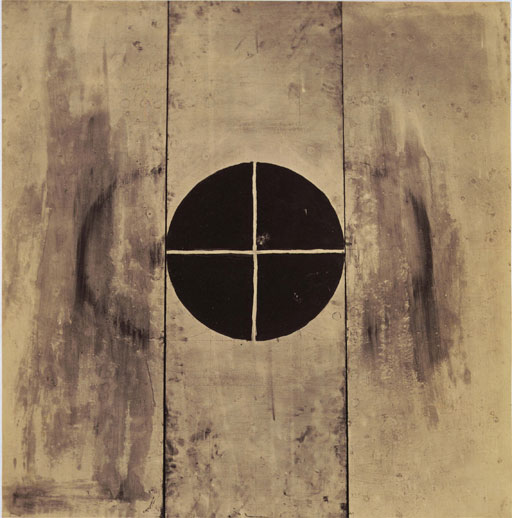
The Queen's Target (1860), version at the Museum Ludwig

The Queen's Target is a black and white photograph by the English photographer Roger Fenton, made in 1860. The picture was taken at the first Imperial Meeting, organised by the British National Rifle Association on Wimbledon Common in 1860, and it shows the target where Queen Victoria hit the bull's eye with her rifle.

== History and description ==
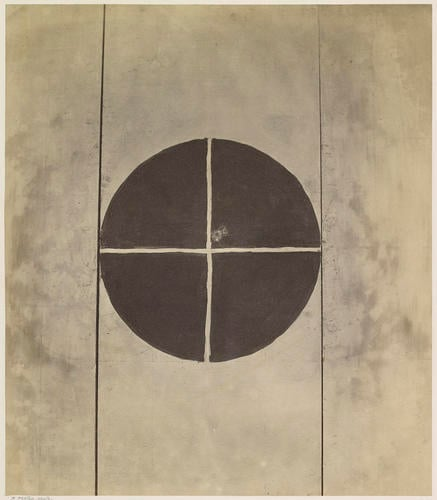
The Queen's Target (1860), version at The Royal Collection

Queen Victoria and her husband Prince Albert both attended the inaugural meeting of the National Rifle Association held in Wimbledon, on 2 July 1860. Fenton had been the founder of the Photographic Society, in 1853, and was able to interest the queen and her husband for the new medium of photography, which he was championing in England. He was present at the occasion and took several pictures. Victoria was given the honour to fire the first shot, and her precision was helped by the use of a mechanical rest to support a Whitworth rifle. An artist depicted in a sketch the exact position of the bullet of the queen, which pleased her. She asked to see the actual target, but since it was made of solid iron, making it difficult to carry, it was decided that Fenton would take a picture of it, which he did.

The final result is one of the most surprising photographs ever taken by Fenton, seemingly ahead of the aesthetic of the photography of his time. It seems today an abstract composition, focusing in the circular dark centre of the target, divided by a cross, and with the dent made by the bullet clearly visible in the lower part of its upper right side. Two lines ran across the target, touching the inner circle, and giving the picture an even more abstract quality. This picture was taken in the final phase of his work, when it become more challenging, both technically and artistically. He took then pictures of clouds, or of the dark interior of cathedrals, for example. Fenton would leave photography altogether in 1862, still leaving an important legacy.

== Reception ==
Francis Hodgson states: "What exactly persuaded Fenton to this degree of abstraction is unknown. It may have been purely practical: the target was made of iron, and a picture would have been a convenient record of the Queen’s opening shot.(...) It’s a Jasper Johns a century ahead of its time, and yet still a perfectly factual record of the Queen’s day at a rifle range". Bree Hocking also makes the connection to Johns: "So abstractly modern, the image invokes Pop artist Jasper Johns’ “Target” collages of a century hence."

The National Gallery of Art website states that photographs like this or The Long Walk, Windsor (1860), taken at the same year, "are radically simplified and daringly bold."

== Public collections ==
There are prints of this photograph at The Royal Collection, and at the Museum Ludwig, in Cologne. The first print was retouched to erase all the surface marks, but the Museum Ludwig print does show them.
