= Roger Fenton =

British photographer (1819–1869)

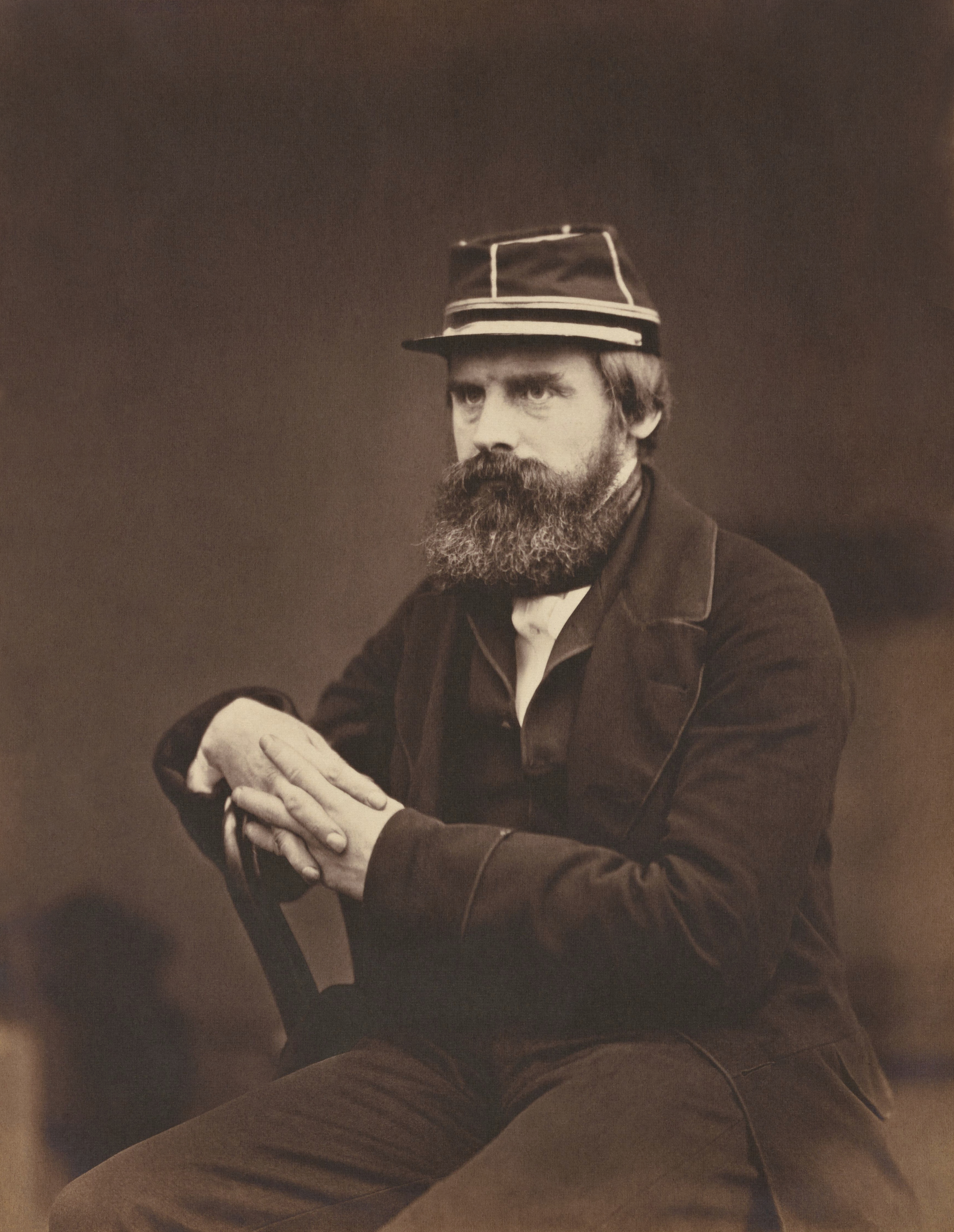
- Photograph of Fenton (published 1856)
- Born: 28 March 1819; Heywood, Lancashire, England
- Died: 8 August 1869 (aged 50); Potters Bar, Middlesex, England
- Education: University of London; Charles Lucy, Paris
- Known for: Photographer and painter
- Spouse: Grace Maynard (m. 1843)

Roger Fenton (28 March 1819 – 8 August 1869) was an English photographer, noted as one of the first war photographers.

Fenton was born into a Lancashire merchant family. After graduating from London with an arts degree, he became interested in painting. After seeing examples of the new technology of photography at the Great Exhibition in 1851, he became keenly interested in this new technique. Within a year, he began exhibiting his own photographs.

He became a leading British photographer and was instrumental in founding the Photographic Society (later the Royal Photographic Society). In 1854, he was commissioned to document events occurring in Crimea, where he became one of a small group of photographers to produce images of the final stages of the Crimean War.

== Early life ==
Fenton was born in Crimble Hall, Heywood, Lancashire, on 28 March 1819. His grandfather was a wealthy cotton manufacturer and banker, whilst his father, John, was a banker and from 1832 a member of parliament. Fenton was the fourth of seven children by his father's marriage to Elizabeth Apedaile, his first wife. His father remarried after her death and had 10 more children by his second wife. (Note: His brother Arthur married the novelist Gertrude Fenton (1841 -1884) in 1864.)

In 1840 Fenton graduated with a "first class" Bachelor of Arts degree from the University of London, having read English, mathematics, Greek and Latin. In 1841, he began to read law at University College, London, evidently sporadically as he did not qualify as a solicitor until 1847. He had also become interested in studying painting. In Yorkshire in 1843 Fenton married Grace Elizabeth Maynard, presumably after his first sojourn in Paris (his passport was issued in 1842), where he may briefly have studied painting in the studio of Paul Delaroche. When he registered as a copyist in the Louvre in 1844, he named his teacher as Michel Martin Drolling, a history and portrait painter who taught at the École nationale supérieure des Beaux-Arts, but Fenton's name does not appear in the school records.

By 1847 Fenton had returned to London, where he continued to study painting under the tutelage of history painter Charles Lucy. They became friends and, starting in 1850, the two men served on the board of the North London School of Drawing and Modelling. In 1849, 1850 and 1851 Fenton exhibited paintings in the annual exhibitions of the Royal Academy.

== Established in London ==
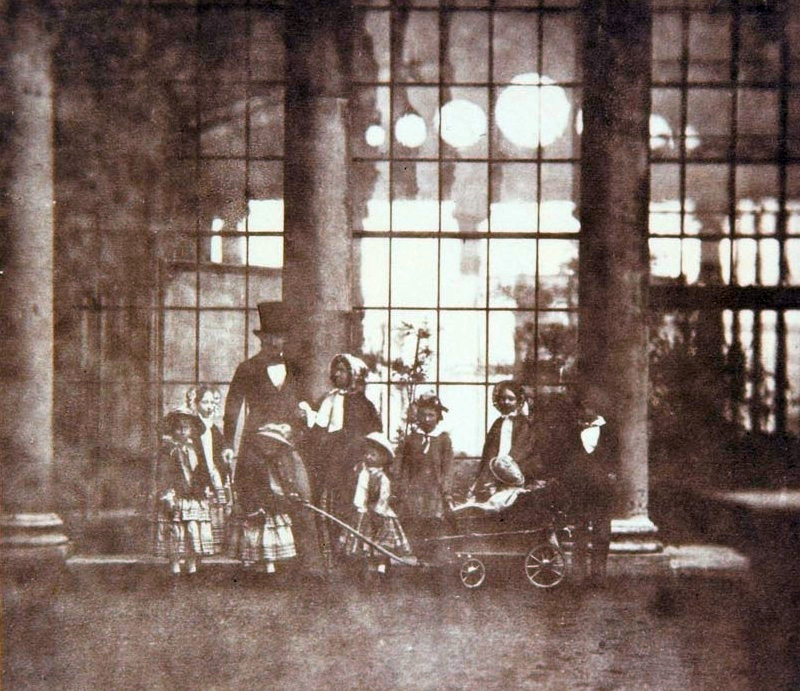
Queen Victoria, Prince Albert and royal children at Buckingham Palace, 1854

Fenton visited the Great Exhibition in Hyde Park in London in 1851 and was impressed by the photography on display there. He visited Paris to learn the waxed paper calotype process, most likely from Gustave Le Gray, who had modified the methods employed by William Henry Fox Talbot, its inventor. By 1852 Fenton had photographs exhibited in Britain. He travelled to photograph Kiev, Moscow and St. Petersburg, and also photographed views and architecture around Britain.

In 1853 the British Museum commissioned Fenton to record some of its collection of rare historical artefacts. He established an open-air studio on the museum's roof. Museum staff manhandled the items into the daylight and dusted them with chalk (to avoid reflections) for his procedures. These were unpaid commissions, but Fenton was allowed to sell the prints on his own account, eventually setting up a shop at the museum entrance.

Queen Victoria commissioned Fenton to produce a series of royal portraits in 1854. As well as formal studio portraits, he made informal tableaux vivants of the queen at Balmoral, Windsor Castle and Buckingham Palace.

=== Royal Photographic Society ===
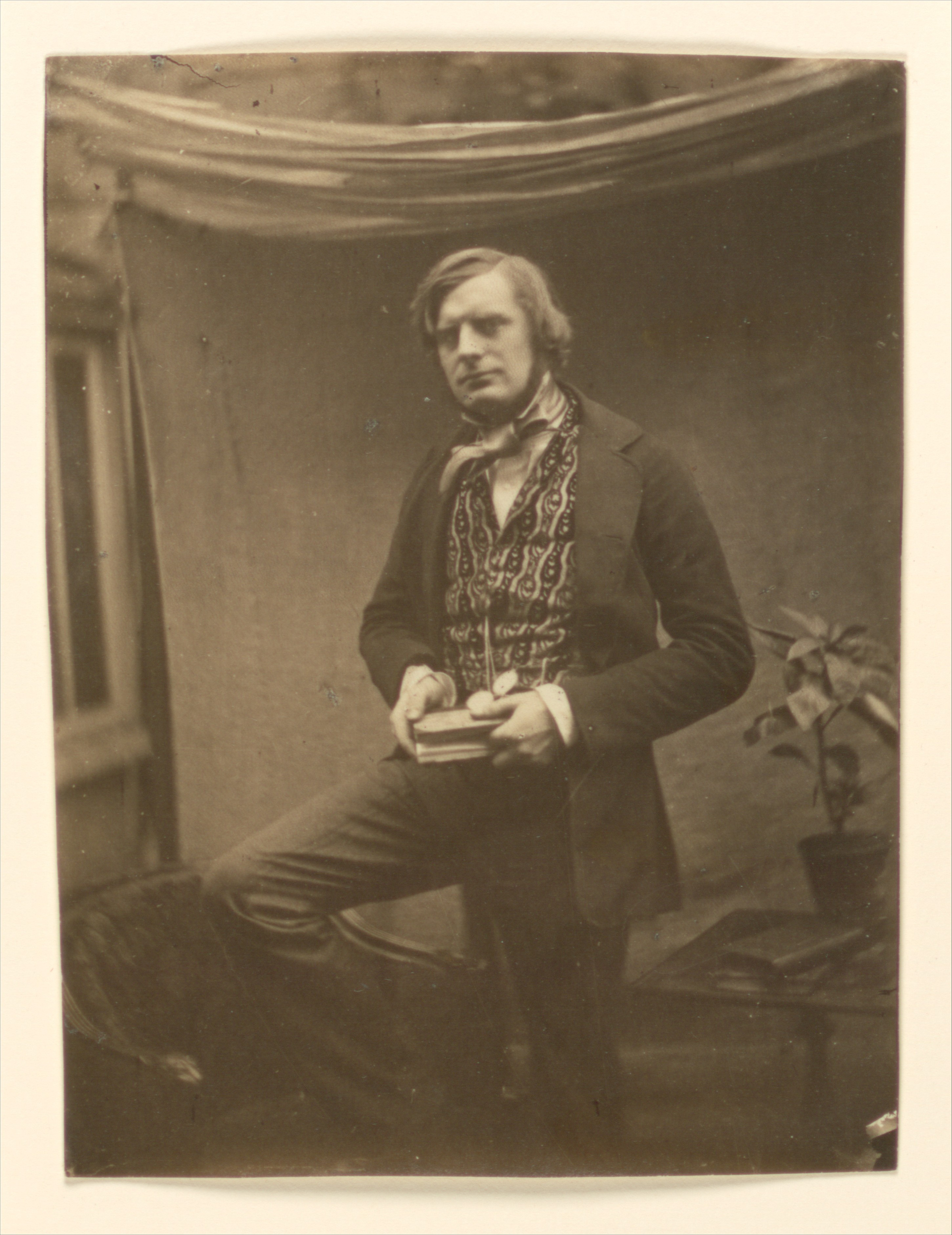
Self-portrait of Fenton, 1852

In 1852, in collaboration with commercial photographer Antoine Claudet, Fenton published a manifesto: Proposal for the Formation of a Photographic Society. In 1853 he became a founder and first secretary of the London Photographic Society. It later became the Royal Photographic Society under the patronage of Prince Albert. In 1980, the RPS instituted the ‘Fenton Medal’ awarded to three or four members of the RPS each year, to acknowledge those members’ extraordinary service to the Society.

== Crimean War ==
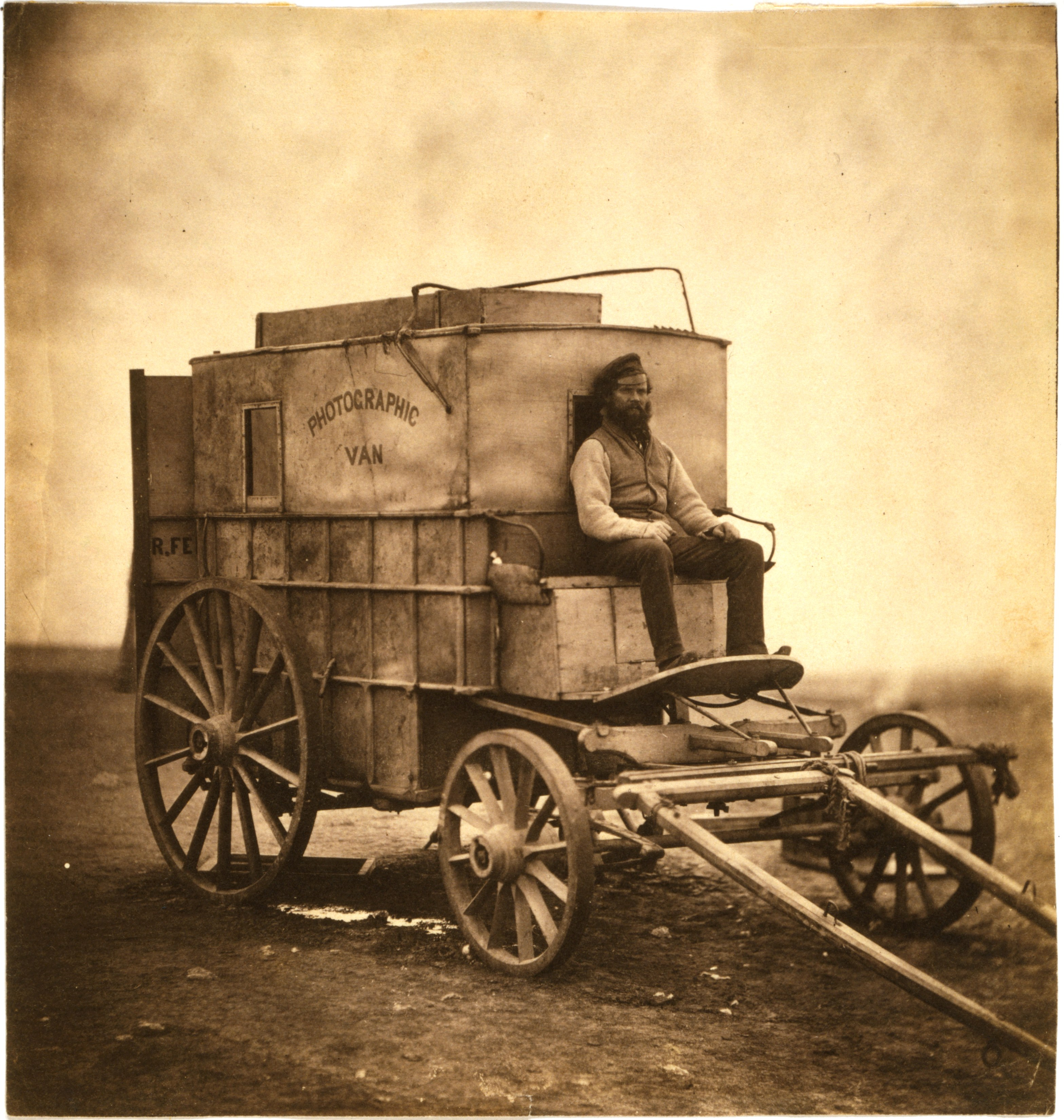
Marcus Sparling seated on Fenton's photographic van, Crimea, 1855.

It is likely that in autumn 1854, as the Crimean War grabbed the attention of the British public, that some powerful friends and patrons – among them Prince Albert and Duke of Newcastle, Secretary of State for War – urged Fenton to go to the Crimea to record events. The London print publisher Thomas Agnew & Sons became his commercial sponsor. The resulting photographs may have been intended to offset the general unpopularity of the war among the British people, and to counteract the occasionally critical reporting of correspondent William Howard Russell of The Times. The photographs were to be converted into woodblocks for printing and published in the less critical Illustrated London News.

Fenton set off aboard HMS Hecla in February, landed at Balaklava on 8 March and remained there until 22 June. Fenton took Marcus Sparling as his photographic assistant, a servant known as William, and a large horse-drawn van of equipment.

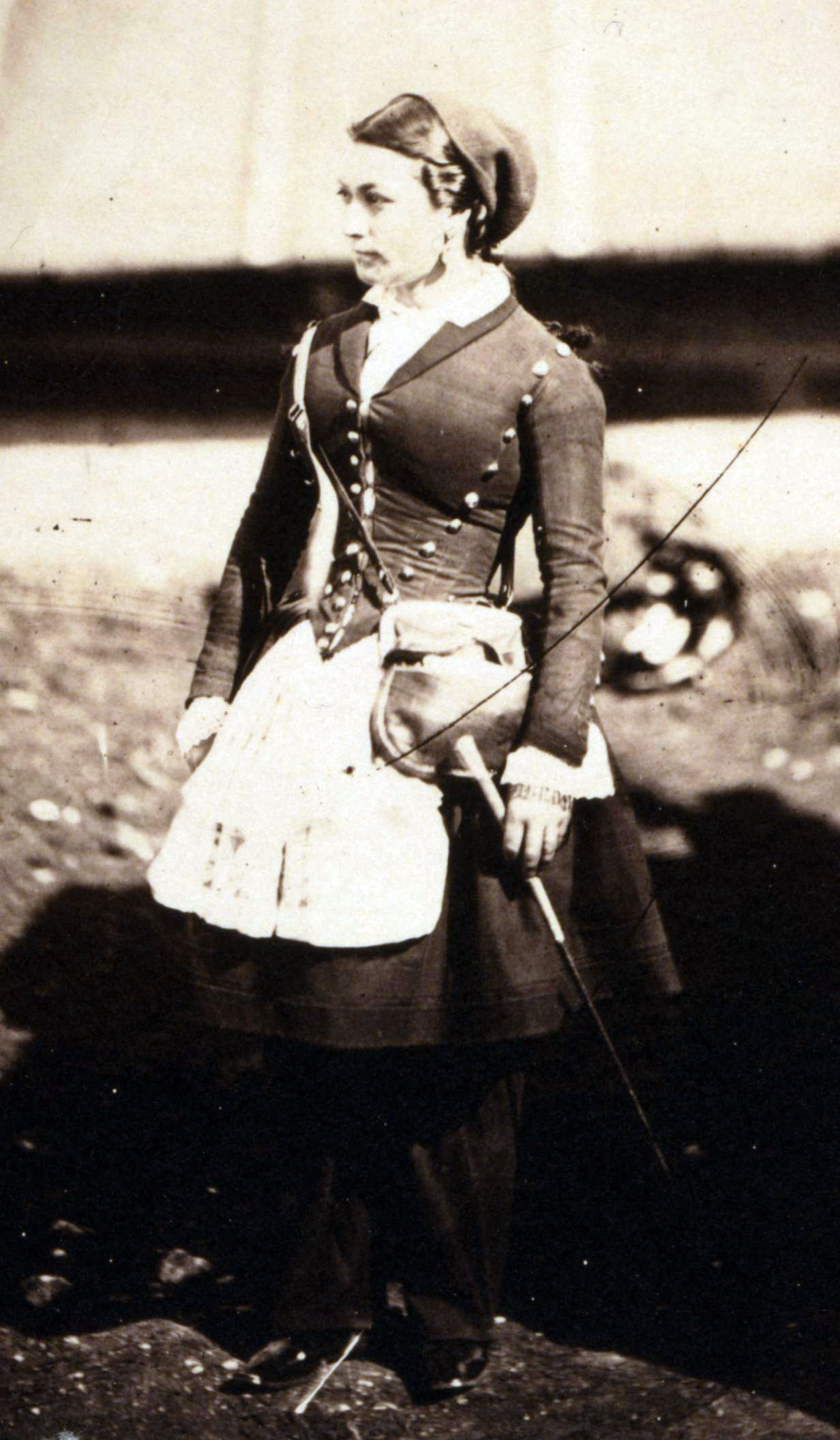
A French vivandiere (cantinière) wearing Zouave regimental dress, during the Crimean War in 1855.

Due to the size and cumbersome nature of his photographic equipment, Fenton was limited in his choice of motifs. Because the photographic material of his time needed long exposures, he was able to produce only photographs of stationary objects, mostly posed pictures. He avoided taking pictures of dead, injured or mutilated soldiers. His images of people included a woman working as a vivandière.

Fenton photographed the landscape, including an area near to where the Charge of the Light Brigade took place. This event was made famous by Tennyson in his poem of the same name. Fenton's photograph does not show the actual site of the charge, which took place in a long, broad valley several miles to the south-east. In letters home soldiers had called the original valley "The Valley of Death", and Tennyson's poem used the same phrase.

In September 1855 Thomas Agnew put Fenton's photograph on show in London, as one of a series of eleven collectively titled Panorama of the Plateau of Sebastopol in Eleven Parts. He titled it as The Valley of the Shadow of Death, with a deliberate evocation of Psalm 23.

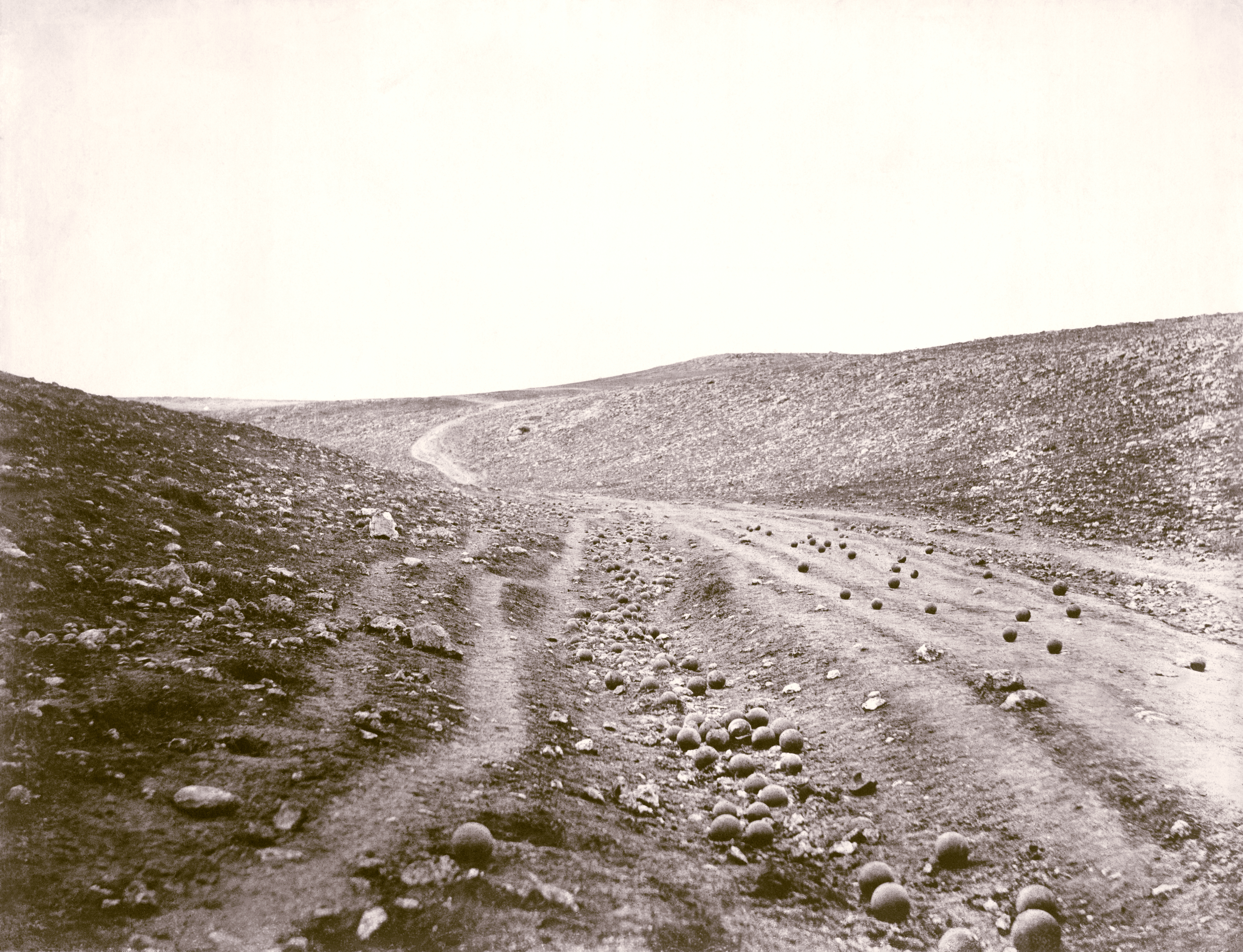
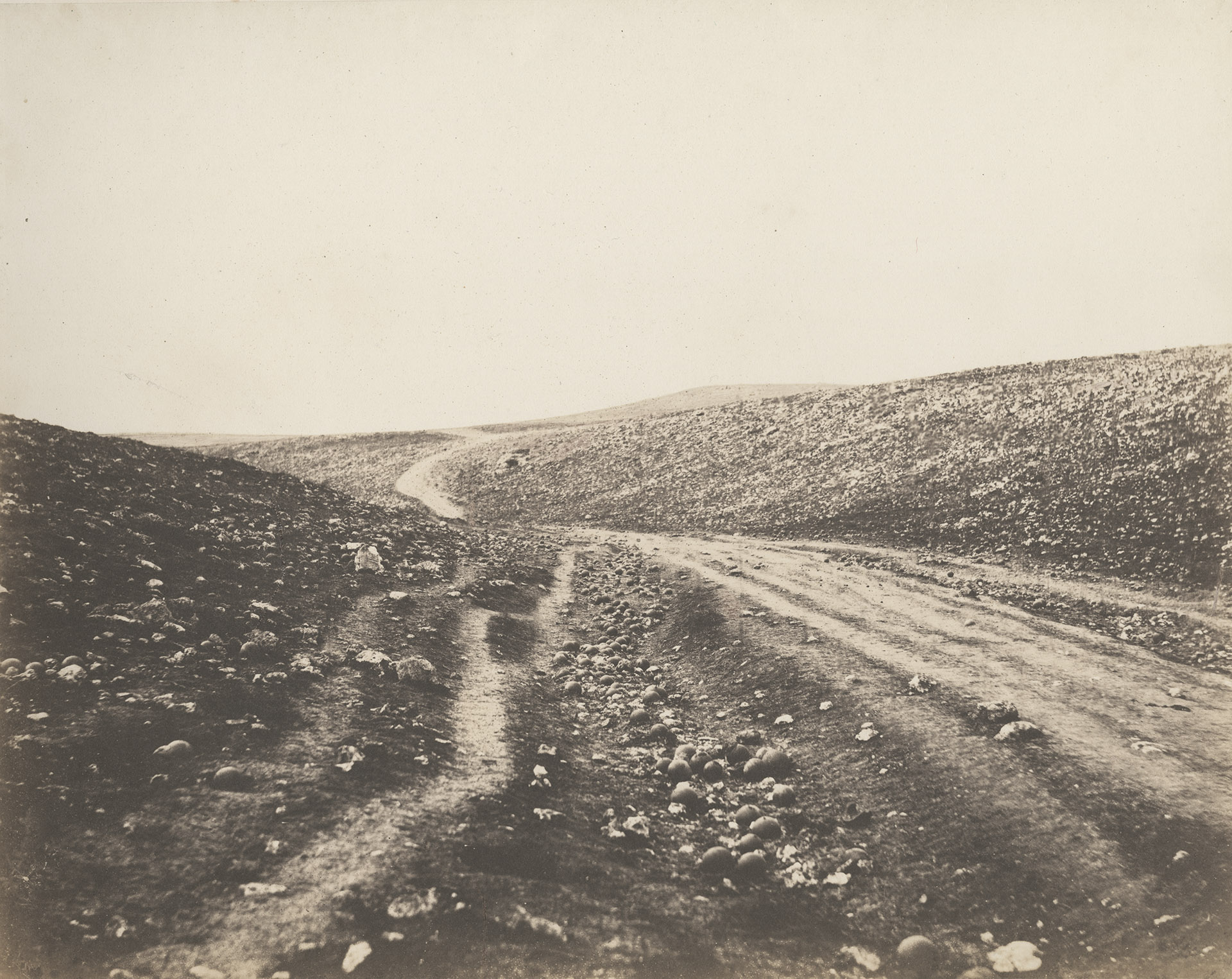
Versions of Valley of the Shadow of Death, with and without cannonballs on the road

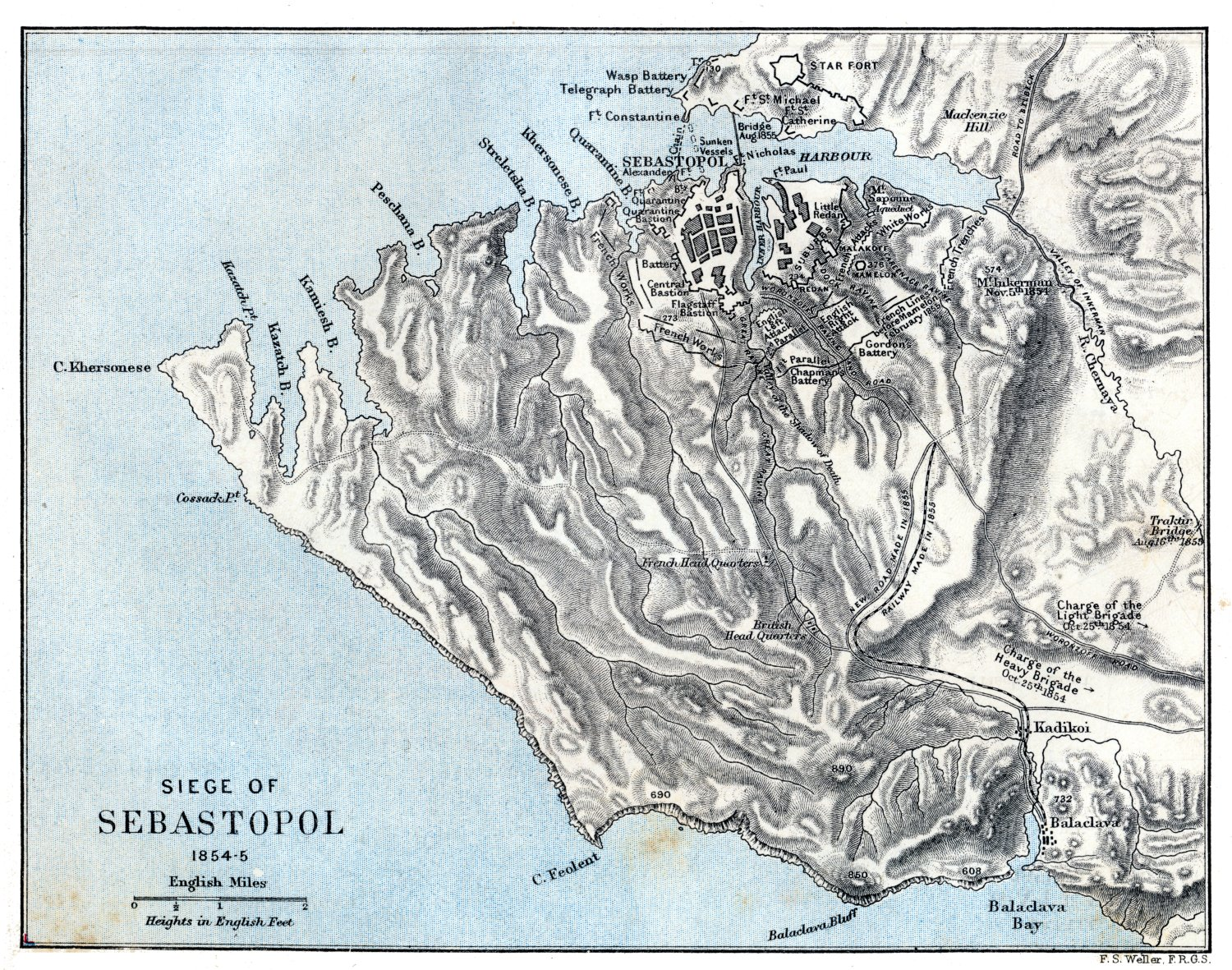
Approach roads to Sevastopol, and the "valley of death" (centre)

In 2007 American film-maker Errol Morris went to Sevastopol to identify the site of this "first iconic photograph of war". He identified the small valley, shown on a later map as "The Valley of the Shadow of Death", as the place where Fenton had taken his photograph (see right). Fenton had taken two pictures of this area, one with several cannonballs on the road, the other with an empty road. Opinions had differed concerning which one was taken first, but Morris spotted evidence that the photo without the cannonballs was taken first. He remains uncertain about why balls were moved onto the road in the second picture: perhaps, he notes, Fenton deliberately placed them there to enhance the image. The alternative is that soldiers were gathering cannonballs for reuse and they threw down balls from higher up the hill onto the road and ditch for collection later. Art historians, such as Nigel Spivey of Cambridge University, identify the images as from the nearby Woronzoff Road. In June 1855 illustrator and war correspondent William Simpson produced a watercolour of the Woronzoff Road, with a view downhill. It has cannonballs placed similarly to those shown by Fenton; Simpson's publisher too used the title "The Valley of the Shadow of Death". This is the location accepted by the local tour guides.

Despite undergoing summer high temperatures, breaking several ribs in a fall, suffering from cholera (the effects of which contributed to his early death) and becoming depressed at the carnage he witnessed at Sevastopol, in all Fenton managed to make more than 350 usable large-format negatives. An exhibition of 312 prints was soon on show in London, and at various places across the nation in the months that followed. Fenton also showed them to Queen Victoria and Prince Albert and to Emperor Napoleon III in Paris. Nevertheless, he was disappointed at sales being less than he expected.

== Post Crimea ==
Despite the lack of commercial success for his Crimean photographs, Fenton later travelled widely over Britain to record landscapes and still life images. As time passed, photography became more accessible to the general public. Many people sought to profit from selling quick portraits to common people. It is likely that Fenton, from a wealthy background, disdained 'trade' photographers, but he still wanted to profit from the art by taking exclusive images and selling them at good prices. This led to conflict with those of his fellow photographers who genuinely needed to make money from photography and were willing to 'cheapen their art' (as Fenton saw it). He also was in conflict with the Photographic Society, who believed that no photographer should soil himself with the 'sin' of exploiting his talent commercially in any manner.

Amongst Fenton's photographic subjects from this period are the City of Westminster, including The Palace of Westminster nearing completion in 1857. His are almost certainly the earliest images of the building, and the only photographs showing the incomplete Clock Tower.

== Later life ==
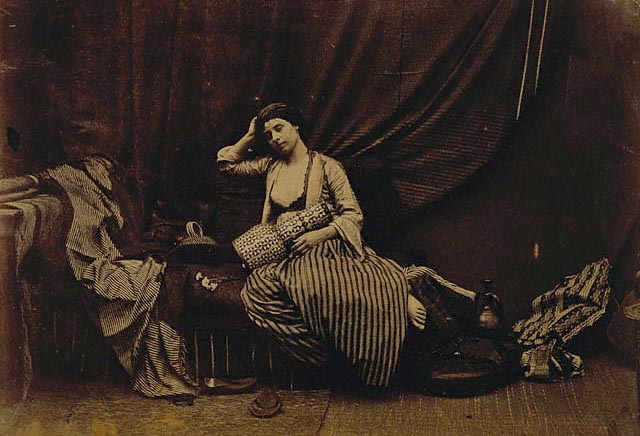
Seated Odalisque by Roger Fenton

In 1858 Fenton made studio genre studies based on romantically imaginative ideas of Muslim life, such as Seated Odalisque, using friends and models who were not always convincing in their roles. Although he became well known for his Crimean War photography, his photographic career lasted little more than a decade. In 1862 he sold his equipment and abandoned the profession entirely, returning to the practice of law as a barrister. Although almost forgotten by the time of his death seven years later, he was later formally recognised by art historians for his pioneering work and artistic endeavour.

In 1862 the organising committee for the International Exhibition in London announced its plans to place photography, not with the other fine arts as had been done in the Manchester Art Treasures Exhibition only five years earlier, but in the section reserved for machinery, tools and instruments; they classified photography as a craft, for tradesmen. For Fenton and many of his colleagues, this was conclusive proof of photography's diminished status, and the pioneers drifted away.

Three of Fenton's children died in this decade: Josephine (d.1850). Ann (d.1855) and Anthony (d.1861); they are buried on the west side of Highgate Cemetery in a plot adjoining the grave of Christina Rossetti and Elizabeth Siddal.

Fenton moved with his remaining family from Albert Terrace, Regent's Park to Potters Bar, Middlesex, perhaps for healthier air. He died there at age 50 on 8 August 1869 after a week-long illness. His wife died in 1886. Their graves in the local churchyard were destroyed in 1969 when the Potters Bar church was deconsecrated and demolished. In 2005, 90 of Fenton's images were included in a special exhibition devoted to this "most important nineteenth-century photographer" at the Tate Britain gallery, London. In 2007, Fenton was inducted into the International Photography Hall of Fame and Museum.

== See also ==
- History of photography
- Felice Beato
- John McCosh
- L'Entente Cordiale
- The Queen's Target
- James Robertson (photographer)
