= Charles Lucy =

English painter (1814–1873)

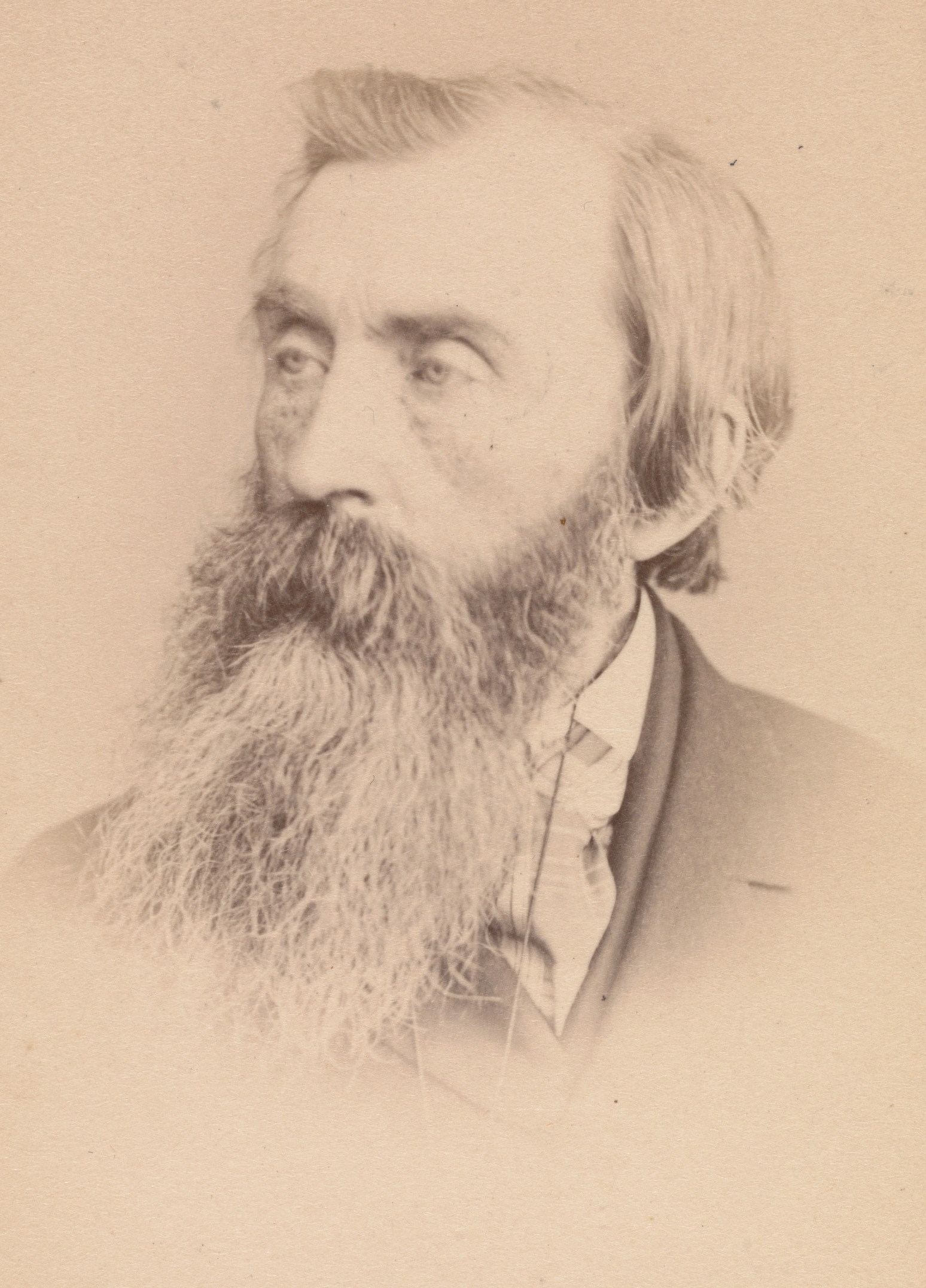
- Born: 1814; Hereford, England
- Died: 18 May 1873 (aged 58–59); Notting Hill, London, England
- Children: 1

Charles Lucy (1814 – 18 May 1873) was a British historical painter active during the Victorian era. Born in Hereford, he studied at the École des Beaux-Arts and Royal Academy of Arts. He won multiple prizes in art competitions held during the rebuilding of the Houses of Parliament, but none were ultimately displayed within the building. Various engravings and sketches were made of his works, which included historical scenes alongside portraits of various historical and contemporary political figures. He served as the co-founder and instructor of a drawing school in Camden Town, London. Following years of declining health, he died in 1873.

== Biography ==
Lucy was born in Hereford in 1814. He began work as an apprentice to his uncle, a chemist, but pursued art as a hobby from an early age. He produced his first painting while in Hereford, an allegorical celebration of the Reform Bill, which was hung in the offices of the Hereford Times. After a brief stay in London, he travelled to Paris in order to attend the École des Beaux-Arts, where he studied under the Romanticist Paul Delaroche. After some time in Paris, he returned to London to study at the Royal Academy of Arts. As a student, he supported himself through commissions. Following graduation, he was hired as a copyist and created various copies of historic works held at Paris and the Hague.

=== Career ===
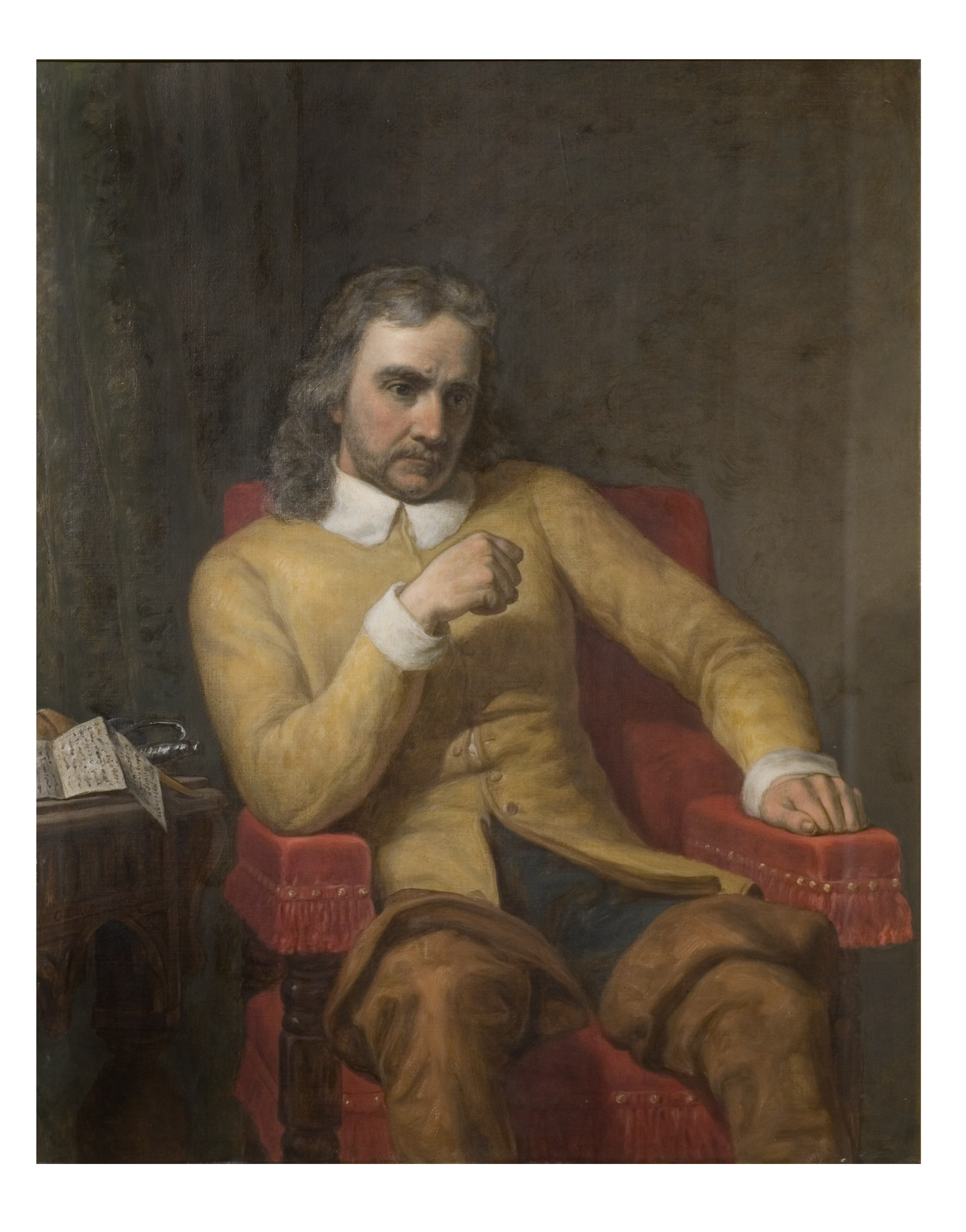
Oliver Cromwell, by Lucy, 1868

He first exhibited a portrait at the Royal Academy in 1838, where he was recorded as living in Hereford. He exhibited The Interview between Milton and Galileo at the Royal Academy in 1840, followed by two additional paintings in 1843. An Illustrated London News obituary describes a fourteen-year stay at the French artist colony of Barbizon, but this is not attested in other biographies. By 1845, he lived in London, where he shared a studio with fellow historical painter Ford Madox Brown. He founded a drawing school at Camden Town alongside Cave Thomas and Thomas Seddon, where he would teach for a number of years.

In 1844, for the second contest of the Fine Arts Commission (created to furnish the reconstructed Houses of Parliament) he created a large fresco, The Roman empress Agrippina interceding with the emperor Claudius, on behalf of the family of Caractacus. He won a £100 premium, but was not appointed to create a work for the House of Lords. Two later pieces produced in 1845 and 1847 were rejected by the Commission, but he was awarded a £200 premium in 1847 for The Departure of the Pilgrim Fathers. A large painting measuring 10 by 13 feet, it depicts the Pilgrims departing from Delfshaven. It was ultimately not included within the House, but exhibited across much of the United Kingdom during the early 1850s, and was later donated to the Pilgrim Hall Museum. The same subject matter was ultimately painted in the House of Lords by Charles West Cope. A now-lost painting by Lucy, depicting the Pilgrim's arrival at Plymouth Rock, served the basis for a heavily circulated engraving produced c. 1850.

Lucy produced various historical paintings which later served the basis for engravings. His Nelson meditating in the cabin of the Victory previously to the battle of Trafalgar was exhibited at the Royal Academy in 1854, before being sold to Robert Peel the following year. Joshua Walmsley commissioned eight portrait paintings from Lucy in 1869, now held at the Victoria and Albert Museum. He was plagued with health problems in his later years, and died at Notting Hill in London on 18 May 1873, leaving behind a number of unfinished commissions. He had one son, Charles Hampden Lucy.
