= War photography =

Photographic documentation of wars

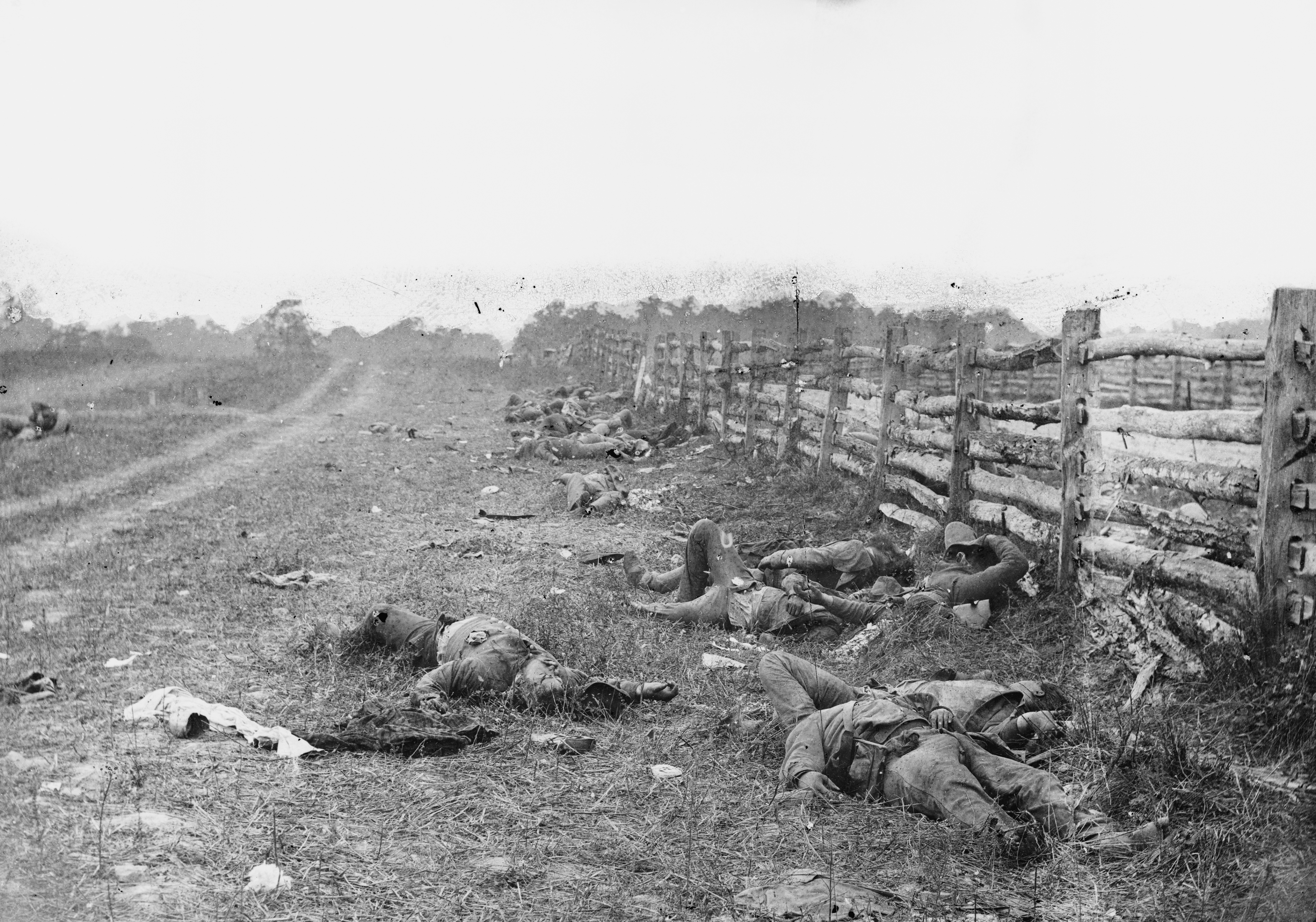
Bodies on the battlefield at Antietam, 1862, Alexander Gardner

War photography involves photographing armed conflict and its effects on people and places. Photographers who participate in this genre may find themselves placed in harm's way, and are sometimes killed trying to get their pictures out of the war arena.

== History ==
=== Origins ===
With the invention of photography in the 1830s, the possibility of capturing the events of war to enhance public awareness was first explored. Although ideally photographers would have liked to accurately record the rapid action of combat, the technical insufficiency of early photographic equipment in recording movement made this impossible. The daguerreotype, an early form of photography that generated a single image using a silver-coated copper plate, took a very long time for the image to develop and could not be processed immediately.

Since early photographers were not able to create images of moving subjects, they recorded more sedentary aspects of war, such as fortifications, soldiers, and land before and after battle along with the re-creation of action scenes. Similar to battle photography, portrait images of soldiers were also often staged. In order to produce a photograph, the subject had to be perfectly still for a matter of minutes, so they were posed to be comfortable and minimize movement.

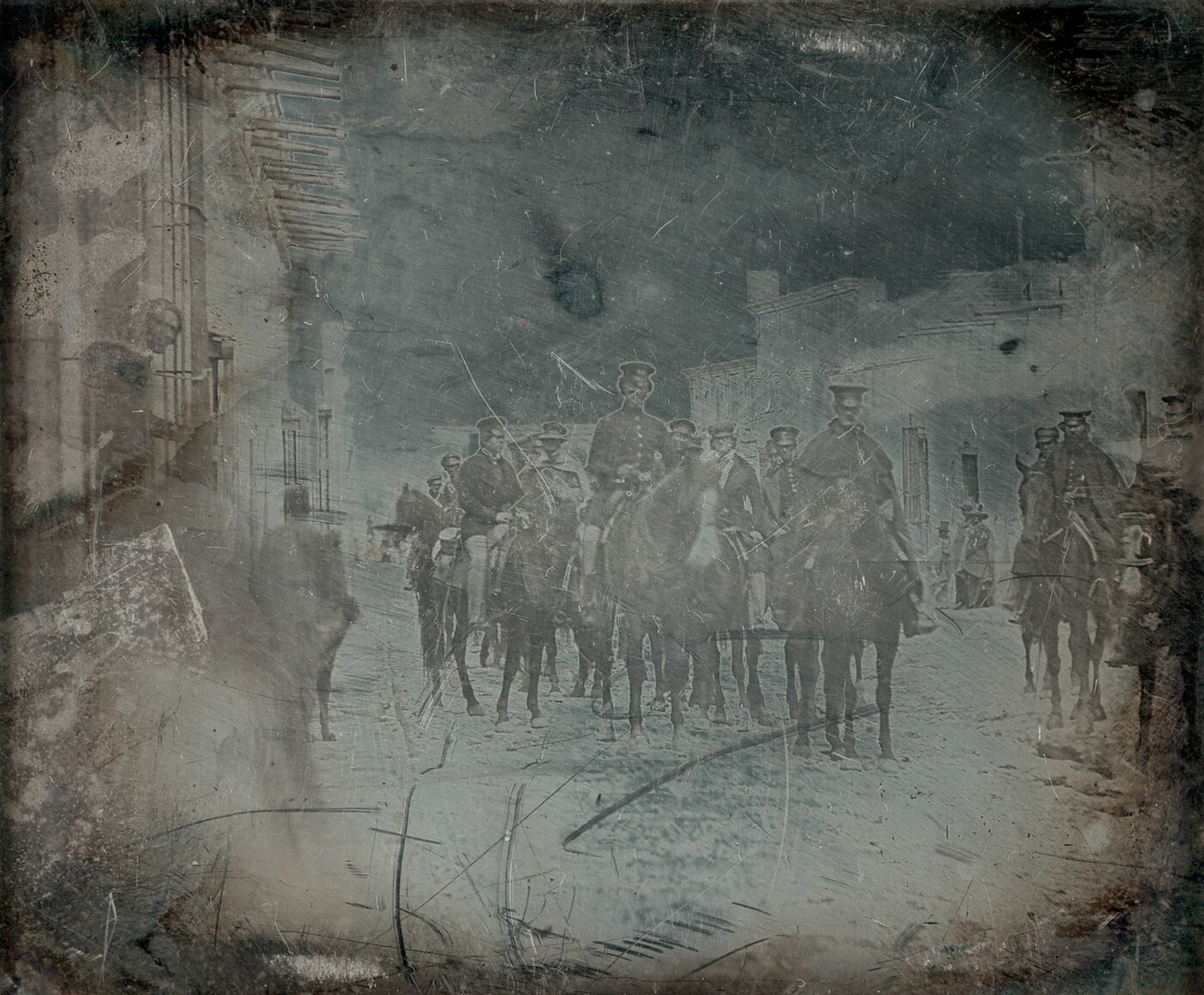
General Wool and staff in the Calle Real, Saltillo, Mexico, taken by an unknown photographer during the Mexican-American war, c. 1847

The Mexican-American War was the first one to be captured by a camera. A number of daguerreotypes were taken of the occupation of Saltillo during the Mexican–American War, in 1847 by an unknown photographer, although not for the purpose of journalism. The photographs do not show the wounded, dead bodies, nor live combat zones, with no glorification of warfare being evident. What they do show are portraits of military men, landscapes, street scenes, and post-battle burial grounds.

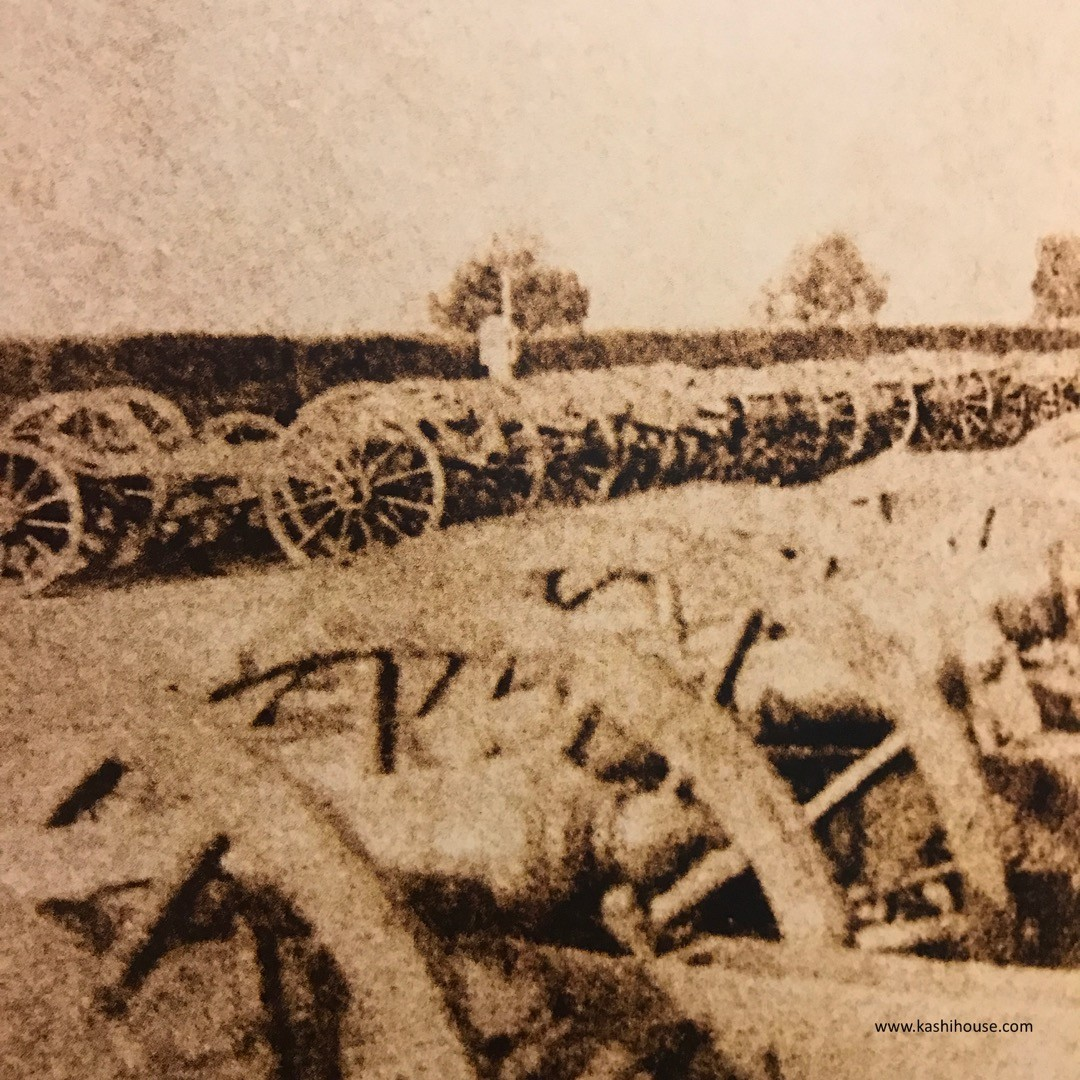
Captured Sikh guns of the Sikh Empire parked in Ambala Cantonment in the aftermath of the Second Anglo-Sikh War, calotype or daguerreotype by John McCosh, circa April 1849.

John McCosh, a surgeon in the Bengal Army, is considered by some historians to be the first war photographer known by name. He produced a series of photographs documenting the Second Anglo-Sikh War from 1848 to 1849. These consisted of portraits of fellow officers, key figures from the campaigns, administrators and their wives and daughters, including Patrick Alexander Vans Agnew, Hugh Gough, 1st Viscount Gough; the British commander General Sir Charles James Napier; and Dewan Mulraj, the governor of Multan. He also photographed local people and architecture, artillery emplacements and the destructive aftermath. McCosh later photographed the Second Anglo-Burmese War (1852–53) where he photographed colleagues, captured guns, temple architecture in Yangon and Burmese people.

The Hungarian–Romanian Károly Szathmáry Papp took photographs of various officers in 1853 and of war scenes near Olteniţa and Silistra in 1854, during the Crimean War. He personally offered some 200 pictures albums to Napoleon III of France and Queen Victoria of the United Kingdom in 1855.

Stefano Lecchi between 1849 and 1859 took photos of the battle locations of the Roman Republic using the Calotype process.

=== Establishment ===
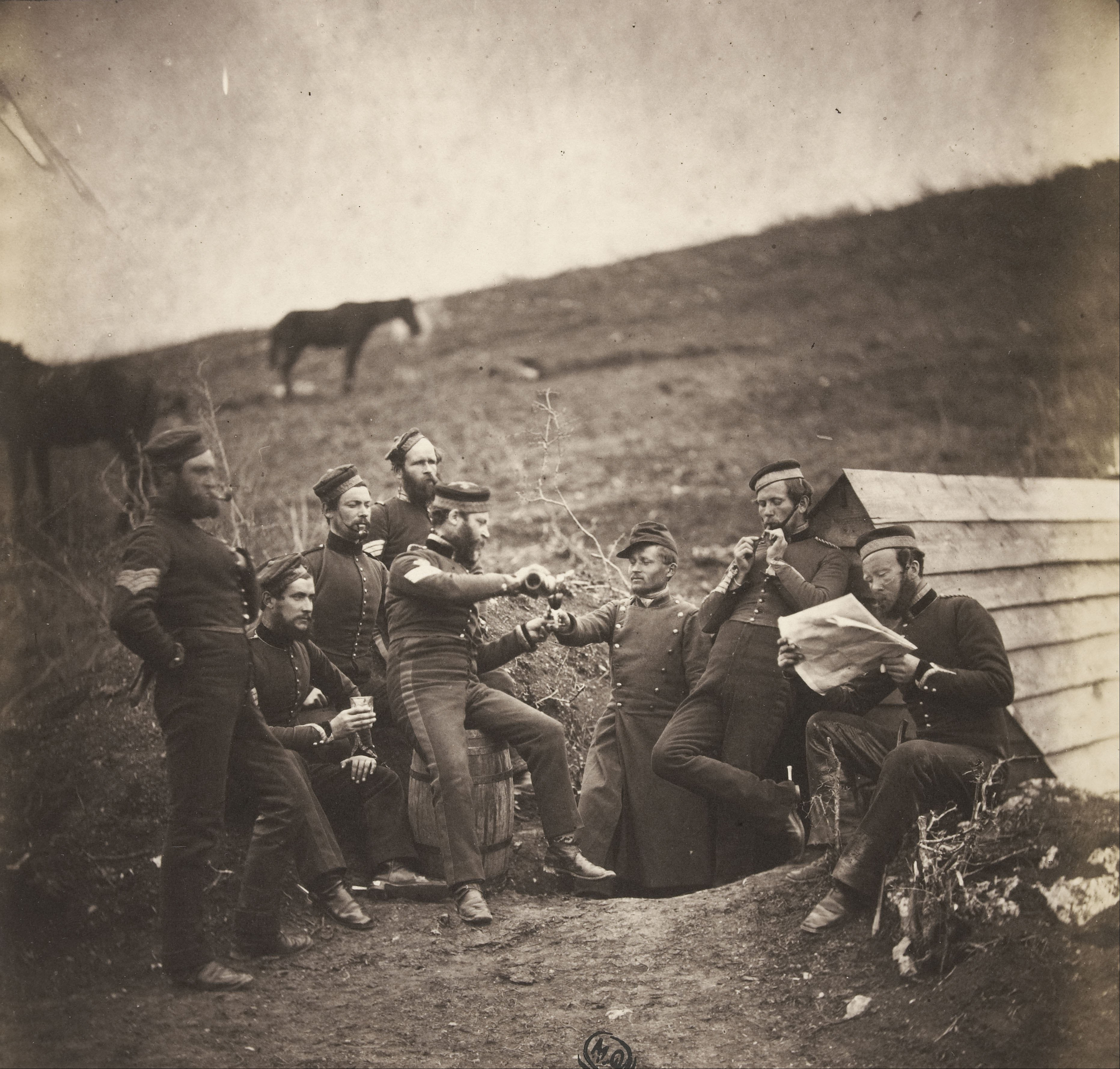
Roger Fenton was one of the first war photographers. He captured images of the Crimean War (1853–1856)

The first official attempts at war photography were made by the British government at the start of the Crimean War. In March 1854, Gilbert Elliott was commissioned to photograph views of the Russian fortifications along the coast of the Baltic Sea. Roger Fenton was the first official war photographer and the first to attempt a systematic coverage of war for the benefit of the public.

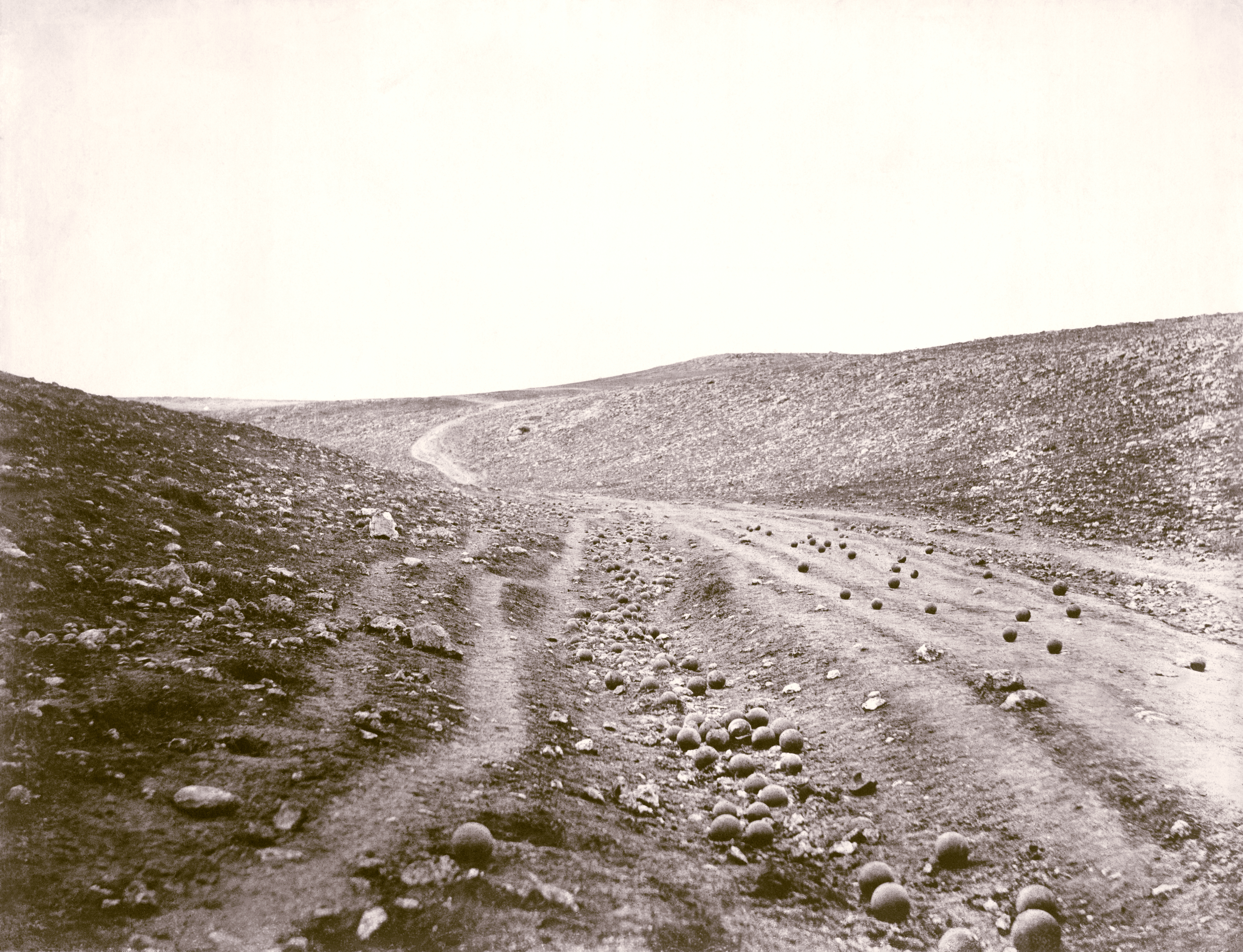
Valley of the Shadow of Death, 1855, by Roger Fenton

Hired by Thomas Agnew, he landed at Balaclava in 1854. His photographs were probably intended to offset the general aversion of the British people to the war's unpopularity, and to counteract the occasionally critical reporting of correspondent William Howard Russell of The Times. The photos were converted into woodblocks and published in The Illustrated London News.

Due to the size and cumbersome nature of his photographic equipment, Fenton was limited in his choice of motifs. Because the photographic material of his time needed long exposures, he was only able to produce pictures of stationary objects, mostly posed pictures and avoided making pictures of dead, injured or mutilated soldiers.

Fenton also photographed the landscape – his most famous image was of the area near to where the Charge of the Light Brigade took place. In letters home soldiers had called the original valley The Valley of Death, so when in September 1855 Thomas Agnew put the picture on show as one of a series of eleven collectively titled Panorama of the Plateau of Sebastopol in Eleven Parts in a London exhibition, he took the troops' epithet, expanded it as The Valley of the Shadow of Death and assigned it to the piece.

=== Further development ===
Fenton left Crimea in 1855, and was replaced by the partnership of James Robertson and Felice Beato. In contrast to Fenton's depiction of the dignified aspects of war, Beato and Robertson showed the destruction. They photographed the fall of Sevastopol in September 1855, producing about 60 images.

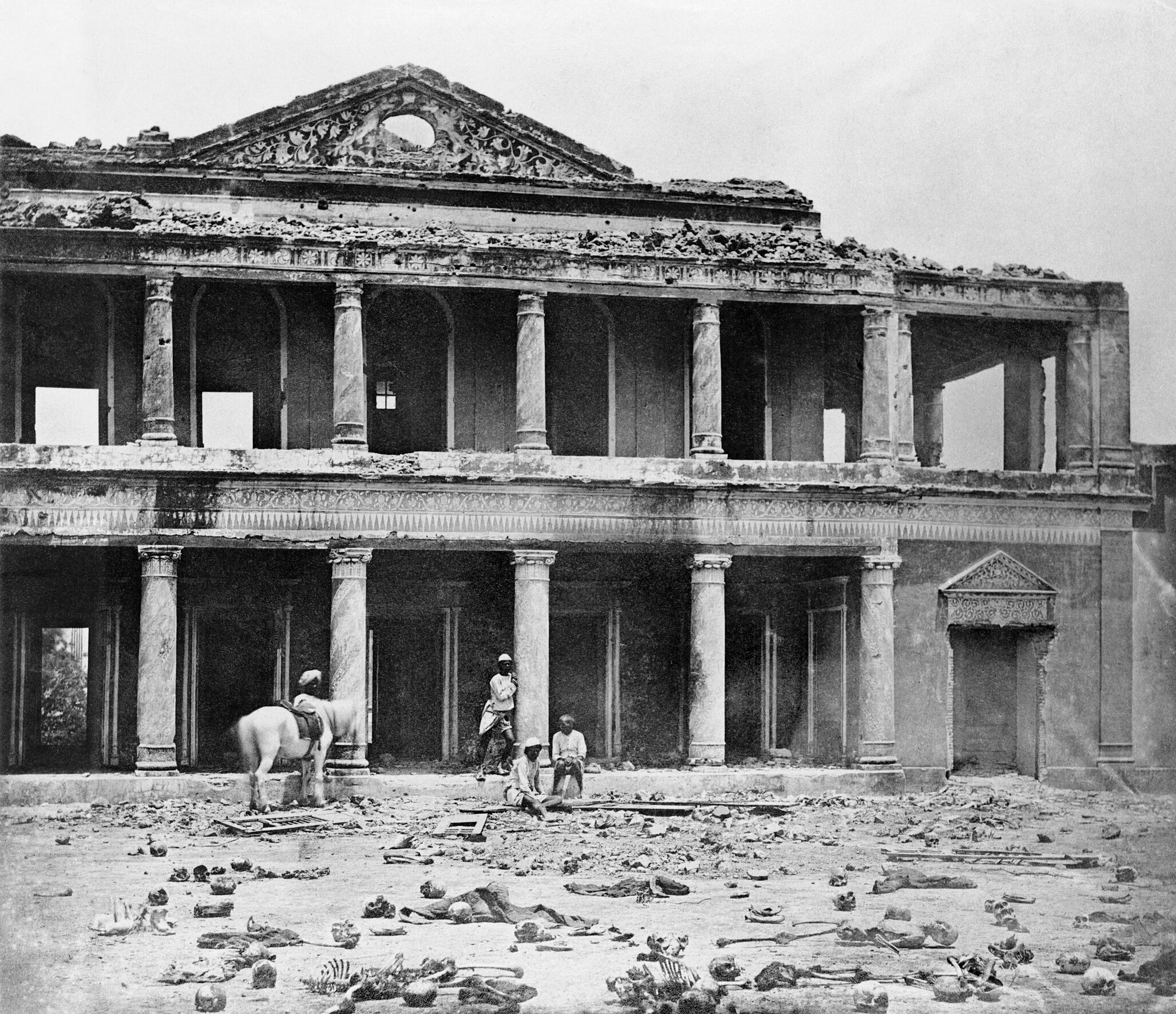
Ruins of Sikandar Bagh, 1858, by Felice Beato

In February 1858, they arrived in Calcutta to document the aftermath of the Indian Rebellion of 1857. During this time they produced possibly the first-ever photographic images of corpses. It is believed that for at least one of the photographs taken at the palace of Sikandar Bagh in Lucknow, the skeletal remains of Indian rebels were disinterred or rearranged to heighten the photograph's dramatic impact.

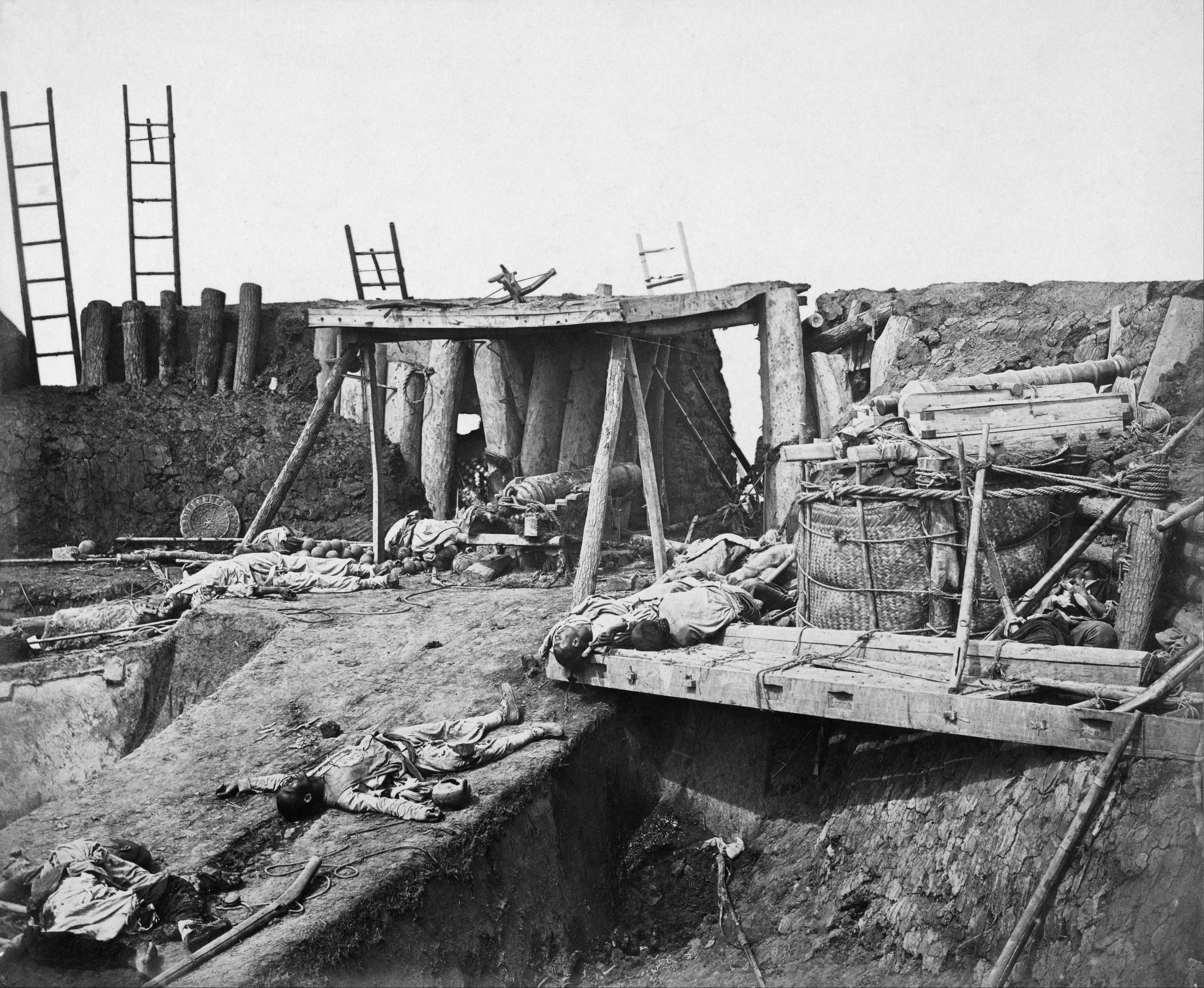
Interior of Fort Taku, 1860, by Felice Beato

In 1860 Beato left the partnership and documented the progress of the Anglo-French campaign during the Second Opium War. Teaming up with Charles Wirgman, a correspondent for The Illustrated London News, he accompanied the attack force travelling north to the Taku Forts. Beato's photographs of the Second Opium War were the first to document a military campaign as it unfolded, doing so through a sequence of dated and related images. His photographs of the Taku Forts formed a narrative recreation of the battle, showing the approach to the forts, the effects of bombardments on the exterior walls and fortifications, and finally the devastation within the forts, including the bodies of dead Chinese soldiers.

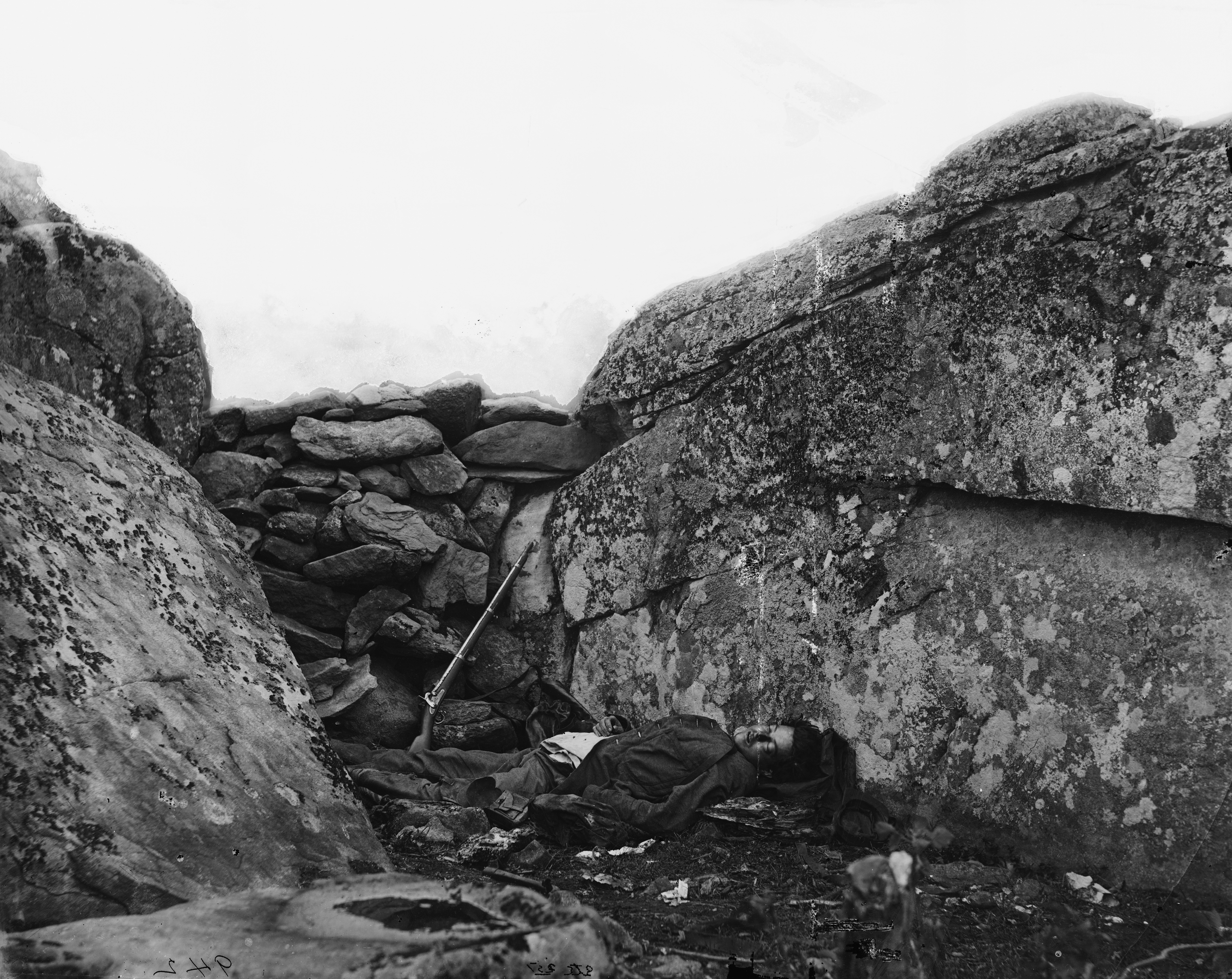
The Home of a rebel Sharpshooter, 1863, by Alexander Gardner

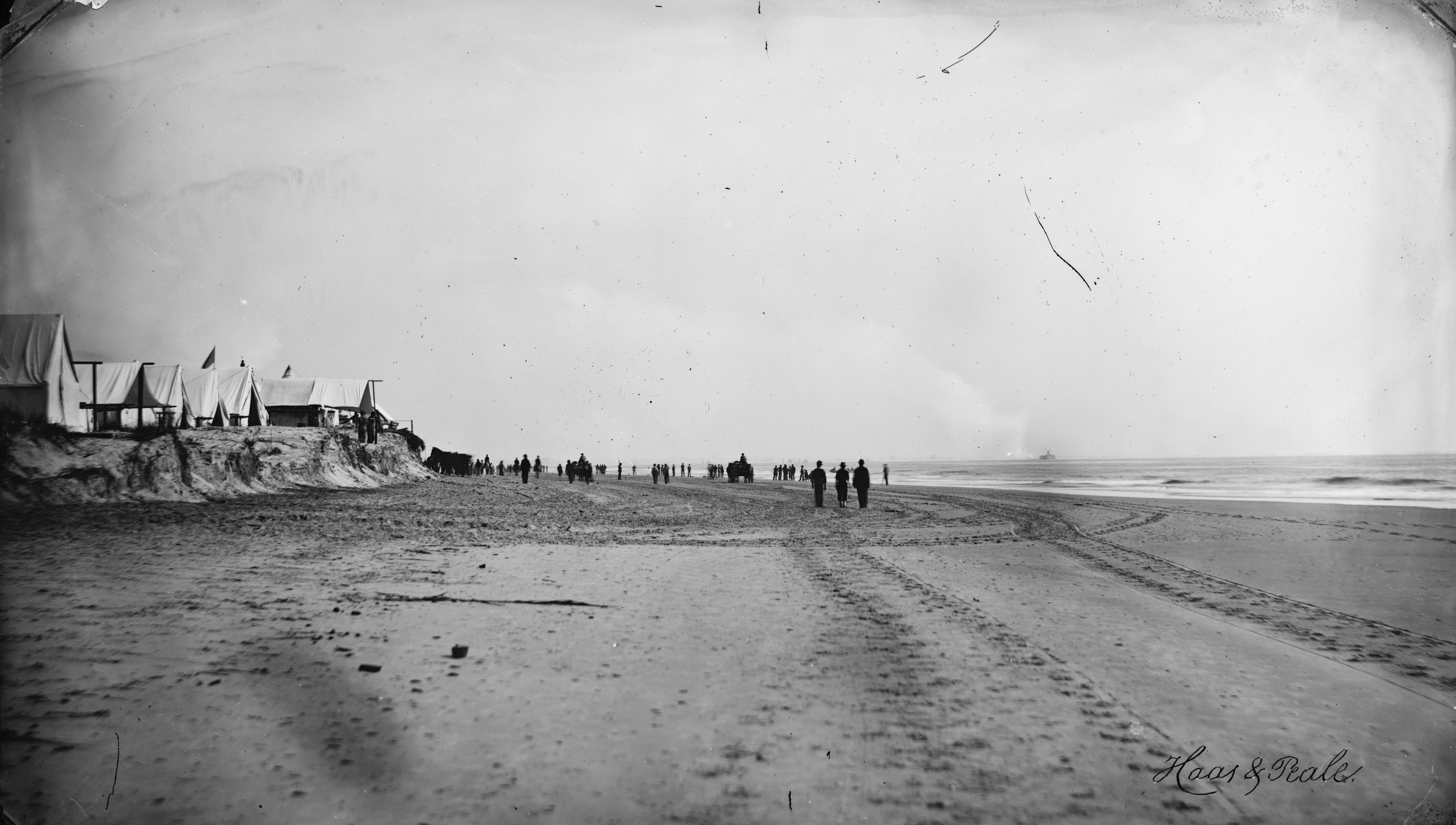
USS New Ironsides and five monitor-class warships engaging Forts Wagner and Gregg in Charleston harbor, S.C., in what is one of the world's first combat action photographs, taken in (September 7 1863.Haas & Peale

George Cook, half stereo of Federal ironclads firing on Fort Moultrie, Sept 8, 1863 (click to enlarge) – The Valentine, Richmond, Va.

During the American Civil War, Mathew Brady and Alexander Gardner began recreating scenes of battle in order to overcome the limitations of early photography with regard to the recording of moving objects. Despite instantaneous photography being commercially available, most photographers took older cameras in the field as they had less delicate components, and so had to forfeit the ability to capture motion. Their reconfigured scenes were designed to intensify the visual and emotional effects of battle.

Gardner and Brady rearranged bodies of dead soldiers during the Civil War in order to create a clear picture of the atrocities associated with battle. In Soldiers on the Battlefield, Brady produced a controversial tableau of the dead within a desolate landscape. This work, along with Alexander Gardner's 1863 work, Home of a Rebel Sharpshooter, were images which, when shown to the public, brought home the horrific reality of war.

Also during the Civil War, George S. Cook captured what is likely and sometimes believed to be the world's first photographs of actual combat, during the Union bombardment of Confederate fortifications near Charleston – his wet-plate photographs taken under fire show explosions and Union ships firing at southern positions September 8, 1863. By coincidence, northern photographers Haas and Peale made a photographic plate of USS New Ironsides in combat September 7, 1863.

The first South American war to be photographed was the Paraguayan War of 1865–1870. In June 1866, the Montevideo firm of Bate y Compañía commissioned Uruguayan photographer Javier López to travel to the field of battle.

López used the wet-plate collodion process, making and developing his plates in a portable darkroom. The plates were sensitive to blue light only; his darkroom was an orange tent. This was the first time photography had covered South American warfare and his images became iconic. The firm did send a photographer to cover the Siege of Paysandú the year before, but he arrived after the fighting was over. He captured images of the ruined town and corpses in a street.

The Second Anglo-Afghan War of 1878–1880 was photographed by John Burke who traveled with the British forces. This was a commercial venture with the hope of selling albums of war photographs.

British war photographer Francis Gregson was attached to the Anglo-Egyptian troops under the command of Herbert Kitchener during the reconquest of the Sudan. Gregson is believed to have been the author of an album of 232 photographs called "Khartoum 1898", taken during the Anglo-Egyptian military campaign in Sudan from 1896 – 98. Documenting the advance of British troops and their victory over the Mahdist forces, he published not only numerous pictures of the Anglo-Egyptian troops and their officers, but also photographs of Anglo-Egyptian troops looting dead enemies and defeated Sudanese, like the commander at the Battle of Atbara, Emir Mahmoud.

=== 20th century ===
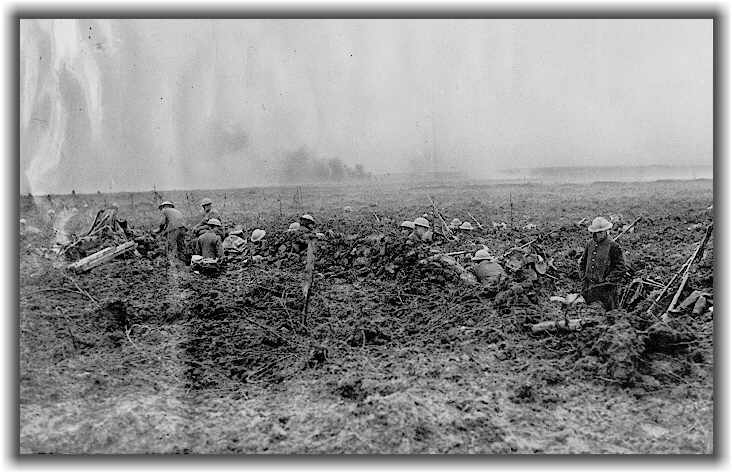
Battle of Vimy Ridge, 1917, by Jack Turner

World War I was one of the first conflicts during which cameras were small enough to be carried on one's person. Canadian soldier Jack Turner secretly and illegally brought a camera to the battlefront and made photographs.

The Terror of War, 1972, by Nick Ut

In the 20th century, professional photographers covered all the major conflicts, and many were killed as a consequence, among which was Robert Capa, who covered the Spanish Civil War, the Second Sino-Japanese War, the D-Day landings and the fall of Paris, and conflicts in the 1950s until his death by a landmine in Indochina in May 1954. Photojournalist Dickey Chapelle was killed by a landmine in Vietnam, in November 1965. The Raising the Flag on Iwo Jima in 1945 was taken by photojournalist Joe Rosenthal.

Unlike paintings, which presented a single illustration of a specific event, photography offered the opportunity for an extensive amount of imagery to enter circulation. The proliferation of the photographic images allowed the public to be well informed in the discourses of war. The advent of mass-reproduced images of war were not only used to inform and propagandize the public, but they served as imprints of the time and as historical recordings.

Wartime censorship was widely practiced on all sides during both world wars. All photos had to undergo approval prior to publication, to avoid operational or technical secrets from falling into enemy hands.

Mass-produced images did have consequences. Besides informing the public, the glut of images in distribution over-saturated the market, allowing viewers to develop the ability to disregard the immediate value and historical importance of certain photographs. Despite this, photojournalists continue to cover conflicts around the world.

=== Profession today ===
Journalists and photographers are protected by international conventions of armed warfare, but history shows that they are often considered targets by warring groups — sometimes to show hatred of their opponents and other times to prevent the facts shown in the photographs from being known. War photography has become more dangerous with the advent of terrorism in armed conflict as some terrorists target journalists and photographers. In the Iraq War, 36 photographers and camera operators were abducted or killed during the conflict from 2003 to 2009. Several were killed by US fire: two Iraqi journalists working for Reuters were notably strafed by a helicopter during the July 12, 2007, Baghdad airstrike, yielding a scandal when WikiLeaks published the video of the gun camera. U.S. Army combat photographer Specialist Hilda Clayton was killed when the mortar she was photographing accidentally exploded.

War photographers need not necessarily work near active fighting; instead they may document the aftermath of conflict. The German photographer Frauke Eigen created a photographic exhibition about war crimes in Kosovo which focused on the clothing and belongings of the victims of ethnic cleansing, rather than on their corpses. Eigen's photographs were taken during the exhumation of mass graves, and were later used as evidence by the International Criminal Tribunal for the former Yugoslavia.

== Gallery ==
=== War photographers ===
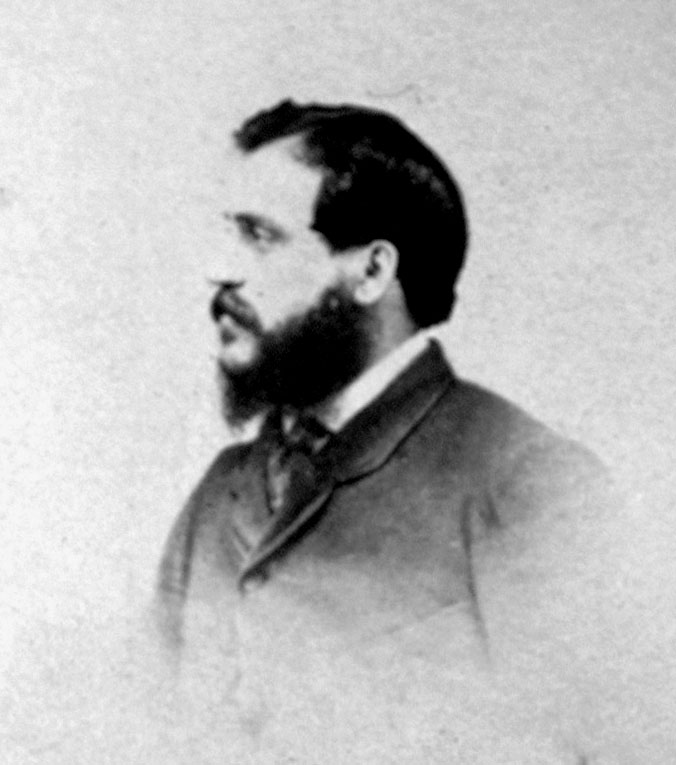
Felice Beato

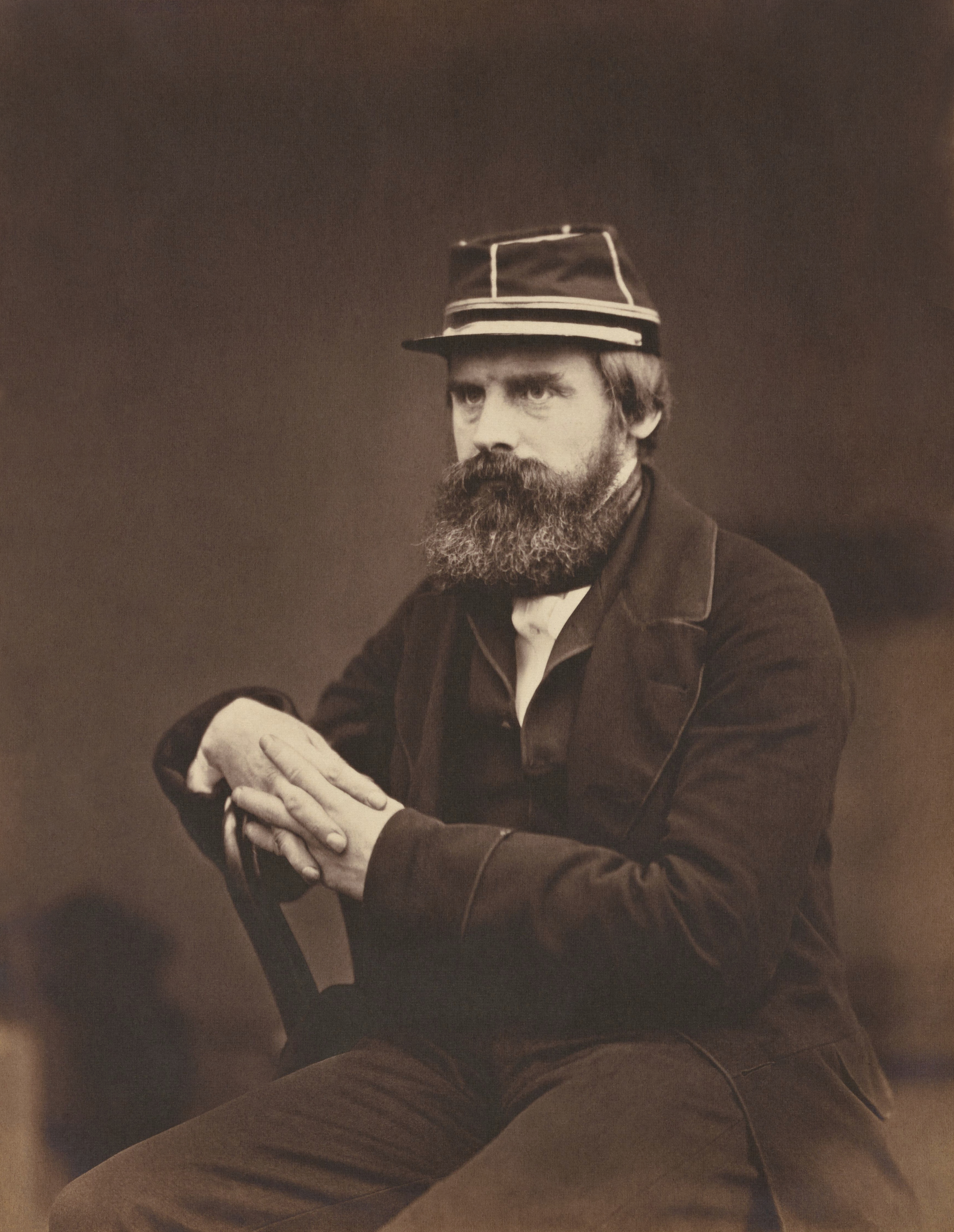
Roger Fenton

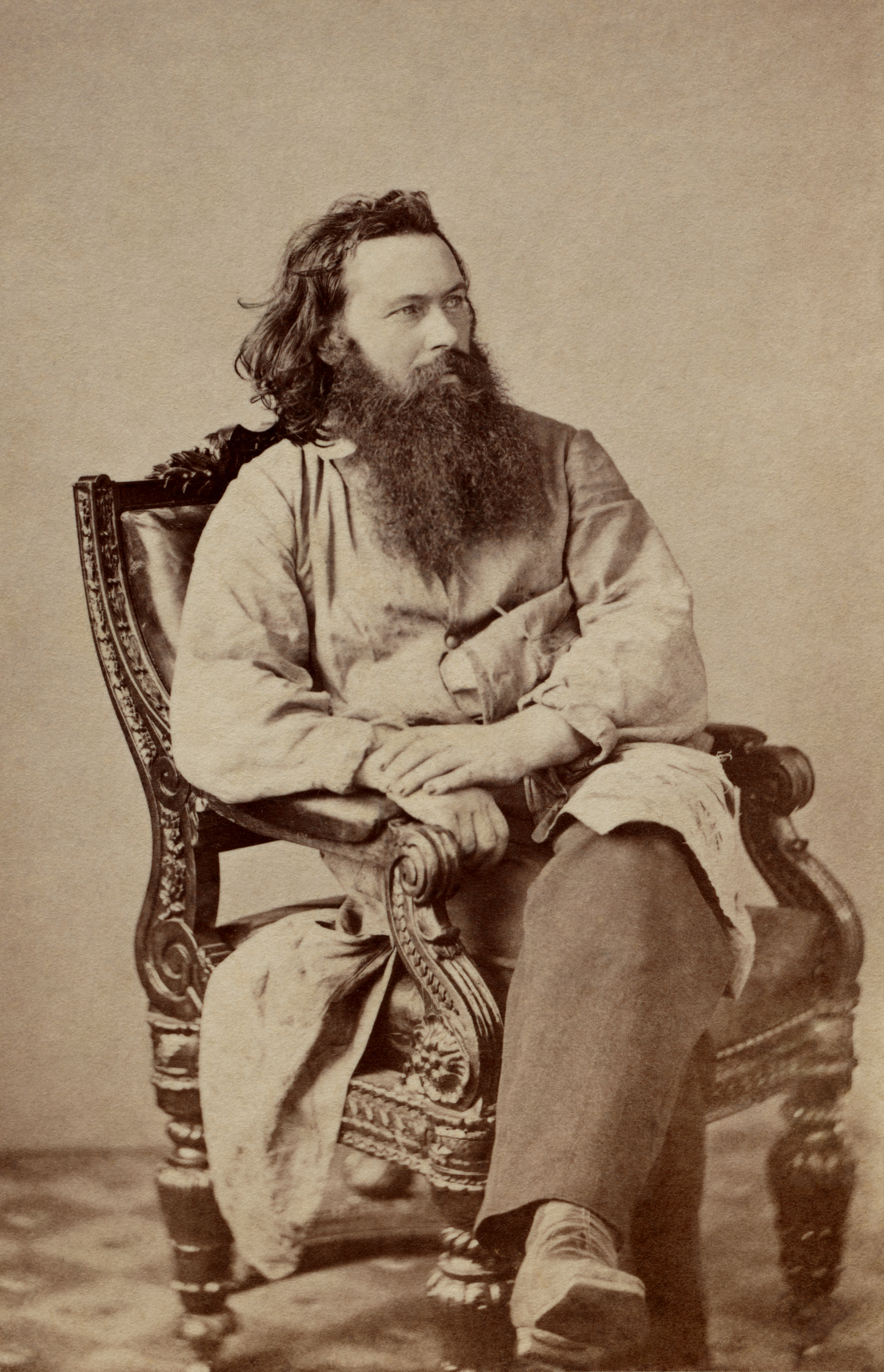
Alexander Gardner

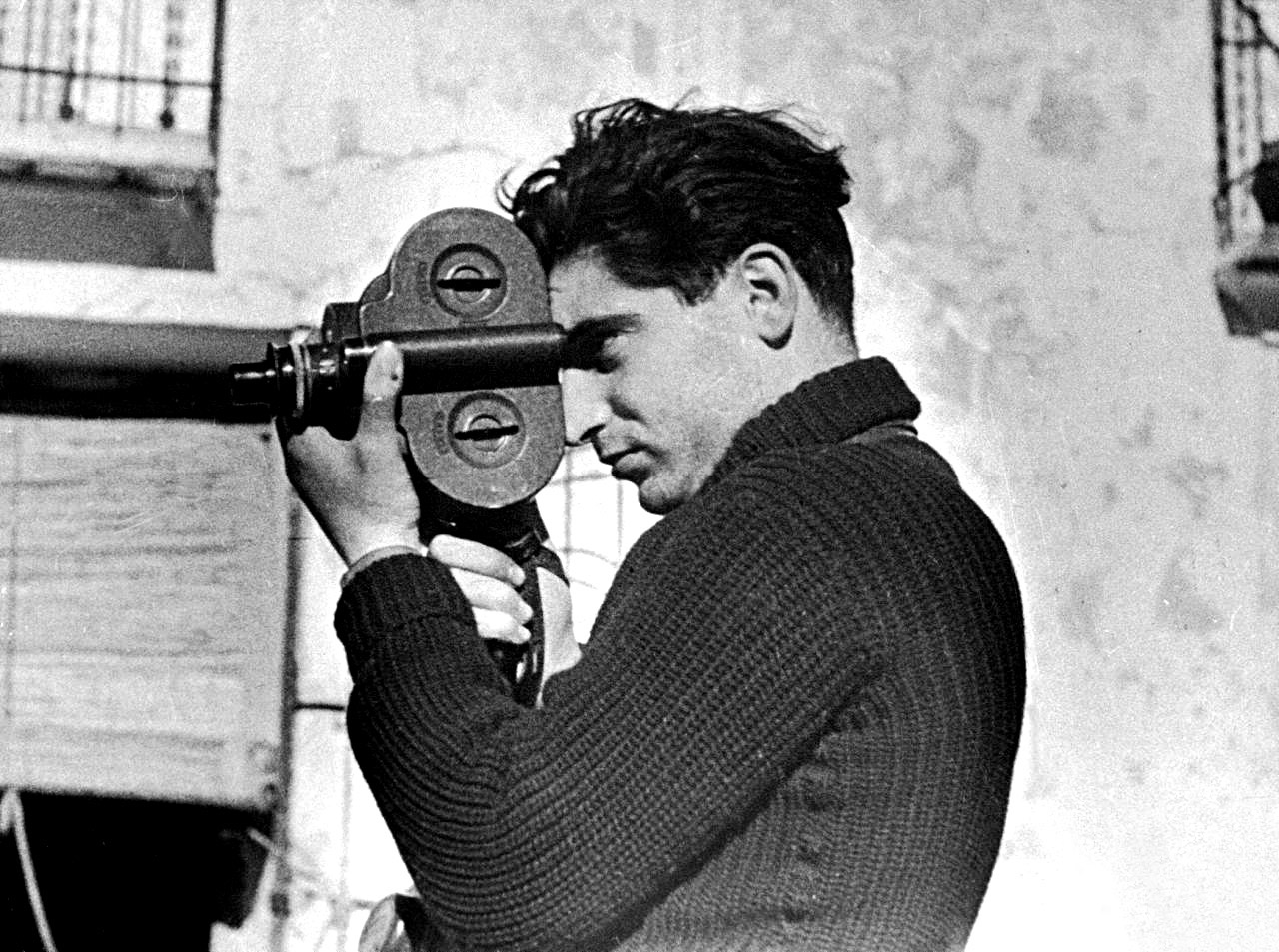
Robert Capa

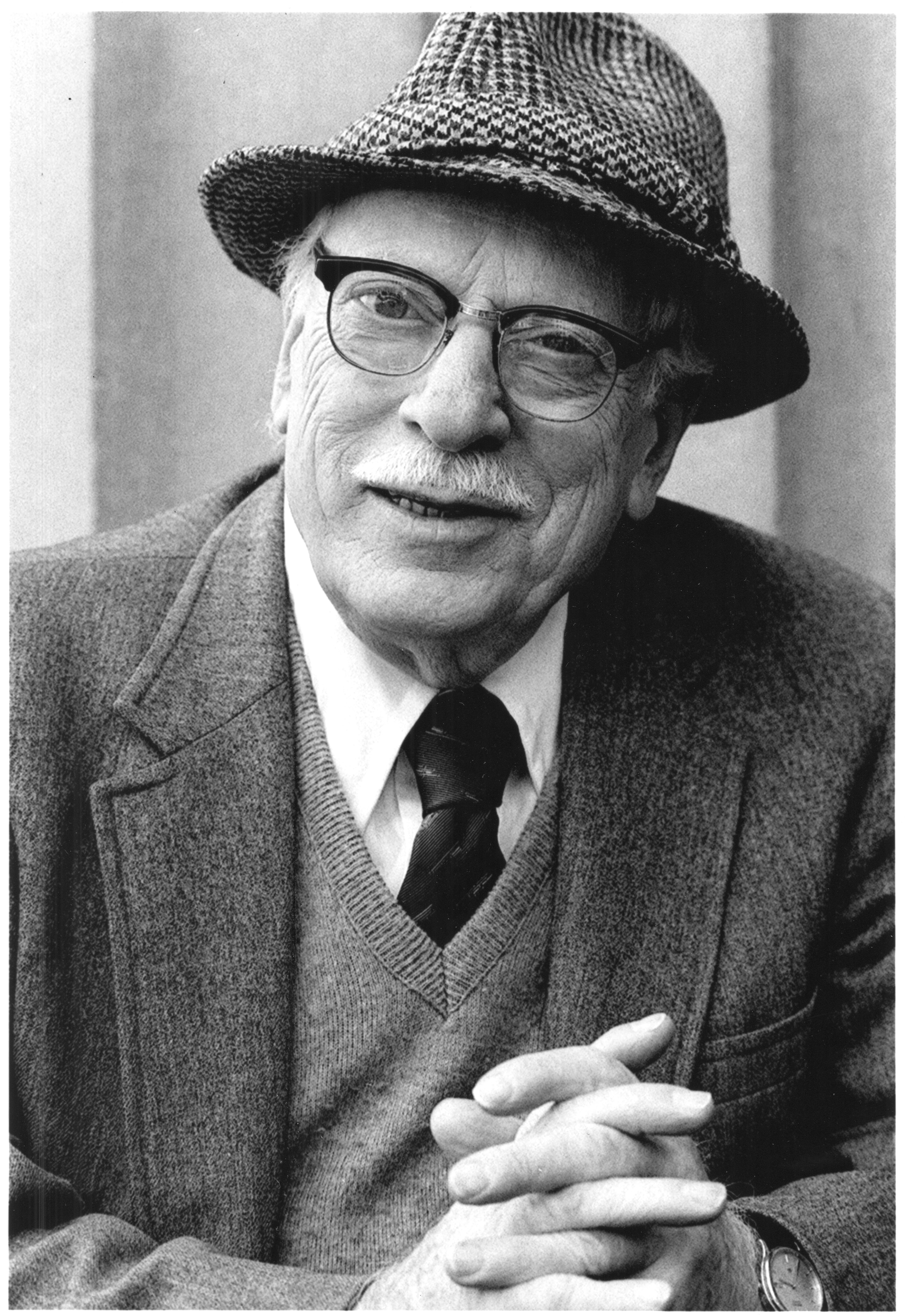
Joe Rosenthal

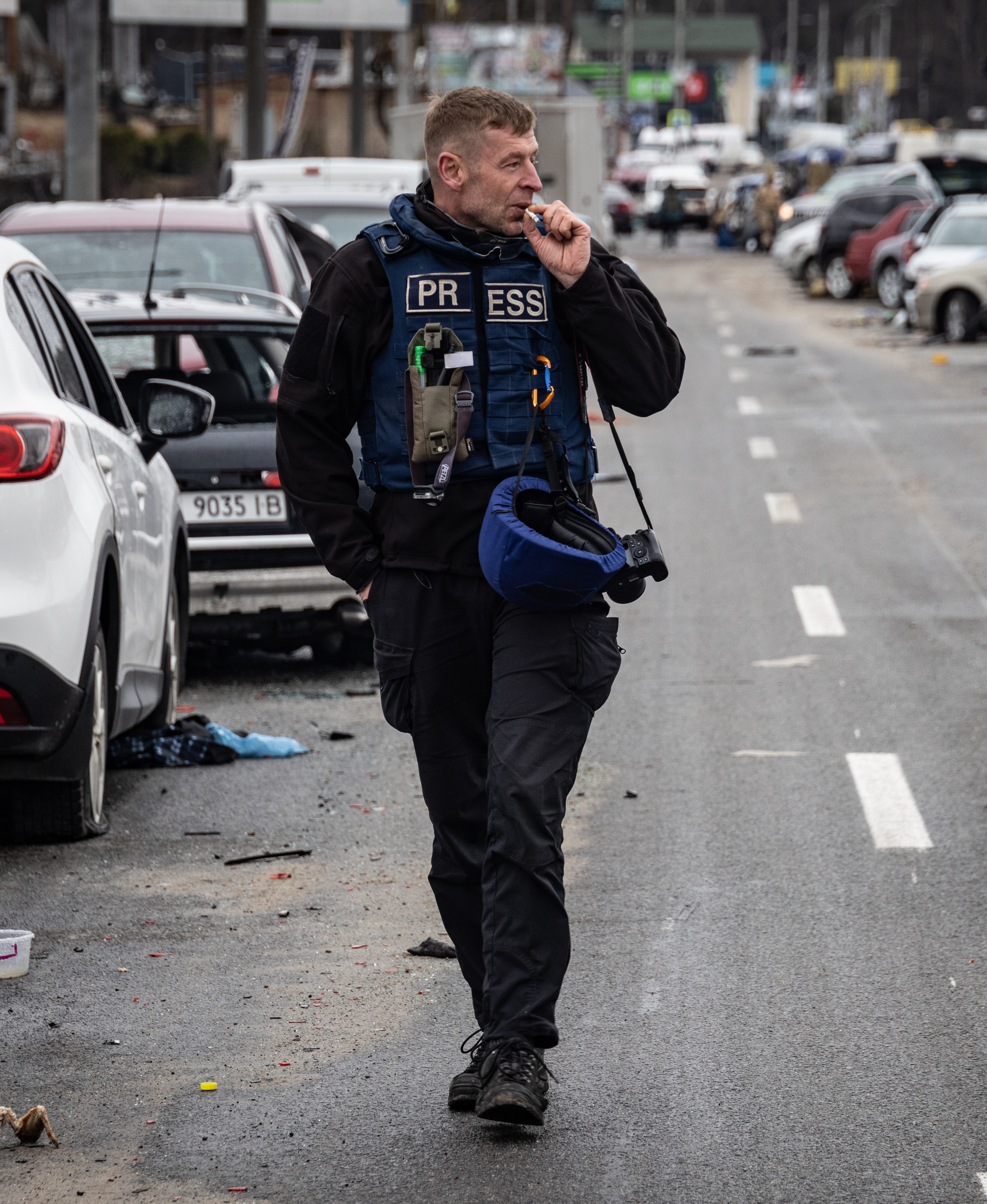
Andrii Dubchak

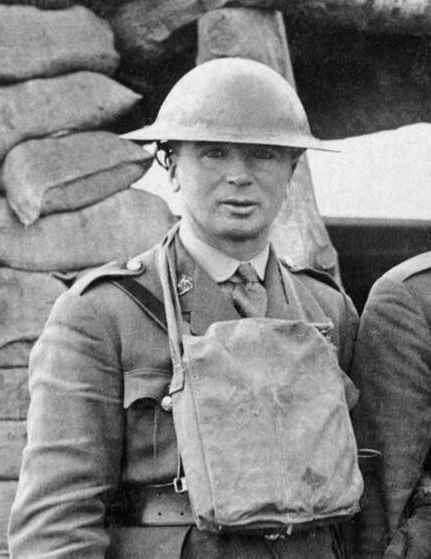
Ernest Brooks

== See also ==
- Embedded journalism
- Photojournalism
- War artist
- War correspondent
